= Wizards of Waverly Place (disambiguation) =

Wizards of Waverly Place is a television series.

Wizards of Waverly Place may also refer to:

- Wizards of Waverly Place (soundtrack)
- Wizards of Waverly Place (video game)
- Wizards of Waverly Place: Spellbound
- Wizards of Waverly Place: The Movie
- List of Wizards of Waverly Place episodes

- Wizards of Waverly Place season 1
- Wizards of Waverly Place season 2
- Wizards of Waverly Place season 3
- Wizards of Waverly Place season 4
