= List of Wizards of Waverly Place episodes =

Logo of the series

The following is a list of episodes for the Disney Channel Original Series Wizards of Waverly Place. The series aired from October 12, 2007, to January 6, 2012. A total of 106 episodes were aired, spanning four seasons, along with an hour-long "return" episode that aired on March 15, 2013.

The series revolves around Alex Russo (Selena Gomez), a teenage wizard who is competing with her siblings Justin (David Henrie) and Max (Jake T. Austin) to become the sole wizard in their family to keep their powers. In 2009, the series won a Primetime Emmy Award for "Outstanding Children's Program".

== Series overview ==
Season	Episodes	Originally released	
Season	Episodes	First released	Last released
1	21	October 12, 2007	August 31, 2008
2	30	September 12, 2008	August 21, 2009
Film		August 28, 2009	
3	28	October 9, 2009	October 15, 2010
4	27	November 12, 2010	January 6, 2012
Special		March 15, 2013	

== Episodes ==
=== Season 1 (2007–08) ===
No. overall	No. in season	Title	Directed by	Written by	Original release date	Prod. code	U.S. viewers (millions)
1	1	"Crazy 10-Minute Sale"	Fred Savage	Todd J. Greenwald	October 12, 2007	102	5.9
2	2	"First Kiss"	Joe Regalbuto	Vince Cheung & Ben Montanio	October 19, 2007	104	4.8
3	3	"I Almost Drowned in a Chocolate Fountain"	Joe Regalbuto	Gigi McCreery & Perry Rein	October 26, 2007	105	3.7
4	4	"New Employee"	Bob Berlinger	Peter Murrieta	November 2, 2007	107	3.0
5	5	"Disenchanted Evening"	Mark Cendrowski	Jack Sanderson	November 9, 2007	114	4.6
6	6	"You Can't Always Get What You Carpet"	Fred Savage	Peter Murrieta	November 10, 2007	101	4.0
7	7	"Alex's Choice"	Bob Berlinger	Matt Goldman	November 16, 2007	109	N/A
8	8	"Curb Your Dragon"	Bob Berlinger	Gigi McCreery & Perry Rein	November 30, 2007	108	N/A
9	9	"Movies"	Mark Cendrowski	Justin Varava	December 14, 2007	113	N/A
10	10	"Pop Me and We Both Go Down"	Bob Berlinger	Vince Cheung & Ben Montanio	January 6, 2008	103	N/A
11	11	"Potion Commotion"	Bob Berlinger	Todd J. Greenwald	February 10, 2008	110	3.4
12	12	"Justin's Little Sister"	Andrew Tsao	Eve Weston	March 9, 2008	117	N/A
13	13	"Wizard School" (Part 1)	Mark Cendrowski	Vince Cheung & Ben Montanio	April 6, 2008	111	3.7
14	14	"Wizard School" (Part 2)	Mark Cendrowski	Gigi McCreery & Perry Rein	April 6, 2008	112	4.6
15	15	"The Supernatural"	Mark Cendrowski	Matt Goldman	May 18, 2008	115	N/A
16	16	"Alex in the Middle"	Bob Berlinger	Matt Goldman	June 15, 2008	106	N/A
17	17	"Report Card"	Andrew Tsao	Gigi McCreery, Perry Rein & Peter Murrieta	June 29, 2008	118	N/A
18	18	"Credit Check"	Fred Savage	Todd J. Greenwald	July 6, 2008	121	3.8
19	19	"Alex's Spring Fling"	Victor Gonzalez	Matt Goldman	July 20, 2008	119	3.7
20	20	"Quinceañera"	Andrew Tsao	Gigi McCreery & Perry Rein	August 10, 2008	116	3.8
21	21	"Art Museum Piece"	Victor Gonzalez	Vince Cheung & Ben Montanio	August 31, 2008	120	3.74

=== Season 2 (2008–09) ===
No. overall	No. in season	Title	Directed by	Written by	Original release date	Prod. code	U.S. viewers (millions)
22	1	"Smarty Pants"	Victor Gonzalez	Todd J. Greenwald	September 12, 2008	201	4.8
23	2	"Beware Wolf"	Victor Gonzalez	Vince Cheung & Ben Montanio	September 21, 2008	202	4.0
24	3	"Graphic Novel"	Mark Cendrowski	Gigi McCreery & Perry Rein	October 5, 2008	203	3.9
25	4	"Racing"	Victor Gonzalez	Justine Bateman	October 12, 2008	204	4.3
26	5	"Alex's Brother, Maximan"	Victor Gonzalez	Matt Goldman	October 19, 2008	205	N/A
27	6	"Saving WizTech Part 1"	Bob Berlinger	Peter Murrieta	October 26, 2008	208	4.5
28	7	"Saving WizTech Part 2"	Bob Berlinger	Vince Cheung & Ben Montanio	October 26, 2008	209	4.9
29	8	"Harper Knows"	Victor Gonzalez	Gigi McCreery & Perry Rein	November 23, 2008	206	4.6
30	9	"Taxi Dance"	Mark Cendrowski	Peter Murrieta	December 7, 2008	207	N/A
31	10	"Baby Cupid"	Bob Berlinger	Vince Cheung & Ben Montanio	December 14, 2008	210	4.1
32	11	"Make It Happen"	Bob Koherr	Justin Varava	January 1, 2009	211	N/A
33	12	"Fairy Tale"	Bob Koherr	Gigi McCreery & Perry Rein	January 25, 2009	213	N/A
34	13	"Fashion Week"	Victor Gonzalez	Todd J. Greenwald	February 15, 2009	215	3.9
35	14	"Helping Hand"	Bob Koherr	Jay Baxter & Shaun Zaken	February 16, 2009	217	4.5
36	15	"Art Teacher"	Victor Gonzalez	Todd J. Greenwald	March 1, 2009	214	4.1
37	16	"Future Harper"	Bob Koherr	Matt Goldman & Peter Murrieta	March 15, 2009	212	4.1
38	17	"Alex Does Good"	Guy Distad	Vince Cheung & Ben Montanio	April 5, 2009	219	2.8
39	18	"Hugh's Not Normous"	Ken Ceizler	Justin Varava	April 12, 2009	216	3.2
40	19	"Don't Rain on Justin's Parade – Earth"	Bob Koherr	Richard Goodman	April 19, 2009	227	3.7
41	20	"Family Game Night"	Bob Koherr	Gigi McCreery & Perry Rein	April 26, 2009	218	N/A
42	21	"Justin's New Girlfriend"	Victor Gonzalez	Richard Goodman	May 2, 2009	221	N/A
43	22	"My Tutor, Tutor"	David DeLuise	Vince Cheung & Ben Montanio	May 29, 2009	226	N/A
44	23	"Paint By Committee"	Bob Koherr	Peter Dirksen	June 26, 2009	229	6.0
45	24	"Wizard for a Day"	Bob Koherr	Justin Varava	July 10, 2009	230	N/A
46	25	"Cast-Away (To Another Show)" (Note: Part 1 of "Wizards on Deck with Hannah Montana")	Victor Gonzalez	Peter Murrieta	July 17, 2009	220	9.3
47	26	"Wizards vs. Vampires on Waverly Place"	Victor Gonzalez	Peter Murrieta	July 24, 2009	223	5.0
48	27	"Wizards vs. Vampires: Tasty Bites"	Mark Cendrowski	Justin Varava	July 31, 2009	224	4.8
49	28	"Wizards vs. Vampires: Dream Date"	Bob Koherr	Gigi McCreery & Perry Rein	August 7, 2009	225	5.0
50	29	"Wizards and Vampires vs. Zombies"	Victor Gonzalez	Gigi McCreery & Perry Rein	August 8, 2009	228	N/A
51	30	"Retest"	Victor Gonzalez	Todd J. Greenwald	August 21, 2009	222	3.9

=== Film (2009) ===
Title	Directed by	Written by	Original U.S. air date	U.S. viewers (millions)
Wizards of Waverly Place: The Movie	Lev L. Spiro	Dan Berendsen	August 28, 2009	13.5

=== Season 3 (2009–10) ===
No. overall	No. in season	Title	Directed by	Written by	Original release date	Prod. code	U.S. viewers (millions)
52	1	"Franken Girl"	Bob Koherr	Peter Murrieta	October 9, 2009	301	4.6
53	2	"Halloween"	Bob Koherr	Todd J. Greenwald	October 16, 2009	302	4.5
54	3	"Monster Hunter"	Bob Koherr	Richard Goodman	October 23, 2009	303	4.3
55	4	"Three Monsters"	Victor Gonzalez	Justin Varava	October 30, 2009	304	4.4
56	5	"Night at the Lazerama"	Victor Gonzalez	Peter Murrieta	November 6, 2009	306	4.7
57	6	"Doll House"	Jean Sagal	Vince Cheung & Ben Montanio	November 20, 2009	305	4.1
58	7	"Marathoner Helper"	Victor Gonzalez	Vince Cheung & Ben Montanio	December 4, 2009	307	4.2
59	8	"Alex Charms a Boy"	Bob Koherr	Peter Murrieta	January 15, 2010	313	3.9
60	9	"Wizards vs. Werewolves"	Victor Gonzalez	Vince Cheung & Ben Montanio and Gigi McCreery & Perry Rein	January 22, 2010	314–315	6.2
61	10	"Positive Alex"	Victor Gonzalez	Gigi McCreery & Perry Rein	February 26, 2010	308	3.6
62	11	"Detention Election"	Bob Koherr	Gigi McCreery & Perry Rein	March 19, 2010	309	3.3
63	12	"Dude Looks Like Shakira"	Victor Gonzalez	Peter Murrieta	April 16, 2010	317	3.5
64	13	"Eat to the Beat"	Guy Distad	Richard Goodman	April 30, 2010	310	3.3
65	14	"Third Wheel"	Robbie Countryman	Justin Varava	April 30, 2010	311	3.6
66	15	"The Good, the Bad, and the Alex"	Victor Gonzalez	Todd J. Greenwald	May 7, 2010	312	3.5
67	16	"Western Show"	Bob Koherr	Justin Varava	May 14, 2010	316	3.5
68	17	"Alex's Logo"	David DeLuise	David Henrie	May 21, 2010	318	3.7
69	18	"Dad's Buggin' Out"	Guy Distad	Todd J. Greenwald	June 4, 2010	319	3.4
70	19	"Max's Secret Girlfriend"	Bob Koherr	Gigi McCreery & Perry Rein	June 11, 2010	321	3.2
71	20	"Alex Russo, Matchmaker?"	David DeLuise	Vince Cheung & Ben Montanio	July 2, 2010	322	3.3
72	21	"Delinquent Justin"	Mary Lou Belli	Justin Varava	July 16, 2010	323	3.6
73	22	"Captain Jim Bob Sherwood"	Jean Sagal	Richard Goodman	July 23, 2010	320	3.6
74	23	"Wizards vs. Finkles"	Victor Gonzalez	Peter Dirksen	July 30, 2010	325	3.7
75	24	"All About You-Niverse"	Bob Koherr	Marcus Alexander Hart	August 20, 2010	326	3.7
76	25	"Uncle Ernesto"	Bob Koherr	Todd J. Greenwald	August 27, 2010	327	3.4
77	26	"Moving On"	Robbie Countryman	Peter Murrieta	September 10, 2010	324	4.5
78	27	"Wizards Unleashed" "Alex Saves Mason" "Puppy Love" (United Kingdom)	Victor Gonzalez	Vince Cheung & Ben Montanio (Part 1); Justin Varava (Part 2)	October 1, 2010	328–329	4.8
79	28	"Wizards Exposed"	Bob Koherr	Richard Goodman	October 15, 2010	330	4.3

=== Season 4 (2010–12) ===
No. overall	No. in season	Title	Directed by	Written by	Original release date	Prod. code	U.S. viewers (millions)
80	1	"Alex Tells the World"	Victor Gonzalez	Gigi McCreery & Perry Rein	November 12, 2010	401	4.1
81	2	"Alex Gives Up"	Victor Gonzalez	Todd J. Greenwald	November 27, 2010	402	N/A
82	3	"Lucky Charmed"	Victor Gonzalez	Justin Varava	December 10, 2010	403	3.0
83	4	"Journey to the Center of Mason"	Robbie Countryman	Peter Dirksen	December 17, 2010	404	N/A
84	5	"Three Maxes and a Little Lady"	Victor Gonzalez	Richard Goodman	January 7, 2011	405	4.0
85	6	"Daddy's Little Girl"	Robbie Countryman	Gigi McCreery & Perry Rein	January 21, 2011	406	3.4
86	7	"Everything's Rosie for Justin"	Victor Gonzalez	Justin Varava	February 4, 2011	407	3.9
87	8	"Dancing with Angels"	Victor Gonzalez	Richard Goodman	February 11, 2011	408	4.5
88	9	"Wizards vs. Angels"	Victor Gonzalez	Vince Cheung & Ben Montanio	February 18, 2011	409–410	5.1
89	10	"Back to Max"	Guy Distad	Todd J. Greenwald	March 11, 2011	411	3.7
90	11	"Zeke Finds Out"	David DeLuise	Peter Dirksen	April 8, 2011	412	3.0
91	12	"Magic Unmasked"	David DeLuise	Justin Varava	May 13, 2011	413	2.7
92	13	"Meet the Werewolves"	Victor Gonzalez	David Henrie	June 17, 2011	415	4.0
93	14	"Beast Tamer"	Victor Gonzalez	Gigi McCreery & Perry Rein	June 24, 2011	416	4.0
94	15	"Wizard of the Year"	Victor Gonzalez	Richard Goodman	July 8, 2011	417	3.6
95	16	"Misfortune at the Beach"	Jody Margolin Hahn	Vince Cheung & Ben Montanio	July 24, 2011	420	3.5
96	17	"Wizards vs. Asteroid"	Victor Gonzalez	Peter Dirksen	August 19, 2011	418	3.6
97	18	"Justin's Back In"	Guy Distad	Todd J. Greenwald	August 26, 2011	419	3.2
98	19	"Alex the Puppetmaster"	Victor Gonzalez	Gigi McCreery & Perry Rein	September 16, 2011	421	3.0
99	20	"My Two Harpers"	Victor Gonzalez	Manny Basanese	September 30, 2011	422	3.03
100	21	"Wizards of Apartment 13B"	Guy Distad	Justin Varava	October 7, 2011	423	3.54
101	22	"Ghost Roommate"	David DeLuise	Richard Goodman	October 14, 2011	424	4.10
102	23	"Get Along, Little Zombie"	Victor Gonzalez	Peter Dirksen	October 21, 2011	425	3.42
103	24	"Wizards vs. Everything"	Victor Gonzalez	Gigi McCreery & Perry Rein	October 28, 2011	426	3.44
104	25	"Rock Around the Clock"	Guy Distad	Robert Boesel	November 4, 2011	414	3.78
105	26	"Harperella"	Victor Gonzalez	Richard Goodman & Justin Varava	November 18, 2011	427	3.47
106	27	"Who Will Be the Family Wizard?"	Victor Gonzalez	Vince Cheung & Ben Montanio (Part 1); Todd J. Greenwald (Part 2)	January 6, 2012	428–429	9.76

=== Special (2013) ===
Title	Directed by	Written by	Original U.S. air date	U.S. viewers (millions)
The Wizards Return: Alex vs. Alex	Victor Gonzalez	Ben Montanio & Vince Cheung and Dan Berendsen	March 15, 2013	5.9

== See also ==
- List of The Suite Life on Deck episodes - includes "Double-Crossed", part two of 'Wizards on Deck with Hannah Montana' crossover
