= Wizards of Waverly Place season 3 =

Wizards of Waverly Place
- Season 3
- Wizards of Waverly Place season three cast
- No. of episodes: 28

Release
- Original network: Disney Channel
- Original release: October 9, 2009 – October 15, 2010

Season chronology
- ← Previous; Season 2 Next → Season 4

The third season of Wizards of Waverly Place aired on Disney Channel from October 9, 2009, to October 15, 2010. The Russo children, Alex (Selena Gomez), Justin (David Henrie), and Max Russo (Jake T. Austin) continue to compete to become the leading wizard in their family and meet many friends and adversaries along the way. Maria Canals Barrera and David DeLuise co-star as their parents and Jennifer Stone co-stars as Alex's best friend, Harper Finkle. This is the first season of the series to be broadcast in high-definition. This is also the final season to play the original version of the series theme song.

== Opening sequence ==
The opening sequence is the same as it was for the previous seasons. The characters in the opening sequence still remain in Standard Definition, only the background being converted to high definition.

The sequence begins with Alex (Selena Gomez) waking up in the morning with her alarm clock buzzing off. She uses a spell to make the time 6:30. She then goes into the bathroom where Justin (David Henrie) is observing himself in the mirror where Alex pushes him to the side. He gets annoyed and then uses magic to put her into the mirror. In the kitchen, Max (Jake T. Austin) has an orange which turns into a vanilla cupcake. Meanwhile, Harper (Jennifer Stone) meets Alex at the front door while pointing at her watermelon shirt. Back at the kitchen, Max is about to put his cupcake into his backpack when his mother, Teresa (Maria Canals Barrera), makes him turn it back into an orange. Alex tells her mother that she is late for school. In the lair, Jerry (David DeLuise) has his spellbook fly away. He then goes to retrieve it. In the sub shop, Alex opens her book bag and the spellbook goes in. Jerry lectures her as the main title card appears. Then the four friends walk to school.

== Synopsis ==
Justin is now a graduated wizard and no longer needs to take wizard training classes with his fellow siblings. Alex now feels the need to step up her training skills with a little help from Harper who now lives with the Russos. Justin also continues his relationship with a vampire named Juliet (Bridgit Claire Mendler) and Alex starts a new one with a werewolf named Mason (Gregg Sulkin). Both relationships end badly, with Juliet being transformed to look her real age and Mason turned permanently into a wolf. However, Justin has moved on with help from Harper and Alex, who has resumed her relationship with Mason after "country magic" restores him to human form. Justin attempts to fulfill a number of achievements he thinks make up a successful senior year at high school, including joining the basketball team, being elected student body president, hosting a big party, and winning the science fair with a water powered engine. Meanwhile, Alex meets a teenage wizard named Stevie Nichols (Hayley Kiyoko), who generals the same personality as Alex. Alex and Stevie become friends, much to Harper's dismay. Then, Stevie begins a wizard revolution and Alex tricks her into joining the revolution to freeze Stevie and transport her powers to her brother, Warren. Max then destroys Stevie by accident. Alex has romance going off and on in this season. Max falls for his first girlfriend. The season finale has the family kidnapped by government agents for being wizards. Tricked into believing an alien invasion is coming, Justin tells the agents magic exists, leading to most wizards being captured. The Russos manage to escape with Alex declaring they need to tell the world the truth to save the wizard world.

Guest stars and recurring cast include: Bill Chott as Mr. Laritate, Dan Benson as Zeke Beakerman, Hayley Kiyoko as Stevie Nichols, Bridgit Claire Mendler as Juliet Van Heusen, Moisés Arias as Conscience, Bella Thorne as Nancy Lukey, Fred Willard as Mr. Stuffleby, Austin Butler as George, Shakira as Herself, Ted McGinley as Magroder, John O'Hurley as Captain Jim Bob Sherwood, Wilmer Valderrama as Uncle Ernesto, Kate Flannery as Elaine Finkle, and Jeff Garlin as Uncle Kelbo.

== Cast ==
- Selena Gomez as Alex Russo
- David Henrie as Justin Russo
- Jake T. Austin as Max Russo
- Jennifer Stone as Harper Finkle
- Maria Canals Barrera as Theresa Russo
- David DeLuise as Jerry Russo

== Episodes ==
Wizards of Waverly Place Season 3 episodes
No. overall	No. in season	Title	Directed by	Written by	Original release date	Prod. code	U.S. viewers (millions)
52	1	"Franken Girl"	Bob Koherr	Peter Murrieta	October 9, 2009	301	4.6
As Justin is continuously getting annoyed by Alex breaking into his room and stealing things, he decides to create a female Frankenstein's monster to act as a 'body guard' and names her "Franken Girl". However, when Alex beats the monster and still manages to break into Justin's room, he tries to get revenge by casting a spell to make Franken Girl Alex's best friend but also casts a "spell lock" to stop Alex from reversing the spell. Although initially annoyed by Franken Girl's obsession with her, Alex soon takes a liking to her, which just makes Justin more mad and more eager to seek revenge. He soon thinks up a rather elaborate (and somewhat demented) revenge plan to make Franken Girl love cheerleading (the sport that Alex hates the most) and she forces Alex to join the squad when she sees a flyer of a "cheerleaders wanted" sign. The episode ends with Franken Girl accidentally launching Alex out of the school when Alex mentions "I'll be late for Algebra." Guest stars: Perry Mattfeld as FrankenGirl, Bill Chott as Mr. Laritate Notes: This is the first episode of the series to be broadcast in high definition, as the show now utilizes a 'filmized' appearance (though it is still shot on videotape, as is standard with Disney Channel sitcoms beginning with Sonny with a Chance). This episode aired on September 27, 2009 on Disney Channel Middle East. It was the first of two times that Frankengirl appeared.
53	2	"Halloween"	Bob Koherr	Todd J. Greenwald	October 16, 2009	302	4.5
The Russos' haunted house has been lame every year, mostly because Justin insists that they focus on safety and making the right decisions to avoid being "haunted" by them later in life. The person in charge of the haunted house, Mr. Evans, threatens to take the Russos' contribution away if it is not scarier this Halloween. Alex then goes to the wizard world and gets three real (but only mildly scary) ghosts, following her father's orders. However, they aren't scary enough, as at first, Teresa thinks they're just people in masks. Alex and Harper go back to the wizard world and get "Mantooth", the scariest ghost from the wizard world who used to scare Justin at night. Mantooth does something with his face that scares the children so badly that they flee the house. Mr. Evans immediately declares that their haunted house is too scary and takes it away anyway. Guest stars: Bo Foxworth as Coach, Scott Freeburg as Doug, Daniel Roebuck as Mr. Evans, Sean Whalen as Mantooth, Hilary Hacker as Miss Chenowith, Stephen A.F. Day as Frank, Shannon McClung as Doug's Body, Keith Allan as Wally
54	3	"Monster Hunter"	Bob Koherr	Richard Goodman	October 23, 2009	303	4.3
Justin signs up for Monster Hunting after he masters his 5,000th spell. Knowing that Justin could become the family wizard, Alex studies with help from Harper. Meanwhile, Max performs a spell that separates his conscience from himself. Then, he performs another spell to make monsters go all over the city to sabotage Justin's training even though his conscience tells him not to. Later, Alex, Max and his conscience go to help Justin with the monsters and Alex performs two spells successfully and saves Justin. Special guest stars: Fred Willard as Mr. Stuffleby, Moisés Arias as Conscience
55	4	"Three Monsters"	Victor Gonzalez	Justin Varava	October 30, 2009	304	4.4
Justin begins his Monster Hunting course and senses that there are three unregistered monsters on Waverly Place. Forgetting that Juliet and her family live there, he tells the professionals, and they come looking for her. Realizing his mistake, Justin tries to fix it by trying to find three other monsters. In the end, the monster hunters take away Franken Girl and Justin's robot. Meanwhile, Max tries to separate himself from his conscience because he thinks that he is trying to steal his mother. Special guest star: Moisés Arias as Conscience Guest stars: Bridgit Claire Mendler as Juliet Van Heusen, Andy Kindler as Chancellor Tootietootie, Wendi McLendon-Covey as Dr. Ice, Pat Finn as Luxor Absent: David DeLuise as Jerry Russo
56	5	"Night at the Lazerama"	Victor Gonzalez	Peter Murrieta	November 6, 2009	306	4.7
For his first official monster hunting assignment, Justin is dispatched to capture a mind controlling mummy after all of the other monster hunters are apparently killed in action. Arriving at the museum, Justin and Juliet end up getting trapped in an exhibit with a soundproof plastic window, leaving them unable to call for help and the window itself immune to Justin's magic. Justin believes that they can wait until morning for a worker to let them out, but quickly realizes otherwise when he remembers that exposure to sunlight will incinerate Juliet. Justin ultimately decides that Juliet needs to look in the mummy's eyes and become his slave in order to leave so she will not be destroyed, though he promises to hunt down the mummy and save Juliet one day. Meanwhile, Alex, in an attempt to sabotage Max's increasingly good behavior and gain a better chance at winning the wizard competition, has Harper separate Conscience from Max, and Max's behavior becomes increasingly horrific; however, she quickly rushes to fix the problem when Jerry informs her that Conscience will become his own person if he is separated from Max for too long. After reuniting Max and his conscience, Alex discovers Justin's plight and rushes to save him, but arrives too late to save Juliet from the mummy. Special guest star: Moisés Arias as Conscience Guest stars: Bridgit Claire Mendler as Juliet Van Heusen, Andy Kindler as Chancellor Tootietootie, John Eric Bentley as Mummy, Adam Irigoyen as New Conscience
57	6	"Doll House"	Jean Sagal	Vince Cheung & Ben Montanio	November 20, 2009	305	4.1
After Harper finds out that her parents are moving to Pittsburgh, the Russos offer to clear out their basement so she can live with them and stay in New York. While Alex and Harper clean out the basement to make room for Harper's things, they find Alex's old doll house. Alex shrinks herself down to fit in the doll house to use as her own art studio, but Jerry and Theresa give the doll house away to a little girl named Olive, with Alex still in it. Unable to use magic to get out, as she had dropped her wand, Alex gets Harper's attention and begs her not to tell Justin. However, Harper tells him and then the pair help Alex, when she makes him buy the doll house back. Meanwhile, Justin tries to sell his "Captain Jim-Bob Sherwood Farmhouse Space Command Module" which is worth $300. Guest stars: Yara Shahidi as Olive, Gregg Binkley as Randy
58	7	"Marathoner Helper"	Victor Gonzalez	Vince Cheung & Ben Montanio	December 4, 2009	307	4.2
After Harper wins a marathon, she discovers that Alex used magic to help her win every competition since they were very young, including the marathon. Upset that she never really won anything on her own, Alex decides to let Harper do all the contests again from the past in order to have the opportunity to win without the aid of magic, though things go wrong when Harper proves to be completely incompetent in everything. Meanwhile, Justin decides to enter the marathon so he can be the first Russo to win an athletic trophy. Guest star: Dan Benson as Zeke
59	8	"Alex Charms a Boy"	Bob Koherr	Peter Murrieta	January 15, 2010	313	3.9
Alex meets and falls for Mason, a transfer student from England. After they start dating, she finds him perfect in every way, except for his view of art, which is dogs and parts of American history. Alex tries to make him more American, by throwing water balloons at people (being rude) and laughing in appreciation (making fun of Mr. Laritate and Harper's clothes). In order to make him a better artist, Alex takes matters into her own hands by putting a spell on Mason to make her his new artistic inspiration, which ends up on Mason kissing Alex in the rain. Meanwhile, Justin trains for finding the mummy that took away Juliet, so Jerry gives Justin goggles where you can see behind you so Justin wouldn't have to look into the mummy's eyes and get turned to his minion. During this, it is discovered that, when Max cast the spell that set monsters running loose in an idiotic attempt to sabotage Justin's monster hunting, one of the escaped monsters is said mummy, thus making Max himself indirectly responsible for both Juliet's kidnapping and the deaths of all of the other monster hunters. Guest stars: Bill Chott as Mr. Laritate, Gregg Sulkin as Mason Absent: Maria Canals Barrera as Theresa Russo
60	9	"Wizards vs. Werewolves"	Victor Gonzalez	Vince Cheung & Ben Montanio and Gigi McCreery & Perry Rein	January 22, 2010	314–315	6.2
In this episode, Justin and Max continue to search for Juliet. Meanwhile, Mason and Alex continue dating and Mason gives her a glowing necklace. However, Mason keeps running away from Alex before the evening. She becomes suspicious and follows him one night. Alex and Harper discover that Mason is actually a werewolf. She confesses that she is a wizard and they continue to date. Mason then reveals that the necklace only glows when someone is in love with the person who put it on the other person. When Justin and Max find out that Mason is a werewolf, Justin thinks that Mason can help track down Juliet. He tracks her scent to Transylvania, where the mummy has been holding Juliet prisoner and expecting Justin, though they destroy the mummy after a brief face-off. The Russo's happiness at saving Juliet is cut short when it is discovered that Juliet and Mason dated one another three centuries ago, and the situation worsens when Mason impulsively blurts out that he still loves her. Alex throws away the True Love Necklace and breaks up with Mason. Juliet then says that she used to love Mason, but her soulmate is Justin. Alex is heartbroken the next day, and Mason goes to the substation to talk to Alex, but she won't let him explain, and Harper decides to set up an "Alex-watch" to keep the two separate. Later, Mason meets Max, who manages to take him to Alex. Mason is able to persuade Alex to go back to Transylvania with him to search for the True Love Necklace, so that Mason can prove his feelings for her. Justin, Max, and Juliet follow them. At odds with Justin, Mason transforms into a full Werewolf and starts to attack Justin, which results in being attacked by Juliet. During the fight, Juliet bites Mason and is scratched by him in turn: as a result, Juliet loses her vampire powers and quickly ages into a white-haired, wrinkly old lady, and Mason transforms into an actual wolf. Before this happens, however, Alex successfully locates the necklace and puts it on Mason, which proves that he does indeed love her. Realizing that they can no longer be together, Juliet and Mason reluctantly break up with Justin and Alex. They then depart, leaving both Russos completely heartbroken. Guest stars: Bridgit Claire Mendler as Juliet Van Heusen, Gregg Sulkin as Mason, John Eric Bentley as Mummy
61	10	"Positive Alex"	Victor Gonzalez	Gigi McCreery & Perry Rein	February 26, 2010	308	3.6
Alex has a crush on George, the school's bandleader, but is unable to get his attention because he is turned off by her sour attitude and unenergetic cheers at the school basketball games. Determined to get George to ask her to the school dance, she casts a spell on herself to become a positive person. Unfortunately, the spell backfires when, during the next game, Alex's newfound optimism turns out to be too much when she starts cheering for the opposing team, ultimately leading Tribeca Prep to squander a huge lead and lose the game. Meanwhile, Justin has joined the basketball team and is trying to get a big senior moment captured on video. During the game, Justin gets to play and scores 3 three pointers. However, Max, tasked with capturing the game on videotape, is too fascinated with the camera, conducting somewhat embarrassing zoom-in shots of Theresa and Jerry, and forgets all about the action on the court. Guest stars: Dan Benson as Zeke, Bill Chott as Mr. Laritate, Austin Butler as George
62	11	"Detention Election"	Bob Koherr	Gigi McCreery & Perry Rein	March 19, 2010	309	3.3
Justin and Zeke are running against each other to become Student Body President. Justin soon finds his efforts put in jeopardy after someone wallpaper's Principal Laritate's office with posters of his campaign and he is accused of masterminding the prank. In Saturday detention, Alex befriends a rebellious new girl at school named Stevie. On their trip to Coney Island, Jerry, Max and Harper are stuck on a Ferris wheel and Max drops his wand in an attempt to get them off. Harper is flashed off the Ferris wheel by Alex, and they both try to help Justin out of trouble. Meanwhile, Justin has gained newfound popularity by taking credit for the prank and also to get more votes for his campaign. But his friendship with Zeke may be strained when he chooses his popularity over his best friend. In the end, Justin wins the race but he is disqualified because of the prank. Alex takes the blame so Justin can become president but Stevie confesses that she pulled off the prank. Justin becomes Student Body President by six votes, but Zeke withdrew his vote when he found out that Justin did not vote. However, Justin gained his friendship with Zeke back and lost his popularity. Harper is sent back on the Ferris wheel by Alex, who was banned and wanted revenge because Jerry, Max and Harper went without her, where Jerry and Max are still stuck on, but luckily she grabbed her jacket made of spicy and teriyaki jerky. Guest stars: Dan Benson as Zeke, Bill Chott as Mr. Laritate, Hayley Kiyoko as Stevie, Grant Alan as Eddie Absent: Maria Canals Barrera as Theresa Russo
63	12	"Dude Looks Like Shakira"	Victor Gonzalez	Peter Murrieta	April 16, 2010	317	3.5
When Theresa and Jerry go on vacation and leave Uncle Kelbo to watch the kids. When Uncle Kelbo comes he is not him, he is Shakira. He confess to them that there is no Shakira and that he made her up years ago. Uncle Kelbo tells them that there is a strict law against using magic for fame and fortune, Max and Alex try to find a cure so that Uncle Kelbo can stay his real self. Max finds a spell and has the same problem as Uncle Kelbo, except he turns into a garbage can. Special guest star: Shakira as herself Guest stars: Jeff Garlin as Uncle Kelbo, Michael Monken as MacGruder Absent: Jennifer Stone as Harper Finkle
64	13	"Eat to the Beat"	Guy Distad	Richard Goodman	April 30, 2010	310	3.3
After Harper's lunchtime Shakespeare impressions are a total bust, Alex and Stevie ask Justin to hire a rock band to play at lunchtime. Justin agrees, feeling that he owes Stevie since she got him elected to become Student Body President. However, Justin hires a smooth jazz band instead of a rock band, which angers Alex. Harper later finds out that Stevie is a wizard, but instantly forgets it after Stevie uses a spell to erase Harper's short-term memory. Guest stars: Hayley Kiyoko as Stevie, Aaron Hendry as Grrrtarist, Beau Billingslea as Burt Parks Absent: Jake T. Austin as Max Russo, Maria Canals Barrera as Theresa Russo, David DeLuise as Jerry Russo
65	14	"Third Wheel"	Robbie Countryman	Justin Varava	April 30, 2010	311	3.6
Harper tells Alex that Stevie is a wizard after Harper sees Stevie use a wand, with Stevie erasing her memory, which Alex helps Harper regain. Alex then confronts Stevie about her secret and the two bond even more because of their magical abilities making Harper feel left out. Meanwhile, Justin and Zeke come with the idea to build a float for the school's homecoming festivities. Guest stars: Dan Benson as Zeke, Bill Chott as Mr. Laritate, Hayley Kiyoko as Stevie Absent: Jake T. Austin as Max Russo, Maria Canals Barrera as Theresa Russo
66	15	"The Good, the Bad, and the Alex"	Victor Gonzalez	Todd J. Greenwald	May 7, 2010	312	3.5
Alex is caught off guard when she discovers that Stevie is leading a wizard revolution. To the dismay of Justin and Harper, she decides to help Stevie with her quest to make sure no wizard ever has to give up their powers again. Alex agrees to Stevie shortly after Stevie barricades the wizard portal with a broom stick. Alex and Stevie also ask Max to join in their revolution, to which Max agrees. Max also declares himself as king, so the two girls have to obey his commands. Justin, knowing his sisters antics, orders a Chinese meal that comes with magic fortune cookies that possess the ability to give a glimpse into the future, thus allowing Justin to find out what Alex will end up doing. Alex is seen telling Harper that after it was all over, they would still be friends. Justin tries to stop her, thinking that she would go through with Stevie's plan, but Alex ends up tricking Stevie, using her wand to turn Stevie into a rock-type substance, freezing her body, and transporting all of Stevie's magical powers to her brother. Shortly after this sequence, Max curiously pokes Stevie's frozen body, accidentally tipping her over. Upon impact with the floor, Stevie's frozen body breaks into hundreds of pieces. To Alex it does not matter, because she still has her only true friend Harper, who was, is, and will always be there for Alex until the very end. Guest stars: Hayley Kiyoko as Stevie, Richard Chiu as Warren, Ezra Weisz as Clown Absent: Maria Canals Barrera as Theresa Russo
67	16	"Western Show"	Bob Koherr	Justin Varava	May 14, 2010	316	3.5
After Superintendent Clanton fires Mr. Laritate (because of Alex's Rollerskate and Pie Day and Max's carelessness) and takes over his school responsibilities and tortures Alex, Justin and Max, They go to Mr. Laritate where he already has a western themed job. So Alex uses a spell that takes Mr. Laritate back in time to the Old West to convince him to fight for his job. After Mr. Laritate learned a lesson back in the western days, he goes back to the school and asks Clanton to give his job as a principal again. Guest stars: Ted McGinley as Superintendent Clanton, Bill Chott as Mr. Laritate Absent: Jennifer Stone as Harper Finkle
68	17	"Alex's Logo"	David DeLuise	David Henrie	May 21, 2010	318	3.7
When Alex's newly designed T-shirts become wildly popular at school, Justin demands that she turn over a fee to the Student Council for selling them on school property. With her generous donation, Alex becomes the winner of the Citizenship award and when Justin puts the truth spell on her to find if she used magic to get the award, he purposefully leaves it on causing her to tell the truth about everyone during her award ceremony speech and then causing everyone to hate her. Meanwhile, Theresa and Jerry are missing Harper while she is visiting her parents. Guest star: Bill Chott as Mr. Laritate Absent: Jennifer Stone as Harper Finkle
69	18	"Dad's Buggin' Out"	Guy Distad	Todd J. Greenwald	June 4, 2010	319	3.4
Justin and Zeke are preparing for the Alien Language League banquet which will be hosted at the Sub Station. Alex carelessly leaves the portal to the Wizard World open, and a pocket elf and fairy escape as well as a Wizard bug, which bites Jerry, and he transforms into a huge insect. He interferes with the Alien Language League Banquet and Justin's hopes of getting a Lifetime Achievement Award by scaring away Joey the Crepe kid and eating all the homemade crepes Theresa was forced to make after Joey ran away, but things take a turn for the better when Alex helps Justin by presenting Jerry in his bug form, as an alien from another planet, knowing how important getting the award is to Justin. In the end Justin is given the Lifetime Achievement Award trophy after all, but Jerry, who is still a giant insect, accidentally melts it. Guest stars: Dan Benson as Zeke, Michael Monken as MacGruder, Paulie Litt as Joey the Crepe Kid, Rachel Cannon as Flutter, Al Madrigal as Pocket Elf
70	19	"Max's Secret Girlfriend"	Bob Koherr	Gigi McCreery & Perry Rein	June 11, 2010	321	3.2
Alex and Harper find out that Max has a girlfriend named Nancy, but has been keeping it a secret so not to be embarrassed by his family. Later Theresa finds out about it and admonishes him for lying. Since he took his mother's advice, he tells Nancy his secret about being a wizard. The Russos then make up another lie to cover the truth, and Nancy breaks up with him because Max keeps on lying to get her to like him. Guest star: Bella Thorne as Nancy
71	20	"Alex Russo, Matchmaker?"	David DeLuise	Vince Cheung & Ben Montanio	July 2, 2010	322	3.3
Alex sets Harper up with Justin's best friend Zeke for the school science fair. But Alex becomes frustrated when she sees that Harper and Zeke are actually interested in their science project than sharing romantic feelings for each other. She then casts a spell to make sparks fly between them, which literally happens when they touch. Meanwhile, Justin creates a water-powered engine, while Max "creates life" by finding items under his bed and putting in a barbecue grill. Guest stars: Dan Benson as Zeke, Ezra Weisz as John, Darrin Butters as Jon
72	21	"Delinquent Justin"	Mary Lou Belli	Justin Varava	July 16, 2010	323	3.6
When Justin is about to graduate high school, Alex tells him that she made a duplicate Justin and put him through four years of college. Justin is revolted, however, to discover that the college version of himself has become a free-spirited hippie who does not care about studying or about life. Soon Alex recombines the two Justins, but the duplicate Justin takes over the mind of the regular Justin, leaving Alex to fix the problem. Meanwhile, Jerry and Theresa try to be better parents. Guest stars: Dan Benson as Zeke, Bill Chott as Mr. Laritate Absent: Jake T. Austin as Max Russo
73	22	"Captain Jim Bob Sherwood"	Jean Sagal	Richard Goodman	July 23, 2010	320	3.6
Alex and Justin are chosen to create an issue of the Captain Jim Bob Sherwood comic book, with Justin writing the story and Alex doing the illustrations. But when they can't agree on their ideas, Alex uses magic and displaces Captain Jim Bob from the comic book, leaving him loose out in the city. Guest star: John O'Hurley as Captain Jim Bob Sherwood
74	23	"Wizards vs. Finkles"	Victor Gonzalez	Peter Dirksen	July 30, 2010	325	3.7
Harper's parents comes to town to audition for a gig as a train vaudeville act in Romania. Harper is completely embarrassed by them, while Alex is won over by them and agrees to join their act, while Harper gets to be in the annual Russo family photo, as both Alex and Harper take on roles in each other's families that they refused to fill themselves—Alex had objected to being in the family photo, and Harper had objected to joining the vaudeville act. However, Alex learns that being in the act is not all fun and games and soon wants out. Guest stars: Dan Benson as Zeke, Kate Flannery as Elaine Finkle, Scot Robinson as Marty Finkle Absent: Maria Canals Barrera as Theresa Russo
75	24	"All About You-Niverse"	Bob Koherr	Marcus Alexander Hart	August 20, 2010	326	3.7
After Alex is punished for one of her schemes in order to go on the class trip to Europe, she defiantly steps into a magical mirror and her world instantly becomes all about her. Alex enjoys how everyone listens to her, but when her mother tries to call her back, mirror-Harper breaks the mirror and could possibly be trapped in that world forever. Justin and Zeke hold an e-waste drive for old electronics in order to save themselves for the "Robot Revolution". Guest star: Dan Benson as Zeke Absent: Jake T. Austin as Max Russo, David DeLuise as Jerry Russo
76	25	"Uncle Ernesto"	Bob Koherr	Todd J. Greenwald	August 27, 2010	327	3.4
Justin, Alex and Max promise a magic-free night for their mother's birthday. When they invite their Uncle Ernesto over, they must stow away magical gifts from Uncle Kelbo. After opening the presents, chaos breaks out as the kids try to hide magic from their mother and uncle. In the end of the episode, Alex proves that she loves her mother more than magic by discarding the egg of a FuChicken (see "Magical objects" section below) which would have told who would win the wizard competition. Special guest star: Wilmer Valderrama as Uncle Ernesto Guest star: Michael D. Cohen as Swiss Army Elf
77	26	"Moving On"	Robbie Countryman	Peter Murrieta	September 10, 2010	324	4.5
When Justin fails to get over Juliet, Alex transforms Harper into a young version of Juliet. Justin is delighted to see her again, until Harper, as Juliet, tries to make him move on. She does convince him to move on after revealing herself. The episode ends with Justin on a date with his new girlfriend and the real Juliet watching him from afar, with a smile on her face. Special guest star: Bridgit Claire Mendler as Juliet Van Heusen Guest star: Laura Samuels as Sara
78	27	"Wizards Unleashed" "Alex Saves Mason" "Puppy Love" (United Kingdom)	Victor Gonzalez	Vince Cheung & Ben Montanio (Part 1); Justin Varava (Part 2)	October 1, 2010	328–329	4.8
After Alex sees on the news a feature about a painting wolf in the Pocono Mountains, she automatically believes that it is Mason. Justin, Max, and Alex flash to the location of the wolf, and learn that it is indeed Mason. However, they then learn that Mason is being held against his will by a family of hillbilly wizards who will agree to give Mason back to Alex in exchange for the Russos' wizard world portal. Alex agrees to make the exchange, unbeknownst to her brothers. The hillbilly family arrive at the Russos' lair for the exchange but Alex fools them by concealing their portal with an anti-magic realm. Because of that, Mason, who had transformed to his human form, reverts to a wolf as a form of revenge from the hillbillies. The Russos figure out about the transforming hillbilly music and use it on Mason, but he is turned to a half wolf/half human. Until then, they have to find the missing instrument for the hillbilly song; Mason is stuck in his half wolf/half human form, leaving Alex embarrassed to be seen with him in public. Meanwhile, Zeke and Harper take care of the Sub Station and Harper tries to make Zeke kiss her all the while. At Zeke's party, Mason's cover is blown and Alex is humiliated, leaving Mason heartbroken and he leaves her. Harper tells Alex about how she always wore eccentric, flashy clothing but Alex wasn't afraid to be seen with her at all and the same should go for Mason. Alex flashes herself into the elevator where Mason is scratching his neck and apologizes and says she loves him and kisses him. They go back to Zeke's apartment, unaffected by everyone's stares and gawks and they dance, laughing at all their good memories when they were an art couple at Tribeca Prep. In the end, Justin finds the missing instrument, the mouth harp, and plays it and Mason is back to his human form. In the meantime, Theresa and Jerry go on an anniversary trip to Connecticut and stay in a cheap motel, using a camera concealed in a teddy bear to check on the Sub Station. Special guest star: Gregg Sulkin as Mason Guest stars: Dan Benson as Zeke, Mary-Pat Green as Ma, Gary Grubbs as Pa Note: This episode is a one-hour special.
79	28	"Wizards Exposed"	Bob Koherr	Richard Goodman	October 15, 2010	330	4.3
The government finds out that the Russo family are wizards, and takes them into custody to find out more. Max and Alex are both interrogated by Agent Lamwood and Scientist One, but both refuse to say anything. When Justin is interrogated, he is tricked into thinking that aliens are going to attack so he reveals that he is a wizard and that they have a wizard lair. Meanwhile, Harper is trying to find out how to contact the wizard world to inform them of the Russo's abduction; she tells Mason who decides to go through the portal to find help. The government raids the wizard world and arrests many wizards, including Professor Crumbs and Chancellor Rudy Tootietootie, as well as Mason along with the Russo family. The Russo family escape the prison and learn that all magic has been switched off. With the help of a magic cootie catcher given by Professor Crumbs, Alex casts a spell duplicating their family three times so they can think of a plan to escape. Scientist One helps the Russo family, Mason, and Rooty Tootietootie escape telling them that Agent Lamwood is crazy because they are supposed to be researching lizards not wizards. The episode ends on a cliffhanger as the Russo family wonder what to do and whether Alex is right in saying they should reveal to the world that wizards exist to save their fellow wizards. Special guest star: Gregg Sulkin as Mason Guest stars: Dan Benson as Zeke, Jonathan Kite as Agent Lamwood, Daryl "Chill" Mitchell as Scientist One, Ian Abercrombie as Professor Crumbs, Andy Kindler as Chancellor Tootietootie Note: This episode ends on a cliffhanger and is resumed in the season 4 opener, "Alex Tells The World".
