= Wizards of Waverly Place season 4 =

Wizards of Waverly Place
- Season 4
- Wizards of Waverly Place season four cast
- No. of episodes: 27

Release
- Original network: Disney Channel
- Original release: November 12, 2010 – January 6, 2012

Season chronology
- ← Previous; Season 3

The fourth and final season of Wizards of Waverly Place aired on Disney Channel from November 12, 2010 to January 6, 2012. The Russo children, Alex (Selena Gomez), Justin (David Henrie), and Max Russo (Jake T. Austin) continue to compete to become the leading wizard in their magical family and begin to make difficult decisions about their futures. Maria Canals Barrera and David DeLuise co-star as their parents and Jennifer Stone co-stars as Alex's best friend, Harper Finkle. This is the second season of the series to be broadcast in high-definition.

== Opening sequence ==
The fourth season of the series features a revamped opening sequence with clips from previous seasons. The opening sequence takes place in the wizard lair at the Russo home. Footage of Alex (Selena Gomez) and Justin Russo (David Henrie) is shown in the Crystal replay ball from the season premiere "Alex Tells the World". Then, a spell book opens and footage of Max Russo (Jake T. Austin) and Harper Finkle (Jennifer Stone) appear. After that, footage of Theresa (Maria Canals Barrera) and Jerry Russo (David DeLuise) are shown in a cauldron. After the footage is played, Alex transports them to Times Square, with Alex waving her wand to reveal the title logo and the name of the series' creator. A new version of the theme song "Everything Is Not What It Seems" was produced for this season.

== Synopsis ==
Alex and Justin are sent back to level one in the wizard competition after "exposing" wizardry in "Alex Tells the World", leaving Max as the most expected to become the family wizard. In "Alex Gives Up", Alex quits the competition, but eventually decides to stay in the competition in "Journey to the Center of Mason" to be with Mason. Before then, Harper tries to get Alex to enjoy life without wizardry. Meanwhile, Justin tries to tutor a class of delinquent wizards.

In the episode "Three Maxes and a Little Lady", Alex and Justin accidentally turn Max into a little girl, Maxine, portrayed by Bailee Madison. She ends up making Alex jealous when their father prefers Maxine over Alex. Maxine remains until "Back to Max". In the episode "Everything's Rosie for Justin", Justin falls in love with Rosie, a guardian angel, but at the end of "Dancing with Angels" she becomes an Angel of Darkness. In "Zeke Finds Out", the Russos finally reveal to Zeke that they are wizards. In "Wizard of the Year", Alex is crowned Wizard of the Year for saving the world from the angels of darkness, and is reinstated in the Wizards Competition. In "Justin's Back In", Justin is reinstated in the Wizard Competition, after his class of delinquent wizards passes.

Meanwhile, Alex's relationship with Mason is jeopardized again when a beast tamer, Chase Riprock, falls in love with Alex and Mason gets jealous. This results in Alex breaking up with Mason. Alex, Justin and Max then save the world from being destroyed by an asteroid. Later, Alex and Harper move into an apartment building with a secret 13th floor for wizards and other creatures in the wizard world. However, it turns out to be a trap made by Gorog to capture the wizards who live in the same floor to make them join the dark side and rule the wizard world. He is defeated and destroyed by Alex, Justin and Max who were using the Power of Three. During this, Alex and Mason get back together and, after a long time, Justin finally gets back together with Juliet.

In the hour-long series finale, Alex, Justin, and Max compete in the family wizard competition. Alex wins and gains full wizardry; Justin becomes a full wizard as well when Professor Crumbs reveals he is retiring as headmaster of WizTech and passes the position to Justin. Jerry also decides to pass down the Waverly Sub Station to Max one day since he is the only child who is not a wizard anymore. The series ends with hugging and Alex saying that they are all happy.

Guest stars and recurring cast include: Gregg Sulkin as Mason Greybeck, Ian Abercrombie as Professor Crumbs, David Barrera as Carlos Cucuy, Samantha Boscarino as Lisa Cucuy, Bill Chott as Mr. Laritate, Frank Pacheco as Felix, Bridgit Mendler as Juliet van Heusen, Daniel Samonas as Dean Moriarty, Bailee Madison as Maxine Russo, Shane Harper as Fidel, Dan Benson as Zeke Beakerman, John Rubinstein as Gorog, Andy Kindler as Chancellor Tootietootie, Fred Stoller as Dexter, Leven Rambin as Rosie, China McClain as Tina, Kari Wahlgren as Helen, Cameron Sanders as Nelvis, Josh Sussman as Hugh Normous, Jackie Evancho as Herself, McKaley Miller as Talia, Valente Rodriguez as Muy Macho, and Nick Roux as Chase Riprock.

== Cast ==
- Selena Gomez as Alex Russo
- David Henrie as Justin Russo
- Jake T. Austin as Max Russo
- Jennifer Stone as Harper Finkle
- Maria Canals Barrera as Theresa Russo
- David DeLuise as Jerry Russo

== Episodes ==
Wizards of Waverly Place Season 4 episodes
No. overall	No. in season	Title	Directed by	Written by	Original release date	Prod. code	U.S. viewers (millions)
80	1	"Alex Tells the World"	Victor Gonzalez	Gigi McCreery & Perry Rein	November 12, 2010	401	4.1
The Russos and Mason finally make it back home, but their wizard powers are still gone. While the family wants to stay quiet, Alex believes that they should take action, so she reveals that they are wizards to reporters and tells them that a group of wizards are being held captive by the government. As she urges them to spread the word, Professor Crumbs appears and tells her that everything that had happened was a test that she failed miserably and orders her to Wizard Court for exposing wizardry to the world. Justin is also ordered to attend because he exposed magic to Agent Lamwood, who was a creation from Professor Crumbs' mind. The judges rule Alex and Justin guilty, and Professor Crumbs sentences them both to be demoted to level one in the Family Wizard Competition, making them behind Max by two levels. Meanwhile, Max sets up traps in the Sub Station for the "government", but ends up falling for one of them. Special guest star: Gregg Sulkin as Mason Guest star: Ian Abercrombie as Professor Crumbs
81	2	"Alex Gives Up"	Victor Gonzalez	Todd J. Greenwald	November 27, 2010	402	N/A
Alex decides to give up the wizard competition to spend more time with Mason and thinks that it does not matter since Max is all the way in the lead, but Chancellor Tootietootie tells Alex that non-wizards and werewolves cannot date, because the werewolf always eats the human. Max's picture on the front of Future Wizards magazine attracts the daughter of a family of Cucuys (mythical Latino monster) and they invite him to a dinner party on their yacht. Alex comes up with a scheme to invite Chancellor Tootietootie to the Cucuy party in hopes of getting him to appeal the law against werewolves and mortals dating. Lisa Cucuy finds out that Mason is a werewolf and decides that she wants him instead of Max. Alex gets jealous when Lisa flirts with Mason, so Alex says embarrassing things about Mason to everyone on the yacht so that he will be mad enough to turn into a werewolf. Carlos and Julie Cucuy jump off the boat as Cucuys are scared of werewolves. Jerry jumps off after them. Alex tells Lisa that she can get off the boat the easy way or her way. Once Lisa jumps off the boat, Chancellor Tootietootie says that their case will not be appealed as by Mason turning into a werewolf proved his point that they are dangerous. In the end, Alex and Mason have to break up to be friends and Harper finishes writing her first novel based on the werewolf-wizard relationship. Jerry tries to get Harper to help him out of the water but accidentally grabs her just finished novel, which causes him to fall back into the water. Meanwhile, Justin tutors a class of delinquent wizards in an attempt to gain a level to re-enter the Wizard Competition. Special guest star: Gregg Sulkin as Mason Guest stars: Andy Kindler as Chancellor Tootietootie, Frank Pacheco as Felix, David Barrera as Carlos Cucuy, Roxana Brusso as Julie Cucuy, Samantha Boscarino as Lisa Cucuy, Kari Wahlgren as Helen
82	3	"Lucky Charmed"	Victor Gonzalez	Justin Varava	December 10, 2010	403	3.0
Harper tries teaching Alex how to live without magic, but the strain of taking responsibility for her actions instead of using magic causes a disagreement between the two best friends when Alex gets in big trouble for crashing Mr. Laritate's car. As punishment, Alex has to clean the school's garbage cans. Mr. Laritate forgives Alex after seeing how the crash influenced her, and Alex realizes that she will be okay without magic. Wanting to thank Harper, Alex uses Mr. Laritate's lucky life-saving hula girl figurine, Leilani, for luck, as Mr. Laritate does. During Harper's driving test, Alex turns into the hula girl and guides Harper through the test, knowing that she might fail. In the end, Harper passes her test. Meanwhile, Jerry wants to pass on the wizard family robe to Max, but Justin has a hard time letting go of it. Guest stars: Bill Chott as Mr. Laritate, Julio Oscar Mechoso as DMV Instructor Absent: Maria Canals Barrera as Theresa Russo
83	4	"Journey to the Center of Mason"	Robbie Countryman	Peter Dirksen	December 17, 2010	404	N/A
After she finds out that she will lose her powers, Alex can no longer date Mason, so they decide to try being best friends instead. After watching a film at the theaters, Harper, Alex, and Mason go home, Dean, who was Alex's Ex-Boyfriend comes and asks Alex to get back together with him. Mason gets jealous. When Dean brings a gift for Alex, Mason then asks what Alex's relationship is with Dean, and Max tells him that Dean and Alex used to date, making Mason more jealous. Mason then turns into a werewolf and eats Dean. Alex, Justin, and Max come up with a solution to turn Justin's toy Captain Jim Bob submarine big and go in it. They then shrink it and go into Mason's mouth. While there, Alex, Max, and Justin see Mason's thoughts, which are all of Alex. They get Dean out, and once Harper, Max, and Justin leave, Alex tells Dean that he was knocked out and the doctor's solution was for them all to dress up as cows. Dean then gives her his offer once again: he wants to get back with her. Alex tells him 'no', and then gets back together with Mason, with deciding to get back to the Wizard Competition. Special guest star: Gregg Sulkin as Mason Guest stars: Daniel Samonas as Dean, Frank Pacheco as Felix, Shoshana Bush as Tyler
84	5	"Three Maxes and a Little Lady"	Victor Gonzalez	Richard Goodman	January 7, 2011	405	4.0
Alex joins Justin's wizard class to try to move up in the competition. Max joins a sophisticated wizard society. They suggest he move the wizard competition up and he moves it to a few days away. Max quits the society because he finds out that they are taking advantage of him. Alex and Justin transform into Max in an attempt to change the date of the family wizard competition back to its original date and succeed. In the end of the episode they accidentally turn Max indefinitely into a little girl. Guest stars: Bailee Madison as Maxine, Frank Pacheco as Felix, Kari Wahlgren as Helen, Shane Harper as Fidel Note: Bailee Madison begins her recurring role as Maxine, the female Max in this episode. Jake T. Austin was absent in four other episodes and returns at the end of the tenth episode "Back to Max".
85	6	"Daddy's Little Girl"	Robbie Countryman	Gigi McCreery & Perry Rein	January 21, 2011	406	3.4
With Max still a little girl, their parents pay more attention to Max (Maxine), and Alex becomes jealous. Justin takes Maxine to her (Max's) karate class and Maxine kicks Justin's butt. After the class, Alex decides to make Jerry's favorite sandwich in order to win his love back, but Maxine comes along with Justin, announcing that she beat Justin in karate, and Jerry immediately falls for her cuteness again. More jealous than ever, Alex comes back with Justin to Maxine's karate class with their parents, having a slight idea of knowing how to change Maxine back to Max. They cast spells on Maxine, Justin using the spell he used on Max that turned him into Maxine, and Alex using the reverse spell. Unfortunately, it only makes Maxine cuter, which makes her furious. Instead of going against the person she was supposed to, she demands that she kicks either Alex or Justin's butt. Justin goes against her, but seeing that he would lose, Alex casts a spell on Justin to make him a karate master. Too fast for Maxine, Justin beats her, and Maxine is hurt (physically). Jerry and Theresa rush to her side, caring for Maxine more than they care that Justin beat Maxine in karate. Justin leaves, and Alex leaves after him, heartbroken. Back at home, Jerry tells Alex that he fell for Maxine because she reminded him of Alex when she was little and they bond again. Meanwhile, Zeke thinks the Russos hate him, but really it was just Harper's alibi in order to keep him away from the Sub Station so as not to make him suspicious about Max's disappearance and Maxine's appearance. Guest stars: Bailee Madison as Maxine, Dan Benson as Zeke, Lanny Joon as Sensei Absent: Jake T. Austin as Max Russo
86	7	"Everything's Rosie for Justin"	Victor Gonzalez	Justin Varava	February 4, 2011	407	3.9
Justin and his delinquent class have a wizard wand dance assessment to do which will get them back in Wiztech. A new student named Rosie joins, whom Justin falls madly in love with to later find out that she is an Angel. Meanwhile, Jerry, Teresa, and Harper try to think of ideas of how to get more people to come to their restaurant. Harper makes cards which customers get hole punched each time they buy a sandwich; when you get 9 hole punches, they get a free sandwich. Contrary to the original purpose, one man punches his own card, demands a free sandwich, and then brings dozens of people into the restaurant, who also have pre-punched cards. Maxine uses her charming cuteness to convince the customers to not exploit her parents. Meanwhile, Justin kicks Rosie out of his class so that it does not fail the wizard dance assessment. Sympathizing, Alex gets Rosie to rejoin the class and puts a copycat spell on her so that Rosie can mimic Alex's move and pass the class. The assessment ends in disaster when a squirrel-frog attaches itself to Alex's foot, and Rosie reveals herself to be an angel. The class fails, but Justin starts dating Rosie. Guest stars: Bailee Madison as Maxine, Frank Pacheco as Felix, Leven Rambin as Rosie, Diane Delano as Penny, Chris Coppola as Customer, Cameron Sanders as Nelvis Absent: Jake T. Austin as Max Russo
87	8	"Dancing with Angels"	Victor Gonzalez	Richard Goodman	February 11, 2011	408	4.5
Justin and Rosie start dating but when their date gets ruined, they want a second date. Alex suggests an Angel Club in Los Angeles, but Rosie says that only Angels are allowed. Maxine will not tell their parents as long as Alex brings her back an Ozzy Osbourne stone. After Justin, Harper and Alex sneak in along with Rosie, Zeedrik asks them if they are angels and they say they are. Back at the sub shop, Theresa and Jerry question Maxine to find out where Justin, Alex and Harper are, and Maxine does not say, so they force her to join a Pageant in order for her to tell them where they are. Things get bad at the angel club when Alex and Harper cannot fly, until Justin secretly pulls out his wand and gives Harper flying powers. Zeedrik still questions them by giving them a test to sing while playing the harp. Though Alex, Justin, and Harper fail to do so, they are accepted as "angels" until the key-chain of Ozzy Osbourne's star reverts to normal. Zeedrik believes they are really angels of darkness, causing everyone in the club to run off, even Rosie. Rosie comes back at the end of the episode to comfort Justin, but when they both look over the city, Rosie's wings are shown to be black, the color of an angel of darkness' wings, but Justin does not see because he is looking forward. Meanwhile, Maxine ends up winning the beauty pageant, making Jerry and Theresa celebrate. Guest stars: Bailee Madison as Maxine, Leven Rambin as Rosie, Ransford Doherty as Zeedrik Absent: Jake T. Austin as Max Russo
88	9	"Wizards vs. Angels"	Victor Gonzalez	Vince Cheung & Ben Montanio	February 18, 2011	409–410	5.1
Rosie is an Angel of Darkness, and has been tricking Justin all along to make him evil. Alex finds out, with the help of Tina (a guardian angel in training trying to earn her wings) that Rosie is an Angel of Darkness. Justin crosses over to the dark side with Rosie, steals the "moral compass", and gives it to Gorog, so Gorog can turn the compass from good to bad, so that the world will be covered in darkness and every human being will be corrupted. Rosie tries to get Justin to run away and save him, because Gorog wants to destroy him, but Justin refuses to leave, stating that he is no longer a wizard but an Angel of Darkness and breaks his wand in halves. Alex tries to convince Justin that he is a wizard, a good wizard and not an Angel of Darkness. Meanwhile, Maxine is enrolled in Tribeca Prep, since she is participating in a "cousin exchange program." After her first day of school, Maxine laments that she has no friends, which leads Harper to insist Maxine have a slumber party (which is really what Harper wants because she has never had a slumber party), that eventually becomes a disaster. Tina reveals that Rosie was a good angel, and her teacher, however, Gorog reached her before her transport arrived and corrupted her. Alex and Tina go to the Dark Realm to save Justin. Alex borrows a pair of wings from the guardian angels. Alex takes the Moral Compass and tries to turn it to good but Justin stops her and then Rosie used her good angel side and they fly up and when they land, Justin turns the compass to good. Tina and Alex take it and run. When Rosie and Justin kiss, Rosie turns into a good angel (with white wings), and Justin loses the dark wings. Guest stars: Bill Chott as Mr. Laritate, Bailee Madison as Maxine, Leven Rambin as Rosie, John Rubinstein as Gorog, China McClain as Tina, Amy Tolsky as Florence Note: This episode is a one-hour special. Absent: Jake T. Austin as Max Russo
89	10	"Back to Max"	Guy Distad	Todd J. Greenwald	March 11, 2011	411	3.7
Justin invites Professor Crumbs to check on his delinquent wizards class, to see how their wizard training is progressing. During the conversation, Maxine interrupts, causing Alex and Justin to panic since they do not know how to explain "Maxine", and they try to find a way to turn Maxine back to Max. Meanwhile, Harper takes a role in the school's "Spirit of America" play, only to be replaced by Maxine. Guest stars: Bill Chott as Mr. Laritate, Ian Abercrombie as Professor Crumbs, Bailee Madison as Maxine, Cameron Sanders as Nelvis, LJ Benet as Little Crumbs, Jackie Evancho as Choir Girl Note: Jake T. Austin returns as Max near the end of the episode. Bailee Madison marks her final appearance as Maxine in this episode.
90	11	"Zeke Finds Out"	David DeLuise	Peter Dirksen	April 8, 2011	412	3.0
When Alex gets bored of Zeke's failing magic tricks, she decides to use magic to make Zeke's tricks come true. Everything goes downhill when Zeke tells Harper he believes he is a wizard and is now booking a magic act at the sub station for a kid's birthday party. Since Justin and Harper are tired of Alex ruining things all the time, they decide to leave everything up to her. Harper, not wanting to let Zeke make a fool of himself, tells Alex to tell Zeke the truth about wizards, but she is reluctant to, as exposing wizardry to another mortal could get her kicked out of the wizard competition forever if anyone finds out. Zeke goes on with his belief that he is a "wizard", but he finds out Harper is keeping a secret from him so he breaks up with her. Alex realizes what a mess she created and on the day of Zeke's magic act, she makes Harper disappear before she can expose wizardry to Zeke, which freaks him out. The Russos really are in deep waters when Zeke is going to saw Max in half with a real saw for his next act, so Justin takes matters into his own hands and freezes everyone except for himself and Zeke. Justin tells Zeke that he is a wizard, not Zeke, and that he did everything. Still not believing him, he flashes Zeke into their lair and unveils the secret to him. They go back outside and tell Harper and Alex who are fighting, that Zeke now knows about the existence of wizards, but he promises he will never tell anyone. Zeke and Harper reconcile their relationship and Alex and Harper apologize and make up with each other. Guest stars: Dan Benson as Zeke, Maurice G. Smith as Big Mitch Absent: Maria Canals Barrera as Theresa Russo, David DeLuise as Jerry Russo
91	12	"Magic Unmasked"	David DeLuise	Justin Varava	May 13, 2011	413	2.7
When a former legendary Luchador "Muy Macho" visits the Sub Station, Alex finds out that she was the reason why he quit lucha libre (wrestling), so she tries to make it up to him by arranging a lucha libre match with him and Jerry to restore his honor. Meanwhile, Zeke asks too many questions about wizardry, so Justin offers to grant him one magical wish if he promised he would stop questioning him about magic. Unfortunately, Zeke's wish is to defeat Muy Macho in the match. Max pretends to like Talia's hobbies, but does not enjoy them. Guest stars: Dan Benson as Zeke, Valente Rodriguez as Muy Macho, McKaley Miller as Talia
92	13	"Meet the Werewolves"	Victor Gonzalez	David Henrie	June 17, 2011	415	4.0
When Alex asks Mason if she can meet his parents, Mason shows his fake parents and she finds out soon after. She gets upset at Mason and demands him to take her to his real parents. Mason takes her to the Autumn Moon Feast (werewolf holiday) to meet his parents. Soon after that Alex finds out he told his parents that she is a werewolf and is frustrated. She uses a spell to change herself and Harper into werewolves. She tries to be the worst werewolf possible in front of Mason's parents during the feast. In the end Mason's parents like her as a werewolf and she says to him that they do not know the real her. She begins to leave and he says that he truly loves Alex to his parents and that she is a wizard. She changes back to a wizard and Mason turns back to human form. After the parents find out they try to eat her and Mason and Alex make a near escape. Meanwhile Max makes his parents' food taste like kid food in order to make it taste good. Afterwards Jerry and Theresa eat it, and as a result they act like little kids. Justin thinks he will have to fix it but Max comments on how he does not need help, as he will be the future family wizard. Max uses another spell on cookies to make them older, but they turn into teenagers. Finally, Justin uses a spell on a pizza to turn them back into their regular selves. Special guest star: Gregg Sulkin as Mason Guest stars: Harry Van Gorkum as Grant Greybeck, Robin Riker as Linda Greybeck, Marianne Muellerleile as Molly, Eric Zuckerman as Bill
93	14	"Beast Tamer"	Victor Gonzalez	Gigi McCreery & Perry Rein	June 24, 2011	416	4.0
When Alex, Justin and Max win four tickets to the "Beast Bowl", the tickets are delivered by Beast Tamer Chase Riprock, who begins flirting with Alex and invites the group for a pre-bowl tour. Alex invites Mason to go with them but he says he cannot. During the tour, despite Chase's warnings, Justin attempts to tame the beast so that Max can have his photo taken with the beast, but both are caught and banned from the event. Chase tries to kiss Alex but she rejects him and returns to the mortal world where she finds Mason coming out a hardware store. Mason is evasive about his plans, which involve making an anniversary present for Alex, so Alex returns to the Beast Bowl. Harper tells Mason that Chase likes Alex and urges him to surprise her with the gift at the Beast Bowl. Meanwhile, Justin and Max return to the Beast Bowl disguised as beast taming clowns where they allow the beast to escape and snatch Alex who throws the whip to Chase. Chase tames the beast who drops Alex and Mason is able to reveal his gift, which is a sculpture of himself and Alex. Alex and Mason leave together, with the sculpture. Special guest star: Gregg Sulkin as Mason Guest star: Nick Roux as Chase Absent: Maria Canals Barrera as Theresa Russo, David DeLuise as Jerry Russo
94	15	"Wizard of the Year"	Victor Gonzalez	Richard Goodman	July 8, 2011	417	3.6
Alex has been crowned Wizard of the Year after saving the world from dark angels, as well as being reinstated in the Wizard Competition, and a banquet honoring her achievement is hosted. With paparazzi in tow, Chase Riprock visits the lair to congratulate Alex. As he leaves, Keith Keith hounds them about being in a romantic relationship, to which Alex states she already has a boyfriend. Later, Mason and Alex watch his gossip segment, and to their horror, Keith Keith confirms that Chase and Alex are dating. For Alex winning Wizard of the Year, the Russo family must record a holographic video congratulating Alex. However, much to Justin's displeasure, Justin's video instead only contains him complaining about Alex. The night of the awards banquet, Mason stands Alex up, leaving her devastated. At the banquet, Chancellor TootieTootie tells Justin that his display of affection and pride for Alex may reinstate him into the competition, causing Justin to be frantic and do everything within his power to destroy the tape. However, because Justin's rant was presented, Justin's reinstatement into the competition gets rescinded. Chase purposely invites himself to sit at the Russo's table. However, Mason shows up late and sees Alex and Chase flirting together. A short battle ensues between Mason and Chase. Alex soon breaks up the fight, and is forced to choose either Mason or Chase. Appalled by both of their behaviors that evening, Alex chooses neither and breaks up with Mason. Special guest star: Gregg Sulkin as Mason Guest stars: Andy Kindler as Chancellor Tootietootie, Nick Roux as Chase, Justin Guarini as Keith Keith
95	16	"Misfortune at the Beach"	Jody Margolin Hahn	Vince Cheung & Ben Montanio	July 24, 2011	420	3.5
The Russos head to the beach on an extremely hot day, and Harper hopes to enjoy reading her book while at the beach. The Russos come across Zelzar, a fortune-telling machine. Jerry warns the kids about Zelzar – he is from the wizard world, and a wizard's fortune really comes true. After Max and Justin receive good fortunes, Alex decides to get a fortune despite her father's warning. However, her fortune says, "Say good-bye to your life." Alex thinks nothing of it and proceeds to enjoy the day at the beach, but comes close to life-threatening situations multiple times. Alex, Justin, Max, and Harper make a compromise with Zelzar – if they can extract him from the machine and let him enjoy a day at the beach, he will take back Alex's fortune. Max replaces Zelzar, and Justin is forced to drive the beach-goers away from the machine (as Max gives out silly fortunes about his new facial hair); meanwhile, the girls help Zelzar fancy his day at the beach. In the end, Zelzar reveals that while he cannot take away Alex's fortune, he can give it to the next person. The next person happens to be a little girl, who gets Alex's fortune. However, it is revealed that a man from Random Prize Giveaway shows up, saying: "Say good-bye to your life because we're randomly giving you one million dollars!" Guest stars: Michael Carbonaro as Zelzar, John J. York as Game Show Host
96	17	"Wizards vs. Asteroid"	Victor Gonzalez	Peter Dirksen	August 19, 2011	418	3.6
When it is announced that a huge asteroid is hurtling towards the earth, the Russos decide to hide in the wizard world, but Alex, Justin, and Max change their minds and go into space to destroy the asteroid. Meanwhile, Alex finds out that she is not graduating high school, but when a small part of the asteroid hits the school and destroys the school records, she recreates hers with passing grades and is able to graduate. Guest stars: Dan Benson as Zeke, Bill Chott as Mr. Laritate, Kristina Hayes as Reporter
97	18	"Justin's Back In"	Guy Distad	Todd J. Greenwald	August 26, 2011	419	3.2
Justin's class of delinquent wizards has completed their studies, which means they are eligible to rejoin WizTech if they all pass their final evaluation. When they all fail, Alex suspects something is not right. She uncovers the truth – the class had actually passed, but it's revealed that the historian who checked the exams is evil and he lied about the exam scores. He traps Alex with a water spell, so Justin and his class need to stop him and save Alex. Felix, one of the students in the class, is able to save the day by pulling the most powerful wand in the wizard world out of a crystal ball and using it. This means that he is actually the descendant of a famous wizard who had previously been thought to have no living descendants. Justin's class is revealed to have passed the final exam, so they are readmitted into WizTech and Justin is officially back in the family wizard competition. Meanwhile, Jerry and Theresa realize that they never saved any of Max's childhood accomplishments, so they try to recreate them with the help of Harper. During the credits, it is revealed that Max had kept his favorite memories all along. Special guest star: Tim Conway as Cragmont Guest stars: Ian Abercrombie as Professor Crumbs, Frank Pacheco as Felix, Cameron Sanders as Nelvis
98	19	"Alex the Puppetmaster"	Victor Gonzalez	Gigi McCreery & Perry Rein	September 16, 2011	421	3.0
Alex and Harper decide to do a puppet show to raise money for a new apartment, and Zeke and Justin help them. Unfortunately, Alex forgets to write the script for the show. Harper gets mad and decides to do the show on her own and makes her puppets act out the way Alex treats her. Alex makes Justin and Zeke puppets for her own show and steals Harper's crowd, which makes Harper upset. Then Alex apologizes to Harper using the puppets and they make up. Meanwhile, Talia's parents meet Theresa and Jerry for the first time, but it does not go well. Justin puts a spell on Talia's parents to forget they ever meet Theresa and Jerry. They meet again and end up getting along, but this results in Theresa and Jerry having to reluctantly attend a 16-hour play. Special guest star: Joely Fisher as Meg Robinson Guest stars: Dan Benson as Zeke, James Urbaniak as Rob Robinson, McKaley Miller as Talia
99	20	"My Two Harpers"	Victor Gonzalez	Manny Basanese	September 30, 2011	422	3.03
Harper and Zeke spend so much time together that Alex decides to make a Harper-clone. Justin comes up with various ideas to save money in the sub-shop and Max starts a fast-food restaurant in the wizard world. Guest star: Dan Benson as Zeke Absent: Maria Canals Barrera as Theresa Russo
100	21	"Wizards of Apartment 13B"	Guy Distad	Justin Varava	October 7, 2011	423	3.54
Alex and Harper receive a flyer with an ad for an apartment. They meet the apartment owner, Dexter, who shows them Apartment 13B, which is on a secret floor for non-humans. They rent it, but Harper is forced to pretend she's magical by using a training wand that can only open things. Later at their apartment, they realize Mason lives on the same floor. Mason will stop at nothing to win Alex back; Alex tells him she does not want a boyfriend, but Mason is relentless. That night, Alex and Harper throw a housewarming party, which the whole floor attends, including Mason and Felix. Mason uses Harper's wand to open Alex's heart. However, she flirts with an ugly ogre because he's the first person she sees. Mason tries again, but makes Alex open her heart to Felix this time. Meanwhile, Theresa and Jerry trick Justin into going to Alex's apartment so they can have some peace and quiet. When Justin arrives, he fixes the mess Mason made by activating the child safety lock on Harper's wand and it is revealed that despite his eagerness to send her away, Justin misses Alex. Alex, freed from Mason's spell, is angry at Mason, and Mason, deflated, leaves. Outside their door, Dexter turns into Gorog when no one is looking. He wants revenge. Max keeps coming to the apartment uninvited, and when Harper and Alex kick him out, he encounters Gorog, who gives him a flyer for a free wizard camp. Max excitedly says he'll ask his parents about it. Special guest star: Gregg Sulkin as Mason Guest stars: John Rubinstein as Gorog, Frank Pacheco as Felix, Fred Stoller as Dexter, Christopher Douglas Reed as Ogre Note: This episode is the first of a four-part story arc. It also doubles as the series' 100th episode.
101	22	"Ghost Roommate"	David DeLuise	Richard Goodman	October 14, 2011	424	4.10
Alex and Harper have trouble paying the apartment bills, so Dexter recommends getting a roommate. Alex and Harper find a wealthy ghost named Lucy, who they let move in. Meanwhile, Justin orders a robot to help Zeke at the sub station, as Justin is busy studying for the wizard competition. The robot is lost in transit, but Dexter (Gorog in disguise) makes an evil robot to spy on Justin to pass information to Gorog. While Zeke and the robot are working, the robot asks him about Justin and the wizard competition, which confuses Zeke because no one had talked about it in front of the robot. Later that night, Lucy starts crying and explains that her boyfriend Donny had disappeared sixty years prior in a plane accident. Alex tries to set Lucy up with Justin, but he makes matters worse. Later, Lucy meets Mason and they go out on a long date, which makes Alex jealous. Meanwhile, the robot again asks Zeke about the wizard world and Zeke realizes that the robot might have a secret agenda. He tells Justin, who simply does not believe him and is ignorant of the situation because of his intensive studying. Because of her jealousy, Alex helps Lucy locate Donny, who had been stranded on an island in the Bermuda Triangle. They soon reconnect, but not after Alex realizes that she cannot get back home, due to heavy magnetic currents interfering with her magic. Mason goes to save Alex after he finds out that she had left for the Bermuda Triangle. The robot attacks Justin and Zeke after they find him scanning the spell book. Mason and Alex manage to get off of the island using the Bermuda shorts given to them by Justin. The robot is shown giving Gorog the spell he needed that he got from the Russos. Special guest star: Gregg Sulkin as Mason Guest stars: Dan Benson as Zeke, Fred Stoller as Dexter, Josh Sussman as Hugh Normous, Linsey Godfrey as Lucy, Travis Caldwell as Donny, Michael Carbonaro as Robot Note: This episode is the second of a four-part story arc. Absent: Jake T. Austin as Max Russo, Maria Canals Barrera as Theresa Russo, David DeLuise as Jerry Russo
102	23	"Get Along, Little Zombie"	Victor Gonzalez	Peter Dirksen	October 21, 2011	425	3.42
Alex and Harper are going to their apartment when they run into Mr. Laritate, who also lives in their building. Felix tells Justin he broke his wand and Justin informs him that it's fake, because he found batteries in it. He concludes that someone stole Felix's wand. Dexter is showing a zombie to the 13th floor and he introduces them to Alex and Harper. Mason, who will stubbornly not stop asking Alex on a date, surprises them in the elevator. When Alex ignores him, Mason messes with the buttons so he can spend more time with her and they land on the second floor. Justin tells Jerry that Felix lost his wand and Jerry tells them to use the abracadoobler wand app. Felix realizes that his wand is still somewhere around his building. Meanwhile, because Mason messed with the buttons in the elevator, all the humans in the building have discovered the mysterious 13th floor. Alex lies and tells the humans that they accidentally got into a secret haunted house. Mr. Laritate, after all the other humans leave, discovers the 13th floor too and sees Alex, Harper, and Mason. Mr. Laritate notices all the strange people, and when Alex explains they're in a haunted house, Mr. Laritate does not believe her. The zombie bites Mr. Laritate and turns him into a zombie. They take him to their apartment while Alex looks for a spell to make Mr. Laritate human again. Mr. Laritate runs away and Alex, Harper, and Mason suspect he went square dancing. Professor Crumbs questions Felix, who mentions the secret 13th floor, something Crumbs wasn't aware existed, so they go to investigate. At Waverly Place, they're throwing a festival while Alex tells Jerry what happened. Alex and Mason, trying to sneak the zombie into the restaurant, are forced into the dance. They then, after Harper causes a distraction, take Laritate into the restaurant and give him a medicine from the wizard world that makes Laritate human again. He remembers nothing and goes outside to dance. Alex kisses Mason on the cheek, and he suggests they just be friends, but Alex decides they should get back together. Harper, Mason, and Alex return to the 13th floor where they run into Justin, Felix and Crumbs. Justin tells them that the 13th floor should not exist. Crumbs thinks that something evil is going on. Dexter then appears with dark angel wings and it is revealed he stole Felix's wand. Dexter tricks Felix into turning to the dark side in return for his wand. Felix casts a spell that traps them all on the floor. Special guest star: Gregg Sulkin as Mason Guest stars: Bill Chott as Mr. Laritate, Ian Abercrombie as Professor Crumbs, Frank Pacheco as Felix, Fred Stoller as Dexter, Regan Burns as Everett, Jane Carr as Martha St. Claire Note: This episode is the third of a four-part story arc. Absent: Jake T. Austin as Max Russo, Maria Canals Barrera as Theresa Russo
103	24	"Wizards vs. Everything"	Victor Gonzalez	Gigi McCreery & Perry Rein	October 28, 2011	426	3.44
Dexter reveals himself as Gorog and that he is trying to rebuild his army of darkness. Felix uses a spell that makes all the tenants from the 13th floor leave with him, all except Alex, Justin, and Harper, who are left behind. A hand gestures for them to go through the trash chute. They realize only mortals can escape the spell-locked room and Alex convinces Harper to go through the trash chute. Harper then arrives in the wizard lair. Gorog takes the kidnapped wizards to his evil lair and he tricks Hugh Normous into becoming one of the evil wizards in his army, while professor Crumbs fakes being evil. Max returns from wizard camp to help Harper, suggesting they look for spells in the wizard books. Gorog makes his dark army dig an interdimensional tunnel to the wizard world so they can conquer it. Gorog also manages to lure Mason to the dark side. Gorog makes Felix open a black hole in Alex's apartment that almost sucks Alex and Justin inside. Crumbs attempts to stop the dark army from storming the wizard world. Felix tries to get rid of Crumbs on Gorog's order, but Crumbs arrives at the wizard lair after teleporting himself and switching Felix's wand for a fake one. Max suggests they put another black hole in the wizard lair that connects to the one in Alex's apartment. He goes in and rescues Alex and Justin. They arrive at Gorog's lair and attempt to stop him, while Mason tries to convince Alex to join them. Gorog also reveals Juliet, Justin's ex-girlfriend who is young again, and she convinces Justin to join. Alex and Max also surrender, but when Gorog lets his guard down, the three of them use their combined magic to get rid of him, freeing all the supernatural beings from his influence. Juliet and Justin get back together. Back home, Alex tricks Harper into moving back in the Russos' basement by making her think all the wizards and supernatural creatures who lost their homes were going to stay in the living room. Special guest stars: Gregg Sulkin as Mason, Bridgit Mendler as Juliet van Heusen Guest stars: Ian Abercrombie as Professor Crumbs, John Rubinstein as Gorog, Frank Pacheco as Felix, Fred Stoller as Dexter, Josh Sussman as Hugh Normous, Christopher Douglas Reed as Ogre Note: This episode is the fourth and final part of a four-part story arc. Absent: Maria Canals Barrera as Theresa Russo, David DeLuise as Jerry Russo
104	25	"Rock Around the Clock"	Guy Distad	Robert Boesel	November 4, 2011	414	3.78
The current landlord of the Russo's building decides to sell the sub shop, evicting the Russos of the shop, as well as their apartment and lair, which contains their portal. Without the portal, the Russos will lose all contact with the Wizard world. So, the entire family (along with Harper) travel back to 1957 to stop Jerry's father (the previous owner of the shop) from selling the shop to the landlord, so that they do not get evicted. Jerry's father agrees not to sell the shop, and the Russos return to present day. However, they accidentally leave Harper behind when Harper is distracted by a woman with a poodle, and Harper suggests that the woman should put a picture of a poodle on her skirt, creating a poodle skirt, which were popular in the 1950s. Back in present day, the Russos (who have not yet realized Harper's absence) find the sub shop obsolete, boarded up, and empty, with the subway car and the lair missing, too. The Russos realized that they have messed with the fabric of time, and something they did while time-traveling in 1957 must have created a ripple effect, and affected present day. While Alex suggests that they go back to 1957 to find out what they did wrong, Justin denies this, saying they should not solve the problem by doing exactly what caused the problem, however Theresa states that they will have to go back, when she realizes that they left Harper in 1957. The Russos return to 1957, where Jerry's father reveals that he did not sell the restaurant to the landlord, however the restaurant failed to make enough business, and that he has been forced to close it. Justin realizes that when Jerry's father lost the restaurant, he moved out of the building and since their family no longer lived in the building, the lair disappeared in present day. The Russos decide just to find Harper and go back to present day, and discover that Harper enrolled at Tribeca Prep as soon as they forgot her in 1957, as Harper did not want to ruin her perfect attendance record. Justin, Alex, and Max go to Tribeca Prep to retrieve Harper, while Jerry and Theresa wait at the sub shop, however Harper decides to stay in the past, as she finds new popularity in 1957 that she does not experience in present day. While at Tribeca, Max introduces the high-five to several students. Alex realizes that if they make the sub shop the 1957 high school hangout, the sub shop will get better business and will not have to close. However, no one has any fun at the sub shop that night as the jukebox is broken. Just as everyone is about to leave, Max plugs his MP3 player into the jukebox and Harper uses her popularity to get the students dancing and having fun at the shop, and the business at the sub shop peaks. The Russos return to the present day, where the lair and the sub shop are back, and Jerry owns the entire building, while the landlord is now the owner of a Janitor service, instead of the building, and the high-five is now called a "Max". Alex then remembers that they forgot Harper back in 1957 and they go back and get her. (the Russos accidentally end up in 1977 twice in the episode, thanks to Justin) Guest stars: Brendan Bradley as Hank, Carlo Michael Mancini as Lenny Hune
105	26	"Harperella"	Victor Gonzalez	Richard Goodman & Justin Varava	November 18, 2011	427	3.47
The episode begins on Waverly Place where Harper is reading a storybook to a group of children when Alex pushes her away. Alex explains that it's a Wizard Storybook, a magical storybook that has the power of turning what the person reads real. Then Harper is teleported into the loft where Theresa, her evil (or "wicked" as she referred) stepmother calls her Harperella (a combination of Harper and Cinderella) and forces her to do the chores. Then her evil stepbrothers, Justin and Max come down and give her laundry to her wash. Later Harper is washing the Waverly Substation when Alex appears, as she is Harper's fairy godmother. Alex explains to Harper that the fairy tale has to run as it's supposed to before things can go back to the way they were and then vanishes. Then Max comes in and says that the prince charming has decided to use the Substation to be the ballroom for the royal party. Harper says that she can go to the party but her stepfamily laughs at her. Back in the loft Harper summons Alex, she uses a spell to transform Harper's bookdress into a princess gown and glass bowls into glass slippers. They go down (through the door) into the street and Alex turns the hot dog stand into a carriage to take Harper to the party. There she dances with prince charming, Zeke. At the stroke of midnight she goes outside leaving her glass slipper behind. Then, to both girls' shock, Justin, Max and Zeke (with pig noses) rush inside the substation being chased by the big, bad wolf, Mason. Alex realizes that some pages are missing and Cinderella and three little pigs stories were blended together. The pig-turned boys and Harper rush into the loft being chased by Mason. While Alex finds the pages Harper has to keep Mason from eating Zeke (who built the straw house), Alex eventually finds the book pages in a drawer along with other book pages. Alex tries a page from Max's favourite magic trick book then David Copperfield comes into the room and does some magic tricks which impresses Harper. But another page that Alex tried was from Justin's science book and a caveman appeared, but the caveman has a thing for Harper. So when Harper is impressed by the magic trick he is jealous and tries to attack David Copperfield. Alex finds the right pages and the story goes back to Cinderella. Zeke Charming comes in and Theresa tries to wear the slipper but fails. Then Harper tries it and fits. She and Zeke go back to the royal party where they dance and then the story ends and the world is returned to its normality. Last but not least, Harper was back in the real world and she lived happily ever after. Finally, Alex planned that Harper and Zeke dance because they were great when they danced in romance, so they practiced but they were really bad. The ball dance is turned into a clogging dance. Special guest stars: David Copperfield as himself, Gregg Sulkin as Mason Guest star: Dan Benson as Zeke Absent: David DeLuise as Jerry Russo
106	27	"Who Will Be the Family Wizard?"	Victor Gonzalez	Vince Cheung & Ben Montanio (Part 1); Todd J. Greenwald (Part 2)	January 6, 2012	428–429	9.76
During a dinner that Alex made for the family, Professor Crumbs visits to reveal that with this selfless act, the Russo children can finally have their family wizard competition. Round one of the competition is a trivia round, in which questions related to magic are asked. During this round, Harper and Zeke appear. Zeke has accidentally smelled a purple substance in the lair that caused him to turn purple. This causes a griffin to kidnap him and Harper. Alex, Justin and Max use their three time-outs to go and rescue their friends. They make it back, only to discover that they have been gone too long and have been disqualified from the competition. They all return home, where the lair disappears and they all lose their magic, thus becoming mortals. Justin and Max begin to hate Alex because of her insistence on saving Zeke and Harper resulting in them losing. Convinced that the loss of their powers has ruined the family, Jerry decides to sell the sub shop. The kids go for weeks without magic, during which, slowly gaining back trust in each other as they reopen and run the shop. Suddenly, they are returned to the area of the Wizard Competition, where the host reveals that the griffin attack (while intended to kidnap Professor Crumbs) and the weeks they went without magic were tests to test their family bond. They enter the final round of the competition, a massive labyrinth. The first out of the maze will win. Justin makes it out first and is declared the Family Wizard. However, he decides he cannot accept this because Alex was about to get out first: Justin had been trapped by magical vines and Alex, near the exit, came back to help. Alex is thus declared the true family wizard. Professor Crumbs, proud of Justin's integrity in telling the truth, declares that he is going to retire as Headmaster of Wiz-Tech and declares Justin the new headmaster, granting him full wizard powers. Considering Max is the only Russo child that does not get powers or becomes a full wizard, Jerry thus decides to one day pass down the sub shop to Max, which he happily accepts. It ends with the Russo family hugging and gathering together with Alex stating that they are all finally happy at the same time. Special guest stars: Gregg Sulkin as Mason, Bridgit Mendler as Juliet van Heusen Guest stars: Dan Benson as Zeke, Ian Abercrombie as Professor Crumbs, Andy Kindler as Chancellor Tootietootie Notes: This episode is a one-hour special. On Disney+, this episode is split into two parts and is simply called "Finale".
