= Wizards of Waverly Place: The Movie =

2009 film directed by Lev L. Spiro

- Promotional poster
- Genre: Fantasy; comedy-drama
- Based on: Wizards of Waverly Place by Todd J. Greenwald
- Written by: Dan Berendsen
- Directed by: Lev L. Spiro
- Starring: Selena Gomez; David Henrie; Jake T. Austin; Jennifer Stone; Maria Canals-Barrera; Steve Valentine; Xavier Enrique Torres; Jennifer Alden; David DeLuise
- Theme music composer: Kenneth Burgomaster
- Country of origin: United States
- Original language: English

Production
- Producers: Kevin Lafferty; Todd J. Greenwald; Peter Murrieta
- Cinematography: David A. Makin
- Editor: Matthew Colonna
- Running time: 98 minutes
- Production companies: Pretty River Productions, LLC; It's a Laugh Productions

Original release
- Network: Disney Channel
- Release: August 28, 2009

Wizards of Waverly Place: The Movie is a 2009 American fantasy comedy drama television film based on the Disney Channel Original Series Wizards of Waverly Place. It was directed by Lev L. Spiro and filmed primarily in San Juan, Puerto Rico in February and March 2009. The full cast of the series starred in the film, although Jennifer Stone only had a small role at the beginning of the film. The film takes place between the second and third seasons, and focuses on Alex Russo having to reverse a wish she made that her parents never met after being grounded during a trip to the Caribbean.

The film premiered on August 28, 2009, on the Disney Channel in the United States. It received 11.4 million viewers at its premiere, making it the second-most-viewed Disney Channel Original Movie premiere at that time, after High School Musical 2. It was also cable's No. 1 scripted telecast of 2009 in total viewers. It premiered in the UK and Ireland on October 23, 2009, as part of Wiz-Tober 2009. It was released on DVD on December 15, 2009, as an Extended Edition. The film won the 2010 Primetime Emmy Award for Outstanding Children's Program.

== Plot ==
Jerry and Theresa Russo and their three children: Justin, Alex, and Max, embark on a magic-free vacation to the Caribbean, home to the Stone of Dreams, a powerful magical object capable of reversing any spell or granting any wish. They are asked by street magician and former wizard Archie to help find the Stone and turn his parrot, Giselle, back into a human. Jerry refuses, explaining that many wizards have disappeared searching for it.

Later, Theresa catches Alex trying to use magic to get away from her family, leading to an argument that results in Alex being grounded and losing magic privileges. In a fit of rage, Alex wishes that her parents had never met. Alex's smuggled wand and spellbook accidentally grant her wish and create an alternate reality where Jerry and Theresa do not remember their kids and do not know each other.

Jerry, having never met Theresa, retains his powers and catches the siblings trying to steal his spellbook. Jerry explains to Justin that, as a result of Alex's wish, the siblings will lose their memories and disappear forever within 48 hours. Justin resolves to find the Stone of Dreams. Max begins losing his memories and convinces Jerry to help them. Theresa also joins, believing that they are simply treasure hunting.

Alex and Justin succeed in finding the Stone of Dreams, but it is stolen by Giselle. The siblings explain their situation, which Theresa does not believe. Jerry mentions that a Full Wizard—a wizard granted full magical power through a family competition—can reverse the spell. Shortly after, Max is erased from existence into a vortex, during which Theresa remembers him at the last minute, realizing that they were telling the truth. Jerry teleports Justin and Alex to a battlefield to compete against each other. Jerry explains that the winner will become a Full Wizard, and the loser will permanently lose their powers. Alex wins but turns to Justin for help in reversing the wish, admitting that he is the more skilled wizard. However, Justin has already lost his memories and is erased from existence.

Meanwhile, Theresa returns to the resort and notices Giselle in human form with the Stone on her necklace. Giselle admits that she used Archie to get the Stone before he takes it and turns her back into a parrot before giving it to Theresa. Alex asks Jerry for help, but he replies that it is too late to help out. Using the Stone, Theresa returns and gives it to Alex. Jerry advises her that she can bring back her brothers and retain status as a Full Wizard, but Alex chooses to return everything to how it was. She is transported back to the argument with Theresa, who doesn't recall the argument. The alternate reality world is erased and forgotten about and Alex reunites with her family as they enjoy their vacation.

== Cast ==
- Selena Gomez as Alex Russo, the selfish and rebellious middle child of the Russo family who does not want to go on vacation with her family to the Caribbean; casts a spell wishing her parents never met after being grounded by Theresa, and has to fix her mistake before time erases the Russo siblings and Alex herself.
- David Henrie as Justin Russo, Alex and Max's responsible and uptight older brother who has the family wand and Book of Forbidden Spells in his possession.
- Jake T. Austin as Max Russo, Alex and Justin's absentminded and mischievous younger brother.
- Jennifer Stone as Harper Finkle, Alex's best friend, a mortal, whom she wants to stay with while her family goes on vacation.
- Maria Canals-Barrera as Theresa Russo, Alex, Justin, and Max's mother who has declared the family vacation magic free.
- David DeLuise as Jerry Russo, Alex, Justin, and Max's father. A former family wizard who gave up his powers in order to marry Theresa.
- Steve Valentine as Archie, a former wizard turned horrible magician who wants to get the Stone of Dreams in order to change his girlfriend, Giselle, back to human form.
- Xavier Enrique Torres as Javier, an attractive activities counselor at the resort where the Russo family is staying whom Alex has a crush on.
- Jennifer Alden as Giselle, Archie's girlfriend who was turned into a parrot.

== Production ==
=== Casting ===
The full cast of the Disney Channel Original Series Wizards of Waverly Place appeared in the film. However, Jennifer Stone as Harper Finkle only appeared in a supporting role, appearing at the beginning of the film, and did not star.

=== Filming ===
Wizards of Waverly Place: The Movie was filmed primarily in San Juan, Puerto Rico between February and March 2009, the second Disney Channel Original Movie filmed in Puerto Rico after Princess Protection Program, also starring Selena Gomez. Hotel scenes were shot at the Caribe Hilton Hotel in San Juan, while the main cave scene, where Alex, Justin and Archie are climbing inside the cave, was shot inside Cueva Ventana in Arecibo as well as a land that sits in the Río Grande de Arecibo valley in front of the mountain where the cave resides in which Alex asks for directions to the cave. The ancient battlefield where Alex and Justin compete to be the family wizard takes place at the Castillo San Felipe del Morro in the Old San Juan. The subway scene where the train from the platform is shown was shot in Toronto, despite the series being based in New York City.

=== Promotion ===
Selena Gomez recorded a "Magic" cover for the film that is featured on the soundtrack for the film and television show. A sneak peek of the film aired during the conclusion of the four-part "Wizards vs. Vampires" event on Disney Channel on August 8, 2009, and on Family Channel during the week of August 24, 2009. The What's What Edition of the film premiered on October 24, 2009, on Disney Channel.

== Release ==
The film premiered on Disney Channel as a Disney Channel Original Movie on August 28, 2009. The film premiered in the UK and Ireland on October 23, 2009, as part of Wiz-Tober 2009. The film premiered in Spain on October 11, 2009, as part of Magoctubre 2009 in Spain.

=== Ratings ===
The film garnered 11.4 million viewers on its premiere night, making it cable's No. 1 scripted telecast of 2009 and Disney Channel's second-most-viewed film premiere after High School Musical 2. On its second night, the film's second showing received 5.8 million viewers. The next day, the film's third showing got 4.3 million viewers, and its fourth showing received 4.7 million viewers. When the film premiered in the UK, as part of Wiz-tober, the film received 1.0 million viewers, which made it the 7th-most-watched program on multi-channel viewing for that week, and the second-highest views watched on Disney Channel UK.

=== What's What Edition ===
The "What's What Edition" of the film premiered on October 24, 2009, on Disney Channel, part of a Wizards of Waverly Place marathon. The "What's What Edition" featured exclusive behind-the-scenes information on the film during the presentation.

=== Soundtrack ===
In an interview with Disney Channel's commercial-segment, Disney 365, Selena Gomez discussed her interpretations of the songs on the soundtrack saying: "'Disappear' is more of a romantic song. It's basically talking about how a girl likes a guy and they [she] don't want him to disappear, and then 'Magical' is about casting a spell on a guy and this song, 'Magic', ties into Wizards of Waverly Place: The Movie". Although recorded for an episode, "Make it Happen" doesn't appear on the album, for an unknown reason. The album includes songs from and inspired by the TV series and Wizards of Waverly Place: The Movie. "Magic" by Selena Gomez is a digital single on the iTunes Store. The song was released on July 21, 2009, as part of the Radio Disney iTunes Pass. "Magic" premiered on Radio Disney and a music video to Disney Channel on July 24. The song's music video has Gomez singing into a microphone with bright and flamboyant background, as well as including clips from Wizards of Waverly Place: The Movie. "Magic" debuted at no. 61 in the Billboard Hot 100 with 42,000 downloads.

== Home media ==
The film was released on DVD in the United States and Canada on December 15, 2009, as an "Extended Edition", which also came with a replica of the Stone of Dreams in a necklace. The film is in English, French and Spanish, and has subtitles in the same languages. The film was also released on DVD in Australia on December 15, 2009, in Germany and France on December 2, 2009, and in the United Kingdom on February 22, 2010.

== Awards and nominations ==
Year	Award	Category	Recipient	Result
2010	Golden Reel Award	Best Sound Editing: Long Form Sound Effects and Foley in Television	Wizards of Waverly Place: The Movie	Nominated
2010	Imagen Award	Best Actress/Television	Selena Gomez	Nominated
2010	Imagen Award	Best Supporting Actress/Television	Maria Canals-Barrera	Won
2010	Imagen Award	Best Children's Program	Peter Murrieta and Kevin Lafferty	Nominated
2010	NAACP Image Award	Outstanding Children's Program	Peter Murrieta and Kevin Lafferty	Nominated
2010	62nd Primetime Emmy Awards	Outstanding Children's Program	Peter Murrieta and Kevin Lafferty	Won

== Marketing ==
The film's first teaser trailer was released on Disney Channel on June 17, 2009. The full-length trailer was released on June 26, 2009, during the premiere of Selena Gomez's other Disney Channel Original Movie, Princess Protection Program.

== Proposed sequel ==
In June 2010, production of a second film was announced. Dan Berendsen was to return as script writer for the film. Since that announcement, no other updates were made about the sequel. On April 25, 2011, Selena Gomez confirmed in an interview that the proposed sequel would not be filmed. However, on July 28, 2011, Maria Canals-Barrera stated in an interview that the project was "not 100% dead anymore" and that she was "hopeful" that a second film would be produced. Later, it was confirmed that the "Wizards" would return in a special event entitled The Wizards Return: Alex vs. Alex in early 2013.

== See also ==
- List of Wizards of Waverly Place episodes
- List of Disney Channel original films
- List of Disney Channel series
