= Guy Distad =

American television director

- Occupation: Television director
- Years active: 1989–present

Guy Distad is an American television director best known for his work at Disney Channel and Disney XD.

Distad began his career in 1989 as production assistant on Roseanne and became an assistant director in 1990, a position he held for three years. He has worked as first assistant director on Wizards of Waverly Place and directed seven episodes of the show before it ended in 2012. He also directed numerous episodes of My Wife and Kids from 2003 to 2005. In addition to Wizards of Waverly Place, other Disney shows that Distad has served as a director or assistant director for include Hannah Montana, Jessie, Lab Rats, Liv and Maddie, Coop & Cami Ask the World, Sydney to the Max, and The Villains of Valley View.
