= Peter Murrieta =

American television producer and writer

- Born: March 23, 1966 (age 59); Tucson, Arizona, U.S.
- Occupation(s): Television producer and writer
- Years active: 1998–present

Peter Murrieta (born March 23, 1966) is an American television producer and writer.

He is best known for his work on the Disney Channel sitcom Wizards of Waverly Place, in which he served as head writer and executive producer during the first three seasons. He went on to win two Emmy Awards for his work on the series and Wizards of Waverly Place: The Movie. His most recent work is being an executive producer for the Cartoon Network live-action series, Level Up.

He has two sons named Joaquin Aaron Murrieta and Daniel Storms Murrieta and is residing in the Los Angeles County.

Murrieta's other television credits include All About the Andersons, Hope & Faith, Jesse and Greetings from Tucson, which he created.

In 2021, Murrieta, with author Jeffrey J. Mariotte, released the novel Blood and Gold: The Legend of Joaquin Murrieta about his ancestor and legendary outlaw Joaquin Murrieta. That same year he signed a first look deal with Universal Television, as well as a deal with Striker Entertainment to adapt his novel. The novel was ultimately adapted by Realm Media in 2022 as the podcast series Blood & Gold, adapted for audio by Greg Cox.

Murrieta currently works as a professor at Arizona State University.
