= Wizards of Waverly Place =

American fantasy teen sitcom (2007–2012)

- Genre: Teen sitcom; Fantasy
- Created by: Todd J. Greenwald
- Showrunners: Peter Murrieta (seasons 1–3); Vince Cheung and Ben Montanio (season 4); Todd J. Greenwald
- Starring: Selena Gomez; David Henrie; Jake T. Austin; Jennifer Stone; Maria Canals-Barrera; David DeLuise
- Opening theme: "Everything Is Not What It Seems" by Selena Gomez
- Composers: John Adair and Steve Hampson
- Country of origin: United States
- Original language: English
- No. of seasons: 4
- No. of episodes: 106 (list of episodes)

Production
- Executive producers: Todd J. Greenwald; Peter Murrieta; Vince Cheung; Ben Montanio
- Producer: Greg A. Hampson
- Cinematography: Rick F. Gunter
- Editors: Kris Trexler; Pam Marshall; Chris Poulos
- Camera setup: Multi-camera
- Running time: 22 minutes
- Production company: It's a Laugh Productions

Original release
- Network: Disney Channel
- Release: October 12, 2007 – January 6, 2012

Related
- Wizards Beyond Waverly Place

Wizards of Waverly Place is an American fantasy teen sitcom created by Todd J. Greenwald that aired on Disney Channel for four seasons between October 2007 and January 2012. The series centers on Alex Russo (Selena Gomez), a teenage wizard living on Waverly Place in the Greenwich Village section of New York City, who undertakes training alongside her brothers, Justin (David Henrie) and Max (Jake T. Austin), who are also equipped with magical abilities. The three siblings are trained knowing that one day they will compete to win sole custody of their family's powers. Episodes focus on Alex's challenges in keeping her secret powers hidden while she deals with the social and personal issues of her youth. She frequently uses magic in her everyday life, sometimes irresponsibly, and develops her supernatural abilities over the course of the series. The main themes depicted include family, friendship, and adolescence; the series also contains fantasy elements.

The Walt Disney Company developed the series to follow on from its successful line of comedy series in the 2000s, including Lizzie McGuire, The Suite Life of Zack & Cody and Hannah Montana. It's a Laugh Productions produced the program, and it premiered on Disney Channel on October 12, 2007. A made-for-television film adaptation, Wizards of Waverly Place: The Movie aired on the network in 2009 and was awarded a Primetime Emmy Award for Outstanding Children's Program in 2010. The series ended on January 6, 2012, to allow Gomez to take on more mature roles. Following its conclusion, the cast returned for a standalone television special, The Wizards Return: Alex vs. Alex, which aired in 2013. A sequel series, Wizards Beyond Waverly Place, in which Henrie and Gomez reprised their roles, aired from October 2024 to August 2026.

Wizards of Waverly Place enjoyed consistently high viewership in the United States on broadcast television and tie-ins included merchandise, a soundtrack album and video game adaptations. Television critics praised the show for its humor and cast; Gomez's affiliation with the network led to a prominent musical career apart from the program. Wizards of Waverly Place won two additional Emmys for Outstanding Children's Program in 2009 and 2012, as well as two Artios Awards from the Casting Society of America for Outstanding Achievement in Casting – Children's Series Programming – between 2009 and 2012. Its series finale was the most-watched final episode of any Disney Channel series.

== Premise ==
=== Story and characters ===
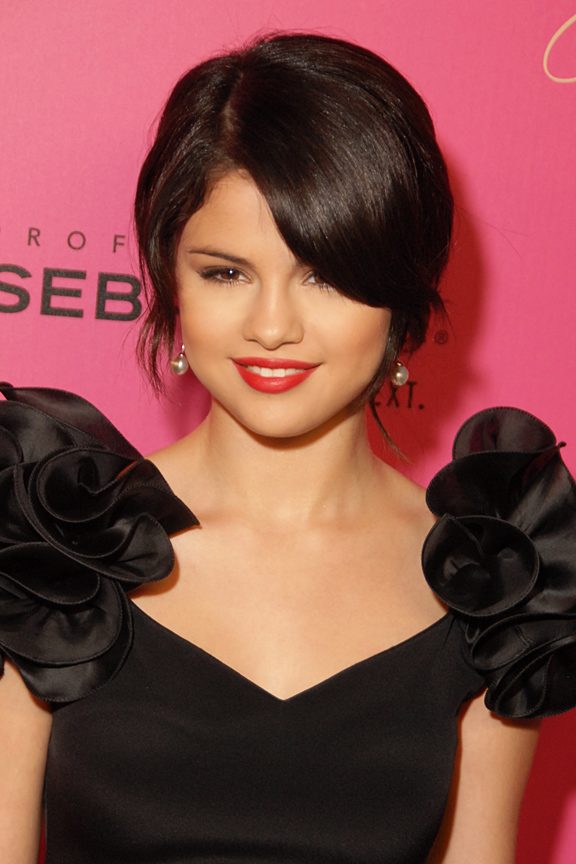
Selena Gomez, pictured in 2009, serves as the program's central focus during its four-season run.

Alex, Justin, and Max Russo are three teenage wizards-in-training living in an apartment on Waverly Place in Greenwich Village, Manhattan, New York City. In his spare time, their father Jerry Russo, a former wizard, provides his children with daily lessons in their secret lair on how to use magic responsibly. Jerry and his wife Theresa run a family business, a sandwich shop designed to look like a subway station, on the ground level of their apartment building. According to the rules of the "Wizard World", once they complete their training, the Russo children will compete to determine which sibling will retain their powers permanently and become the sole wizard of the family. Since the other children will eventually lose their powers, Jerry tries to teach them not to become dependent on magic. Jerry descends from a family of wizards and won his own family's competition as a teenager, but relinquished his powers when he married Theresa, who is a mortal. His powers were transferred to his younger brother Kelbo. Alex must keep her powers hidden from her best friend, Harper Finkle, which causes an occasional strain on their relationship. Alex reveals her secret to Harper in the second season; however, the existence of wizards must remain hidden to the wider mortal world.

In the third season Harper moves in with the Russo family, and Max's efforts to win the family wizard competition become more serious. Leading into the fourth and final season Alex and Justin are both tricked into exposing the existence of wizards to government officials and a group of reporters. It is revealed that the whole scenario was a test devised as part of their training, and consequently, Alex and Justin are demoted to lower positions in the family competition. Alex is overwhelmed by her loss of progress and quits; she later rejoins to continue dating her werewolf boyfriend, Mason Greyback. Meanwhile, Justin becomes a tutor for a group of delinquent wizards, which assists him in recovering his position in the competition. At the conclusion of the series, the siblings compete to see who will retain their supernatural abilities. Alex wins the family wizard competition and is awarded full magic powers, while Justin is allowed to retain his abilities when he assumes the role of headmaster at WizTech, a boarding school for young wizards-in-training. Max loses his powers but becomes the new manager of the family's sandwich shop, also securing investments from the wizard world.

=== Themes ===
The series deals with the theme of secret identities. It explores the fantasy that children may experience of wanting magical powers, in the same way Hannah Montana explores the fantasy of being a pop star. Series such as Sabrina the Teenage Witch and the Harry Potter franchise, and a trend towards the fantasy television genre, made stories about children with magical powers popular. Episodes of Wizards of Waverly Place typically show the Russo children using magic to solve an issue in their personal lives quickly, but they learn not to become dependent on their powers, as only one of the siblings is expected to retain them following the family competition. The children try to live normal lives; the show presents the idea that life can be enjoyable without magic. Conflicts in the series arise from Alex's struggle to balance both her private and her public life; her identity is built upon the magical powers which she must keep hidden. Scholar Colin Ackerman suggests that the concept of magic in the series is a form of social privilege and the Russo children are encouraged to keep their advantage hidden. He believed that the characters are influenced by consumer-driven values, for things which they are easily able to attain using magic.

The program's stories center on family, friends, and growing up. The Russo family is depicted as working class and they run a family business in the service industry. Jerry and Theresa teach their children the significance of family, hard work and responsibility; the characters regularly learn lessons such as the importance of staying true to oneself. Academic Heidi Denzel de Tirado argued that Alex understands the depth of family values only during the wizard competition, when she and Justin decide to set aside their personal success for the benefit of family. The series explores family heritage; the Russo family has a mixed background – Italian, Mexican, and American – but their culture is not prominently featured in most episodes, with occasional exceptions such as Alex's quinceañera. Scholar Morgan Genevieve Blue said Alex is designed to be representative of Latina-American girlhood.

== Production ==
=== Development ===
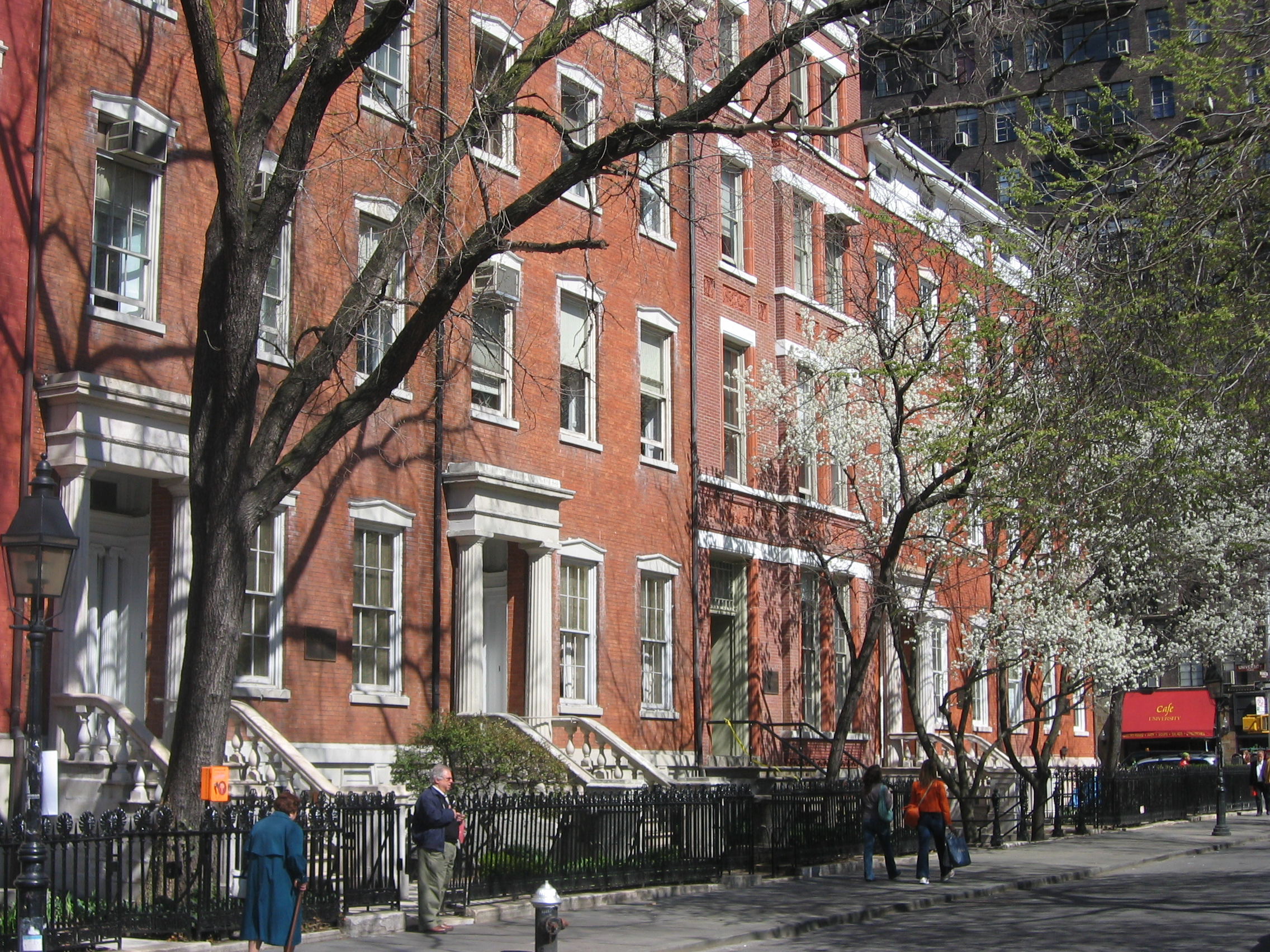
The series is set on Waverly Place in New York's Greenwich Village.

In the early 2000s, The Walt Disney Company found success through its pay television network Disney Channel with a pattern of original comedy series for a tween and family audience, such as Lizzie McGuire, The Suite Life of Zack & Cody and Hannah Montana. The network planned to build on these successes with a new comedy series aimed at girls. Wizards of Waverly Place was created by Todd J. Greenwald, who had previously worked on the first season of Hannah Montana. He had also worked on a pilot for NBC; Disney hired him after seeing it. Greenwald adopted the network's idea of a show centering on a family of wizards. The series is set in a fictionalized version of Waverly Place in Greenwich Village. Peter Murrieta had worked previously on the sitcom Hope & Faith in New York City and had moved to Los Angeles before being approached by Disney to help develop the series. When Murrieta joined the project as an executive producer, it was titled The Amazing O'Malleys; he thought they would produce only a pilot. He had never produced a show targeted at a youth audience and was apprehensive about being involved. Murrieta helped guide the writing and casting throughout the development process and re-wrote the pilot. Adam Bonnett, a Disney Channel programming executive, cited the influence of sitcoms Bewitched and I Dream of Jeannie on the series.

Disney executives first became aware of Selena Gomez at an open casting call in Texas at age twelve, (Note: It has been stated that the casting call was in Austin, as well as Dallas.) and she went on to appear in guest roles on Disney Channel programs, including The Suite Life of Zack & Cody. The network saw potential in Gomez and wanted her to star in a full series. She filmed two pilots for the network, Arwin! (a spin-off of The Suite Life of Zack & Cody) and Stevie Sanchez (a spin-off of Lizzie McGuire); neither of these series were green-lit, but Gomez was ultimately cast in Wizards of Waverly Place. The unaired pilot was set in a magic store and featured only two siblings, twins Jordan and Julia. (Note: Greenwald named the characters after his children, but altered these to avoid confusion with the series Just Jordan. He named the character Justin after his own middle name.) The show was green-lit after this pilot. Gomez was attached to the series by February 2007, as well as David Henrie and Jake T. Austin; the characters were named Brooke, Sully and Max O'Malley at this stage. In March 2007 the network officially announced Disney's Wizards as an upcoming comedy to premiere in the fall. At the time of the announcement, the characters were named Alexa, Aaron and Max Esposito. Greenwald and Murrieta served as executive producers; Murrieta changed the family's surname to Russo and wrote the children as "mixed-race". Gomez appeared in a guest role on Hannah Montana as cross-promotion for the new series; Wizards would eventually be aired in a timeslot after its peer series.

=== Casting ===
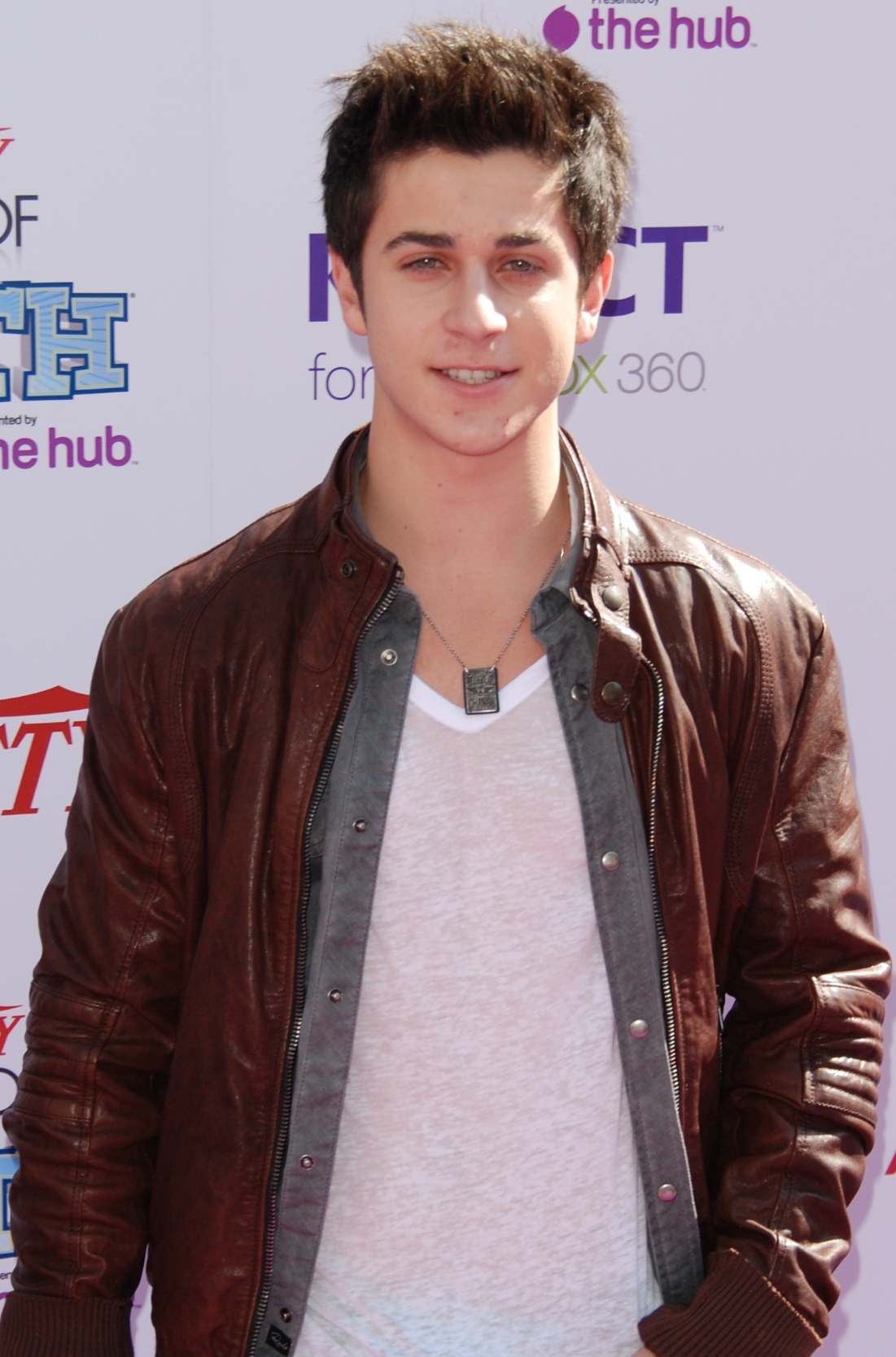
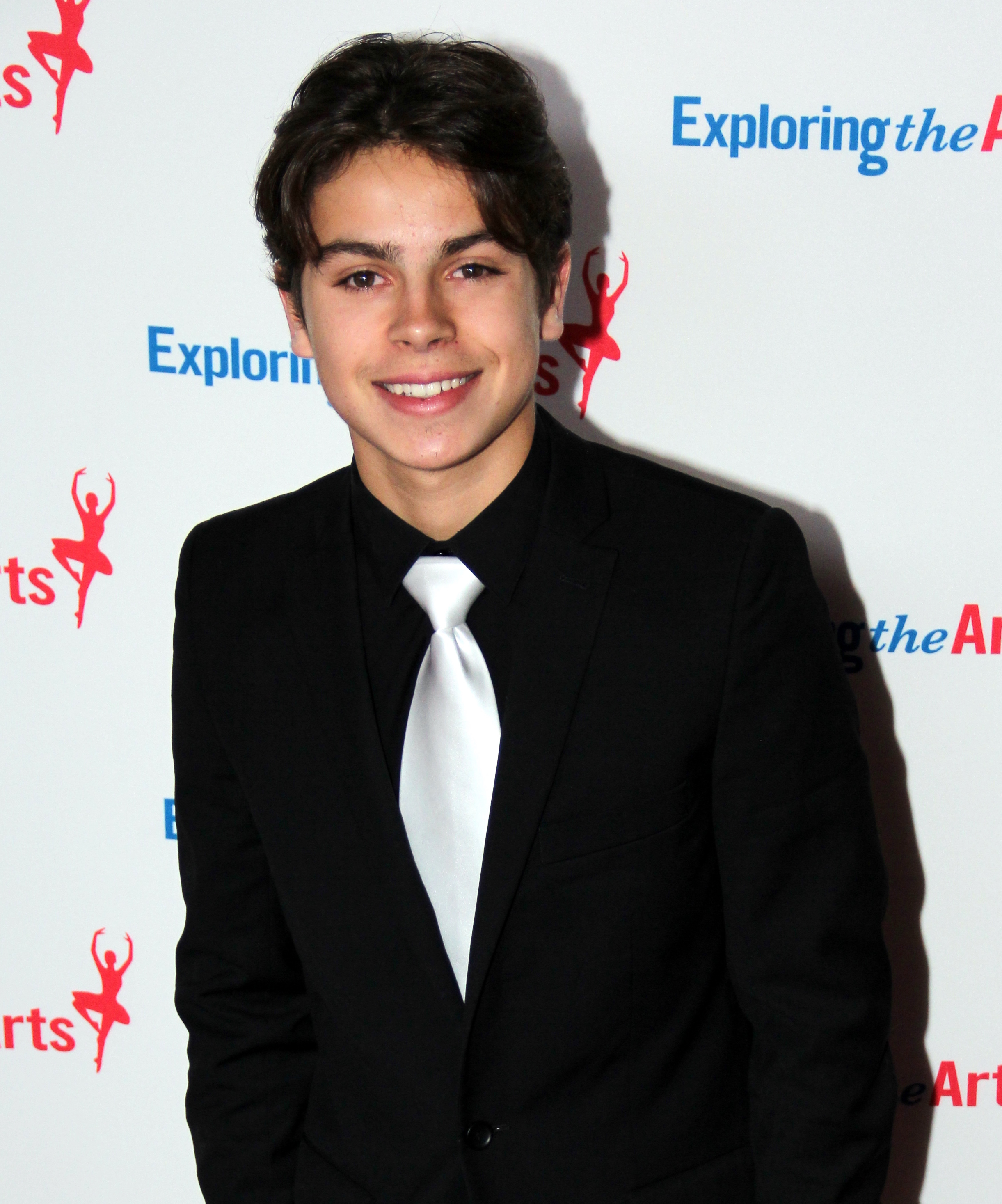
David Henrie (left, 2010) and Jake T. Austin (right, 2011) portrayed Alex Russo's brothers, Justin and Max, throughout the series.

Selena Gomez portrays the central character of Alex Russo. Gomez had left traditional school after the seventh grade and moved to Los Angeles. She sings the series' theme song, "Everything Is Not What It Seems". Alex has been described as dark, crass and a jerk, as well as a "wisecracking underachiever". She is characterized by her tomboyish, rebellious and lazy attitude. Gomez asked for her character to remain edgy to resemble her own style. Jennifer Aniston's portrayal of Rachel Green on Friends inspired Gomez, who adopted similar mannerisms while playing Alex.

David Henrie plays Justin Russo, who is considered to be sarcastic. Greenwald described Justin as a nerd, in comparison to Alex's "tough female character". Henrie wrote two episodes of the series, "Alex's Logo" and "Meet the Werewolves". Max Russo is portrayed by Jake T. Austin, who said the character was unintelligent, but becomes slightly smarter toward the end of the series. His character was temporarily transformed into a younger female in the fourth season because of a magic spell; Bailee Madison played the female counterpart, Maxine, while Austin took a hiatus from the program. Maria Canals-Barrera plays the children's mother Theresa Russo; David DeLuise plays their father Jerry Russo. The parents are described by Barry Garron of The Hollywood Reporter as loving but "slightly goofy". DeLuise and Austin were not featured in the unaired pilot. Jennifer Stone portrays Alex's best friend, Harper, who was described as "comic relief" by Boston.com's Joanna Weiss. Stone had previously auditioned for a Disney Channel pilot called Bus Life, which was not picked up. She originally planned to audition for the role of Alex on Wizards before being cast as Harper, and stated that she "fought" to become a series regular. Guest stars during the course of the series include Bridgit Mendler as Juliet van Heusen, Justin's vampire girlfriend, and Gregg Sulkin as Mason Greyback, Alex's werewolf boyfriend.

=== Writing and filming ===
Murrieta chose to write the Russo family as "mixed-race", and he felt that the argumentative relationships between the Russo siblings resembled those of his childhood. Greenwald believed that the brother–sister dynamic was at the heart of the show. Murrieta stated that it was the intention of the creative team for Alex to be openly bisexual, but they were unable to make it explicit at the time. He referred to the guest character Stevie, played by Hayley Kiyoko, as a potential female love interest for Alex. Wizards of Waverly Place was filmed at Hollywood Center Studios.

The series was renewed for a third season in May 2009, with eight episodes added to the order in September. Murrieta left the program at the conclusion of the third season in April 2010. He later claimed that he was not invited back as the showrunner for the fourth season due to creative differences. The fourth season of Wizards of Waverly Place was ordered in June 2010. Vince Cheung and Ben Montanio became the new showrunners and executive producers alongside Greenwald; Gomez announced in July that it would be the final season of the program. Austin claimed the series ended to allow Gomez to pursue more mature roles; The A.V. Club's Marah Eakin speculated that Gomez had become more popular than the show itself and it was time for her to move on. The series finale aired on January 6, 2012; the episode depicts the family's wizard competition.

== Series overview ==
Season	Episodes	Originally released	
Season	Episodes	First released	Last released
1	21	October 12, 2007	August 31, 2008
2	30	September 12, 2008	August 21, 2009
Film		August 28, 2009	
3	28	October 9, 2009	October 15, 2010
4	27	November 12, 2010	January 6, 2012
Special		March 15, 2013	

== Reception ==
=== Critical reception ===
Wizards of Waverly Place has received positive reviews for its actors and their comedic skills. Marah Eakin felt that it was a positive departure from Disney's typical series, with minimal slapstick humor but still having exaggerated acting. Gomez was praised for her comic timing and sarcastic delivery; the Los Angeles Times's Mary McNamara described her portrayal of Alex as "sweet and sassy". Additionally, McNamara believed that Justin and Max did not serve as comic relief; Jake T. Austin was called "absurdly hilarious" by blogger Mark Robinson. The central characters were described as "cute, precocious, but far from angelic" by Garron, who said child viewers would want to watch more. In addition to the cast and humor, the series' concept and themes were also praised. Critics suggested that the series capitalized on the success of the Harry Potter franchise, and it was also compared to Bewitched for the similarities in their magical elements. It was listed as one of Disney's best sitcoms by Robinson, who wrote that the series combined fantasy and comedy "seamlessly". While the fourth season was on air, Eakin said the quality of the series had not diminished, and has a lot of heart, depth and "actual feeling". McNamara praised the show for not relying on shtick or its laugh track.

Some characters were criticized by reviewers; Paul Asay of Christian website Plugged In did not view Alex as a positive role model because of her rebellious nature, and the parents were described as foolish by Weiss. Ackerman found fault with the show's contradictory messages, saying there are never consequences for the Russo children abusing their magical powers; he felt that the characters seem to forget the lessons they learn and continue to make the same mistakes. The lessons Jerry teaches about how to live life without magic were interpreted as pointless, as when the series ends, both Alex and Justin retain their abilities. The setting of Greenwich Village was also problematic for Ackerman, as he suggested that the Russos, a working-class family, would not be financially able to live in one of the most expensive New York neighborhoods. The show has been criticized for its predictable premise and supernatural elements, described as "less magical than milquetoast" by Weiss. Reviewing the series finale, Eakin criticized the quality of the wizards' robe costuming and the use of a laugh track. Critics have found fault with the program's special effects, such as the computer animation of a griffin. Asay referred to the program's depiction of angels as "spiritually misleading".

=== U.S. television ratings ===
Wizards of Waverly Place premiered on October 12, 2007, on the same night as the network's premiere of Twitches Too, and attracted 5.9 million viewers. The one-hour series finale, "Who Will Be the Family Wizard?", aired on January 6, 2012, and became the show's most-watched episode, with an audience of 9.8 million. It was the finale with the highest rating for any Disney Channel series.

Wizards of Waverly Place season viewership in the U.S. television market
Season	Episodes	Timeslot (ET)	Season premiere	Season finale	Average viewers (millions)
1	21	Friday 8:30pm	October 12, 2007	August 31, 2008	4.06 (Note: This data accounts for only nine of the 21 episodes of the first season.)
2	30	Friday 8:30pm	September 12, 2008	August 21, 2009	4.54 (Note: This data accounts for only 21 of the 30 episodes of the second season.)
3	28	Friday 8:00pm	October 9, 2009	October 15, 2010	3.94
4	27	Friday 8:00pm	November 12, 2010	January 6, 2012	3.87 (Note: This data accounts for only 25 of the 27 episodes of the fourth season.)

=== Accolades ===
Award	Year	Category	Recipient(s)	Result	Ref.
ALMA Awards	2008	Male Performance in a Comedy Television Series	Jake T. Austin	Nominated	
ALMA Awards	2008	Female Performance in a Comedy Television Series	Maria Canals-Barrera	Nominated	
ALMA Awards	2008	Female Performance in a Comedy Television Series	Selena Gomez	Nominated	
ALMA Awards	2009	Year in TV Comedy – Actor	Jake T. Austin	Nominated	
ALMA Awards	2009	Year in TV Comedy – Actress	Maria Canals-Barrera	Nominated	
ALMA Awards	2009	Year in TV Comedy – Actress	Selena Gomez	Won	
ALMA Awards	2009	Year Behind The Scenes – Special Achievement Honorees	Peter Murrieta	Nominated	
ALMA Awards	2011	Favorite TV Actress – Leading Role in a Comedy	Selena Gomez	Nominated	
ALMA Awards	2011	Favorite TV Actress – Supporting Role	Maria Canals-Barrera	Won	
ALMA Awards	2011	Favorite TV Series	Wizards of Waverly Place	Nominated	
Artios Awards	2008	Outstanding Achievement in Casting: Children's Television Series Programming	Ruth Lambert and Robert McGee	Nominated	
Artios Awards	2009	Outstanding Achievement in Casting: Children's Television Series Programming	Ruth Lambert and Robert McGee	Won	
Artios Awards	2010	Outstanding Achievement in Casting: Children's Television Series Programming	Ruth Lambert and Robert McGee	Nominated	
Artios Awards	2011	Outstanding Achievement in Casting: Children's Television Series Programming	Ruth Lambert and Robert McGee	Nominated	
Artios Awards	2012	Outstanding Achievement in Casting: Children's Television Series Programming	Ruth Lambert and Robert McGee	Won	
Artios Awards	2013	Outstanding Achievement in Casting: Children's Television Series Programming	Howard Meltzer	Nominated	
ASCAP Film & TV Music Awards	2008	Top Television Series	John Adair	Won	
ASCAP Film & TV Music Awards	2009	Top Television Series	John Adair	Won	
ASCAP Film & TV Music Awards	2010	Top Television Series	John Adair	Won	
ASCAP Film & TV Music Awards	2011	Top Television Series	John Adair	Won	
BMI Film & TV Awards	2008	BMI Cable Award	Ryan Elder, Bradley Hamilton, and Steve Hampton	Won	
BMI Film & TV Awards	2012	Cable Music Award	Ryan Elder, Bradley Hamilton, and Steve Hampton	Won	
Bravo Otto	2010	Super TV Star	Selena Gomez	Silver	
Bravo Otto	2011	Super Female TV Star	Selena Gomez	Gold	
Bravo Otto	2012	Super Female TV Star	Selena Gomez	Gold	
Bravo Otto	2013	Super Female TV Star	Selena Gomez	Gold	
British Academy Children's Awards	2010	BAFTA Kids' Vote: Television	Wizards of Waverly Place	Won	
Directors Guild of America Awards	2008	Outstanding Directorial Achievement in Children's Programs	Fred Savage (for "Crazy 10-Minute Sale")	Nominated	
Gracie Awards	2010	Outstanding Female Rising Star in a Comedy Series	Selena Gomez	Won	
Imagen Awards	2008	Best Actress – Television	Selena Gomez	Nominated	
Imagen Awards	2008	Best Supporting Actress – Television	Maria Canals-Barrera	Nominated	
Imagen Awards	2010	Best Actress – Television	Selena Gomez (for Wizards of Waverly Place: The Movie)	Nominated	
Imagen Awards	2010	Best Supporting Actress – Television	Maria Canals-Barrera (for Wizards of Waverly Place: The Movie)	Won	
Imagen Awards	2011	Best Young Actress – Television	Selena Gomez	Won	
Imagen Awards	2011	Best Supporting Actress – Television	Maria Canals-Barrera	Nominated	
Imagen Awards	2012	Best Young Actress – Television	Selena Gomez	Nominated	
Imagen Awards	2013	Best Actress – Television	Selena Gomez (for The Wizards Return: Alex vs. Alex)	Nominated	
Imagen Awards	2013	Best Children's Programming	The Wizards Return: Alex vs. Alex	Nominated	
MPSE Golden Reel Awards	2010	Best Sound Editing - Long Form Sound Effects and Foley in Television	Wizards of Waverly Place: The Movie	Nominated	
NAACP Image Awards	2009	Outstanding Performance in a Youth/Children's Program – Series or Special	Selena Gomez	Nominated	
NAACP Image Awards	2010	Outstanding Children's Program	Wizards of Waverly Place: The Movie	Nominated	
NAACP Image Awards	2010	Outstanding Performance in a Youth/Children's Program – Series or Special	Selena Gomez	Nominated	
NAACP Image Awards	2011	Outstanding Children's Program	Wizards of Waverly Place	Nominated	
NAACP Image Awards	2011	Outstanding Performance in a Youth/Children's Program – Series or Special	Selena Gomez	Nominated	
NAACP Image Awards	2012	Outstanding Writing in a Comedy Series	Vince Cheung and Ben Montanio (for "Wizards vs. Angels")	Nominated	
Nickelodeon Argentina Kids' Choice Awards	2011	Favorite International TV Show	Wizards of Waverly Place	Nominated	
Nickelodeon Australian Kids' Choice Awards	2009	Fave International TV Star	Selena Gomez	Nominated	
Nickelodeon Australian Kids' Choice Awards	2010	Fave TV Star	Selena Gomez	Won	
Nickelodeon Australian Kids' Choice Awards	2010	Fave TV Show	Wizards of Waverly Place	Nominated	
Nickelodeon Australian Kids' Choice Awards	2011	Fave TV Star	Selena Gomez	Won	
Nickelodeon Australian Kids' Choice Awards	2011	Fave TV Show	Wizards of Waverly Place	Won	
Nickelodeon Kids' Choice Awards	2009	Favorite TV Actress	Selena Gomez	Won	
Nickelodeon Kids' Choice Awards	2010	Favorite TV Show	Wizards of Waverly Place	Nominated	
Nickelodeon Kids' Choice Awards	2010	Favorite TV Actress	Selena Gomez	Won	
Nickelodeon Kids' Choice Awards	2011	Favorite TV Show	Wizards of Waverly Place	Nominated	
Nickelodeon Kids' Choice Awards	2011	Favorite TV Actress	Selena Gomez	Won	
Nickelodeon Kids' Choice Awards	2011	Funniest TV Sidekick	David Henrie	Nominated	
Nickelodeon Kids' Choice Awards	2012	Favorite TV Show	Wizards of Waverly Place	Nominated	
Nickelodeon Kids' Choice Awards	2012	Favorite TV Actress	Selena Gomez	Won	
Nickelodeon Kids' Choice Awards	2012	Funniest TV Sidekick	Jennifer Stone	Nominated	
Nickelodeon Kids' Choice Awards	2013	Favorite TV Show	Wizards of Waverly Place	Nominated	
Nickelodeon Kids' Choice Awards	2013	Favorite TV Actress	Selena Gomez	Won	
Nickelodeon Kids' Choice Awards	2013	Favorite TV Actor	Jake T. Austin	Nominated	
Nickelodeon Mexico Kids' Choice Awards	2010	Favorite International Female Character	Selena Gomez (Alex Russo)	Nominated	
Nickelodeon Mexico Kids' Choice Awards	2011	Favorite International TV Show	Wizards of Waverly Place	Nominated	
Primetime Emmy Awards	2009	Outstanding Children's Program	Peter Murrieta, Todd J. Greenwald, Vince Cheung and Ben Montanio, executive producers; Matt Goldman, co-executive producer; Greg A. Hampson, produced by	Won	
Primetime Emmy Awards	2010	Outstanding Children's Program	Peter Murrieta, executive producer; Kevin Lafferty, produced by (for Wizards of Waverly Place: The Movie)	Won	
Primetime Emmy Awards	2010	Outstanding Children's Program	Peter Murrieta, Todd J. Greenwald, Vince Cheung and Ben Montanio, executive producers; Perry Rein and Gigi McCreery, co-executive producers; Greg A. Hampson, produced by	Nominated	
Primetime Emmy Awards	2011	Outstanding Children's Program	Todd J. Greenwald, Vince Cheung and Ben Montanio, executive producers; Perry Rein and Gigi McCreery, co-executive producers; Richard Goodman, supervising producer; Greg A. Hampson, producer	Nominated	
Primetime Emmy Awards	2011	Outstanding Cinematography for a Multi-Camera Series	Rick Frank Gunter (for "Dancing with Angels")	Nominated	
Primetime Emmy Awards	2012	Outstanding Children's Program	Todd J. Greenwald, Vince Cheung and Ben Montanio, executive producers; Perry Rein and Gigi McCreery, co-executive producers; Richard Goodman, supervising producer; Greg A. Hampson, producer	Won	
Shanghai Television Festival	2010	Magnolia Award for Best Television Film or Miniseries	Wizards of Waverly Place: The Movie	Nominated	
Teen Choice Awards	2009	Choice TV: Sidekick	Jake T. Austin	Nominated	
Teen Choice Awards	2009	Choice Summer TV Star: Female	Selena Gomez (for Wizards of Waverly Place and Princess Protection Program)	Won	
Teen Choice Awards	2010	Choice TV Show: Comedy	Wizards of Waverly Place	Nominated	
Teen Choice Awards	2010	Choice TV Actress: Comedy	Selena Gomez	Won	
Teen Choice Awards	2011	Choice TV Show: Comedy	Wizards of Waverly Place	Nominated	
Teen Choice Awards	2011	Choice TV Actress: Comedy	Selena Gomez	Won	
Young Artist Awards	2008	Best Young Ensemble Performance in a TV Series	Selena Gomez, David Henrie, Jennifer Stone, and Jake T. Austin	Nominated	
Young Artist Awards	2009	Best Performance in a TV Series (Comedy or Drama) – Leading Young Actress	Selena Gomez	Nominated	
Young Artist Awards	2009	Best Performance in a TV Series (Comedy or Drama) – Leading Young Actor	Jake T. Austin	Nominated	
Young Artist Awards	2010	Best Performance in a TV Series (Comedy or Drama) – Leading Young Actor	Jake T. Austin	Nominated	
Young Artist Awards	2011	Best Performance in a TV Series – Guest Starring Young Actress 11–15	Bella Thorne	Nominated	
Young Artist Awards	2012	Best Performance in a TV Series – Recurring Young Actress 17–21	Bridgit Mendler	Nominated	
Young Artist Awards	2012	Best Performance in a TV Series – Guest Starring Young Actor 14–17	L.J. Benet	Nominated	

== Other media ==
=== Films and specials ===
Disney Channel asked the series executive team, including Murrieta and Greenwald, to adapt the series into a made-for-television film. Wizards of Waverly Place: The Movie aired on the network on August 28, 2009, and starred Gomez, Henrie, Austin, Stone, Canals-Barrera and DeLuise. It was filmed on location in San Juan, Puerto Rico, and depicts the Russo family on a Caribbean vacation. In the film, which was written by Dan Berendsen, Alex unintentionally performs a magic spell which alters history so that her parents have never met. The broadcast had 11.4 million viewers, (Note: The film was credited as the second most-viewed cable TV film broadcast of all time, behind High School Musical 2.) and won a Primetime Emmy Award in 2010 for Outstanding Children's Program. A second television film was ordered in June 2010, scheduled to enter production in 2011. In 2012, however, Austin said it had been canceled because of the maturing careers of the cast. Berendsen was to write the screenplay.

It was reported in September 2012 that an hour-long television special, The Wizards Return: Alex vs. Alex, would be produced for the network, with Gomez in an executive producer role alongside Cheung, Dan Cross and David Hoge. Gomez, Austin, Stone, Canals-Barrera, DeLuise and Sulkin returned for the special which began filming in October in Los Angeles. The special depicts the Russo family traveling to Tuscany, Italy, to meet with relatives, before Alex accidentally casts a spell which creates a good and evil version of herself. Cheung, Montanio and Berendsen wrote the screenplay, and Victor Gonzalez directed. The special premiered on March 15, 2013, watched by 5.9 million viewers.

=== Merchandising ===
Walt Disney Records released a soundtrack album for the series on August 4, 2009, including songs from, and inspired by, the series and film. Disney Interactive Studios released two video games based on the series for the Nintendo DS: Wizards of Waverly Place in August 2009, and Wizards of Waverly Place: Spellbound in November 2010.

=== Malaysian adaptation ===
A Malaysian adaptation of the series, Wizards of Warna Walk, was produced for Disney Channel in Southeast Asia in 2019. The series ran for 14 episodes and was filmed at Pinewood Studios in Johor, over two months. Set in Kuala Lumpur, the adaptation was designed to use local actors, music compositions, the Malaysian language and Asian values. Network executives considered adapting other series such as Hannah Montana, but ultimately found that Wizards resonated the best with test audiences. Wizards of Warna Walk was broadcast in Malaysia, Singapore, Indonesia, Thailand and the Philippines.

=== Rewatch podcast ===
It was teased in December 2022 that DeLuise and Stone would begin hosting a podcast entitled Wizards of Waverly Pod. The podcast premiered on February 6, 2023, through the podcast network PodCo owned by Christy Carlson Romano. Gomez was featured as a guest in an episode.

=== Sequel series ===
The possibility of a reunion series has been mentioned by several main cast members since 2017. Greenwald said in 2017 that he would like to see Wizards of Waverly Place continue with a high-budget feature film in the vein of Harry Potter. He also shared an idea for a prequel series which would follow Jerry as he attended WizTech in his high school years, and would feature his siblings. In August 2020, Henrie commented that all key actors were open to producing a revival of the series; he clarified that formal discussions with Disney had not yet occurred. Henrie suggested that the revival could revolve around a disconnected Russo family, several years later, who are all finding success separately but must learn to come together again.

Deadline Hollywood reported in January 2024 that Disney Branded Television had ordered a pilot for a sequel series, starring Henrie as a series regular and Gomez as a recurring guest star. The pilot, written by Jed Elinoff and Scott Thomas, revolves around a powerful young wizard named Billie, who comes to Justin Russo in seek of training and prompts him to resume his life as a wizard, after he had chosen to live a normal life with his wife and two sons. Under the working title of Wizards, the sequel received a full series order in March 2024. The official title was announced as Wizards Beyond Waverly Place in May 2024, and the series premiered on October 29, 2024. The series concluded on August 4, 2026; Stone and Sulkin made guest appearances in the final season.

== Bibliography ==
- Ackerman, Colin (2020). "Family, Hard Work and Magic". In Christopher E. Bell (ed.). Disney Channel Tween Programming: Essays on Shows from Lizzie McGuire to Andi Mack. McFarland & Company. pp. 75–90. ISBN 9781476639635. Archived from the original on August 27, 2022.
- Blue, Morgan Genevieve (2017). ""True Colors": Race, Ethnicity, and Class in That's So Raven, Hannah Montana, and Wizards of Waverly Place". Girlhood On Disney Channel: Branding, Celebrity, And Femininity. Routledge. pp. 63–87. ISBN 9780367874810. Archived from the original on August 27, 2022.
- Hodel, Christina H. (2017). Secret Superstars and Otherworldly Wizards: Gender Biased Hiding of Extraordinary Abilities in Girl-Powered Disney Channel Sitcoms from the 2000s (PDF) (Thesis). New York University. pp. 88–124. Archived (PDF) from the original on January 7, 2021.
