= Perry Rein and Gigi McCreery =

American writing and producing team

Perry M. Rein and Georgia "Gigi" McCreery are an American writing and producing team. They are best known for their work on the sitcoms Friends and Wizards of Waverly Place.

Their other television credits include Becker, Married to the Kellys, Nikki, Lab Rats, See Dad Run, Haters Back Off, and Knight Squad.

In 2012, the duo won a Primetime Emmy Award for their work on Wizards of Waverly Place, as a part of the producing and writing team. They served as showrunners for the Netflix series Haters Back Off.
