= Victor Gonzalez (director) =

American television director

- Occupation: Television director
- Years active: 1987–present

Victor Gonzalez is an American television director, known for his multi-camera work and focus on the Latino market.

He began his career as camera operator on the sitcom ALF. He continued to camera operate for many years on the sitcoms Roseanne, Married... with Children, Home Improvement, Reba and That's So Raven.

Gonzalez made his directorial debut in 2000 on the Telemundo sitcom Los Beltrán, and has since gone on to direct episodes of other series, such as Half & Half, George Lopez, Wizards of Waverly Place, Pair of Kings, I'm in the Band, A.N.T. Farm, Rules of Engagement, Lab Rats, Level Up, Kickin' It, Jessie, See Dad Run, Wendell & Vinnie, Instant Mom, The Thundermans, Bunk'd, Raven's Home, Mike & Molly, The Villains of Valley View, Pretty Freekin Scary, Last Man Standing and Man with a Plan. He has also directed The Wizards Return: Alex vs. Alex, a special episode that served as a follow up to Wizards of Waverly Place, as well as two episodes of the Netflix series Mr. Iglesias.

== Filmography ==
Year	Title	Role	Note(s)
1987–1989	ALF	Camera Operator	8 episodes
1989–1992	Roseanne	Camera Operator	72 episodes
1990	227	Camera Operator	Episode: "No Place Like Home"
1990	The Munsters Today	Camera Operator	2 episodes
1991	Davis Rules	Camera Operator	4 episodes
1993	A Different World	Camera Operator	Episode: "Great X-Pectations"
1993	Thea	Camera Operator	Episode: "Pilot"
1995	Married... with Children	Camera Operator	Episode: "And Bingo Was Her Game-O"
1995	Simon	Camera Operator	Episode: "Watch This"
1996	Home Improvement	Camera Operator	Episode: "The Longest Day"
1997–1998	Living Single	Associate Director	7 episodes
1998	Costello	Technical Coordinator	7 episodes
1999–2002	For Your Family	Technical Coordinator/Director	3 episodes
2000	Los Beltran	Director	4 episodes
2000	Viva Vegas!	Director	
2000	Rude Awakening	Associate Director	Episode: "Me, Myself and I"
2000	Spin City	Camera Operator	Episode: "Balloons over Broadway"
2002–2007	George Lopez	Technical Coordinator/Associate Director/Technical Director/Writer/Director	60 episodes
2002–2003	Reba	Camera Operator	5 episodes
2003–2005	That's So Raven	Camera Operator	25 episodes
2003–2004	Like Family	Associate Director	
2005–2006	Half & Half	Director	2 episodes
2006	Freddie	Associate Director	Episode: "Pilot"
2006	Four Kings	Technical Coordinator	3 episodes
2007–2012	Wizards of Waverly Place	Associate Director/Director	92 episodes
2008	Great Performances	Camera Operator	Episode: "Dance in America: San Francisco Ballet's Nutcracker"
2010–2012	Pair of Kings	Director	8 episodes
2011	Rules of Engagement	Director	Episode: "Beating the System"
2011	I'm in the Band	Director	5 episodes
2011–2013	A.N.T. Farm	Director	7 episodes
2012–2016	Lab Rats	Director	61 episodes
2012–2013	Level Up!	Director	4 episodes
2012	Kickin' It	Director	Episode: "Indiana Eddie"
2012–2014	Jessie	Director	5 episodes
2012–2014	See Dad Run	Director	5 episodes
2012–2013	Bucket & Skinner's Epic Adventures	Director	2 episodes
2013	The Wizards Return: Alex vs. Alex	Director	TV movie
2013	Wendell and Vinnie	Director	5 episodes
2013	The Thundermans	Director	Episode: "Dinner Party"
2013	Crash & Bernstein	Director	Episode: "Action Zero"
2013–2015	Instant Mom	Director	9 episodes
2013–2015	Dog with a Blog	Director	4 episodes
2014–2015	Mike & Molly	Director	6 episodes
2014	Friends with Better Lives	Director	Episode: "Yummy Mummy"
2014	Commando Crush	Director	TV movie
2014–2015	Nicky, Ricky, Dicky & Dawn	Director	4 episodes
2014–2021	Last Man Standing	Director	68 episodes
2014–2015	Cristela	Director	3 episodes
2014–2015	Liv and Maddie	Director	2 episodes
2015–2016	Best Friends Whenever	Director	6 episodes
2015–2023	Bunk'd	Director	5 episodes
2016	Dr. Ken	Director	2 episodes
2016	Lab Rats: Elite Force	Director	6 episodes
2016	The Odd Couple	Director	Episode: "A Dinner Engagement"
2017	One Day at a Time	Director	2 episodes
2017–2023	Raven's Home	Director	6 episodes
2017–2018	School of Rock	Director	3 episodes
2017–2018	9JKL	Director	5 episodes
2017–2018	Man with a Plan	Director	9 episodes
2018	Superior Donuts	Director	2 episodes
2018–2019	Alexa & Katie	Director	6 episodes
2018–2026	The Neighborhood	Director	45 episodes
2019	Fam	Director	5 episodes
2019–2020	Mr. Iglesias	Director	3 episodes
2020	Outmatched	Director	2 episodes
2020	Broke	Executive Producer/Director	9 episodes
2020	Game On: A Comedy Crossover Event	Director	Episode: "Mr. Iglesias: Olympic Effort"
2020	United We Fall	Director	Episode: "You're Doing It Wrong"
2021	Call Me Kat	Director	2 episodes
2022–2023	The Villains of Valley View	Director	11 episodes
2023–2025	The Upshaws	Director	5 episodes
2023	Pretty Freekin Scary	Director	2 episodes
2023	Frasier	Director	Episode: "The Fix Is In"
2024–2026	Wizards Beyond Waverly Place	Director	6 episodes
2024-2026	Happy's Place	Director	2 episodes
2025-2026	Shifting Gears	Director	8 episodes
2025	The Thundermans: Undercover	Director	2 episodes
