= Todd J. Greenwald =

American television producer and writer

- Born: Todd Justin Greenwald; New York City, U.S.
- Education: Emerson College
- Occupation: Television producer
- Years active: 1992–present
- Known for: Wizards of Waverly Place

Todd Justin Greenwald is an American television producer and writer. He is the creator and executive producer of the Emmy Award-winning Wizards of Waverly Place. Greenwald has also served as a producer and writer for Hannah Montana, California Dreams and City Guys.

== Education ==
Greenwald graduated from Emerson College in 1991.

== Filmography ==
- Wizards Beyond Waverly Place (2024–2026) (creator)
- Wizards of Waverly Place (2007–2012) (creator, writer, executive producer)
- Hannah Montana (2006–2007) (writer, executive producer)
- Family Affair (2002) (writer)
- According to Jim (2001–2002) (writer)
- City Guys (1999–2001) (writer, executive producer)
- Life with Roger (1996) (writer)
- Hang Time (1995) (supervising producer)
- Saved by the Bell: The New Class (1993–1995) (writer)
- California Dreams (1992) (producer)
