= Make-Up Artists & Hair Stylists Guild Awards 2024 =

2024 awards for make-up and hair in TV and film

- Date: February 15, 2025
- Site: Fairmont Century Plaza Hotel, Los Angeles, California
- Most nominations: Film: Beetlejuice Beetlejuice, The Substance and The Deliverance (3); Television: Dancing with the Stars (5)

The 17th Make-Up Artists & Hair Stylists Guild Awards, presented by L'Oréal Groupe and Giovanni Eco Chic Beauty, honored outstanding achievements for both make-up and hair stylists in motion pictures, television, commercials and live theater for 2024 on February 15, 2025, at Fairmont Century Plaza Hotel in Los Angeles.

Nominations were announced on December 10, 2024. Beetlejuice Beetlejuice, The Substance and The Deliverance, tied for the most nominations in the film categories, with three apiece. Other films with multiple nominations were Deadpool & Wolverine, Wicked, It Ends with Us and Gladiator II, with two each. In the television categories, Dancing with the Stars led the nominations with five, followed by Saturday Night Live and the 2024 MTV Video Music Awards, each with four.

The categories for live theatrical productions were merged and split into California Regional: Best Make-Up and Hair Styling, and Broadway and International: Best Make-Up and Hair Styling.

== Winners and nominees ==
The winners are listed first and in bold.

=== Feature-Length Motion Picture ===
Best Contemporary Make-Up	Best Contemporary Hair Styling
**The Substance – Stéphanie Guillon**; The Deliverance – Beverly Jo Pryor, Eric Pagdin, Chloe Sens, Doug Fairall; Emilia Pérez – Julia Floch Carbonel, Simon Livet; It Ends with Us – Sarah Graalman, Vivian Baker, Melanie Licata; Smile 2 – Sasha Grossman, Valerie Carney	**The Last Showgirl – Katy McClintock, Marc Boyle, Stephanie Hobgood**; The Deliverance – Melissa Forney, Linda Flowers, Tommie Ammons, Jackie Noel, Eric Matthews; It Ends with Us – Robert Lugo, Vita Viscuso, Anne Carroll; Megalopolis – Terrie Velazquez Owen, April Schuller, Tracy Moss, Victor Paz, Alexis Continenente; The Substance – Frédérique Arguello
Best Period and/or Character Make-Up	Best Period Hair Styling and/or Character Hair Styling
**Wicked – Frances Hannon, Alice Jones, Nuria Mbornio, Johanna Nielsen, Branka Vorkapic**; Beetlejuice Beetlejuice – Christine Blundell, Lesa Warrener, Charmaine Fuller, Mona Turnbull, Chloe Meddings; Deadpool & Wolverine – Bill Corso, Whitney James, Paula Price, Monica Huppert, Cyndi Reece-Thorne; Gladiator II – Jana Carboni, Charlie Hounslow, Maria Solberg Lepre, Lauren Baldwin, Chantal Busuttil; MaXXXine – Sarah Rubano, Mandy Artusato, Akiko Matsumoto	**Wicked – Frances Hannon, Sarah Nuth, Sim Camps, Gabor Kerekes**; Beetlejuice Beetlejuice – Christine Blundell, Lesa Warrener, Susan Cole, Charmaine Fuller, Chloe Meddings; Bob Marley: One Love – Carla Farmer, Nadia Stacey, Morris Roots; Gladiator II – Giuliano Mariano, Kerstin Weller, Romina Ronzani, Nicola Mariano, Marcelle Genovese; Shirley – Nakoya Yancey, Wayne Jolla Jr., Gayette Williams, Lisa Thomas
Best Special Make-Up Effects
**The Substance – Pierre-Olivier Persin**; A Different Man – Mike Marino, David Presto, Crystal Junado; Beetlejuice Beetlejuice – Jennifer Kewley, Megan Thomas, Martin Rezard; Deadpool & Wolverine – Bill Corso, Andrew Clement, Monica Huppert, Geoff Redknap, Robb Crafer; The Deliverance – Jason Collins, Chloe Sens, Michael McCarty

=== Television Series – Limited, Miniseries, or Movie for Television ===
Best Contemporary Make-Up	Best Contemporary Hair Styling
**Emily in Paris – Aurelie Payen, Carole Nicolas, Fred Marin, Sarah Damen, Josephine Bouchereau (Netflix)**; Abbott Elementary – Constance Foe, Jenn Bennett, Naima Jamal, Patrikk Johnson (ABC); Doctor Odyssey – Sabrina Wilson, Michael Ornalez, Rochelle Uribe, Tracey Anderson, Heather Galipo (ABC); Grotesquerie – Kate Biscoe, Tierra Richards, Naima Jamal, Victor Del Castillo (FX); Hacks – Debra Schrey, Erin Rosemann Good, Rachel Galey, Denise DellaValle, Keith Sayer (Max); The Penguin – Martha Melendez, Kim Collea, Maria Maio, Mia Bauman (HBO)	**Abbott Elementary – Moira Frazier, Dustin Osborne, Christina Joseph, Johnny Lomeli, LaLisa Turner (ABC)**; Emily in Paris – Carole Nicolas, Mike Desir, Julien Parizet, Remy Pilot, Miharu Oshima (Netflix); Grotesquerie – Valerie Jackson, Lauren Poole, Sharif Poston, Jason Green (FX); Hacks – Aubrey Marie, Jennifer Bell, Becca Weber, Portia Arikawe (Max); The Penguin – Brian Badie, Jenn Vasilopoulos, Mariko Miyagi, Bobby Diehl (HBO)
Best Period and/or Character Make-Up	Best Period and/or Character Hair Styling
**Palm Royale – Tricia Sawyer, Marissa Lafayette, Marie Del Prete, Simone Almekias-Siegl, Marja Webster (Apple TV+)**; Agatha All Along – Visilios Tanis, Erin LeBre, Tana Medina, Amanda Sprunger, Addison Foreman (Disney+); Bridgerton – Erika Okvist, Jessie Deol, Bethany Long (Netflix); Fallout – Michael Harvey, Kim Amacker, David Kalahiki, Mara Palumbo (Amazon Prime Video); Feud: Capote vs. The Swans – Jackie Risotto, Kristen Alimena, Christine Hooghuis, Kyra Panchenko, Emily Marroquin (FX)	**Bridgerton – Erika Okvist, Farida Ghwedar, Emma Rigby (Netflix)**; Feud: Capote vs. The Swans – Sean Flanigan, Chris Clark, Josh Gericke, Kevin Maybee (FX); Mary & George – Paul Gooch, Adam James Phillips, Julia Vernon (STARZ); My Lady Jane – Pippa Woods, Richard Muller, Hanna Lewis-Jones, Lucille Harding (Amazon Prime Video); Palm Royale – Karen Bartek, Brittany Madrigal, Frida Aradottir, Jill Crosby, Tiffany Bloom (Apple TV+)
Best Special Make-Up Effects
**The Penguin – Mike Marino, Michael Fontaine, Crystal Jurado, Diana Y. Choi, Claire Flewin (HBO)**; Evil – Joel Harlow, Jeremy Selenfriend (Paramount+); House of the Dragon – Waldo Mason, Emma Faulkes, Hannah Ecclestone, Heather McMullen (HBO); Interview with the Vampire – Tami Lane, Howard Berger, Polly McKay, Aneta Janíčková (AMC); The Lord of the Rings: The Rings of Power – Barrie Gower, Sarah Gower, Paul Spateri, Emma Faulks (Amazon Prime Video)

=== Television Special, One Hour or More Live Program Series ===
Best Contemporary Make-Up	Best Contemporary Hair Styling
**Saturday Night Live – Louie Zakarian, Amy Tagliamonti, Jason Milani, Young Bek, Daniela Zivcovic (NBC)**; Dancing with the Stars – Zena Green, Julie Socash, Angela Moos, Alison Gladieux, Glen Alen (ABC); Gaga Chromatica Ball – Sarah Tanno, Phuong Tran (Max); So You Think You Can Dance – Beth Pilgreen, Lauren Killip, Hannah Baxter, Jan Rooney, Desha Hayes (Fox); The Voice – Darcy Gilmore, Gina Ghiglieri, Kristene Bernard, Marylin Lee Spiegel, Kathleen Karridene (NBC)	**Dancing with the Stars – Joe Matke, Marion Rogers, Amber Nicholle Maher, Florence Witherspoon (ABC)**; American Idol – Dean Banowetz, Amber Maher, LaLisa Turner, Cory Rotenberg, Jerilynn Stephens (ABC); 2024 MTV Video Music Awards – Shawn Finch, Cory McCutcheon (MTV / Paramount+); The Upshaws – Cheryl Reid, Yvette Shelton, Brian Banks, Conrad Hilton (Netflix); The Voice – Jerilynn Stephens, Darbie Wieczorek, LaLisa Turner, Suzette Boozer, Bia Iftikhar (NBC)
Best Period and/or Character Make-Up	Best Period Hair Styling and/or Character Hair Styling
**Saturday Night Live – Louie Zakarian, Amy Tagliamonti, Jason Milani, Craig Lindberg, Rachel Pagani (NBC)**; Conan O'Brien Must Go – Louise Myler (Max); Dancing with the Stars – Julie A. Socash, Angela Moos, Donna Bard, Louis Harriman, Tyson Fountaine (ABC); 2024 MTV Video Music Awards – Angelique Velez, Kyle Krueger, Ruthie Weems, Francisco Cardenas (MTV / Paramount+)	**Saturday Night Live – Jodi Mancuso, Cara Hannah, Inga Thrasher, Joe Whitmeyer, Amanda Duffy Evans (NBC)**; Dancing with the Stars – Joe Matke, Marion Rogers, Amber Nicholle Maher, Florence Witherspoon (ABC); 2024 MTV Video Music Awards – Shawn Finch, Cory McCutcheon (MTV / Paramount+)
Best Special Make-Up Effects
**Saturday Night Live – Louie Zakarian, Jason Milani, Brandon Grether, Amy Tagliamonti, Tom Denier Jr. (NBC)**; Dancing with the Stars – Brian Sipe, James MacKinnon, Julie Socash (ABC); Night Court – Bruce Grayson, James MacKinnon, Kevin Wasner, Hugo Villasenor (NBC / Peacock)

=== Daytime Television ===
Best Make-Up	Best Hair Styling
**The Jennifer Hudson Show – Jen Fregozo, Adam Burrell (Fox)**; John Mulaney Presents: Everybody's in LA – Tonia Green, Jude Alcala, Tyson Fountaine (Netflix); The Kelly Clarkson Show – Gloria Elias-Foeillet, Monica Boyd Lester, Kim Weber, Louie Zakarian (NBC / Peacock); Last Week Tonight with John Oliver – Sarah Egan, Rachel Roberts (Max); The Young and the Restless – Stacey Browning, James Elle, Robert Bolger, Riley Nightingall, Amanda Goldstein (CBS / Paramount+)	**The Jennifer Hudson Show – Robear Landeros, Albert Morrison (Fox)**; The Bold and the Beautiful – Stephanie Paugh, Danielle Dubinsky, Karlye Buff, Alexis Reyes (CBS); The Drew Barrymore Show – Daniel Howell, Toni Coburn (CBS); The Kelly Clarkson Show – Corey Morris, Kerry Joly, Brittany Hartman, Adam Long (NBC / Peacock); The Young and the Restless – Lauren Mendoza, Justin Jackson, Michelle Corona, Diana Santana (CBS / Paramount+)

=== Children and Teen Television Programming ===
Best Make-Up	Best Hair Styling
**Danger Force – Michael Johnston, Brad Look, Kevin Westmore, Kim Perrodin, Kato DeStefan (Nickelodeon)**; Avatar: The Last Airbender – Rita Ciccozzi, Ceilidh Dunn, Debbie Lelievre, Alannah Bilodeau, Vicki Syskakis (Netflix); Percy Jackson and the Olympians – Naomi Bakstad, Megan Harkness, Krista Seller, Jonah Levy, Mike Fields (Disney+); The Really Loud House – Sheila Trujillo, Michael Solano, Lauren Weinstein, Jennifer McDaniel, Sierra Barton (Nickelodeon / Paramount+); Wizards Beyond Waverly Place – Melissa Sandora, Sarah Benjamin Hall, Koji Ohmura (Disney Channel)	**Avatar: The Last Airbender – Julie McHaffie, Dianne Holme, Codey Blair, Sandy Hall (Netflix)**; Bunk'd: Learning the Ropes – Janice Z. Allison, Cheryl Eckert, Jani Kleinbard (Disney Channel); Percy Jackson and the Olympians –Jeannie Chow, Jessica Glyn-Jones, Amanda Dawn Mitchell, Heather McLellan, Sam Wyatt (Disney+); The Really Loud House – Charles Yusko, Shelly D. D’Apolito, Elicia Vasquez, Drew Quentin Burrell, Alison Smith (Nickelodeon / Paramount+); The Thundermans Return – Amber Hamilton, Teresita Mariscal, Sophie Rose Gutterman, Laura Caponera (Nickelodeon); Wizards Beyond Waverly Place – Dwayne Ross, Tamara Tripp (Disney Channel)

=== Commercials and Music Videos ===
Best Make-Up	Best Hair Styling
**Secret – "Beetlejuice Beetlejuice: Lifesaver" – Scotia Boyd, Julie Hassett, Bianca Appice (E! / Bravo)**; Taylor Swift featuring Post Malone: "Fortnight" – Melissa Rogers, Levi Vieira (YouTube); OLIPOP Ridge Rush: "Alien" – Ally McGillicuddy, Bianca Appice, Dave Snyder (YouTube); Sabrina Carpenter: "Taste" – Chloe Sens, Lawrence Mercado, Josh Foster (YouTube); Daphne Guinness & David LaChapelle: "Time" – Valli O'Reilly, Kris Evans, Nick Fischer, Kabuki, Donald Mowat (YouTube)	**Secret – "Beetlejuice Beetlejuice: Lifesaver" – Pavy Olivarez, Taylor Tanaka-Suitt (E!/ Bravo)**; Doritos: "Dinamitas Super Bowl 2024" – Katy McClintock, Fernando Santaella Navarro; Homes.com: "Salon" – Dominie Till, Fernando Navarro, Miles Jeffries; Loewe: "Decades of Confusion" – Michelle Ceglia, Rob Pickens, Rheanne White, Madeline LeCuyer; Daphne Guinness & David LaChapelle: "Time" – Larry Dean, Dean McDaniel, Bonnie Subnick, Jessie McCollum (YouTube)

=== Theatrical Productions (Live Stage) ===
California Regional: Best Make-Up and Hair Styling	Broadway and International: Best Make-Up and Hair Styling
**Madame Butterfly (LA Opera) – Samantha Wiener, Maggie Clark, Brandi Strona, Nicole Rodrigues, Kelso Millett**; La Traviata (LA Opera) – Samantha Wiener, Danielle Richter, Brandi Strona, Jacki Nocerino, Nicole Rodrigues; Romeo and Juliet (LA Opera) – Samantha Wiener, Maggie Clark, Brandi Strona, Jacki Nocerino, Nathalie Eidt; Ruddigore or, The Bruja's Curse – Vanessa Blanchard Lee, Mwajuma “Naki” Mugambi, David Searle, Raegina Joyner; Turandot (LA Opera) – Samantha Wiener, Danielle Richter, Brandi Strona, Kelso Millett, Nathalie Eidt	**The Great Gatsby (Broadway) – Kevin Thomas Garcia, Christine Hutcheson, Michael Duschl, Britt Griffith**; & Juliet (Broadway) – J. Jared Janas, Anthony Lauro, Sara Donovan, Ni’Kia McDaniel; Cabaret (Broadway) – Jamie Amadio, Brian Strumwasser, Erick Miralles, Antoinette Massiah; Cabaret at the Kit Kat Club (London) – Sam Cox, Guy Common; Chicago – The Musical (Broadway) – Barry Ernst

=== Honorary Awards ===
- Vanguard Award – Research Council of Makeup Artists
- Distinguished Artisan Award – Allison Janney
- Lifetime Achievement Award – Todd McIntosh and Peter Tothpal
