= Wizards Beyond Waverly Place =

American fantasy comedy television series

- Genre: Comedy; Fantasy
- Created by: Todd J. Greenwald
- Based on: Wizards of Waverly Place by Todd J. Greenwald
- Developed by: Jed Elinoff & Scott Thomas
- Starring: Janice LeAnn Brown; Alkaio Thiele; Max Matenko; Taylor Cora; Mimi Gianopulos; David Henrie
- Theme music composer: John Adair; Steve Hampton; Ryan Elder; Brad Hamilton
- Opening theme: "Everything Is Not What It Seems" by Janice LeAnn Brown feat. Selena Gomez
- Composer: Zack Ryan
- Country of origin: United States
- Original language: English
- No. of seasons: 3
- No. of episodes: 35

Production
- Executive producers: Jed Elinoff & Scott Thomas; Selena Gomez; David Henrie; Gary Marsh; Jonas Agin; Rick Williams; Andy Fickman
- Producers: Greg A. Hampson; Stefen Maekawa
- Cinematography: Clifford Jones
- Editors: Paul Coneys; Anna Terebelo; Dave O'Brien
- Camera setup: Multi-camera
- Running time: 22–27 minutes
- Production companies: Entertainment Force; Potato Monkey Productions; It's a Laugh Productions (season 1); July Moon Productions (seasons 2–3); Novo Inspire (seasons 2–3); Kenwood TV Productions (seasons 2–3)

Original release
- Network: Disney Channel
- Release: October 29, 2024 – August 4, 2026

Related
- Wizards of Waverly Place (2007–2012)

Wizards Beyond Waverly Place is an American fantasy comedy television series developed by Jed Elinoff and Scott Thomas. A sequel to Wizards of Waverly Place, the series aired on Disney Channel from October 29, 2024, to August 4, 2026. It is based on characters created by Todd J. Greenwald and stars Janice LeAnn Brown, Alkaio Thiele, Max Matenko, Taylor Cora, Mimi Gianopulos, and David Henrie.

Elinoff and Thomas served as executive producers alongside Selena Gomez, Henrie, Gary Marsh, Jonas Agin, Rick Williams, and Andy Fickman.

== Premise ==
Fifteen years after the events of Wizards of Waverly Place, Justin Russo lives on Staten Island with his wife, Giada, and their two sons, Roman and Milo. Having given up magic, Justin's ordinary life changes when his sister, Alex, introduces him to Billie, a powerful young wizard in need of training. Justin agrees to mentor her.

In the second season, Roman and Milo also gain wizarding abilities and, alongside Billie, begin training for the Family Wizard Competition. Meanwhile, the family faces Nicodemus Penwulf, also known as Lord Morsus, a dark wizard and Billie's paternal grandfather. His son, Damien, was destined to fulfill a prophecy involving the opening of a rift to the world of dark magic, but betrayed him after falling in love with Alex. Morsus attempts to use Billie's immense power to open the rift, prompting Alex to sacrifice herself by jumping through it to seal it.

In the third season, Alex is trapped in the world of dark magic with Lord Morsus, while Billie searches for her father, Damien Penwulf, who is imprisoned in Wizcatraz, the most secure prison in the Wizard World.

== Cast and characters ==
=== Main ===
- Janice LeAnn Brown as Billie Russo-Penwulf, a young wizard whom Alex sends to live with Justin so he can train her. In the second-season finale, Billie is revealed to be Alex's daughter. To protect her from her paternal grandfather, Damien and Alex hid her at WizTech and erased all memory of her existence. Her memories are later restored through a magical locket kept by Alex.
- Alkaio Thiele as Roman Russo, Justin and Giada's older son, Milo's older brother, and Billie's cousin.
- Max Matenko as Milo Russo, Justin and Giada's younger son, Roman's younger brother, and Billie's cousin.
- Taylor Cora as Winter, Billie and Roman's best friend.
- Mimi Gianopulos as Giada Russo, Justin's mortal wife, Roman and Milo's mother, and Billie's aunt. She works as an investigative reporter for WOWP News.
- David Henrie as Justin Russo, Giada's husband, Roman and Milo's father, Billie's uncle, and the principal of Greenwald Middle School. He trains Billie and later Roman and Milo in magic.

=== Recurring ===
- Kirsten Vangsness as Minister Bigelow McFigglehorn (seasons 1 and 2), a member of the Wizard Tribunal who later comes under Lord Morsus's control.
- Patrick Bristow as Wizardpedia / Wiz M.D. (seasons 1 and 2), magical holographic sources of wizarding knowledge accessed through enchanted books in the Russo family's wizard lair.
- Eleanor Sweeney as Bella Bianchi (season 1; guest season 2), Justin's neighbor who frequently clashes with Milo.
- Ramon Reed as Silas Evilini (seasons 1 and 3), the son of Dr. Evilini and the main antagonist of the first season. He conceals his identity beneath a hooded robe until the season 1 finale.
- Tobias Jelinek as Lord Morsus / Nicodemus Penwulf (seasons 2 and 3), a masked wizard who seeks to harness Billie's powers and brainwashes McFigglehorn. He is later revealed to be Billie's paternal grandfather.
- Recker Eans as Quentin (season 2), an orc disguised as a human who is sent by Lord Morsus to capture Billie. Roman later sends him to the Nowhere Zone.

=== Guest ===
- Freya Skye as Piper (season 2), an oracle who receives visions and sketches images of the future.
- Harvey Guillén as Gossip Stone (season 2), a sentient bust with knowledge of Billie's parentage.
- Brandon Micheal Hall as Damien Penwulf (season 3), Billie's long-lost father, Nicodemus Penwulf's son, and Alex's husband. A former villain, he reformed after meeting Alex.

=== Alumni from Wizards of Waverly Place ===
- Selena Gomez as Alex Russo, Justin's younger sister, Roman and Milo's aunt, the Russo family wizard, and a member of the Wizard Tribunal. In the second-season finale, she is revealed to be Billie's mother. Alex sacrifices herself by tackling Nicodemus Penwulf through the rift. She is rescued in the third and final season.
- Maria Canals-Barrera as Theresa Russo (seasons 1 and 3), Justin and Alex's mother and Roman, Milo, and Billie's grandmother.
- David DeLuise as Jerry Russo (season 1), Justin and Alex's father and Roman, Milo, and Billie's grandfather.
- Bill Chott as Mr. Laritate (season 2), the retired principal of Tribeca Prep.
- Sean Whalen as Mantooth (season 2), a ghost who haunted Justin during his teenage years.
- Amanda Tepe as Monotone Woman (season 2), a character who held various jobs throughout the original series and currently works as a mall security guard.
- Gregg Sulkin as Mason Greyback (season 3), a deceased pureblood werewolf and Alex's former boyfriend.
- Jennifer Stone as Harper Finkle (season 3), Alex's best friend.

== Episodes ==
=== Series overview ===
Season	Episodes	Originally released	
Season	Episodes	First released	Last released
1	21	October 29, 2024	February 28, 2025
2	10	September 12, 2025	October 17, 2025
3	4	August 4, 2026	

=== Season 1 (2024–25) ===
No. overall	No. in season	Title	Directed by	Written by	Original release date	Prod. code	U.S. viewers (millions)
1	1	"Everything Is Not What It Seems"	Andy Fickman	Jed Elinoff & Scott Thomas	October 29, 2024	101	0.14
Fifteen years after Alex Russo became the family wizard, (Note: As seen in the Wizards of Waverly Place episode "Who Will Be the Family Wizard?") her brother Justin, now 34 and a non-practicing full wizard, lives a normal life on Staten Island with his wife Giada and their two mortal sons, Milo and Roman. Justin has given up magic after being fired from WizTech. Alex, now 33 and part of the Wizard Tribunal, arrives with a young wizard named Billie and asks Justin to train her. He initially refuses, but reconsiders after Billie conjures a "Floogie" monster, prompting Justin to help her defeat it. Without his family's knowledge, Justin resumes magic and agrees to mentor Billie. Justin, Billie, and Alex revisit the old family lair, where Alex reveals a prophecy: Billie is destined to prevent an impending global threat. Special guest star: Selena Gomez as Alex Russo Guest star: Dee Bradley Baker as Floogie Absent: Taylor Cora as Winter
2	2	"Mortal Vibes Only"	Jody Margolin Hahn	Jed Elinoff & Scott Thomas	October 29, 2024	102	0.12
Billie gets in trouble with Justin for using magic outside the lair and fears being kicked out. When she accidentally reveals Justin’s wizard identity to Milo and Roman, she tries to fix the situation by casting a slowing spell on them and brewing an erasing potion—but it backfires, erasing half of each boy’s body. In the chaos, Giada discovers the truth about magic. Feeling ashamed, Billie runs away, but Justin finds her at the Ghoulhound Bus Stop and apologizes, assuring her that making mistakes is part of growing up. He brings her back home. After they leave, a green ghostly figure—seeking to destroy Billie—appears. Guest stars: Patrick Bristow as Wizardpedia, Dee Bradley Baker as Phantomus Absent: Taylor Cora as Winter
3	3	"Saved by the Spell"	Andy Fickman	Jed Elinoff & Scott Thomas	October 30, 2024 (Note: This episode was first released on Disney+ on October 30, 2024.)	103	0.12
On her first day at Greenwald Middle School, Billie tries to impress Roman's best friend, Winter, using magic. Meanwhile, a magical talking frog warns Giada that a Phantomus is loose on Staten Island, prompting her to search for Justin. Jealous of Billie and Winter's growing friendship, Roman steals Billie's wand, leading the Phantomus to mistake him for a wizard and possess him. Billie reveals herself to protect Roman, drawing the Phantomus's attention. Giada and Justin arrive and urge Billie to use a restraining spell, which she successfully casts, trapping the Phantomus in Giada's purse. Billie later apologizes to Winter for using magic to impress her, and Winter forgives her. Guest stars: Oscar Montoya as Marcus, Dee Bradley Baker as Phantomus, John DiMaggio as Frog
4	4	"Something Wizard This Way Comes"	Bob Koherr	Molly Haldeman	October 30, 2024	104	0.10
On Halloween, Billie explains that in the wizarding world, houses without scary decorations risk being eaten by a monster called Pumpkin Belly. When their decorations vanish, Billie and Roman are swallowed by the creature and find Winter inside, who admits she stole the decorations to summon it. Billie uses soda and mints to make the monster vomit them out, but they must be re-eaten to retrieve Winter's forgotten phone. Meanwhile, Justin learns that students plan to egg his house since he's the acting principal.
5	5	"Wizards Just Wand to Have Fun"	Victor Gonzalez	Brittany Assaly & Danielle Calvert	November 8, 2024	105	0.16
Frustrated with Billie's irresponsible magic, Justin takes away her wand. To get him to loosen up, Billie decides to order a prank box from a wizarding store, but accidentally gets a shrink box. When Justin opens it at work, he is shrunk. Billie attempts to help with his virtual interview for the principal job, but it goes badly, and the superintendent ends up at the Russo home with Justin still miniature. Although he says Justin didn't get the job, Billie persuades him to give Justin another chance. Meanwhile, Roman uses a muscle suit to win at dodgeball. Guest star: Darien Sills-Evans as Superintendent Kowalski
6	6	"The Legend of Creepy Follows"	Andy Fickman	Rick Williams	November 8, 2024	106	0.11
Billie receives a tablet and joins Badgerbook, an online school program created by Justin to help students with their work—but it's mostly used for gaining followers. When Billie fails to attract any, she casts a spell to boost her popularity. Her followers begin to appear in real life, and she learns from Wizardpedia that unless the spell is undone, they will destroy her. Billie transfers the spell to Roman, putting him in danger, but she and Giada break the spell by destroying all the tablets. Meanwhile, Milo sneaks into the lair and teaches Wizardpedia how to have fun. Guest star: Patrick Bristow as Wizardpedia
7	7	"We're Gonna Need a Bigger Float"	Andy Fickman	Robin M. Henry	November 15, 2024	107	0.03
Billie has been delaying her wizard homework and is forbidden by Justin from attending the Fall Fest Parade until she finishes it. While reading her spellbook, she finds a card for the Spellp Line, a wizard helpline, and is transported there, where she meets Jerry Russo, Justin's father. She tricks him into giving her a completion spell to finish her homework. Meanwhile, Roman, leading the float decorating committee, bosses everyone away and struggles to finish the float alone. Billie uses the completion spell to complete it, and as the kids carry the float across town, it suddenly begins to float. Justin, grading Billie's quizzes, realizes she used the Spellp Line and reunites with Jerry, who advises him that every student learns differently. Roman grows tired of the floating float and asks Billie to help land it; she finds a dropping spell, which destroys the float upon landing. Roman apologizes to the committee and enlists their help to rebuild it. Billie admits she must take her homework seriously to become a great wizard. In the end, Roman's float wins against the rival school's. Special guest star: David DeLuise as Jerry Russo Absent: Taylor Cora as Winter
8	8	"You Can't Handle the Tooth"	Victor Gonzalez	Sandra Oyeneyin	November 15, 2024	111	0.03
Justin suffers from a painful wisdom toothache he's long neglected. While he naps, Billie uses a spell to remove his wisdom teeth, which relieves the pain but also strips him of his wisdom, causing him to act out of character. Meanwhile, Milo and Roman struggle to agree on how to design their clubhouse.
9	9	"Wiz-Taken Identity"	Lynda Tarryk	Jorge Thomson	November 22, 2024	108	0.13
Billie struggles with a spell, and Roman claims he could do it if he were a wizard. To prove him wrong, Billie uses an hourglass to transfer her powers to Roman for an hour, unaware that it's illegal to use it on mortals. A ministry member, Bigelow McFigglehorn, arrives to test Billie's abilities, and Roman impersonates her since McFigglehorn hasn't seen Billie's face. When another McFigglehorn appears, the first reveals herself as the evil wizard Morphia Murkshadow, sent to capture Billie. After Billie’s magic returns, she defeats Morphia, who is imprisoned. In prison, a hooded figure appears and sends Morphia through a portal to an unknown place. Meanwhile, Milo tries to win a pickleball tournament against Bella Bianchi with Giada's help. Guest stars: Kirsten Vangsness as Bigelow McFigglehorn, JJ Nolan as Morphia Murkshadow, Eleanor Sweeney as Bella Bianchi, Kristin Hensley as Anita Bianchi Absent: Taylor Cora as Winter
10	10	"Ain't Gnome Party Like a Wizard Party"	Raven-Symoné	Brett Maier	November 22, 2024	109	0.12
Billie's friend Nerissa from Wiz-Tech visits and says Billie has changed. To prove she's still "cool," Billie throws a house party and conjures a shadow-box—a nightmare trap no one lasts five minutes in. When Winter gets trapped inside, Billie rescues her and accepts her own changes. Meanwhile, Milo struggles to grow a sunflower, much to rival Bella's delight. A magical gnome grows it but intentionally switches bodies with Milo, forcing Justin and Giada to find a way to reverse the swap. During the party, Roman meets a pixie named Iggy and instantly develops a crush. Guest stars: Mykal-Michelle Harris as Nerissa, Eleanor Sweeney as Bella Bianchi, Sarrie Thompson as Iggy, John DiMaggio as Gnome
11	11	"Potions Eleven"	Danielle Fishel	Emily Orr & Ali Peikin	January 17, 2025	110	0.09
Billie is caught using magic to help Roman be good at sports, and Justin grounds them both. To prove that Justin must have used magic irresponsibly himself at some point, Billie conjures a potion to visit his mind and look through his memories. While talking to the school board about saving the STEM electives, Justin's body starts moving erratically causing his presentation to go wrong; it's revealed this is caused by Billie messing with buttons inside his mind. Going through Justin's memories, she discovers something amiss in his memory of 'The Unicorn Incident' that got him fired: it turns out Alistair Goodspeed framed him and wiped his memory. Restoring the memory summons Alistair to Justin's mind, but Billie is able to trap him in one of the DVD cases that store Justin's memories with Roman's help. Realizing he was framed, Justin accidentally causes an explosion; the school board decides to keep the STEM electives, reasoning that the whole debacle proved that science education is clearly still needed. Guest stars: Oscar Montoya as Marcus, Amir Talai as Alistair Goodspeed Absent: Max Matenko as Milo Russo
12	12	"Battle of the Wands"	Robbie Countryman	Brittany Assaly & Danielle Calvert	January 17, 2025	112	0.09
Billie wants to enter the Battle of the Wands, a competition for wizards, but Justin forbids her from doing so. She sneaks out with Winter and Roman, having Milo cover for them. Billie meets former Battle of the Wands champion Nigel Dragonberry and his son Xander, who tells her she will always be the screw-up who couldn't make it at WizTech. Milo blows the cover, and Justin goes to take the kids home. Once he realizes that everyone just calls him "Alex's brother" as stated by Nigel, he relents and agrees to help Billie take the Dragonberry's down. Justin and Billie win, but Billie gives the trophy to Xander after hearing Nigel call him a disappointment. Meanwhile, Winter helps Roman talk to his crush Iggy, who says she likes him too and gives him her number. Guest stars: Adam Chambers as Nigel Dragonberry, Sarrie Thompson as Iggy, Yuvi Hecht as Xander Dragonberry, Britt Chandler Johnson as Emcee, Austin Brady as The Hand
13	13	"There's Something About the Russos"	Leonard R. Garner Jr.	Molly Haldeman	January 24, 2025	113	0.09
Billie uses magic outside of the lair and is seen by their neighbor, Bella. When confronted, Milo manages to make up an excuse, but just as Bella's leaving, Billie exits the lair through a magic mirror. Milo pushes Bella through it in a panic, proceeding to break it. As the mirror can't be fixed from outside, they need another way in; Justin finds out there's still an entrance in the old freezer they had in their family's shop, which is now in a fancy restaurant. Justin and Billie manage to enter the restaurant's kitchen with the help of Winter, getting to the lair just in time to erase Bella's memory. Bella leaves, finding a glowing orb she took from the lair in her pocket, reviving her suspicions about the Russos. Guest star: Eleanor Sweeney as Bella Bianchi
14	14	"Ready Player Wand"	Danielle Fishel	Emily Orr & Ali Peikin	January 24, 2025	117	0.08
The Russos plan to get together for a family game night, something Roman is highly competitive at. Billie is determined to beat him, so she finds a wizard game in the lair he hasn't played before. As they're about to play, Roman runs away due to a spider on the board, but the whole family is sucked into the game as Milo throws dice onto it. Now inside a miniature version of their house, they need to solve a mystery by solving puzzles to get out. As they gather clues, everyone except Roman get trapped in the web of the now huge spider that was on the board earlier, but he manages to save them. They solve the mystery and agree spending time together ended up being a lot more fun than competing against each other. Guest stars: John DiMaggio as Technician, Ivy Perkins as Automated Voice
15	15	"Quest Birthday Ever!"	Bob Koherr	Brett Maier and Jorge Thomson	January 31, 2025	115	0.12
It's Billie's 13th birthday which, as a wizard, means she has to go on a quest as a rite of passage. Justin sets one up for her, but an unknown wizard sabotages it and replaces it with another, transporting Billie into a cave with multiple dangers. Roman and Milo, avoiding decorating for the party, end up in Billie's quest and help her find and claim the prize at the end, an amulet. Meanwhile, Justin and Giada try to set up the party, hiring a party planner who bonds with Giada. When they take the amulet, the cave collapses, but they're saved by Justin, who brings them to the party. Afterward, Billie is revealed to have secretly kept the amulet, which glows when she goes to sleep. Guest star: Miguel Pinzon as Martim
16	16	"While You Were Sleepcasting"	Robbie Countryman	Chloe Mathieu & Rick Williams	January 31, 2025	116	0.10
Billie and Winter plan a sleepover with Eva, an eighth grader. Billie is nervous as she wears headgear while sleeping as not to cast spells, and she's afraid Eva will make fun of her for it. To avoid sleeping, Billie makes a special tea, but Giada throws it away. She ends up falling asleep without her headgear on, making her sleep-cast. Meanwhile, Justin takes Roman and Milo for a 'boys night', taking them to things they used to enjoy when younger. Eventually, Justin admits he's struggling to adjust to them growing up, and takes them centaur tipping to make up for it. Once the boys get back, Justin sends Giada into Billie's dream to help Billie with her insecurities. Billie wakes up and opens up to Eva, who admits she was nervous for the sleepover too, showing Billie her own headgear and hugging her. Guest stars: Camila Rodriguez as Eva Morales, Kingslei Michelle Love as Lucy, Rory Keane as Centaur
17	17	"Abraca-Disaster!"	Jody Margolin Hahn	Aaron Mervis & Robin M. Henry	February 7, 2025	114	0.16
Winter has been practicing magic tricks for a month, but she's terrible at them. Not wanting to hurt her feelings, Billie uses magic to help her impress the President of their school's magic club, which gets Winter into both the club and that evening's show. Roman has started work for the school paper, and his friend is the photographer. He accidentally captures Billie using magic on camera, so Roman goes to great lengths to get hold of the camera so he can delete the photo. Billie uses her magic to help Winter during the show and Winter gets upset; she tells Billie that she should have just told her, rather than making her think she was good at something she wasn't. They both end up in a tank that's slowly filling with water, but Billie, not having her wand, can't use magic to get them out. Meanwhile, Milo wants to see a new horror film, 'Bucket of Guts 2', but when his parents tell him he's too young, he calls them uncool. This gets in their heads and they both separately take him to see the film, which he really wasn't ready for. Guest stars: Caroline Valencia as Sage, Jaeden White as Parker
18	18	"Hit Me With Your Best Bot"	Victor Gonzalez	Molly Haldeman and Brittany Assaly & Danielle Calvert	February 7, 2025	118	0.10
Winter and Roman have teamed up to build a robot for their school's 'Robot Rumble.' Billie tries to help them with magic, but they refuse. She teams up with Milo instead to make a huge magical robot named Boltron, commanding him to destroy the competition. Billie and Milo win the Robot Rumble, but Boltron takes the command too far and starts chasing Winter and Roman. Billie's magic doesn't work on him, due to the forcefield she added to the cauldron when making him. The four of them team up to build a robot that is able to defeat Boltron. Billie apologizes for using magic for everything, explaining that it was the way she was raised. Meanwhile, Justin goes to the wizard market with Giada to get some new serpent scale. Whilst there, he repeatedly accidentally offends a Cyclops, who then refuses to sell him the Serpent Scale. Giada applies some 'Fairy Lotion' to her skin, but it turns her into a troll for an hour. Since Trolls and Cyclopes are mortal enemies, Giada pretends to attack the Cyclops so Justin can play the hero and get the serpent scale. Guest stars: Deron J. Powell as Cyclops, John DiMaggio as Boltron
19	19	"Raiders of the Locked Archive"	Jody Margolin Hahn	Robin M. Henry and Rick Williams	February 14, 2025	119	0.11
Justin is being considered for a place on the Wizard Tribunal, so the family go along to support him. The amulet Billie got on her birthday quest is emitting a glow at certain things, so she, Roman, and Milo leave Giada and Justin to follow it. This leads them to the archive, where they find a painting with a prophecy about Billie written in Ancient Elfish. She casts a translator spell on it, but is unable to finish reading what it says before the guard catches them. Justin begins to make his case, when he realizes the children are missing and runs off to save them from the guard. Giada acts as a character witness, and persuades the committee to give Justin a place on the tribunal. Once the family gets home, Milo reveals he managed to get the plaque with the prophecy, which states that a powerful wizard girl will "end the world". Guest stars: Kirsten Vangsness as Bigelow McFigglehorn, Deron J. Powell as Cyclops, Matthew Willig as Archive Guard, John DiMaggio as Gnome, Rory Keane as Centaur Absent: Taylor Cora as Winter
20	20	"When You Wish Upon a Squonk"	Jody Margolin Hahn	Jed Elinoff & Scott Thomas	February 21, 2025	120	0.16
Justin's parents are in town to celebrate his new position on the tribunal. Theresa helps around the house, despite Giada claiming it's unnecessary. Billie, concerned about the prophecy, stops using magic. On Justin's first day, there is an alert for magic in Staten Island, which he lectures Billie for. The magic turns out to be Bella, using the orb she stole from the lair to summon a "Squonk" who grants wishes. Justin and Billie talk about the prophecy and she proves she hasn't been using magic. After discovering the Squonk was behind everything, Bella wishes him back into his orb, inadvertently wishing for her memory of him to be erased. Jerry and Theresa leave after revealing the orb is Jerry's. Billie hears Roman and Winter discussing the prophecy and their fears for her and leaves through a portal, which Roman follows her into. Justin and Giada realize they are missing, and Justin uses a spell to see where they went. Special guest stars: Maria Canals-Barrera as Theresa Russo, David DeLuise as Jerry Russo Guest stars: Kirsten Vangsness as Bigelow McFigglehorn, Eleanor Sweeney as Bella Bianchi, Ian Gary as Wishing Squonk
21	21	"Nigh Is Now!"	Andy Fickman	Jed Elinoff & Scott Thomas	February 28, 2025 (Note: This episode was first released on Disney+ on February 28, 2025.)	121	0.21
The family ponders where Billie and Roman may have gone. Alex appears shortly after, looking for Billie. After Alex finds out Billie is missing, she and Justin work together to locate the missing kids. Billie and Roman arrive at a fortress, where they're confronted by a man who identifies himself as Silas Evilini, the son of the villainous Dr. Evilini. (Note: Dr. Evilini was previously seen in the two-part Wizards of Waverly Place episode "Wizard School".) Silas reveals that Billie's amulet is imprisoning his mother following her actions in the original series. (Note: This backstory was the main plot in the two-part Wizards of Waverly Place episode "Wizard School".) Before Silas can use Billie to free her, Justin and Alex arrive and force him to retreat. They return home to find Giada and Milo held captive by Silas. Silas again attempts to use Billie's powers on the amulet, but is stopped when Roman and Milo block the spell, which causes them to gain wizard powers. They, along with Billie, imprison Silas in the amulet. Later, Minister McFigglehorn visits and explains that as there are now multiple wizards in the household, the competition to determine the Family Wizard must eventually take place; she also takes the amulet for safekeeping. However, as she turns away, her eyes glow red, seemingly controlled by an evil force. Special guest star: Selena Gomez as Alex Russo Guest stars: Kirsten Vangsness as Bigelow McFigglehorn, Ramon Reed as Silas Evilini

=== Season 2 (2025) ===
No. overall	No. in season	Title	Directed by	Written by	Original release date	Prod. code	U.S. viewers (millions)
22	1	"Curse Me Baby One More Time"	Andy Fickman	Jed Elinoff & Scott Thomas	September 12, 2025	201	0.12
McFigglehorn is revealed to be controlled by a being called Lord Morsus, who gives her an item to plant in the Russo house that will destroy their bond. Following the last season, Justin has begun training Milo and Roman in addition to Billie, and while Roman takes his training seriously and learns new spells quickly, Milo does not. Billie casts a spell to undo Roman's quick progression, but ends up turning him into a baby. Justin, worried about Milo, tells him to concentrate on his training, but when McFigglehorn arrives, Justin stops her from entering the house to avoid revealing the issues they're having. Billie, attempting to reverse the spell, turns Roman into an old man. Having Milo distract McFigglehorn, Justin and Billie both attempt to reverse the spell, turning Roman into an old baby, before Justin reverses everything. Roman forgives Billie, and Justin apologizes for being hard on Milo. McFigglehorn is revealed to have entered the house, and reports to Lord Morsus that she planted the item, which is shown glowing under Billie's bed. Guest stars: Kirsten Vangsness as Bigelow McFigglehorn, Tobias Jelinek as Lord Morsus
23	2	"Ooze!... I Did It Again"	Andy Fickman	Scott Taylor & Wesley Jermaine Johnson	September 12, 2025	202	0.10
Guest stars: Freya Skye as Piper, Patrick Bristow as Wiz M.D.
24	3	"Howdy with a Trance of Gumballs"	Jed Elinoff	Rick Williams	September 19, 2025	203	0.10
Guest stars: Freya Skye as Piper, Bill Chott as Mr. Laritate, Isaac Bae as Francis
25	4	"Don't Go Changeling My Heart"	Victor Gonzalez	Brittany Assaly & Danielle Calvert	September 26, 2025	204	0.10
Guest stars: Audrianna Lico as Karina Kowalski, Patrick Cox as Thorn Blazeheart
26	5	"Spells Like Halloween Spirit"	Scott Thomas	Molly Haldeman	October 3, 2025	205	0.06
When Justin refuses to allow Billie and Winter to do a haunted house on Halloween, Billie tries to find out why he hates the day. In a plot reminiscent of A Christmas Carol she brings him through the past, present and future of Halloween, finding out he has hated it due to being scared by Mantooth as a child. Their traveling through time causes Mantooth to take an interest in scaring Justin again, and he arrives at the house to do so. When he tries to scare Billie as well, Justin stands up to him, finally losing his dislike of Halloween, and he and Billie make up. Meanwhile, Roman and Milo begin a prank war, but Giada falls victim to their pranks and tricks them into shaving their heads. Guest star: Sean Whalen as Mantooth
27	6	"Cruel Detentions"	Jody Margolin Hahn	Sandra Oyeneyin	October 3, 2025	206	0.10
Guest stars: Kirsten Vangsness as Bigelow McFigglehorn, Recker Eans as Quentin Absent: Taylor Cora as Winter
28	7	"It's Beginning to Look a Lot Like Wizmas"	David Henrie	Chloe Mathieu	October 10, 2025 (Note: This episode was first released on Disney+ on October 8, 2025.)	207	0.14
Guest star: Amanda Tepe as Mall Security Guard
29	8	"Boogie and the Beast"	Robbie Countryman	Jai Joseph	October 10, 2025	208	0.10
Guest stars: Recker Eans as Quentin, Eleanor Sweeney as Bella Bianchi, Audrianna Lico as Karina Kowalski, Tobias Jelinek as Lord Morsus
30	9	"The Wizard at the End of the World: Part One"	Victor Gonzalez	Jed Elinoff & Scott Thomas	October 17, 2025	209	0.08
In light of Quentin working for Lord Morsus, Justin can't find any information on him and has cast a spell to prevent Billie from leaving the house. To get out after receiving a Messenger Fish carrying a message from Quentin, Billie tricks Milo into casting a spell that ends up flooding the house with gummy bears. While the Wizterminator works to remove the gummy bears, Justin takes the family to Alex's apartment as she is often never there. To their surprise, Alex is there, and she hears about what's happened. While Alex takes Justin and Giada to visit Bigalow McFigglehorn, Billie uses the Messenger Fish to track down Quentin. This leads her into a magical trap where she finds Lord Morsus' clothes on a bound Quentin. Justin, Giada, and Alex find out that Bigalow McFigglehorn is under Lord Morsus' control, and destroy the Amulet of Evilini to free her from the spell. Roman and Milo use tricks to defend their house and catch Justin in it, unaware that he's actually Lord Morsus in disguise. Special guest star: Selena Gomez as Alex Russo Guest stars: Kirsten Vangsness as Bigalow McFigglehorn, Recker Eans as Quentin, Tobias Jelinek as Lord Morsus, Britt Chandler Johnson as Messenger Fish
31	10	"The Wizard at the End of the World: Part Two"	Jed Elinoff	Scott Thomas	October 17, 2025	210	0.06
In the form of Justin, Lord Morsus manipulates Roman and Milo into helping look for Billie. Meanwhile, Billie officially learns that Quentin is an orc when his necklace breaks, revealing his true form. When Morsus, Roman, and Milo arrive, Roman casts a spell sending Quentin to the Nowhere Zone. Justin, Giada, and Alex go to The Gossip Stone to uncover Morsus' identity; his name "Torodos Morsus" is an anagram for "Doom To Russos". The Gossip Stone reveals a power hungry wizard named "Penwulf", but is silenced when a curse takes effect. Familiar with the name, Alex takes Justin and Giada to her apartment, discovering Billie, Roman and Milo missing. Alex finds a locket inside a box with the Penwulf crest, and Justin finds a button that brings him and Alex to Billie. Threatening the Russos, Morsus drops his disguise and reveals his lair is in their former sub shop; he also reveals that years ago he was close to fulfilling the prophecy, with his son having the power to open the rift, but betraying him for Alex. Discovering the painting with the prophecy, Morsus renewed his plan as Billie is a more powerful wizard. As Billie is coerced into opening the rift, Alex sheds a tear landing on and opening the locket, revealing her as Billie's mother. Alex had hid Billie at WizTech to protect her, before erasing all memories of Billie. With everyone's memories restored, Morsus realizes Billie is his granddaughter through his son. Milo gets a hold of a wand and frees himself, Roman, Alex and Justin. Alex and Billie embrace each other as mother and daughter as the rift opens. Alex gives Billie her locket, promising they will see each other again, before tackling Morsus through the rift. Billie is devastated, but embraced by Justin. The Russos return to their home on Staten Island, and Justin declares they will find Alex. The curse on The Gossip Stone lifts, revealing Morsus is Nicodemus Penwulf; his son Damien Penwulf used to be evil, but fell in love with Alex which led to them having Billie. Special guest star: Selena Gomez as Alex Russo Guest stars: Harvey Guillén as Gossip Stone, Kirsten Vangsness as Bigalow McFigglehorn, Recker Eans as Quentin, Tobias Jelinek as Lord Morsus Absent: Taylor Cora as Winter

=== Season 3 (2026) ===
No. overall	No. in season	Title	Directed by	Written by	Original release date	Prod. code	U.S. viewers (millions)
32	1	"The Rift That Keeps on Giving"	Selena Gomez	Jed Elinoff & Scott Thomas	August 4, 2026	301	0.19
Following Alex's disappearance, Billie has been having nightmares about hurting her family. When Roman and Milo express fear of her nightmares coming true, she destroys her wand to nullify her powers. Not knowing this, Roman, Milo and Winter try to hide Alex's things from her, and Roman finds a biker's jacket that transports him to a club. When Billie, Milo and Winter track him there, they discover the jacket belonged to her father, and Billie tries to get information about him. The bikers threaten them, not believing she is his daughter, but she proves her heritage by unconsciously performing magic when holding Winter's hand. The bikers let them go, giving them a teddy bear Billie's father left for her. At home, Billie repairs her wand, but still cannot consciously perform magic. When she goes to sleep, Winter is shown floating next to her bed. Meanwhile, Justin, unable to locate Alex, removes his emotions to create a device to find her, but it doesn't work and he gives up. After Giada tricks him into taking his emotions back, the device finds Alex due to their emotional bond. Alex wakes up in an apartment, and meets Harper, now her roommate. Special guest stars: Selena Gomez as Alex Russo, Jennifer Stone as Harper Finkle Guest stars: Tobias Jelinek as Lord Morsus / Nicodemus Penwulf, Blake Gibbons as Reaper
33	2	"The Right Stuffie"	Andy Fickman	Rick Williams	August 4, 2026	302	0.17
Harper and Justin behave strangely which turns out to be because they're expecting Mason Greyback, who has been dead for years, to propose to Alex. Mason's spirit reminds Alex of the truth and about her family, helping Alex to wake up. Billie's powers have ended up in Winter who clones herself every time she sneezes. Roman and Billie discover that the bear is a Blabber Bear which contains a message from Damien. By turning himself into a toy, Milo learns from the bear that Damien locked himself in Wizcatraz to keep Morsus from using him to open the rift. The kids release Silas to help them break Damien out, but he tries to escape before being recaptured by Justin. Billie admits the truth to Justin who restores her powers and joins Billie in breaking into Wizcatraz by placing themselves in the amulet and having Silas arrested. As Alex wakes up in another dimension, Justin's device is able to locate her. Special guest stars: Selena Gomez as Alex Russo, Jennifer Stone as Harper Finkle, Gregg Sulkin as Mason Greyback Guest stars: Ramon Reed as Silas Evilini, Matt Cordova as Chief Sentinel Killian Hogsby, Britt Chandler Johnson as Bear
34	3	"Billie Russo-Penwulf and the Prisoner of Wizcatraz"	Jody Margolin Hahn	Molly Haldeman	August 4, 2026	303	0.16
Justin and Bille sneak into Wizcatraz where Justin breaks into the records room and Billie tries to steal a set of keys. However, a Spell Scrambler keeps their magic from working and Billie is caught before being rescued by Justin after locating Damien's cell. Justin distracts the guards while Billie frees Damien. At the same time, Roman and Winter's experiments turn the microwave into a two-way communicator with Alex. Alex guides Roman through a spell to bring her and Justin together using their emotional bond, but Roman messes it up, transporting Justin to Alex instead of the other way around and leaving Billie and Damien trapped together in Wizcatraz. Guest stars: Brandon Micheal Hall as Damien Penwulf, Ramon Reed as Silas Evilini, Matt Cordova as Chief Sentinel Killian Hogsby
35	4	"The Last Spell"	Victor Gonzalez	Jed Elinoff & Scott Thomas	August 4, 2026	304	0.14
Silas reveals that they can escape when the Spell Scrambler resets, but betrays Billie and Damien to the guards. By threatening to smash the device, Billie is able to buy enough time to teleport herself and Damien out, leaving Silas trapped in Wizcatraz. Justin and Alex are reunited, but come under attack from Lord Morsus before Billie and Damien reopen the rift to bring them home. Alex's family is reunited for the first time in ten years and they depart for the wizard world. However, Morsus is able to escape and attacks the Russos and Theresa who came to help after becoming suspicious. Morsus rejects Billie's attempts to get him to change, but the family's love for each other creates a forcefield that reflects Morsus' attack, destroying him. Afterwards, the Russos celebrate at the sub station. Special guest stars: Selena Gomez as Alex Russo, Maria Canals-Barrera as Theresa Russo Guest stars: Brandon Micheal Hall as Damien Penwulf, Tobias Jelinek as Lord Morsus / Nicodemus Penwulf, Ramon Reed as Silas Evilini

== Production ==
=== Development ===
On January 18, 2024, it was announced that Disney had ordered a pilot for a sequel television series of Wizards of Waverly Place. Jed Elinoff and Scott Thomas, who developed Raven's Home, the sequel to That's So Raven, wrote the pilot episode. It was directed by Andy Fickman. Elinoff, Thomas, and Fickman executive produce the series alongside stars Selena Gomez and David Henrie, as well as Gary Marsh, a former television executive, and Jonas Agin. The pilot was filmed on February 1, 2024, with Gomez guest starring and reprising her role as Alex Russo. In the series, Henrie's character is set to have given up his wizard powers to live like a normal human. On March 22, 2024, it was announced that Disney Channel had ordered the pilot to series. Production began in Los Angeles in April 2024. Wizards was used as the working title during early filming until its official title, Wizards Beyond Waverly Place, was announced in May 2024. Raven-Symoné and Danielle Fishel directed episodes. Andy Fickman also directed additional episodes outside of the pilot. The first season consists of 21 episodes.

On March 31, 2025, the series was renewed for a second season. On April 2, 2026, it was renewed for a four-episode third and final season, with Gomez making her directorial debut with the premiere episode.

=== Casting ===
David Henrie reprises his role as Justin Russo, while Selena Gomez guest-stars as Alex Russo. Mimi Gianopulos was cast to portray Giada, Justin's wife, and Alkaio Thiele plays their elder son Roman. Additionally, Janice LeAnn Brown stars as Billie, a young wizard seeking Justin's assistance in wizard training. At the time it was ordered to series, it was reported that Max Matenko was cast as Milo, Justin's younger son. Taylor Cora also appears as Winter, Billie and Roman's best friend. It was later announced that David DeLuise would reprise his role as Justin and Alex's father Jerry. In April 2026, it was reported that Gregg Sulkin and Jennifer Stone were set to guest star, reprising their roles as Mason Greyback and Harper Finkle for the final season, respectively.

== Release ==
The trailer for Wizards Beyond Waverly Place amassed 69 million viewers in 10 days across all social media platforms. It became Disney Channel's most-watched trailer for a comedy series of all time. The series premiered on October 29, 2024, on Disney Channel. The first nine episodes became available to stream on Disney+ the following day, with episodes 3–9 being released prior to their televised premieres. Episodes 10–21 were released on Disney+ on February 28, 2025, with episode 21 being released prior to its televised premiere. The second season premiered on September 12, 2025, on Disney Channel, with two episodes. All episodes of the second season were released on Disney+ in the U.S. and select international markets on October 8, with episodes 7–10 being released prior to their televised premieres. The third and final season premiered on August 4, 2026, on Disney Channel and the following day on Disney+.

== Reception ==
=== Critical response ===
The review aggregator website Rotten Tomatoes reported an 89% approval rating with an average rating of 7.7/10, based on 9 critic reviews. Metacritic, which uses a weighted average, assigned a score of 78 out of 100 based on 4 critics, indicating "generally favorable reviews".

Aramide Tinubu of Variety said Wizards Beyond Waverly Place successfully blends nostalgia with fresh content. She praised the performances of both returning cast members like David Henrie and Selena Gomez, and newcomers such as Janice LeAnn Brown, Alkaio Thiele, and Max Matenko. Tinubu found the enhanced special effects and comedic timing of the child actors particularly impressive. She stated that the series retains the charm of the original, with its focus on family and magic, while introducing new adventures. She appreciated the show's lively and fun atmosphere, saying it appeals to both longtime fans and newcomers. Joel Keller of Decider noted that Wizards Beyond Waverly Place captures the silliness and family vibe of the original show, but observed a difference in Selena Gomez's performance. He praised her more subtle comedic timing, saying it may be influenced by her work on Only Murders in the Building, contrasting with the more exaggerated sitcom-like acting from the rest of the cast. Keller appreciated her nuanced portrayal of Alex Russo, balancing the childlike antics around her. He also highlighted the show's focus on Billie's integration into the mortal world and the return of original cast members, expecting the series to appeal to both nostalgic fans and new younger audiences.

Abigail Stevens of Screen Rant found Wizards Beyond Waverly Place to be a funny and heartwarming sequel that successfully captures the essence of its predecessor. She praised David Henrie and Selena Gomez for reprising their roles, noting their strong dynamic, while complimenting the performances of the new cast members. Stevens appreciated how the show mirrors the original family structure without feeling like a direct copy, maintaining unique characterizations. She stated that the series introduces darker emotional storylines, hinting at deeper themes of family and self-worth. Ashley Moulton of Common Sense Media rated Wizards Beyond Waverly Place four out of five stars. She complimented the show's comedic tone and found the moderate scariness of the wizards' encounters with monsters to be lighthearted and not overly alarming. Moulton appreciated the positive messages about perseverance and self-belief, while noting that the main character Billie is a complex role model, showing both rebelliousness and personal growth. She also found Justin Russo to be a good role model, while the relationship between brothers Milo and Roman was seen as affectionate despite typical sibling rivalry.

==== Finale controversy ====
Following the announcement of the show's final season only lasting four episodes, original and revival series creator Todd J. Greenwald expressed disappointment with the final season's length on Substack, calling it "a shame the writers with nothing but Disney experience reduced it to the lowest common denominator." After the finale, he jokingly wrote that he would "undo the entire Beyond canon in one simple chapter. By simply ignoring it. 'It was all Max’s dreammmmm.' Fixed. Moving on." In a later post, he rebuked the choice to kill off Mason Greyback, claiming that "Mason isn’t dead. You can’t kill our characters."

Jake T. Austin, who portrayed the youngest Russo sibling Max in the original show, posted to Instagram Stories after the finale to express disappointment in his exclusion from the reboot. Henrie would respond to this claim, stating that Austin was invited back multiple times and never responded. Austin posted a second Story to clarify that although Disney had confirmed his return in 2020 for a continuation of the original series, he was left unaware of Henrie's reboot until it was announced in 2024. He further explained that his exclusion from the show's first season and premiere event despite the presence of all other Russo family members, as well as his opinion on the show's quality, contributed to him ignoring any future requests. The Waverly Sub Station, the family restaurant now canonically operated by Max, was used as the setting for the show's final scene without Austin's involvement. David DeLuise, who had appeared twice in the reboot but did not return for its finale, wrote in an Instagram comment that the show "would not be over if the OG wizards were really there," calling it a "missed opportunity."

Zeke Beakerman, Justin's best friend from the original series, was also excluded due to actor Dan Benson's new career as a pornographic content creator. Although Benson did not criticize Henrie for this decision, Henrie's public-facing animosity towards Benson, as well as his blocking of Benson on social media, had already led to brief media controversy. Benson had been a long-time critic of the show and its direction on social media; following the finale, Benson wrote that the reboot "turned into the failed David Henrie show."

=== Ratings ===
Wizards Beyond Waverly Place debuted with 3.2 million views globally in its first 12 days on Disney+, making it the most-watched series premiere on the platform for Disney Channel. The show ranked as the top streaming series in the U.S. among Kids 6–11, Girls 6–11, Teens, and Adults 18—24 during its first five days. The release of the full first episode on YouTube attracted 1.1 million views, marking the channel's best performance for a new full episode since 2017. Social media activity generated over 125 million impressions and 13 million engagements on platforms including Instagram, TikTok, and Facebook.

Viewership and ratings per season of Wizards Beyond Waverly Place
Season	Episodes	First aired		Last aired		Avg. viewers (millions)
Season	Episodes	Date	Viewers (millions)	Date	Viewers (millions)	Avg. viewers (millions)
1	21	October 29, 2024	0.14	February 28, 2025	0.21	0.12

=== Accolades ===
Award	Date of ceremony	Category	Recipient(s)	Result	Ref.
Art Directors Guild Awards	February 15, 2025	Excellence in Production Design for a Multi-Camera Series	Kelly Hogan (for "Saved by the Spell" and "Something Wizard This Way Comes")	Nominated	
Art Directors Guild Awards	February 28, 2026	Excellence in Production Design for a Multi-Camera Series	Kelly Hogan (for "The Wizard at the End of the World Part II")	Nominated	
Artios Awards	February 25, 2026	Live Action Children & Family Series	Alexis Frank Koczara, Christine Smith Shevchenko, Gianna Butler	Nominated	
Artios Awards	February 18, 2027	Live Action Children & Family Series	Alexis Koczara, Christine Shevchenko, Gianna Butler	Pending	
Children's and Family Emmy Awards	March 1–2, 2026	Outstanding Cinematography and Technical Arts for a Multiple Camera Live Action Program	Clifford Jones (for "Nigh Is Now!")	Nominated	
Children's and Family Emmy Awards	March 1–2, 2026	Outstanding Art Direction / Set Decoration / Scenic Design	Glenda Rovello, Arthur Chadwick, and Amy Feldman (for "Everything Is Not What It Seems")	Nominated	
Imagen Awards	August 22, 2025	Best Young Actor	Taylor Cora	Nominated	
Imagen Awards	August 21, 2026	Best Director	Victor Gonzalez	Nominated	
Imagen Awards	August 21, 2026	Best Youth Programming	Wizards Beyond Waverly Place	Nominated	
MacGuffin Awards	September 13, 2025	Half-Hour Multi-Camera Television Series	Lindsay Tomlinson Forrest	Won	
MacGuffin Awards	September 12, 2026	Half-Hour Multi-Camera Television Series	Lindsay Tomlinson Forrest	Nominated	
Make-Up Artists and Hair Stylists Guild	February 15, 2025	Best Makeup in Children and Teen Programming	Melissa Sandora, Sarah Benjamin Hall, Koji Ohmura	Nominated	
Make-Up Artists and Hair Stylists Guild	February 15, 2025	Best Hair Styling in Children and Teen Programming	Dwayne Ross, Tamara Tripp	Nominated	
Make-Up Artists and Hair Stylists Guild	February 14, 2026	Best Makeup in Children and Teen Programming	Melissa Sandora, Sarah Benjamin-Hall, Koji Ohmura	Nominated	
Make-Up Artists and Hair Stylists Guild	February 14, 2026	Best Hair Styling in Children and Teen Programming	Dwayne Ross, Tamara Tripp	Nominated	
Nickelodeon Kids' Choice Awards	June 21, 2025	Favorite TV Show	Wizards Beyond Waverly Place	Nominated	
Nickelodeon Kids' Choice Awards	June 21, 2025	Favorite Male TV Star – Kids Show	David Henrie	Nominated	
Nickelodeon Kids' Choice Awards	June 21, 2025	Favorite Female TV Star – Kids Show	Janice LeAnn Brown	Nominated	
Nickelodeon Kids' Choice Awards	November 14, 2026	Favorite TV Show	Wizards Beyond Waverly Place	Nominated	
Nickelodeon Kids' Choice Awards	November 14, 2026	Favorite Male TV Star – Kids Show	David Henrie	Nominated	
Nickelodeon Kids' Choice Awards	November 14, 2026	Favorite Male TV Star – Kids Show	Alkaio Thiele	Nominated	
Nickelodeon Kids' Choice Awards	November 14, 2026	Favorite Female TV Star – Kids Show	Janice LeAnn Brown	Nominated	
Set Decorators Society of America Awards	August 9, 2026	Best Achievement in Decor/Design of a Half-Hour Multi-Camera Series	Emily Dawson-Trent, Roya Parivar, Kelly Hogan	Nominated	
TCA Awards	August 20, 2025	Outstanding Achievement in Family Programming	Wizards Beyond Waverly Place	Nominated	
TCA Awards	August 20, 2026	Outstanding Achievement in Family Programming	Wizards Beyond Waverly Place	Nominated	

== In other media ==
On August 12, 2025, it was announced that Janice LeAnn Brown would reprise her role as Billie in the Disney Channel series Vampirina: Teenage Vampire in a crossover episode titled "First Heartbeat," which premiered on October 24, 2025.
