= List of Wizards of Waverly Place characters =

The Wizards of Waverly Place cast of season two. (Left to right) David Henrie as Justin Russo, Jake T. Austin as Max Russo, Jennifer Stone as Harper Finkle, Selena Gomez as Alex Russo, David DeLuise as Jerry Russo and Maria Canals-Barrera as Theresa Russo.

The Disney Channel original series Wizards of Waverly Place was created by Todd J. Greenwald. The series first aired on October 12, 2007, and ended on January 6, 2012.

The series centers on the fictional characters of the Russo family, which includes Alex (Selena Gomez), her older brother Justin (David Henrie), and their younger brother Max (Jake T. Austin). The three Russo siblings are wizards in training and live with their Italian-American father, Jerry (David DeLuise), a former wizard, and their Mexican-American mother, Theresa (Maria Canals-Barrera), who is a mortal.

The siblings have to keep their magical powers secret while living in the mortal world. When they complete their wizard training, the three siblings have to compete in the wizard competition to decide who will become the next family wizard and keep their powers.

A sequel series, Wizards Beyond Waverly Place, began airing October 29, 2024. The series follows middle school principal Justin living with his wife Giada (Mimi Gianopulos), and their sons Roman (Alkaio Thiele) and Milo (Max Matenko), while he teaches magic to the young wizard Billie (Janice LeAnn Brown), who also attends Greenwald Middle School with Roman and their friend Winter (Taylor Cora).

== Overview ==
| Character | Portrayed by | Wizards of Waverly Place | | | | | Alex vs. Alex | Wizards Beyond | | |
| Character | Portrayed by | Season 1 | Season 2 | The Movie | Season 3 | Season 4 | Alex vs. Alex | Season 1 | Season 2 | Season 3 |
|---|---|---|---|---|---|---|---|---|---|---|
| Alex Russo | Selena Gomez | Main | Main | Main | Main | Main | Main | Guest | Guest | Recurring |
| Justin Russo | David Henrie | Main | Main | Main | Main | Main | | Main | Main | Main |
| Max Russo | Jake T. Austin | Main | Main | Main | Main | Main | Main | | | |
| Harper Finkle | Jennifer Stone | Main | Main | Main | Main | Main | Main | | | Guest |
| Theresa Russo | Maria Canals Barrera | Main | Main | Main | Main | Main | Main | Guest | | Guest |
| Jerry Russo | David DeLuise | Main | Main | Main | Main | Main | Main | Guest | | |
| Zeke | Dan Benson | Recurring | Recurring | | Recurring | Recurring | | | | |
| Archie | Steve Valentine | | | Main | | | | | | |
| Javier | Xavier Torres | | | Main | | | | | | |
| Giselle | Jennifer Alden | | | Main | | | | | | |
| Mason Greyback | Gregg Sulkin | | | | Recurring | Recurring | Main | | | Guest |
| Dominic | Beau Mirchoff | | | | | | Main | | | |
| Billie Russo | Janice LeAnn Brown | | | | | | | Main | Main | Main |
| Roman Russo | Alkaio Thiele | | | | | | | Main | Main | Main |
| Milo Russo | Max Matenko | | | | | | | Main | Main | Main |
| Winter | Taylor Cora | | | | | | | Main | Main | Main |
| Giada Russo | Mimi Gianopulos | | | | | | | Main | Main | Main |
| Hershel Laritate | Bill Chott | Guest | Recurring | | Recurring | Recurring | | | Guest | |
| Mantooth | Sean Whalen | | | | Guest | | | | Guest | |

== Main ==
=== Alex Russo ===
Alexandra Margarita Russo (Selena Gomez) is the only female of the three Russo siblings and the middle child. She is sly, rebellious, outgoing, and usually underachieves when it comes to school. She often gets into trouble because of her constant schemes (usually involving magic). Alex and Justin Russo are the only characters to appear in every episode of the series and the shows focus tends to be on her and her journey being/becoming a wizard

=== Justin Russo ===
Justin Vincenzo Pepé Russo (David Henrie) is Alex's and Max's older brother and the oldest of the three Russo siblings. He is very smart and is often considered a "nerd" because he is in numerous clubs and has learned over 5000 spells. He continues his wizard studies in a Monster Hunting course. For his knowledge of wizardry, he takes after his father, Jerry, who originally won the Wizard Family Competition against Kelbo and Megan.

=== Max Russo ===
Maximilian Alonzo Ernesto Russo (Jake T. Austin) is the youngest of the three Russo siblings. Although Max is an underachiever in the beginning, he advances more during the series. During season four, Alex and Justin accidentally turn Max into a little girl who is then given the name "Maxine" (Bailee Madison). Maxine remains as such for six episodes starting from "Three Maxes and a Little Lady" and ending with "Back to Max" when the spell is reversed. At the end of the series, Max becomes fully mortal after losing the Family Wizard Competition, but he inherits the family sub shop instead turning it into a franchise by Wizards Beyond Waverly Place becoming a billionaire.

=== Harper Finkle ===
Harper Finkle (Jennifer Stone) is Alex's best friend. She used to have a crush on her brother, Justin Russo, but eventually falls in love with Justin's best friend, Zeke Beakerman. Harper is a typical teenager: self-expressive but a little insecure at times. Unlike Alex, she is a hardworking student and a fairly positive person. During season 2, Harper finds out about the Russo family's wizard powers.

=== Theresa Russo ===
Theresa Russo (Maria Canals-Barrera) is the mother of Justin, Alex and Max Russo and co-owner of the Waverly Sub Station, with her husband Jerry. Theresa is the slightly more serious one of the couple and doesn't like magic being used in the house. Theresa is Mexican American (as a Latina, Canals Barrera has Spanish ancestry through her Cuban parents).

=== Jerry Russo ===
Jerry Russo (David DeLuise) is the father of Justin, Alex and Max Russo and co-owner of the Waverly Sub Station with his wife Theresa. He is also a former wizard who chose to give up his powers to marry his wife Theresa, a mortal, due to a rule forbidding wizards to marry mortals. Jerry is Italian American (DeLuise also has Italian ancestry).

=== Billie ===
Billie (Janice LeAnn Brown) is a wizard-in-training who comes to live with Justin and his family in the sequel series. She is a young and very powerful wizard. At the end of Season 2, it is revealed that Billie is Alex Russo's daughter, making her Justin's niece.

=== Roman Russo ===
Roman Laritate Russo (Alkaio Thiele) is the oldest son of Justin and Giada Russo and older brother of Milo. He is an intelligent and awkward 12-year-old boy.

=== Milo Russo ===
Milo Russo (Max Matenko) is the youngest son of Justin and Giada Russo as well as Roman's younger brother. He is a creative and goofy fifth grader. His nemesis is his young neighbor, Bella Bianchi.

=== Giada Russo ===
Giada Russo (Mimi Gianopulos) is Roman and Milo Russo's mother and Justin's mortal wife. She is a television journalist for WOWP, which is also the acronym for the original series.

=== Winter ===
Winter (Taylor Cora) is Billie and Roman's best friend. She loves unicorns and is a very cheerful girl.

== Recurring ==
The following is a list of recurring characters in the Disney Channel sitcom Wizards of Waverly Place.

- Zeke Beakerman (Dan Benson) is Justin's best friend. Zeke is in the same grade as Justin. He attends Tribeca Prep and is in advanced chemistry along with Justin. He later starts dating Harper. He had the name of Zack Rosenblatt in his first appearance, but was named Zeke Beakerman in subsequent episodes.
- Mr. Herschel Laritate (Bill Chott) is the principal of Tribeca Prep High School.
- Mason Greyback (Gregg Sulkin; seasons 3–4) is first mentioned in Season 2 episode "Future Harper" when Future Harper tells Alex that she seems irritable and asks if she broke up with Mason yet, implying that she will date a boy named Mason in the future. Mason is first fully introduced as an English student in Alex's art class who has a crush on Alex. They later begin to date. Mason is revealed to be a purebred werewolf who previously dated Juliet. In Wizards Beyond Waverly Place, Mason is revealed to have died at some point between the two series, but reappears as a ghost to help Alex.
- Juliet van Heusen (Bridgit Mendler; seasons 2–4) is a teenage vampire who is Justin Russo's main love interest. When she was born, her parents let her have a soul so she could socialize in the human world. This makes her more compassionate than most vampires, who are usually heartless and cunning. She is characterized as a beautiful girl with blonde hair and rather pale skin.
- Dean Moriarty (Daniel Samonas; seasons 2 and 4) is Alex's boyfriend in the second season. He makes temporary tattoos in the boys bathroom and is interested in cars.
- Professor Crumbs (Ian Abercrombie) is the headmaster of WizTech, whose character acts as a reference to Albus Dumbledore.
- Hugh Normous (Josh Sussman; seasons 1–2 and 4) is adoptive son of two giants and Alex's WizTech friend; he first appeared in "Wizard School".
- Kelbo Russo (Jeff Garlin; seasons 1–3) is the uncle of Alex, Justin and Max, brother of Jerry and Megan and brother-in-law of Theresa. Unlike Jerry, he is very fun and carefree. Kelbo is a full wizard (Jerry had originally won the competition, but gave up his powers to marry a mortal) who often uses his powers childishly, and often seems just as irresponsible with them as Alex is with her own. As a recurring gag, during the post credits scenes in every episode he appears in, he makes a prank call to someone.
- Monotone Woman (Amanda Tepe; seasons 1–2) has played numerous characters during the show's first season, as well as one guest appearance in season two. She appears as a random character who speaks with a monotone voice. Jobs she has held include department store manager, waitress, frozen yogurt store manager, hotel maitre'd, dog show security guard, the information desk lady at Volcano Land (only job in the magic world), art museum security guard, and hot dog vendor. Tepe's only appearance on the show during the second season is in the episode "Wizards vs. Vampires: Dream Date" as the hot dog vendor person. Her name in "New Employee" is Amanda, according to her name tag, but in "Art Museum Piece", her name is Elaine according to Blue Boy. She does not appear in the third and fourth season.

=== Other recurring ===
- Stevie Nichols (Hayley Kiyoko; season 3) is the new troublemaker at school. She was first seen in episode Detention Election where she competes with Alex to see who is the worst behaved girl in school. Afterward, Alex and Stevie form a close friendship. In March 2023, Peter Murrieta confirmed that Stevie was originally meant to be Alex's girlfriend, but Disney did not approve that storyline.
- Rosie (Leven Rambin; season 4) is Justin's angel girlfriend throughout the Wizards vs. Angels story arc.
- Gorog (John Rubinstein; season 4) is an Angel of Darkness. He is the leader of the Dark Angels, who debuts in the episode "Wizards vs. Angels". He is the main antagonist of the Wizards vs. Angels and the Wizards of Apartment 13B story arcs, and a posthumous antagonist in the television special The Wizards Return: Alex vs. Alex. His character and motivations are slightly based on the Satan.
- Alucard and Cindy van Heusen (JD Cullum and Anne Ramsay; season 2) are Juliet's full vampire parents and the owners of the competing sandwich shop on Waverly Place, the Late Nite Bite, appearing in the four-part "Wizards vs. Vampires on Waverly Place" story arc at the end of season two. The name Alucard is the reverse spelling of Dracula.
- Riley (Brian Kubach; season 1) is Alex's crush in "I Almost Drowned in a Chocolate Fountain" and "The Supernatural", and her boyfriend in "Alex's Spring Fling".
- Talia Robinson (McKaley Miller; season 4) is Max's girlfriend. Her first appearance is in "Back to Max". She has an obvious crush on Max.
- Gertrude "Gigi" Hollingsworth (Skyler Samuels; seasons 1–2) is Alex's rival. She has tried to embarrass Alex ever since they were in kindergarten and will often go entirely out of her way to do so.
- The Wannabes (Kelsey Sanders and Heather Trzyna; seasons 1–2) are called "the wannabes" because they want to be as pretty as Gigi.
- Chancellor Rudy Tootietootie (Andy Kindler; seasons 3–4) is the head of the monster hunting council.
- Conscience (Moises Arias; season 3) is Max's inner thoughts of right and wrong, that Max accidentally turns into a real person.
- Frankie/Joey (Paulie Litt; seasons 1 and 3) is Justin's enemy in the first season. He returned in season 3 with his name changed to Joey.

== Minor ==
- Miranda Hampson (Lucy Hale) is Justin's goth girlfriend in two episodes of season one.
- Mr. Stuffleby (Fred Willard) is a character that first appears in the episode "Make it Happen".
- T.J. Taylor (Daryl Sabara) is another teenage wizard that attends Tribeca Prep with Alex, Justin, and Max.
- Officer Lamp (Michael A. Shepperd) is a wizard police officer who partners with Officer Goblin.
- Officer Goblin (Brian Scolaro) is a goblin/wizard police officer.
- The Mummy (John Eric Bentley) is a mummy who kidnapped and bewitched Juliet to be his servant.
- Conscience's Conscience (Adam Irigoyen) is Conscience's conscience when Conscience and Max get separated in Season 3 episode "Night at the Lazerama" and Conscience begins to develop his own conscience.
- Joey (Zack Shada) is a part of Dean's posse. He is the only one who talks in the posse besides Dean.
- Ronald Longcape Jr. (Chad Duell) is an evil kid at WizTech.
- Ronald Longcape Sr. (Maurice Godin) is Ronald Longcape Jr.'s father.
- Dr. Mary-Beth Evilini (Octavia Spencer) is an evil former teacher at WizTech.
- Frankengirl/Frankie Stein (Perry Mattfeld) is a female monster Justin created to guard his room from Alex in the season 3 episode "Franken Girl".
- Megan Russo (Carrie Genzel) is the embittered aunt of Alex, Justin and Max, and sister of Jerry and Kelbo and sister-in-law of Theresa.
- Susan (Tiffany Thornton) is one of Justin's academic friends.
- MacGruder (Michael Monken) is a popular kid at Tribeca Prep who gets everyone to do what he does.
- Warren Nichols (Richard Chiu) is Stevie's brother whom she left in the middle of the power-transfer ceremony after he won their family's wizard competition.
- Tutor Hatchback (Paulina Olszynski) is Max's magical tutor.

== Film ==
Characters only appear in Wizards of Waverly Place: The Movie.

- Archie (Steve Valentine) is a skilled, but unlucky and sardonic illusionist and con artist, and serves as the comical foil and anti-hero of the movie.
- Giselle (Jennifer Alden) is a female wizard. She was turned into a parrot and is the driving force for the search of The Stone of Dreams through the manipulation of Archie and the Russos.
- Javier (Xavier Enrique Torres) is a host at the hotel the Russos were staying at in the Caribbean.

== TV special ==
Characters only appear in The Wizards Return: Alex vs. Alex.

- Dominic (Beau Mirchoff) is an evil, manipulative, self-absorbed wizard. Dominic was one of Justin's assistants at WizTech and delivers a message for the Russo family. He is later revealed to be the nephew of Gorog.
- Carmela (Natalia Nogulich) is an Italian cousin of Jerry Russo, and was a wizard in training with him.
- Francesca (Antonella Lentini) is an Italian cousin of the Russo family. When Max first sees her, he tries to pursue her, but when he tries to kiss her, she smacks him.

== Guests ==
- Heidi Swedberg as Miss Majorheely ("Art Teacher") 2.15 (2009)
- Austin Butler as George ("Positive Alex") 3.10 (2010)
- Cindy Crawford as Bebe Rockford ("Fashion Week") 2.13 (2009)
- Rachel Dratch as Future Harper/"H.J. Darling" ("Future Harper") 2.16 (2009)
- Julia Duffy as Ms. Angela ("Credit Check") 1.18 (2008)
- Willie Garson as Mr. Frenchy ("Fashion Week") 2.13 (2009)
- Dwayne Johnson as himself ("Art Teacher") 2.15 (2009)
- Lee Meriwether as "Battle Diva" ("Harper Knows") 2.08 (2008)
- Belita Moreno as Magdalena Larkin ("Quinceanera") 1.20 (2008)
- Sara Paxton as Millie ("Credit Check") 1.18 (2008)
- Rob Reiner as himself ("Future Harper") – Reiner is seen in the episode's tag scene
- Adam Irigoyen as Conscience's Conscience ("Night at the Lazerama") 3.05 (2009)
- Phill Lewis as Marion Moseby ("Cast Away (to Another Show)"), 2.25 (2009) part of the "Wizards on Deck with Hannah Montana" crossover)
- Debby Ryan as Bailey Pickett ("Cast Away (to Another Show)", 2.25 (2009) part of the "Wizards on Deck with Hannah Montana" crossover)
- Brenda Song as London Tipton ("Cast Away (to Another Show)", part of the "Wizards on Deck with Hannah Montana" crossover)
- Cole Sprouse as Cody Martin ("Cast Away (to Another Show)", part of the "Wizards on Deck with Hannah Montana" crossover)
- Dylan Sprouse as Zack Martin ("Cast Away (to Another Show)", part of the "Wizards on Deck with Hannah Montana" crossover)
- Chelsea Staub as Kari Landsdorf ("The Supernatural") 1.15 (2008)
- Malese Jow as Ruby Donahue ("Movies") 1.09 (2007)
- Tiffany Thornton as Susan ("Movies") 1.09 (2007)
- Misty May-Treanor as herself ("Art Teacher") 2.15 (2008)
- Eric Allan Kramer as Coach Gunderson ("Alex in the Middle") 1.15 (2007)
- Jo Anne Worley as Maggie ("Alex Does Good") 2.17 (2009)
- Bella Thorne as Nancy Lukey ("Max's Secret Girlfriend") 3.19 (2010)
- Laura Ashley Samuels as Sara ("Moving On") 3.26 (2010)
- Shakira as herself ("Dude, Looks Like Shakira") 3.12 (2010)
- Kate Flannery as Elaine Finkle ("Wizards vs. Finkles") 3.23 (2010)
- Scot Robinson as Marty Finkle ("Wizards vs. Finkles") 3.23 (2010)
- Wilmer Valderrama as Uncle Ernesto (""Uncle Ernesto") 3.25 (2010)
- John O'Hurley as Captain Jim Sherwood ("Captain Jim Bob Sherwood") 3.22 (2010)
- Bailee Madison as Maxine Russo ("Three Maxes and a Little Lady – Back to Max") 4.5 – 4.10 (2011)
- Shane Harper as Fidel ("Three Maxes and a Little Lady") 4.5 (2011)
- China Anne McClain as Tina ("Wizards vs. Angels") 4.09 (2011)
- Jackie Evancho as Choir Girl/Herself ("Back to Max") 4.10 (2011)
- Valente Rodriguez as Bob "Muy Macho" ("Magic Unmasked") 4.12 (2011)
- Tim Conway as Cragmont ("Justin's Back In") 4.18 (2011)
- Joely Fisher as Meg Robinson ("Alex the Puppetmaster") 4.19 (2011)
- James Urbaniak as Rob Robinson ("Alex the Puppetmaster") 4.19 (2011)
