= Vampirina: Teenage Vampire =

American television series

- Genre: Musical; Comedy
- Based on: Vampirina by Chris Nee; Vampirina Ballerina by Anne Marie Pace
- Developed by: Randi Barnes
- Showrunners: Dan Cross; David Hoge
- Starring: Kenzi Richardson; Jiwon Lee; Shaun Dixon; Milo Maharlika; Faith Hedley
- Theme music composer: Kari Kimmel; Jackson Hoffman
- Opening theme: "S-L-A-Y" by Kenzi Richardson
- Composer: Rebecca Kneubuhl
- Country of origin: United States
- Original language: English
- No. of seasons: 2
- No. of episodes: 22

Production
- Executive producers: Dan Cross; David Hoge; Randi Barnes; Tim Federle; Bronwyn North-Reist; Kimberly McCullough; Meg DeLoatch
- Producers: Teresa Kale; Kevin O'Donnell
- Cinematography: John Simmons
- Editor: Jeff Wright
- Camera setup: Multi-camera
- Running time: 21–26 minutes
- Production companies: Cross Hoge Productions; Chorus Boy; Kenwood TV Productions

Original release
- Network: Disney Channel
- Release: September 12, 2025 – present

Vampirina: Teenage Vampire is an American musical sitcom television series developed by Randi Barnes. The series is based on the Disney Jr. series Vampirina, which in turn is adapted from the Vampirina Ballerina books by Anne Marie Pace. It premiered on Disney Channel on September 12, 2025. The series stars Kenzi Richardson, Jiwon Lee, Shaun Dixon, Milo Maharlika, and Faith Hedley.

== Premise ==
Vee Hauntley, a teenage vampire, leaves Transylvania to attend a performing arts boarding school. While living among humans, she pursues her passion for music while keeping her vampire identity secret to evade the Van Helsing vampire hunters. The challenge escalates when her overprotective parents send an overzealous ghost to accompany her, and one of her classmates conceals the fact that he is a Van Helsing.

== Cast ==
=== Main ===
- Kenzi Richardson as Vampirina "Vee" Hauntley, a 13-year-old vampire passionate about singing. The episode "First Day of School" reveals her full name as Vampirina Bubonica Hauntley.
- Jiwon Lee as Sophie Choi, Vee's kind and nervous roommate and best friend, who is also a DJ.
- Shaun Dixon as Elijah Summers, Vee's crush, who secretly belongs to the Van Helsing family and is hesitant to follow in their footsteps.
- Milo Maharlika as Demetrius "Demi" Montague Philosan, an overzealous 600-year-old ghost assigned to watch over Vee.
- Faith Hedley as Britney Hightower, a talented legacy student at Wilson Hall and Vee's frenemy.

=== Recurring ===
- Jeff Meacham as Boris Hauntley, Vee's father.
- Kate Reinders as Oxana Hauntley, Vee's mother.
- Kim Coles as Dean Merriweather, the dean of Wilson Hall.
- Hannah Whitley as Moriah Summers, Elijah's older sister and a substitute teacher at Wilson Hall.
- Ava Jean as Hazel
- Jodie Sweetin as Sorcerer Queen

=== Notable guest stars ===
- Jenna Davis as Megan, a magnetic upperclassman at Wilson Hall and leader of the Spotlights club.
- Mykal-Michelle Harris as Ruby, a blood moon fairy who grants Vee's wish to redo Halloween.
- Janice LeAnn Brown as Billie, a wizard from Staten Island and longtime friend of Vee.
- Ariel Martin as Emily Eisenberg / Millie Eyelash, a kind and famous pop music star who visits Wilson Hall.
- Hudson Stone as James Jordan

== Production ==
On November 1, 2024, Disney Branded Television gave a series order to a live-action adaptation of Vampirina. The series is developed by Randi Barnes, who serves as the showrunner and an executive producer of the pilot alongside Kimberly McCullough. Barnes and McCullough stepped down from said duties for the rest of the season, and Dan Cross and David Hoge were hired to replace them. Tim Federle, Bronwyn North-Reist and Meg DeLoatch also serve as executive producers. On August 12, 2025, it was announced that the series, under the new title of Vampirina: Teenage Vampire, would premiere on September 12, 2025. It was also announced that there would be a special crossover episode with Wizards Beyond Waverly Place with Janice LeAnn Brown reprising her role as Billie, which premiered on October 24, 2025.

On September 1, 2026, it was announced that the series would have a second season, which premiered on Disney Channel on October 6, 2026, and the whole season premiered on Disney+ on October 7, 2026. The main cast returned, with Jodie Sweetin and Ava Jean joining the recurring cast and Hudson Stone making a guest star appearance.

== Episodes ==
=== Series overview ===
Season	Episodes	Originally released	
Season	Episodes	First released	Last released
1	16	September 12, 2025	November 14, 2025
2	6	October 6, 2026	

=== Season 1 (2025) ===
No. overall	No. in season	Title	Directed by	Written by	Original release date	Prod. code	U.S. viewers (millions)
1	1	"First Year to Watch"	Kimberly McCullough	Randi Barnes	September 12, 2025	101	0.09
Vampirina "Vee" Hauntley is a teenage vampire who dreams of performing music and living openly as a vampire. After a nightmare about being rejected by humans, she leaves Transylvania to attend Wilson Hall, a performing arts boarding school. Her ghost friend Demi secretly tags along, sent by her parents to protect her from the Van Helsings, a family of vampire hunters. At school, Vee meets her roommate Sophie, and they bond over their shared love of pop music star Millie Eyelash. Vee impulsively signs them up to perform at the first-year showcase, which makes Sophie uneasy. Demi becomes suspicious of Britney, a snobby classmate, and warns Vee she might be a Van Helsing. When Sophie discovers Vee's secret, she feels betrayed and distances herself. Meanwhile, Vee befriends Elijah, a classmate who secretly loves hip-hop but hides it from his strict, traditional parents. During the showcase, Vee starts performing alone—until Sophie returns and joins her onstage. Elijah also joins them with a rap, and the trio wins the show. Afterward, Demi realizes Britney's ring stands for "Wilson Hall," not Van Helsing. Elijah puts on a ring marked "V.H." — revealing he is a Van Helsing. Featured songs: "Face the Light", "Supernatural" Guest stars: Kate Reinders as Oxana Hauntley, Jeff Meacham as Boris Hauntley, Kim Coles as Dean Merriweather
2	2	"First Day of School"	Paul Hoen	Story by : Randi Barnes and Dan Cross & David Hoge; Teleplay by : Dan Cross & David Hoge	September 12, 2025	102	0.08
Featured song: "Where I Belong" Guest stars: Kate Reinders as Oxana Hauntley, Jeff Meacham as Boris Hauntley, Kim Coles as Dean Merriweather, Jordan Clark as Ms. Etherton
3	3	"First Dance"	Paul Hoen	Erin Dunlap	September 19, 2025	103	0.08
The Welcome to Wilson Hall Welcome Dance is in full swing and Vee and Elijah want to ask each other out. Vee cannot control when she fangs out and Elijah now has super strength that destroys anything he touches. Meanwhile, Sophie is struggling to find her DJ identity, until Elijah calls her "DJ PJ" since she wore her pajamas to the dance. Britney tricks Vee into thinking the theme is "Enchanted by the Bard," in which Vee shows up to the dance dressed in that theme and is humiliated when everyone laughs at her. She starts to fang out again, but she realizes that she still has a chance to be crowned princess at the dance. Vee and Britney initiate a dance battle, which Britney ultimately wins and gets crowned princess. Vee storms off and Britney apologizes to her and tells her that Elijah would love to dance with her. Vee and Elijah dance together and notice how freakishly strong they are. She sees Elijah's ring and notices the "V.H." initials and realizes he is a Van Helsing. Elijah realizes that Vee is a vampire when she fangs out right in front of him. They both run off in fear. Guest star: Kim Coles as Dean Merriweather
4	4	"First Parents Day"	Jody Margolin Hahn	Teresa Kale	September 19, 2025	104	0.07
Vee and Elijah are still shaken up about the events that transpired at the dance. In the morning, they challenge each other to a fight but end up backing out because it's their parents that are enemies, not them. They end up staying friends and promising to never hurt each other, but Demi threatens to hurt Elijah if he breaks that promise. Vee, Elijah, and Sophie are walking down the dorm hallway while discussing the schools Parents Day when Elijah enters his room to discover his mother sitting on his bed leading to him immediately shutting the door. Vee and Sophie return to their dorm so Vee can hide from Elijah's mother during Parents Day when Vee's parents hit the glass of her window while in their bat form, Vee's parents discover it's Parents Day. Vee and Elijah are nervous that their parents will cross paths and do everything they can to keep their parents away from each other to avoid any altercation. During a school assembly Dean Merriweather calls for a stage fight and ask for volunteers from the audience. Vee's mother, Oxana, and Elijah's mother, Mrs. Summers, both volunteer to do the sword fight demonstration and act as if they have never been in a fight. As soon as the demonstrations begins both mothers show their true talents as capable fighters and it isn't until Oxana is down and facing down Mrs. Summers sword that Vee tries to stop it, by asking Mrs. Summers to stand down, but she has already yielded her sword. Oxana and Mrs. Summers shake hands and the audience applauds them. Mrs. Summers realizes that she lost her family insignia ring and Vee's parents offer to help locate it and ask for a description of the lost heirloom. Mrs. Summers describes the ring and right before almost revealing the initials on the ring are, Elijah reveals that he loves hip-hop, rap, and pop music. His mother angrily storms off and Elijah finds the ring before running after her. The two talk about what Elijah just revealed and ultimately Mrs. Summers is okay with Elijah switching his classes to align more with his likes because she wants him to be happy. The next day, Mrs. Summers sees Elijah and Vee in the cafeteria and then proceeds to call someone, telling them that she needs them at Wilson Hall immediately because she thinks Elijah is getting distracted from what's important. Guest stars: Jeff Meacham as Boris Hauntley, Kate Reinders as Oxana Hauntley, Kim Coles as Dean Merriweather, Tammy Townsend as Mrs. Summers Absent: Faith Hedley as Britney Hightower
5	5	"First Enemy"	Robbie Countryman	Meg DeLoatch	September 26, 2025	106	0.09
Featured song: "Chef's Kiss" Guest star: Hannah Whitley as Moriah
6	6	"First Club"	Robbie Countryman	Marie Cheng	September 26, 2025	107	N/A
Featured song: "Do It All Again" Guest stars: Jenna Davis as Megan, Ken Weiler as Head Vampire
7	7	"First Halloween"	Jody Margolin Hahn	Farhan Arshad	October 3, 2025	105	0.07
Featured song: "Fangfoot Stomp" Special guest star: Mykal-Michelle Harris as Ruby
8	8	"First Nightmare"	Phill Lewis	Zachary Gonzalez-Landis	October 3, 2025	108	N/A
Absent: Faith Hedley as Britney Hightower
9	9	"First Final"	Danielle Fishel	Cat Davis	October 10, 2025	109	0.11
Featured songs: "Presto", "Cypher", "Shoot For The Stars" Guest stars: Hannah Whitley as Moriah, Zion as Jordan Absent: Faith Hedley as Britney Hightower
10	10	"First Holiday"	Danielle Fishel	Naomi Lambert	October 10, 2025	110	0.11
Featured song: "Every Star (Is Meant To Shine On Christmas)" Guest stars: Kim Coles as Dean Merriweather, Jenna Davis as Megan
11	11	"First Vampire Friend"	Morenike Joela Evans	Alice Gammill	October 17, 2025 (Note: This episode was first released on Disney+ on October 15, 2025.)	111	0.09
Guest star: Kim Coles as Dean Merriweather
12	12	"First Heartbeat"	Danielle Fishel	Madilyn Cook	October 24, 2025	112	0.10
Guest stars: Janice LeAnn Brown as Billie, Nicole Sullivan as Dr. Lugosi, Kelly Perine as Eugene
13	13	"First Power Trip"	Jody Margolin Hahn	Meg DeLoatch	October 24, 2025	113	0.08
Featured song: "My Moment" Guest stars: Kim Coles as Dean Merriweather, Ariel Martin as Millie Eyelash
14	14	"First Pet"	Jonathan Judge	Cat Davis & Zachary Gonzalez-Landis	October 31, 2025	114	N/A
Guest star: Kim Coles as Dean Merriweather
15	15	"First Villain"	Jonathan Judge	Cat Davis & Zachary Gonzalez-Landis	November 7, 2025	115	N/A
Featured song: "Maybe I'm Falling" Guest stars: Kim Coles as Dean Merriweather, Jon Martens as Lucien
16	16	"First Full Vampire"	Jonathan Judge	Teresa Kale	November 14, 2025	116	N/A
Featured song: "Force of Nature" Guest stars: Ariel Martin as Millie Eyelash, Kim Coles as Dean Merriweather, Hannah Whitley as Moriah, Jon Martens as Lucien

=== Season 2 (2026) ===
No. overall	No. in season	Title	Directed by	Written by	Original release date	Prod. code	U.S. viewers (millions)
17	1	"Second to Breathe"	Jody Margolin Hahn	Dan Cross & David Hoge	October 6, 2026	201	N/A
Guest stars: Kim Coles as Dean Merriweather, Jodie Sweetin as Sorcerer Queen, Ava Jean as Hazel, Sahana Srinivasan as Ms. Olsen
18	2	"On Second Thought, Bro"	Jody Margolin Hahn	Meg DeLoatch	October 6, 2026	202	N/A
Guest stars: Kim Coles as Dean Merriweather, Ava Jean as Hazel, Hudson Stone as James
19	3	"Second Verse"	Kelly Elizabeth Jensen	Naomi Lambert & Ekaterina Vladimirova	October 6, 2026	203	N/A
Guest star: Ava Jean as Hazel
20	4	"Second Banana"	Robbie Countryman	Madilyn Cook & Alice Gammill	October 6, 2026	204	N/A
Guest stars: Kim Coles as Dean Merriweather, Jodie Sweetin as Sorcerer Queen, Ava Jean as Hazel, Jenna Davis as Megan
21	5	"Second Guessing"	Jonathan Judge	Erin Dunlap	October 6, 2026	205	N/A
Guest stars: Kim Coles as Dean Merriweather, Jodie Sweetin as Sorcerer Queen, Ava Jean as Hazel, Jenna Davis as Megan
22	6	"The Last Second"	Jonathan Judge	Teresa Kale	October 6, 2026	206	N/A
Guest stars: Kim Coles as Dean Merriweather, Jodie Sweetin as Sorcerer Queen, Ava Jean as Hazel, Jenna Davis as Megan

== Music ==
The debut single from the series, the theme song "S-L-A-Y", performed by star Kenzi Richardson and written by Kari Kimmel and Jackson Hoffman, was released on September 12, 2025. The full soundtrack to the series was released on October 10, 2025. Other songwriters and producers for the show include Jason Mater, Matthew Tishler, Cozi Zuehlsdorff, Lucky West, Paris Carney, Brandon C. Rogers, William Behlendorf, Antonina Armato, Tim James, Adam Schmalholz, Thomas Armato Sturges, Doug Rockwell, Tova Litvin, Jeannie Lurie, Josh Cumbee, Jordan Powers, John Kavanaugh, and David Goldsmith.

== Release ==
Vampirina: Teenage Vampire premiered on Disney Channel on September 12, 2025. All episodes of the first season were released on Disney+ in the United States on October 15, 2025, with episodes 11–16 being released prior to their televised premieres. The second season premiered on October 6, 2026, followed by Disney+ the next day.

== Ratings ==
Viewership and ratings per season of Vampirina: Teenage Vampire
Season	Episodes	First aired		Last aired		Avg. viewers (millions)
Season	Episodes	Date	Viewers (millions)	Date	Viewers (millions)	Avg. viewers (millions)
1	16	September 12, 2025	0.09	November 14, 2025	TBD	0.09

=== Accolades ===
Award	Date of ceremony	Category	Recipient(s)	Result
Art Directors Guild Awards	February 28, 2026	Excellence in Production Design for a Multi-Camera Series	Maggie Ruder (for "First Nightmare")	Nominated
Hollywood Music in Media Awards	November 19, 2025	Best Song - Onscreen Performance - TV Show/Limited Series	Kenzi Richardson (for "Force of Nature")	Nominated
TCA Awards	August 20, 2026	Outstanding Achievement in Family Programming	Vampirina: Teenage Vampire	Nominated
