= Janice LeAnn Brown =

American actress

- Born: September 27, 2010 (age 16); United States
- Occupation: Actress
- Years active: 2017–present

Janice LeAnn Brown (born September 27, 2010) is an American actress. She is best known for playing the lead role of Billie in the Disney Channel series Wizards Beyond Waverly Place.

== Early life ==
Brown was born in September 2010 to a single mother who served in the U.S. Army. She was adopted by her maternal grandparents. She grew up in Columbia, South Carolina, Upstate New York, and Colorado, where her mother was stationed before settling in Los Angeles at the age of 4.

== Career ==
Early on in her career she made appearances in the teen drama series Euphoria, the drama film Montross: Blood Rules, the sitcom Growing Up Immigrant and the romantic film Endings, Beginnings Her biggest role so far has been playing the lead role of Billie in the Disney Channel series Wizards Beyond Waverly Place. She had doubts about getting the role due to her stuttering her lines in the audition.

== Personal life ==
Brown likes roller skating. She is a huge music fan with her favorite artists being Sade and Jhené Aiko. She also enjoys playing video games such as The Last of Us. Her acting idol is Gina Rodriguez.

== Filmography ==
=== Film ===
Year	Title	Role	Notes
2019	Endings, Beginnings	Abigail	
2020	Playing with Beethoven	Sheila	
2022	Montrose: Blood Rules	Andrea Montross	
2023	Fathead	Ragamuffin	Short

=== Television ===
Year	Title	Role	Notes
2017	Black-ish	Young Bow	Episode: "Public Fool"
2017	Do You Want to See a Dead Body?	Homeless Girl	Episode: "A Body and an Actor"
2018	Growing Up Immigrant	Kessie Ajayi	3 episodes
2019	Muppet Babies: Play Date	Girl	1 episode
2019	Euphoria	Young Rue	2 episodes
2020	Just Roll with It	Helen	Episode: "The Great Coconuts Caper"
2022	Best Foot Forward	DD	2 episodes
2024	Bunk'd	Frankie	Episode: "And The Kiki Goes To..."
2024–2026	Wizards Beyond Waverly Place	Billie Russo-Penwulf	Lead role
2025	Vampirina: Teenage Vampire	Billie Russo-Penwulf	Episode: "First Heartbeat"

== Awards and nominations ==
Year	Award	Category	Work	Result
2025	Kids' Choice Awards	Favorite Female TV Star (Kids)	Wizards Beyond Waverly Place	Nominated
