= Jim Gianopulos =

American businessman

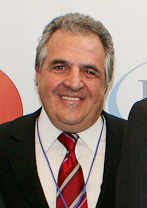
- Born: March 28, 1952 (age 74); New York City, U.S.
- Education: Boston University (B.A.); Fordham University (J.D.)
- Occupation: Entertainment executive
- Spouse: Ann Gianopulos
- Children: 3, including Mimi

James N. Gianopulos (Greek: Δημήτρης Γιαννόπουλος) is an American businessman. He was chairman and CEO of 20th Century Fox and chairman and CEO of Paramount Pictures until his departure in September 2021.

== Early life and education ==
Gianopulos was born in 1952 in Brooklyn, New York City. He is a second-generation Greek American. He graduated from Boston University with a Bachelor of Arts degree in 1973, received a Juris Doctor from the Fordham University School of Law in 1976, and attended the Master's program at the New York University School of Law.

== Career ==
=== Paramount ===
Gianopulos started his career by working at Columbia Pictures and Paramount. In 1992, he was appointed President of 20th Century Fox International, where he was responsible for the marketing and distribution of the studio's films and television programs.

=== Fox ===
From 2000 to 2012, Gianopulos was chairman and CEO of Fox Filmed Entertainment with Tom Rothman. During that time, the company earned over $30 billion from the box office and made the then two highest-grossing films, Titanic and Avatar; and twenty movies he greenlit each grossed over $100 million domestically ($160 million in current dollars), and 26 movies that fetched $100 million internationally. Fox films during his tenure were nominated for more than 150 Academy Awards and won three Best Picture Awards, including Slumdog Millionaire, which won the Best Picture Oscar in 2008.

Gianopulos took over as the sole chairman and CEO of Fox beginning in 2012. In this position, he was the head of 20th Century Fox, Fox Searchlight, Fox 2000, Fox Animation/Blue Sky Studios, Fox International Productions, and Fox Home Entertainment. During his tenure, the studio had its most profitable years and broke the industry's global box-office record in 2014. Some notable successes during his time at Fox include two of the biggest box office hits of all time, Titanic and Avatar, as well as several entries into the Planet of the Apes, Ice Age, and X-Men franchises, as well as Deadpool (2016), and The Martian (2015).

At Fox, Gianopulos supported a closer relationship between Hollywood and Silicon Valley, and he was instrumental in the launch of iTunes, the Hulu streaming service, and other internet-driven offerings.

=== Paramount Pictures ===
In March 2017, he was named chairman and CEO of Paramount Pictures, after the dismissal of the late Brad Grey. Gianopulos began his duties on April 3, 2017. He oversaw all feature film and television production, marketing, and global distribution. Under his leadership, Paramount experienced a revitalization, with Gianopulos focusing on returning the studio to profitability. After Paramount had suffered years of losses, including an operating loss of $445 million the year before Gianopulos was hired in 2017, by 2019 he had returned the studio to its first full-year profit.

During his tenure, Paramount released a succession of successful films, including A Quiet Place (2018), Mission: Impossible – Fallout (2018), Rocketman (2019), and Sonic the Hedgehog (2020). He put into production the box office blockbuster Top Gun: Maverick (2022), as well as Sonic the Hedgehog 2 (2022), A Quiet Place Part II (2021), IF (2024), The Lost City (2022), Mission: Impossible – Dead Reckoning Part One (2023), and Mission: Impossible – The Final Reckoning (2025). Gianopulos was also responsible for the expansion of Paramount Television Studios, including the release of The Offer, a drama series about the making of The Godfather, as well as Shantaram, Fatal Attraction, and many other series.

It was announced that CBS and Viacom (parent company of Paramount Pictures) would recombine as ViacomCBS in December 2019. Jim Gianopulos was confirmed to continue on as chairman and CEO of Paramount Pictures under the merged ViacomCBS. Gianopulos left Paramount in September 2021 and was replaced by Nickelodeon president Brian Robbins.

=== Board associations ===
Gianopulos is chairman of the board of directors of the Motion Picture & Television Fund. He is also on the board of the X Prize Foundation as well as the board of the University of Southern California School of Cinematic Arts, where he is also an adjunct professor. Gianopulos is a member of the board of trustees of the Academy Museum of Motion Pictures, and is its treasurer.

=== Awards and recognition ===
Gianopulos has received accolades for his contributions to the entertainment industry, including the Simon Wiesenthal Center's Humanitarian Award in 2013, the Will Rogers Motion Picture Pioneers Foundation's 2015 Pioneer of the Year award, and the Producers Guild of America Milestone Award in 2016.

== Personal life ==
He is married to Ann Gianopulos. They have three daughters, Mimi, Alexa, and Niki.
