= Anne Marie Pace =

American author

- Education: College of William & Mary
- Occupation: Author
- Known for: Vampirina Ballerina
- Website: www.annemariepace.com

Anne Marie Pace is an American author, known for her Vampirina Ballerina books. She attended the College of William & Mary, where she graduated in 1987 with a bachelor's degree in English. She went to graduate school at the University of Virginia. Prior to becoming a full-time writer, Pace wrote for children's magazines.

== Bibliography ==
- Never Ever Talk to Strangers (2010, Scholastic, illustrated by Guy Francis)
- A Teacher for Bear (2011, Scholastic, illustrated by Mike Wohnoutka)
- Pigloo (2016, Henry Holt, illustrated by Lorna Hussey)
- Groundhug Day (2017, Disney-Hyperion, illustrated by Christopher Denise)
- Busy-Eyed Day (2018, Beach Lane Books/Simon & Schuster, illustrated by Frann Preston-Gannon)
- Sunny's Tow Truck Saves the Day (2019, Abrams Appleseed, illustrated by Christopher Lee)
- Mouse Calls (2022, Beach Lane Books/Simon & Schuster, illustrated by Erin Kraan)

She has also written biographies of Alexander Hamilton, Dorothea Dix, and Anne Hutchinson and historical fiction chapter books for the Core Knowledge Foundation.

=== Vampirina Ballerina ===
- Vampirina Ballerina (2012, illustrated by LeUyen Pham)
- Vampirina Ballerina Hosts a Sleepover (2013, illustrated by LeUyen Pham)
- Vampirina at the Beach (2017, illustrated by LeUyen Pham)
- Vampirina in the Snow (2018, illustrated by LeUyen Pham)

In March 2016, the cable channel Disney Junior announced the development of Vampirina, an animated television series based on the Vampirina Ballerina books, which premiered in October 2017.

In November 2024, Disney Channel announced the development of a live-action Vampirina television series, Vampirina: Teenage Vampire, The show premiered on September 12, 2025.
