= Daniel Benson =

Daniel Benson may refer to:

- Daniel R. Benson (born 1975), Mercer County Executive and former member of the New Jersey General Assembly
- Danny Benson (born 2003), English footballer
- Dan Benson (born 1987), American actor who played Zeke Beakerman on the Disney Channel series Wizards of Waverly Place
- Daniel Benson (born 1997), Nigerian Afro-fusion musician known professionally as Bnxn (pronounced as Benson)
