= Best Foot Forward (TV series) =

Apple TV+ Series

Best Foot Forward is an American family comedy series produced by Apple TV+, based on the memoir Just Don't Fall by Josh Sundquist. The series premiered in 2022. The protagonist, Josh Dubin, is played by Logan Marmino, a congenital amputee. Kyle was played by Peyton Jackson, and Gabriella by Trinity Jo-Li Bliss.

The series won awards, including the Children's & Family Emmy Award, and was nominated for several such as the Young Entertainer Award.

== Summary ==
The show follows a young amputee, Josh Dubin (Logan Marmino), as he transitions from homeschool to public school, eager to experience everything. Josh is shown to have two friends, Kyle (Peyton Jackson) and Gabriella (Trinity Jo-Li Bliss). During his time there, however, he faces challenges including how to get fellow students to see him for who he is rather than by his prosthetic leg.

== Critical reception ==
The series received a generally positive critical response. Writing in The New York Times, described the show as notable for involving people with disabilities both in front of and behind the camera.

Review aggregator Rotten Tomatoes reported an approval rating of 92% based on three critic reviews for the first season, including reviews from The A.V. Club and Decider. Common Sense Media gave the series 4 out of 5 stars, with reviewer Joly Herman praising its handling of disability and family dynamics.

== Cast ==
Character	Actor
Josh Dubin	Logan Marmino
Gary	Stephen Schenieider
Maggie	Joy Suprano
Kyle	Peyton Jackson
Gabriella	Trinity Jo-Li Bliss
Matthew	Roger Dale Floyd
Luisa	Romy Fay
Eli	Liam Kyle
Kelly	Bridget Kallal
Meg	Isabella Meneses
Mikayla	Mia Davila
Amy Park	Waverly Corinne Meier
Principal Keifer	Brian Stepanek
Kyle H.	Tristan Riggs
Mr. Polk	Rizwan Manji
Mariana	Bella Blanding
Darren	Aariq Manji
Kyle S.	Nico David
Miss Kennedy	Diana Sanchez
Larry Sgroi	Josh Sundquist
Deirdre	Skylar Morgan Jones
Riley	Emma Vivien Garcia
DD	Janice LeAnn Brown
Coach Barth	Carly Jibson
Mrs. Alderman	Jill Basey
Mrs. Wrigley	Nicole Lynn Evans
Coach Morgan	Felice Heather Monteith
Luke	Yurt Yargrt
Chris Kibler	Van Brunelle
Devon	Dayne Jarrah
Ella	Ella Gross
Gabe	Landen Yu
Joel	Zach Justice
Imani	Pragnya Geddada
Moira	Morgan Lynn Weir
Alice	Anna Grace Philippe
Maria	Rachel Alana Handler
Hawk	Josiah Sameula
Young Maggie	Maryssa Hayden
Young Gary	Elliot Moss
Daphne	Caroline Haskins
Classmates (uncredited)	Reila Post
Middle School Kid (uncredited)	Ivan Fraser
Movie Goer (uncredited)	Alice Kina Diehl

== Episodes ==
The show consists of 10 episodes as of its release in 2022.

Season 1
Episode	Synopsis
1) Public School	Josh begins public school after making a deal with his mom and dad, but an unlucky accident makes it harder to blend in.
2) Elevator	Principal Keifer gives access to a school resource; Josh gets a new nickname, and Kyle has a plan to gain popularity.
3) Clubs	Josh joins every club with enthusiasm, but falls short of his friend Gabriella, realizing there is only so much time in a day.
4) Soccer	A surprise at soccer tryouts impacts Josh's confidence, and upsets a fellow teammate.
5) Pop Quiz	Josh doubts his abilities, and struggles to open up about his feelings with Kyle and Gabriella after making mistakes on a math test.
6) Halloween	When the gang prepares for a costume showcase, Josh accepts an initially difficult alteration, and Gabriella faces pressure from her peers.
7) Movie Night	Josh attempts to sneak a treat in the hopes of having an epic movie night, but a security guard puts a halt to their plan.
8) Skateboard	Josh meets Matt's skate park friends and decides to try out his new prosthetic leg. Matt struggles with sharing the attention, and Gabriella deals with tough news.
9) Field Day	During the field day, Josh struggles to compromise when his peers discover that he can offer them a competitive advantage.
10) School Dance	Josh attempts to make his first dance meaningful; his parents rewatch an old video of their first dance.

== Development ==
The series is loosely based on Just Don't Fall by Josh Sundquist. Sundquist lost his leg to a rare form of cancer when he was nine years old. The series Best Foot Forward is based on his life three years after his amputation when he left homeschool to join public school.

According to Sundquist, finding an actor who has one leg was a challenge. In an interview, he said "Our main character presented a challenge. How do you find a 12-year-old boy who’s a great actor and has one leg?" Logan Marmino was following Sundquist on social media, and when he was tagged on the casting call on Sundquist's Instagram, he submitted an audition. Sundquist said that "from his first audition, we saw how special he was."

Logan Marmino won the role, and spent four months in Los Angeles filming the series.

== Awards ==
Award	Year	Category	Winner
Seal of Authentic Representation	2022	Authentic representaion	Best Foot Forward
Emmy	2023	Outstanding Casting for a Live Action program	Danielle Aufiero • Amber Horn • Steven Tylor O'Connor
Young Artlist Award	2023	Best Performance in a Streaming Series: Supporting Young Actor	Tristan Riggs
DGA Award	2023	Outstanding Directorial Achievement in Children's programs	Anne Renton
Young Artlist Award	2024	Best Performance in a Streaming Series: Supporting Young Actor	Tristan Riggs

Nominee	Year	Category	Winner
Emmy	2023	Outstanding Children's or Family Viewing Series	Matt Fleckenstein • Meghan Mathes • Joel S. Rice • Josh Sundquist • Eric Goldberg • Peter Tibbals • Bernadette Luckett • Zach Anner • Gillian Grassie • Deb Spindell
Young Entertainer Award	2023	Best Recurring Actor - Telivision Series	Tristan Riggs
Young Artlist Award	2023	Best Performance in a Streaming Series: Supporting Teen Actress	Trinity Jo-Li Bliss
Artios Award	2024	Outstanding Achievement in Casting - Children and Family Pilot and Series - Live Action	Danielle Aufiero • Amber Horn • Steven Tylor O'Connor
