= Ramón Enrique Torres =

Puerto Rican reporter, journalist and news anchor (1952–2023)

Ramón Enrique Torres Guzmán
- Torres in 2020
- Born: October 26, 1952; Ponce, Puerto Rico
- Died: December 13, 2023 (aged 71)
- Education: University of Puerto Rico
- Occupations: News anchor, reporter
- Years active: 1976–2021
- Notable credit: Informe 79
- Children: Layza Torres; Xavier Enrique Torres

Ramón Enrique Torres Guzmán (October 26, 1952 – December 13, 2023) was a Puerto Rican reporter, journalist, and news anchor. He served as the news anchor of Informe 79 from Mega TV Puerto Rico. He formerly served as the news anchor for the show Las Noticias from Univision Puerto Rico before the Network abruptly canceled it on October 17, 2014.

Torres began his career in television in 1976. He worked for nine years at Telemundo, working alongside veteran reporter Aníbal González Irizarry. In 1986, he returned to Tele-Once where he served as news anchor of Las Noticias. In 2011, he and his daughter, reporter Layza Torres, joined Tu Mañana as news anchor, alongside Elwood Cruz. Torres was also the father of actor Xavier Enrique Torres. He later worked at WMTJ as anchor of Sistema TV Informa. In 2019, Torres returned to television along with his daughter Layza to work together on its local newscast Informe 79 on WTCV.

Torres received numerous awards for his work, like the Overseas Press Club, Agüeybana and Paoli Awards, among others. He also worked as a radio broadcaster.

On April 4, 2022, Torres was diagnosed with throat cancer. During July of that year, he was transported to New York, New York, for treatment. He died from the disease on December 13, 2023, at the age of 71.

== See also ==
- List of Puerto Ricans
