= Scotia Boyd =

British-Canadian makeup artist

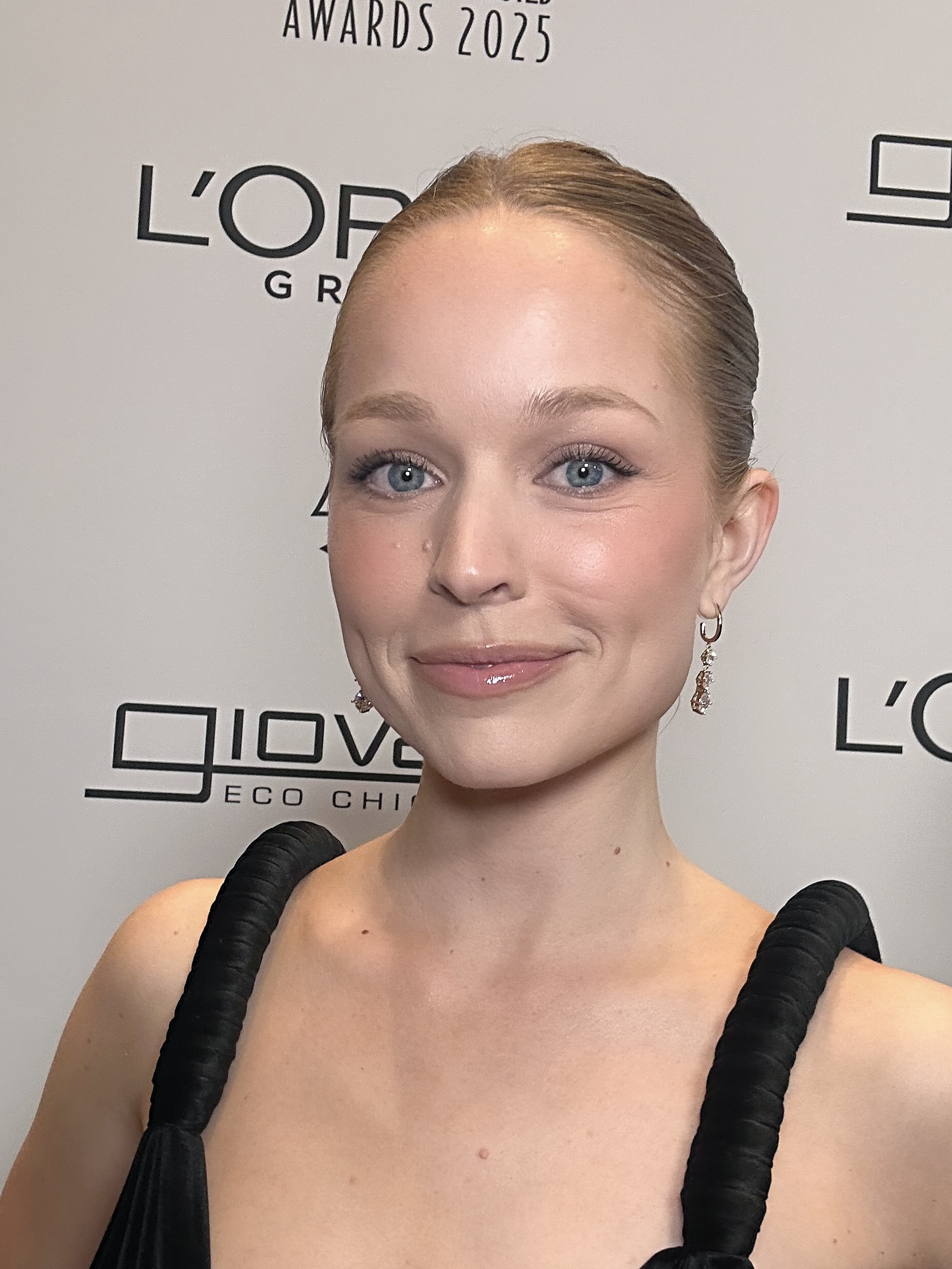
- Born: Sudbury, Ontario, Canada
- Occupation: Make-up artist
- Years active: 2014-present

Scotia Boyd is a British-Canadian makeup artist known for her work in film and television.

== Life and career ==
Boyd was born in Sudbury, Ontario, and studied makeup for media and prosthetics at Sheridan College. She began her career in Northern Ontario with projects like Cardinal (CTV) and Letterkenny (Bell Media). She later worked on Jupiter's Legacy (Netflix), Titans (Warner Bros.), and Star Trek: Strange New Worlds (CBS/Paramount+), with roles from assistant to key makeup artist. She is the founder of Scotia Boyd Makeup Artist Inc.

Boyd won the Make-Up Artists and Hair Stylists Guild Award in a Commercial or Music Video for the Secret – "Beetlejuice Beetlejuice: Lifesaver" commercial. She is a member of IATSE Local 706 (Los Angeles) and IATSE Local 873 (Toronto).

== Selected filmography ==
- The Boys (2024)
- Spaceman (2024)
- Culprits (2023)
- Star Trek: Strange New Worlds (2023)
- The Horror of Dolores Roach (2023)
- The Lost Symbol (2021)
- Titans (2019–2021)
- Jupiter's Legacy (2021)
- Secret Society of Second-Born Royals (2020)
- In the Dark (2019)
- American Hangman (2019)
- A Simple Favor (2018)
- Impulse (2018)
- Letterkenny (2016–2017)
