= Mykal-Michelle Harris =

American actress

- Born: Delran Township, New Jersey, U.S.
- Occupation: Actress
- Years active: 2016–present

Mykal-Michelle Harris is an American actress. She is best known for playing Santamonica Johnson in Mixed-ish, Alice Baxter in Raven's Home and the title character in Ariel.

== Early life ==
Harris was born in Delran Township, New Jersey. She was a straight A student at school. Her mother Kimberly helps her with her acting career.

== Career ==
Harris's first big role of her career was playing Santamonica Johnson in the sitcom Mixed-ish. She then starred as Luna in the Cheaper by the Dozen reboot opposite of Leo Abelo Perry who portrayed Luna's fraternal twin brother Luca.

In 2023, Harris was cast as Alice Baxter, the niece of Raven in the family sitcom Raven's Home starting in season five. She has voiced Ariel in Ariel as well as Ariel: Mermaid Tales and Ariel in the Little Mermaid: Songs from the Crystal Cavern.

== Personal life ==
She is currently living with her mother in Santa Clarita, California. Her personal decorative choice often includes unicorns. She is a keen collector of dolls and is a spokesperson for the L.O.L Surprise, Num Noms, and Moj Moj brands from MGA Entertainment.

== Filmography ==
=== Film ===
Year	Title	Role	Notes
2016	The Gospel	Sade	Short film
2017	I Love You Jocelyn	Jo Lovely	Voice role; Short film
2017	Bikini Moon	Ashley	
2017	Violets	Anna	Short film
2018	The Karma Club	Young Wendy	
2018	First Christmas	Charlotte	Short film
2019	CODA	Alex	Short film
2020	Mariah Carey's Magical Christmas Special	Little Mimi	
2022	Cheaper by the Dozen	Luna Baker	
2026	Toy Story 5	Blaze Manoukian	Voice role

=== Television ===
Year	Title	Role	Notes
2017	The Substitute	Mia	2 episodes
2018	STEM Jr. by Little Tikes	Host	2 episodes
2019	Big Little Lies	Young Bonnie Carlson	Recurring role (season 2)
2019	The Affair	Madeline	Recurring role
2019–2021	Mixed-ish	Santamonica Johnson	Main role
2021	The Kids Tonight Show	Herself	Main role
2021–2023	Summer Camp Island	Lem Mongello	Voice role; Recurring role (season 5–6)
2022–2023	Raven's Home	Alice Baxter	Main role (season 5–6)
2022–2023	Ada Twist, Scientist	London (voice)	Recurring role (season 3–4)
2023	Duck & Goose	Radio Star (voice)	Episode: "Thistle's Beach/Skunk"
2024	Ariel: Mermaid Tales	Ariel (voice)	Main role
2024–present	Ariel	Ariel (voice)	Main role
2024	Disney Animals	Ariel (voice)	Episode: "Disney Animals: Under The Sea With Ariel: Whale Sharks"
2024	Wizards Beyond Waverly Place	Nerissa	Episode: "Ain't Gnome Party Like a Wizard Party"
2025	Meet Iron Man and His Awesome Friends	Riri Williams / Ironheart (voice)	3 shorts
2025	Ariel – The Little Mermaid: Songs from the Crystal Cavern	Ariel	Voice role; Main role
2025	Vampirina: Teenage Vampire	Ruby	Episode: "First Halloween"
2026	I Love You, Jocelyn	Jocelyn	Voice role; Main role
2027	Oswald	Jen	Main role; Upcoming series
