= Jody Margolin Hahn =

American television director

- Born: November 18, 1962 (age 63); Larkspur, California, U.S.
- Other name: Jody Margolin
- Occupation: Television director
- Years active: 1986–present

Jody Margolin Hahn (née Margolin) (born November 18, 1962) is an American television director.

== Early life ==
Hahn was born in Larkspur, California, on November 18, 1962, to Frederick and Myrna Margolin. Her father, who died of ALS on May 10, 2012, worked as the founder and medical director of the Breast Health Center at the University of California, San Francisco from 1984 to 2007, and his many awards and honors include Fellow of the American College of Radiology and Fellow of the Society of Breast Imaging. In 2001, he was selected one of America's Best Doctors for Breast Care. Hahn's mother was a homemaker. She has a brother, Lawrence Harry Margolin, and a sister, Elizabeth Brett Garon. Her family is Jewish.

== Career ==
Hahn is best known for her work in comedies, having directed episodes for shows including Malcolm & Eddie, Hannah Montana, The Return of Jezebel James, Rita Rocks, Wizards of Waverly Place, Lab Rats, Mighty Med, The Fresh Beat Band, Nicky, Ricky, Dicky & Dawn, Bella and the Bulldogs, Dog with a Blog, Liv and Maddie, I Didn't Do It, Bizaardvark, Bunk'd, Coop & Cami Ask the World, Sydney to the Max, Pretty Freekin Scary, Knight Squad, Side Hustle, Erin & Aaron, Cousins for Life, That Girl Lay Lay, The Thundermans, The Villains of Valley View, Wizards Beyond Waverly Place, Electric Bloom, Vampirina: Teenage Vampire, The Conners, Lopez vs Lopez, and See Dad Run. Prior to television directing, Hahn worked as an associate director, production associate, script supervisor, and technical coordinator on the sitcoms Gimme a Break!, Roseanne, The Nanny and Accidentally on Purpose.

== Personal life ==
Hahn lives in Woodland Hills, California, with her husband, Miles Hahn. They have two sons.
