= Robbie Countryman =

American television director

- Born: Robert Countryman; January 27, 1965 (age 61); Los Angeles, California, U.S.
- Occupation: Television director
- Years active: 1991–present

Robert Countryman (born January 27, 1965) is an American television director.

Countryman began his career as a stage manager on the sitcom Growing Pains. His other stage managing credits include Martin, Hangin' with Mr. Cooper and So Little Time. While working on Mr. Cooper, he also became an assistant director, working on shows such as Suddenly Susan, Women's Murder Club, The Unit, Brothers and Melissa & Joey.

In 2004, Countryman made his professional directorial debut on Reba. He has since gone on to direct episodes of other series, including Just Jordan, Surviving Suburbia, The Wannabes, Wizards of Waverly Place, Crash & Bernstein, Pair of Kings, Let's Stay Together, Reed Between the Lines, See Dad Run, The Haunted Hathaways, K.C. Undercover, Best Friends Whenever, The Thundermans, Nicky, Ricky, Dicky & Dawn, Bunk'd, Bizaardvark, Raven's Home, Knight Squad, Cousins for Life, Coop & Cami Ask the World, Sydney to the Max, Just Roll with It, The Villains of Valley View, Erin & Aaron, Pretty Freekin Scary, Wizards Beyond Waverly Place, Electric Bloom, Vampirina: Teenage Vampire, The Ms. Pat Show, and Lopez vs Lopez.

Countryman is a graduate of University of Southern California with a bachelor's degree in Communications.

== Filmography ==
Year	Title	Role	Note(s)
1991–1992	Growing Pains	Stage Manager	23 episodes
1992	Martin	Stage Manager	2 episodes
1992–1997	Hangin' with Mr. Cooper	Stage Manager/First Assistant Director/Second Assistant Director	107 episodes
1993	Living Single	Stage Manager	Episode: "Judging by the Cover"
1998	Costello	First Assistant Director	Episode: "Pilot"
1999–2000	Odd Man Out	First Assistant Director	12 episodes
1999–2000	Suddenly Susan	Second Assistant Director/First Assistant Director	2 episodes
2001	The Krew	First Assistant Director	Short
2001–2007	Reba	First Assistant Director/Stage Manager/Director	178 episodes
2002	So Little Time	Stage Manager	Episode: "Larrypalooza"
2007	The Unit	Second Assistant Director	Episode: "Pandemonium: Part Two"
2007–2008	Women's Murder Club	Additional Second Assistant Director	
2007	Just Jordan	Director	Episode: "Revenge of the Riff"
2009	Surviving Suburbia	First Assistant Director/Director	3 episodes
2009	Brothers	First Assistant Director/Second Assistant Director	12 episodes
2010	The Wannabes Starring Savvy	Director	13 episodes
2010–2011	Wizards of Waverly Place	Director	4 episodes
2010–2015	Melissa & Joey	First Assistant Director/Director	72 episodes
2011–2012	Pair of Kings	Director	5 episodes
2011	Reed Between the Lines	Director	2 episodes
2012–2014	Let's Stay Together	Director	11 episodes
2012	The First Family	Director	Episode: "The First Report Card"
2012	Mr. Box Office	Director	Episode: "Somebody's Watching Me"
2012	Crash & Bernstein	Director	2 episodes
2012–2013	Mailbu County	First Assistant Director/Director	15 episodes
2013	Baby Daddy	Director	Episode: "There's Something Fitchy Going On"
2013–2018	The Thundermans	Director	15 episodes
2014	See Dad Run	Director	Episode: "See Dad Run Into Marcus' Nephew"
2014	Young & Hungry	Director	Episode: "Young & Pregnant"
2014–2021	Last Man Standing	Director	10 episodes
2015	Ground Floor	Director	Episode: "Wicked Wedding"
2015–2018	Nicky, Ricky, Dicky & Dawn	Director	12 episodes
2015	The Haunted Hathaways	Director	2 episodes
2015	Cristela	Director	2 episodes
2016	Best Friends Whenever	Director	Episode: "A Time to Double Date"
2016	Gamer's Guide to Pretty Much Everything	Director	3 episodes
2016–2018	K.C. Undercover	Director	10 episodes
2016–2023	Bunk'd	Director	9 episodes
2016–2019	Bizaardvark	Director	9 episodes
2017–2018	Marlon	Director	6 episodes
2017–2023	Raven's Home	Director	7 episodes
2017	Superior Donuts	Director	Episode: "Error of Admission"
2018–2019	Knight Squad	Director	5 episodes
2018	The Cool Kids	Director	Episode: "A Date with Destiny"
2018–2019	Coop & Cami Ask the World	Director	6 episodes
2019	Cousins for Life	Director	5 episodes
2019–2021	Sydney to the Max	Director	7 episodes
2019	Team Kaylie	Director	3 episodes
2019–2021	Family Reunion	Director	5 episodes
2019–2021	Just Roll with It	Director	7 episodes
2019	No Good Nick	Director	2 episodes
2019	All That	Director	Episode: "1113"
2019	A Family Reunion Christmas	Director	TV special
2021–2025	The Upshaws	Director	12 episodes
2021–2022	Dynasty	Director	2 episodes
2021–2026	The Conners	Director	18 episodes
2021	Gabby Duran & the Unsittables	Director	Episode: "Magic Hours"
2022–2026	The Neighborhood	Director	12 episodes
2022–2023	The Villains of Valley View	Director	2 episodes
2022	Lopez vs Lopez	Director	Episode: "Lopez vs. Gaslighting"
2023	Night Court	Director	Episode: "Ready or Knot"
2023	Saturdays	Director	2 episodes
2023	Erin & Aaron	Director	Episode: "Pictures of You"
2025	Happy's Place	Director	Episode: "Heart of the Matter"
2025	Wizards Beyond Waverly Place	Director	3 episodes
2025	Electric Bloom	Director	2 episodes
2025	Crutch	Director	Episode: "Community Church"
2025–2026	Vampirina: Teenage Vampire	Director	3 episodes
2026	The Varnell Hill Show	Director	4 episodes
