= Make-Up Artists & Hair Stylists Guild Award for Best Hair Styling in Children and Teen Programming =

Make-Up Artists and Hair Stylists Guild Award for Best Hair Styling in Children and Teen Programming
- Country: United States
- Presented by: Make-Up Artists and Hair Stylists Guild (MUAHS)
- First award: 2015
- Currently held by: Julie McHaffie, Diane Holme; A Series of Unfortunate Events (2018)
- Website: Make-Up Artists & Hair Stylists Guild

The Make-Up Artists and Hair Stylists Guild Award for Best Hair Styling in Children and Teen Programming is one of the awards given annually to people working in the television industry by the Make-Up Artists and Hair Stylists Guild (MUAHS). It is presented to hair stylists who work in television, whose work has been deemed "best" in a given year. It was first given in 2015.

== Winners and nominees ==
=== 2010s ===
Year	Program	Nominees	Network
(2015); 8th
(2015); 8th	Henry Danger	Joe Matke, Roma Goddard	Nickelodeon
(2015); 8th	Gamer's Guide to Mastering Junior High	Jani Kleinbard, Stephanie Lierman	Disney XD
(2015); 8th	Game Shakers	Joe Matke, Roma Goddard	Nickelodeon
(2015); 8th	Gortimer Gibbon's Life on Normal Street	Josie Peng	Amazon Prime Video
(2016); 9th
(2016); 9th	So You Think You Can Dance: The Next Generation	Dean Banowetz, Cory Rotenberg, Kim Messina	Fox
(2016); 9th	An American Girl Story – Maryellen 1955: Extraordinary Christmas	Josie Peng, Jennie Lechleidner	Amazon Prime Video
(2016); 9th	Gortimer Gibbon's Life on Normal Street	Josie Peng, Bia Iftikhar	Amazon Prime Video
(2016); 9th	Henry Danger	Joe Matke, Roma Goddard, Dwayne Ross	Nickelodeon
(2016); 9th	Walk the Prank	Ursula Hawks, Mary Howd	Disney XD
(2017); 10th
(2017); 10th	Henry Danger	Joe Matke, Roma Goddard, Dwayne Ross	Nickelodeon
(2017); 10th	An American Girl Story – Ivy & Julie 1976: A Happy Balance	Josie Peng, Jennie Lechleidner	Amazon Prime Video
(2017); 10th	Just Add Magic	Gabby Suarez, Desiree Ponce	Amazon Prime Video
(2017); 10th	The Thundermans	Jani Kleinbard, Janet Moore	Nickelodeon
(2017); 10th	Walk the Prank	Ursula Hawks, Mary Howd	Disney XD
(2018); 11th
(2018); 11th	A Series of Unfortunate Events	Julie McHaffie, Diane Holme	Netflix
(2018); 11th	Dancing with the Stars: Juniors	Kim Messina, Cheryl Eckert, Kim M. Ferry	ABC
(2018); 11th	Henry Danger	Joe Matke, Roma Goddard, Dwayne Ross	Nickelodeon
(2018); 11th	Lip Sync Battle Shorties	Jerilynn Straitiff, Kathleen Leonard, Romy Fleming	Nickelodeon
(2018); 11th	Sesame Street	Jackie Payne	HBO
(2018); 11th	Walk the Prank	Ursula Hawks, Michelle Nyree	Disney XD
(2019); 12th
(2019); 12th	A Series of Unfortunate Events	Julie McHaffie, Diane Holme	Netflix
(2019); 12th	All That	Joe Matke, Dwayne Ross, Roma Goddard	Nickelodeon
(2019); 12th	Lip Sync Battle Shorties	Jerilynn Straitiff, Kathleen Leonard, Cory Rotenberg	Nickelodeon
(2019); 12th	Fuller House	Anna Maria Orzano, Sandra Rubin-Munk	Netflix
(2019); 12th	Malibu Rescue	Pavy Olivarez, Monique Hyman, Laura Caponera	Netflix

=== 2020s ===
Year	Program	Nominees	Network
(2020); 13th
(2020); 13th	All That	Joe Matke, Dwayne Ross, Theresa Broadnax	Nickelodeon
(2020); 13th	The Baby-Sitters Club	Florence Cepeda, Sasha Carnovale	Netflix
(2020); 13th	Danger Force	Joe Matke, Roma Goddard, Yunea Cruz	Nickelodeon
(2020); 13th	Ghostwriter	Liz Roelands	Apple TV+
(2020); 13th	Sesame Street	Jacqueline Payne	HBO Max
(2021); 14th
(2021); 14th	Danger Force	Joe Matke, Roma Goddard, Yunea Cruz	Nickelodeon
(2021); 14th	The Baby-Sitters Club	Florencia Cepeda, Miranda Upton, Alana Olson	Netflix
(2021); 14th	Family Reunion	Melanie Ervin, Lindsay Rogers	Netflix
(2021); 14th	Sesame Street	Rob Greene	HBO Max
(2021); 14th	Head of the Class	Patricia Pineda, Rachel Bench, Dwayne Ross	HBO Max
(2022); 15th
(2022); 15th	The Quest	Elle Favorule, Michelle Sfarzo, Sonia Cabrera	Disney+
(2022); 15th	Danger Force	Joe Matke, Roma Goddard, Yunea Cruz, Danyell Lynn Weinberg	Nickelodeon
(2022); 15th	That Girl Lay Lay	Dwayne Ross, Kari Williams, Lauren Kinermon	Nickelodeon
(2022); 15th	The Fairly OddParents: Fairly Odder	Joe Matke, Melanie Verkins, Justin Jackson, Jennifer Green	Paramount+
(2022); 15th	Raven's Home	Dwayne Ross, Tamara Tripp, Lauren Kinermon	Disney Channel
