= Mimi Gianopulos =

American actress

- Born: May 12, 1989 (age 37); Los Angeles, California, U.S.
- Education: Carnegie Mellon University (BFA)
- Occupation: Actress
- Years active: 2007–present
- Spouse: Brett Ryland (m. 2022)
- Father: Jim Gianopulos

Mimi Gianopulos (born May 12, 1989) is an American actress. She is best known for her supporting role as Molly in the 2012 film What to Expect When You're Expecting. She starred as Giada Russo in the Disney Channel sitcom Wizards Beyond Waverly Place (2024–2026).

== Career ==
Gianopulos' first screen acting role was in the 2007 film Moondance Alexander, starring Kay Panabaker and Don Johnson. In 2013, she starred in the titular role in the unsold ABC Family sitcom pilot Continuing Fred. Also in 2013, she was cast in the film Get a Job, also starring Anna Kendrick and Miles Teller. Gianopulos also had a recurring role as Angela on the ABC Family sitcom Baby Daddy. In 2024, it was announced that Gianopulos had been cast in a series regular role as Giada Russo, Justin Russo's mortal wife, in the Disney Channel sitcom Wizards Beyond Waverly Place.

== Personal life ==
Gianopulos is of Greek descent. She is the daughter of film executive Jim Gianopulos, and has two younger sisters, Alexa and Niki.

== Filmography ==
Film
Year	Title	Role	Notes
2007	Moondance Alexander	Bella	
2010	To Be Determined	Mary	Short film
2012	What to Expect When You're Expecting	Molly	
2013	The Wine of Summer	Nina	
2014	The Best Friend	Ellen	Short film
2015	The Wedding Ringer	Mimi	Uncredited
2015	Lily & Kat	Agatha	
2016	Get a Job	Cammy	
2019	The Knight Before Christmas	Alyson	

Television
Year	Title	Role	Notes
2013	Continuing Fred	Winifred "Fred" Harris	Unsold TV pilot
2013–2016	Baby Daddy	Angela	Recurring role
2021	Rutherford Falls	Kaitlyn	Recurring role
2022	The Offer	Sue Mengers	Guest role
2024–2026	Wizards Beyond Waverly Place	Giada Russo	Main role
