= Xavier Enrique Torres =

Puerto Rican actor

- Born: San Juan, Puerto Rico
- Occupation: Actor
- Years active: 2006–present

Xavier Enrique Torres is a Puerto Rican actor, born in San Juan. He is the son of journalist and news anchor Ramón Enrique Torres, and brother of journalist Layza Torres.

In 2006, he got his first opportunity to enter the American mainland market with a starring role in the Lifetime Television Network film Break In. In the film, he plays “Angel”, a young thief who kidnaps a group of tourists who were on vacation in the Caribbean. Torres then obtained a part in the acclaimed HBO original series Entourage, becoming the second Latin actor to take part in the show. Here, he played the role of “Javier Gracho”, a dreamy soap opera actor who has a romantic scene with “Mrs. Ari”, Emmy and Golden Globe Award winner Jeremy Piven's onscreen wife interpreted by Perry Reeves.

He has also appeared in the Disney Channel Original Movie Wizards of Waverly Place: The Movie playing Javier, a windsurfing instructor who is interested in Alex while she's on vacation with her family in the Caribbean.
