= Make-Up Artists & Hair Stylists Guild Award for Best Makeup in Children and Teen Programming =

Make-Up Artists and Hair Stylists Guild Award for Best Makeup in Children and Teen Programming
- Country: United States
- Presented by: Make-Up Artists and Hair Stylists Guild (MUAHS)
- First award: 2015
- Currently held by: Michael Johnston, Brad Look, Kevin Westmore, Tyson Fountaine; Danger Force (2021)
- Website: Make-Up Artists & Hair Stylists Guild

The Make-Up Artists and Hair Stylists Guild Award for Best Makeup in Children and Teen Programming is one of the awards given annually to people working in the television industry by the Make-Up Artists and Hair Stylists Guild (MUAHS). It is presented to makeup artists who work in television, whose work has been deemed "best" in a given year. It was first given in 2015.

== Winners and nominees ==
=== 2010s ===
Year	Program	Nominees	Network
(2015); 8th
(2015); 8th	Henry Danger	Michael Johnston, Patti Brand	Nickelodeon
(2015); 8th	Gamer's Guide to Pretty Much Everything	Annie Maniscalco, Molly Craytor	Disney XD
(2015); 8th	Game Shakers	Michael Johnston, Patti Brand	Nickelodeon
(2015); 8th	Gortimer Gibbon's Life on Normal Street	Julie Murray, Carleigh Herbert	Amazon
(2015); 8th	Liv and Maddie	Danielle Lyn Saunders, Kim Perrodin	Disney Channel
(2016); 9th
(2016); 9th	So You Think You Can Dance: The Next Generation	Tonia Green, Danielle Rush	Fox
(2016); 9th	An American Girl Story – Maryellen 1955: Extraordinary Christmas	Julie Murray, Laura Peyer	Amazon
(2016); 9th	Henry Danger	Michael Johnston, Patti Brand, Melanie Mills	Nickelodeon
(2016); 9th	The Thundermans	Michelle Keck, Todd Tucker, Martin Astles	Nickelodeon
(2016); 9th	Walk the Prank	Jennifer Aspinall, Ned Neidhardt	Disney XD
(2017); 10th
(2017); 10th	Henry Danger	Michael Johnston, Patti Brand, Melanie Mills	Nickelodeon
(2017); 10th	Anne with an E	Diane Mazur, Larissa Palaszczuk	Netflix
(2017); 10th	Just Add Magic	Myriam Arougheti, Merry Lee Traum	Amazon
(2017); 10th	The Thundermans	Michelle Keck, Chelsea Jolton	Nickelodeon
(2017); 10th	Walk the Prank	Jennifer Aspinall, Ned Neidhardt	Disney XD
(2018); 11th
(2018); 11th	A Series of Unfortunate Events	Rita Ciccozzi, Krista Seller, Bill Terezakis	Netflix
(2018); 11th	Dancing with the Stars: Juniors	Zena Shteysel, Angela Moos, Patti Ramsey Bortoli	ABC
(2018); 11th	Henry Danger	Michael Johnston, Patti Brand, Melanie Mills	Nickelodeon
(2018); 11th	Sesame Street	Jane DiPersio	HBO
(2018); 11th	Walk the Prank	Jennifer Aspinall, Ned Neidhardt	Disney XD
(2019); 12th
(2019); 12th	A Series of Unfortunate Events	Rita Ciccozzi, Tanya Hudson, Krista Seller	Netflix
(2019); 12th	All That	Michael Johnston, Melanie Mills, Allan A. Apone	Nickelodeon
(2019); 12th	Henry Danger	Michael Johnston, Patti Brand, Brad Look	Nickelodeon
(2019); 12th	Just Add Magic	Myriam Arougheti, Merry Lee Traum	Amazon
(2019); 12th	No Good Nick	Myriam Arougheti, Merry Lee Traum, Jacklynn Evans	Netflix

=== 2020s ===
Year	Program	Nominees	Network
(2020); 13th
(2020); 13th	All That	Michael Johnston, Melanie Mills, Tyson Fountaine, Nadege Schoenfeld	Nickelodeon
(2020); 13th	The Baby-Sitters Club	Zabrina Matiru, Darah Wyant, Lindsey Pilkey	Netflix
(2020); 13th	Danger Force	Michael Johnston, Brad Look, Kevin Westmore, Tyson Fountaine	Nickelodeon
(2020); 13th	Henry Danger	Michael Johnston, Brad Look, Kevin Westmore, Robert Maverick	Nickelodeon
(2020); 13th	Sesame Street	Jane DiPersio	HBO
(2021); 14th
(2021); 14th	Danger Force	Michael Johnston, Brad Look, Kevin Westmore, Tyson Fountaine	Nickelodeon
(2021); 14th	The Baby-Sitters Club	Ceilidh Dunn, Ciara Lynch, Ashley Pilkey	Netflix
(2021); 14th	Family Reunion	Kym Nicole Oubre, Starlynn Burden, Julianne Kaye	Netflix
(2021); 14th	Head of the Class	Linda Choi, Alexis Walker, Olivia Fischa, Joely Upchurch Gonez	HBO Max
(2021); 14th	Sesame Street	Jane DiPersio, Chris Bingham	HBO Max
(2022); 15th
(2022); 15th	The Quest	Elle Favorule, Michelle Sfarzo, Sonia Cabrera	Disney+
(2022); 15th	Danger Force	Michael Johnston, Bradley Look, Kevin Westmore, Tyson Fountaine	Nickelodeon
(2022); 15th	The Fairly OddParents: Fairly Odder	Michael Johnston, Julie Hassett, Gerardo Avila, Tyson Fountaine	Paramount+
(2022); 15th	High School Musical: The Musical: The Series	Kimberly Collea, James Cool Benson, Maryann Marchetti	Disney+
(2022); 15th	The Really Loud House	Sierra Barton, Alisha Baijounas	Nickelodeon
