= Danger Force =

American superherobcomedy television series

- Genre: Comedy; Superhero
- Created by: Christopher J. Nowak (Note: Christopher J. Nowak is credited as the series creator for the first five episodes, while Dan Schneider and Dana Olsen are the credited creators for the rest of the series.); Dan Schneider & Dana Olsen
- Developed by: Christopher J. Nowak
- Starring: Cooper Barnes; Michael D. Cohen; Havan Flores; Terrence Little Gardenhigh; Dana Heath; Luca Luhan
- Theme music composer: "Danger Force Theme" by Zack Hexum & Niki Hexum & Samantha Martin
- Composers: Zack Hexum & Niki Hexum
- Country of origin: United States
- Original language: English
- No. of seasons: 3
- No. of episodes: 63 (list of episodes)

Production
- Executive producers: Christopher J. Nowak; Jake Farrow; Cooper Barnes
- Producers: Andrew Hirsch; Andrew Thomas; Jessica Poter; Jace Norman; Jimmy Brooks
- Cinematography: Michael Spodnik
- Camera setup: Multi-camera
- Running time: 23 minutes
- Production company: Nickelodeon Productions

Original release
- Network: Nickelodeon
- Release: March 28, 2020 – February 21, 2024

Related
- Henry Danger

Danger Force is an American superhero comedy television series developed by Christopher J. Nowak that premiered on Nickelodeon on March 28, 2020. It lasted three seasons, with the final episode airing on February 21, 2024. The series is a spinoff of Henry Danger and includes returning stars Cooper Barnes and Michael D. Cohen. Starring alongside them are Havan Flores, Terrence Little Gardenhigh, Dana Heath, and Luca Luhan.

== Premise ==
Captain Man and Schwoz recruit Chapa, Miles, Mika, and Bose, four new superheroes-in-training, to attend Swellview Academy for the Gifted in order to train them into being superheroes.

== Cast and characters ==
- Cooper Barnes as Ray / Captain Man, Swellview's resident superhero who is indestructible and is training the Danger Force to be superheroes. His full name is revealed to be Raymond Esther Manchester in "Test Friends".
- Michael D. Cohen as Schwoz, an inventor who provides Captain Man and Danger Force with different inventions to help them on their missions
- Havan Flores as Chapa, a girl who gains the ability of electrokinesis, whose superhero name is Volt. Her full name is revealed to be Lula Elena Chapa De Silva in "Unmasked".
- Terrence Little Gardenhigh as Miles, the brother of Mika who develops the power of teleportation and whose superhero name is AWOL. His last name is revealed to be Macklin in "Mika in the Middle".
- Dana Heath as Mika, the sister of Miles who develops the ability of sonic scream and whose superhero name is ShoutOut. Her last name is revealed to be Macklin in "Mika in the Middle".
- Luca Luhan as Bose, the ditzy stepson of Vice-Mayor Willard who gains the power of telekinesis and whose superhero name is Brainstorm. His last name is revealed to be O'Brian in "Radioactive Cat".

== Production ==
On February 19, 2020, it was announced that a Henry Danger spinoff, Danger Force would premiere on March 28, 2020. The spinoff series sees the return of Cooper Barnes as Ray / Captain Man and Michael D. Cohen as Schwoz. The series was given an initial order of 13 episodes. In addition, Havan Flores as Chapa, Terrence Little Gardenhigh as Miles, Dana Heath as Mika, and Luca Luhan as Bose also star in the series. Based on characters created by Dan Schneider and Dana Olsen, the series was developed by Christopher J. Nowak who also serves as executive producer. Cooper Barnes and Jace Norman serve as producers for the series. Omar Camacho serves as executive producer. A quarantine episode, filmed and produced virtually, aired on May 9, 2020. On August 4, 2020, it was announced that a five-episode series of remotely produced "minisodes" would premiere on August 8, 2020. On March 18, 2021, the series was renewed for a second season of 26 episodes, which premiered on October 23, 2021. On August 25, 2022, the series was renewed for a third season of 13 episodes, which premiered on April 20, 2023, and ended on February 21, 2024.

== Episodes ==
| Season | Episodes | Originally released | |
| Season | Episodes | First released | Last released |
|---|---|---|---|
| 1 | 26 | March 28, 2020 | July 17, 2021 |
| 2 | 25 | October 23, 2021 | July 7, 2022 |
| 3 | 12 | April 20, 2023 | February 21, 2024 |

== Reception ==
=== Critical response ===
Melissa Camacho of Common Sense Media rated the series a 2 out of 5 stars, stating that "this colorful and silly live-action comedy offers the same cheese humor as the show it was spun from."

=== Ratings ===
Viewership and ratings per season of Danger Force
| Season | Episodes | First aired | | Last aired | | Avg. viewers (millions) |
| Season | Episodes | Date | Viewers (millions) | Date | Viewers (millions) | Avg. viewers (millions) |
|---|---|---|---|---|---|---|
| 1 | 26 | March 28, 2020 | 0.89 | July 17, 2021 | 0.30 | 0.51 |
| 2 | 25 | October 23, 2021 | 0.38 | July 7, 2022 | 0.22 | 0.32 |
| 3 | 11 | April 20, 2023 | 0.15 | February 21, 2024 | TBD | 0.15 |

=== Awards and nominations ===
| Year | Award | Category | Nominee(s) | Result | Refs |
|---|---|---|---|---|---|
| 2021 | Kids' Choice Awards | Favorite Kids' TV Show | Danger Force | Nominated | |
| 2022 | GLAAD Media Awards | Outstanding Kids & Family Programming | Danger Force | Nominated | |
| 2022 | Kids' Choice Awards | Favorite Kids TV Show | Danger Force | Nominated | |
| 2022 | Children's and Family Emmy Awards | Outstanding Stunt Coordination for a Live Action Program | Vince Deadrick Jr. | Won | |
| 2022 | Children's and Family Emmy Awards | Outstanding Special Effects Costumes, Hair and Makeup | Various | Nominated | |
| 2023 | Children's and Family Emmy Awards | Outstanding Stunt Coordination for a Live Action Program | Vince Deadrick Jr. | Nominated | |
| 2024 | Kids' Choice Awards | Favorite Kids TV Show | Danger Force | Nominated | |
