= The Kissing Bandit =

The Kissing Bandit may refer to:

== Arts and entertainment ==
- The Kissing Bandit (film), a 1948 film starring Frank Sinatra and Kathryn Grayson
- Jojo the Kissing Bandit, a character in the Avatar: The Last Airbender trading card game
- An episode of The Love Boat

== People ==
- Adriano Belli (born 1977), defensive tackle in the Canadian Football League nicknamed "The Kissing Bandit" for his penchant for kissing people on the cheek
- Richard Dawson (1932–2012), actor and game show host nicknamed "The Kissing Bandit" for kissing female contestants while hosting Family Feud
- Morganna (born 1947), buxom entertainer nicknamed "The Kissing Bandit" for running onto baseball fields and kissing select baseball players throughout the 1970s and 1980s
- Edna Murray (1898–1966), criminal who got the nickname "Kissing Bandit" after kissing her victim during a robbery
- Peeter Pedaja (1931-1985), adventurer and sculptor, known as "The Real Life Kissing Bandit" in Australia after hijacking a motorcycle and committing armed robbery with a water pistol, then claiming to have been inspired by the Frank Sinatra film The Kissing Bandit.
- Valentine Phantom, nicknamed "The Kissing Bandit" for decorating the business district of Boulder, Colorado, United States, with red hearts on Valentine's Day
