= Kate Katzman =

American actress

- Born: January 1, 1985 (age 41); Philadelphia, Pennsylvania
- Occupation: Actress
- Years active: 2015–present

Kate Katzman (born January 1, 1985) is an American actress. She is best known for playing Simone in the action comedy film Old Guy and Sofia in the drama comedy film This Is the Year.

== Early life ==
Katzman was born in Philadelphia. She grew up in Bucks County, Pennsylvania. She started to model in high school and continued to do so until college. She initially wanted to be a veterinarian but caught the eye of acting legend Burt Reynolds who convinced her to try out at the Burt Reynolds Institute for Film and Theatre in Jupiter, Florida.

== Career ==
Katzman made her acting debut in the biographical drama film Walt Before Mickey where she portrayed Walts wife Lillian Disney. Her first big role came playing Megan Albert in the star studded crime comedy film The Comeback Trail alongside legends such as Robert De Niro and Morgan Freeman. She was awarded the Star on the Horizon award at the Fort Lauderdale International Film Festival She played Chloe in the thriller film Adverse starring Mickey Rourke. She played Sofia in comedy drama film This Is the Year which was director David Henries director debut.

== Personal life ==
She is married to Scott Katzman, a spine surgeon specialist. Together they have two children: a daughter, Keira, and a son, Dylan. They live in Palm Beach Gardens, Florida just one neighborhood away from her mother. Her favourite film is Breakfast at Tiffany's

== Filmography ==
=== Film ===
Year	Title	Role	Notes
2015	Walt Before Mickey	Lillian Disney	
2019	A Christmas Carol	Ellen Scrooge	Short
2019	Santa In Training	Dippy	
2020	Adverse	Chloe	
2020	This Is the Year	Sophie	
2020	The Comeback Trail	Megan Albert	
2021	Survive the Game	Purple	
2022	Panama (2022 film)	Tatyana	
2022	Hot Seat	Ava	
2022	Paradise City	Nikki	
2024	Old Guy	Simone	
