= Paul Blart: Mall Cop 2 =

2015 film by Andy Fickman

- Theatrical release poster
- Directed by: Andy Fickman
- Written by: Nick Bakay; Kevin James
- Based on: Characters by Kevin James; Nick Bakay
- Produced by: Todd Garner; Kevin James; Adam Sandler; Jack Giarraputo
- Starring: Kevin James; Raini Rodriguez; Neal McDonough; Shirley Knight; David Henrie
- Cinematography: Dean Semler
- Edited by: Scott Hill
- Music by: Rupert Gregson-Williams
- Production companies: Columbia Pictures; LStar Capital; Happy Madison Productions; Hey Eddie Productions; Broken Road Productions
- Distributed by: Sony Pictures Releasing
- Release date: April 17, 2015 (United States)
- Running time: 94 minutes
- Country: United States
- Language: English
- Budget: $30–40 million
- Box office: $107 million

Paul Blart: Mall Cop 2 is a 2015 American action comedy film directed by Andy Fickman and written by Kevin James and Nick Bakay. It is the sequel to 2009's Paul Blart: Mall Cop. In addition to James, Shirley Knight, Jayma Mays and Raini Rodriguez also reprise their roles with Gary Valentine playing a different character and Neal McDonough joining the cast. The film follows mall security guard Paul Blart (James), who is invited to a security officers' convention in Las Vegas and must stop a heist at the Wynn Las Vegas hotel.

Filming began in April 2014 at the Wynn Las Vegas casino resort. It was released the following year on April 17, 2015. Paul Blart: Mall Cop 2 was the first film shot at the resort. It was also the first film to receive Nevada's film tax credit, enacted in 2013, netting the production a $4.3 million return on expenditures. The film was panned by critics and grossed $107 million worldwide at the box office.

== Plot ==
Paul Blart has been enduring a series of misfortunes, including his wife Amy divorcing him six days into their marriage, and two years later, his mother is killed after being struck by a milk truck. To help regain his spirits, Paul takes pride in resuming his role as a security guard at the mall. Four years later, as Paul says he has "officially peaked", he receives an invitation to a security officers' convention in Las Vegas and begins to believe that his luck is about to change. His daughter, Maya, discovers that she was accepted into UCLA and plans to move across the country to Los Angeles, but in the wake of her father's invitation, she decides to withhold the information.

After arriving in Las Vegas, Paul and his daughter meet the general manager of the hotel, a pretty young woman named Divina Martinez, whom Paul is instantly attracted to. He later learns that she's dating the hotel's head of security, Eduardo Furtillo. Meanwhile, Maya falls in love with the hotel's valet, Lane. A security guard from the Mall of America attending the convention, Donna Ericone, is aware of Paul's earlier heroics at the West Orange Pavilion Mall incident and believes that Paul will be the likely keynote speaker at the event. However, Paul discovers that another security guard, Nick Panero, is giving the speech.

In the midst of the convention, a criminal named Vincent Sofel and a gang of accomplices disguised as hotel employees are secretly plotting to steal priceless works of art from the hotel and replace them with replicas, then sell the real ones at auction. In the meantime, Paul has become overprotective of Maya after discovering her flirting with Lane and spies on their conversations. He is later mocked by Eduardo for his lack of professionalism in an event where hotel security was notified when Maya is discovered missing. In an ensuing argument with her father, Maya becomes upset and claims she's attending UCLA despite Paul's wishes that she remain close to home at a junior college.

At the convention, Paul, Donna, and three other security guards, Saul Gundermutt, Khan Mubi, and Gino Chizetti check out the non-lethal security equipment on display. Paul finds Nick drunkenly attacking a woman at the bar. Paul attempts to defuse the situation and Nick passes out, giving Paul a chance to be the event's speaker. Later, Paul takes a break in The Garden of Contemplation, only to face off against a bird while a man playing piano watches. Following the speech, Paul learns that Maya and Lane have been taken hostage by Vincent and rushes to help, but abruptly collapses due to his hypoglycemia that has plagued him for years.

After recovering, Paul is able to defeat several of Vincent's thugs and gathers intel on the group's intentions. Using non-lethal equipment from the convention, he is able to defeat more of Vincent's crew. Meanwhile, Maya and Lane overhear Vincent adamantly refusing an oatmeal cookie due to a severe oatmeal allergy. Working with a team – Donna, Saul, Khan, and Gino – Paul is able to clumsily dismantle Vincent's operation, with Maya severely incapacitating Vincent by rubbing oatmeal-infused concealer on his face and Paul finishing Vincent off with an extremely forceful headbutt. Afterward, Paul convinces Divina to be with Eduardo. He also accepts Maya going to UCLA, funding her tuition with the reward he obtained from Steve Wynn for stopping Vincent. After dropping off Maya at UCLA, Paul falls for a mounted police officer who reciprocates his advances, but her horse reflexively kicks him into the side of a car.

== Cast ==
- Kevin James as Paul Blart
- Raini Rodriguez as Maya Blart
- Neal McDonough as Vincent Sofel
- David Henrie as Lane
- Daniella Alonso as Divina Martinez
- Loni Love as Donna Ericone
- D. B. Woodside as Robinson
- Eduardo Verástegui as Eduardo Furtillo
- Nicholas Turturro as Nick Panero
- Geovanni Gopradi as Ramos
- Lorenzo James Henrie as Lorenzo
- Chelsea Vincent as Nadia
- Vic DiBitetto as Gino Chizetti
- Gary Valentine as Saul Gundermutt
- Ana Gasteyer as Mrs. Gundermutt
- Shelly Desai as Khan Mubi
- Bas Rutten as Henk
- Lauren Ash as Mindy
- Jackie Sandler as Attractive Lady
- Jared Sandler as Jared
- Shirley Knight as Margaret Blart, Paul's mother and Maya's paternal grandmother
- Eric Genuis as Pianist
- Steve Wynn as himself
- Andrea Wynn as herself
- Max Alexander as "Big Sticky Mess" vendor (uncredited)

Jayma Mays was only seen in the opening scene because she couldn't reprise the role for the sequel.

== Production ==
=== Development ===
In January 2009, Sony expressed an interest in making a sequel to Paul Blart: Mall Cop. It was revealed on January 7, 2014, that Andy Fickman was in talks to direct the film while Kevin James, who also co-wrote the script with Nick Bakay, would be back to star as Blart. James produced the film along with Todd Garner and Happy Madison's Adam Sandler. The cast includes David Henrie, Raini Rodriguez, Eduardo Verástegui, Nicholas Turturro, Gary Valentine, Neal McDonough, Daniella Alonso, and D. B. Woodside, starring alongside James.

On March 14, 2014, the Nevada Film Office announced that Sony Pictures had been awarded the first certificate of eligibility for a new tax credit enacted in 2013, in regard to the filming of Paul Blart: Mall Cop 2. Nevada Film Office Director, Eric Preiss, indicated that the production would get $4.3 million in tax credits based on the proposal in their application. The film was initially greenlit with a $45–50 million production budget, but after Kevin James agreed to take a paycut, the final figure came in at around $38 million. On April 2, 2014, Columbia Pictures announced that the film would be released on April 17, 2015.

=== Filming ===
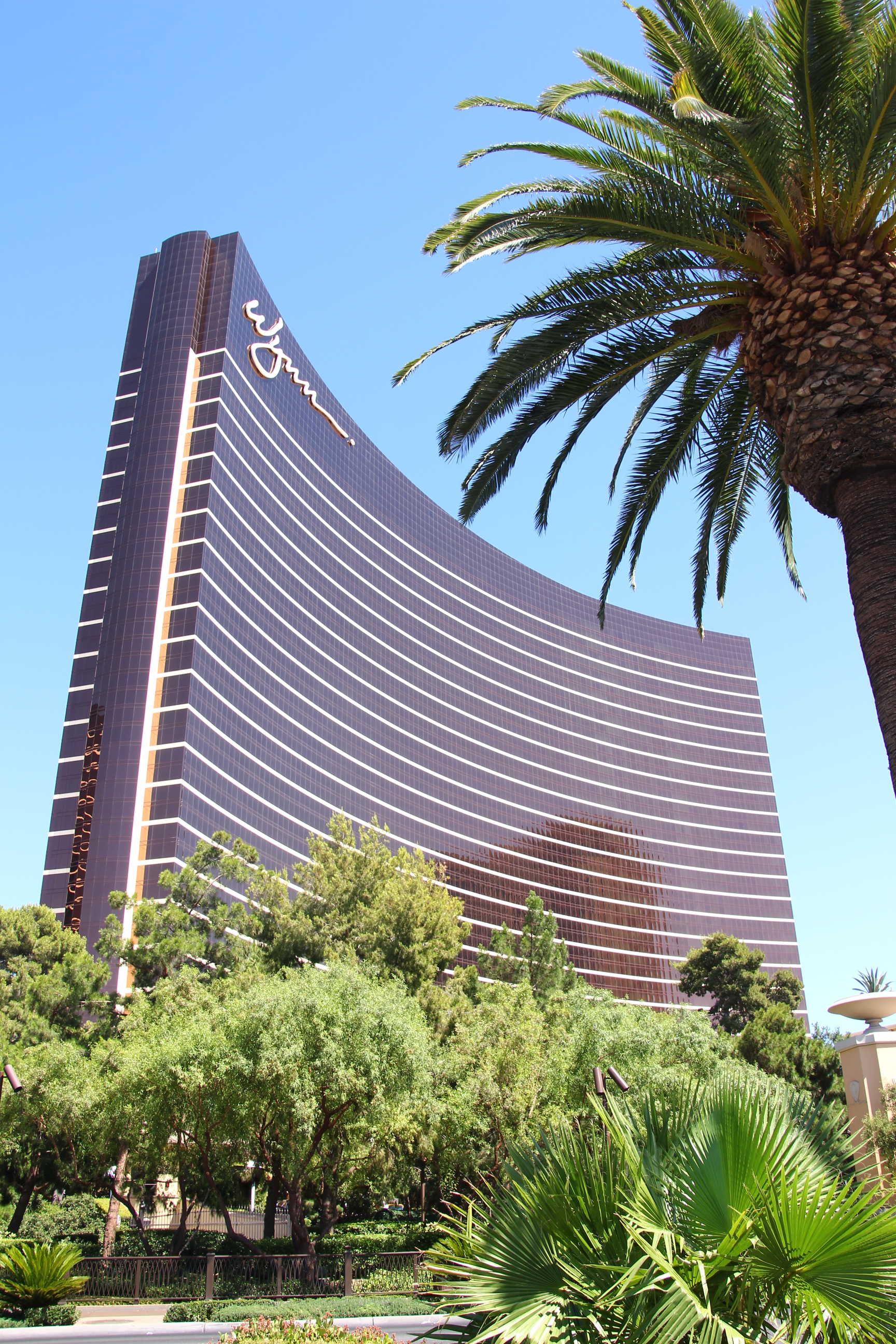
The Wynn building, where the entire film was shot

In an October 2012 interview, James said that he liked the idea of filming the sequel at the Mall of America. Principal photography commenced on April 21, 2014, at Wynn Las Vegas, and ended on June 26, 2014. It is the first time that Steve Wynn has allowed a commercial film to be shot at this property. A Wynn representative cited publicity for the resort, as well as "mutually beneficial circumstances" between the hotel and Sony Pictures as rationale for approving the project. For the only scene involving the West Orange Pavilion Mall (shown at the beginning of the film), the only exterior shot of the mall is deleted stock footage of the Burlington Mall taken from the first film, while all of the interior shots were filmed in Fashion Show Mall in Las Vegas.

== Release ==
Paul Blart: Mall Cop 2 was released by Columbia Pictures in the United States on April 17, 2015.

=== Home media ===
Paul Blart: Mall Cop 2 was released on DVD and Blu-ray on July 14, 2015, by Sony Pictures Home Entertainment.

== Reception ==
=== Box office ===
Paul Blart: Mall Cop 2 grossed $71 million in North America and $36.5 million in other territories for a worldwide total of $107.5 million, against a production budget of $38 million.

In its opening weekend, the film grossed $23.8 million, finishing second at the box office behind Furious 7 ($29.2 million).

=== Critical response ===
On the review aggregator website Rotten Tomatoes, 6% of 62 critics' reviews are positive, with an average rating of 3/10. The website's consensus reads: "Bathed in flop sweat and bereft of purpose, Paul Blart: Mall Cop 2 strings together fat-shaming humor and Segway sight gags with uniformly unfunny results." Metacritic, which uses a weighted average, assigned the film a score of 13 out of 100, based on 16 critics, indicating "overwhelming dislike". Audiences polled by CinemaScore gave the film an average grade of "B−" on an A+ to F scale, a step down from the first film's "B" grade.

Sara Stewart of the New York Post gave the film one out of four stars and wrote that the plot is "just an excuse for James to do his one trick over and over: Bluster, then screw up humiliatingly". Frank Scheck of The Hollywood Reporter wrote, "James tries hard, very hard, to inject the proceedings with slapstick humor, propelling his large body through endless physical contortions in a fruitless effort for laughs." Justin Chang of Variety called it a "tacky, numbingly inane sequel".

In rating the film zero stars, Christy Lemire of RogerEbert.com wrote, "Truly, there is not a single redeeming moment in director Andy Fickman's film. A general flatness and lethargy permeate these reheated proceedings." Kevin P. Sullivan of Entertainment Weekly gave the film a D and called it "far from the worst movie that you'll ever see", though he wondered why people would bother watching it. Peter Howell of the Toronto Star gave the film a half a star out of four, saying: "Caddyshack 2. Exorcist 2. Speed 2. To this small sample of the ever-expanding list of wretched movie sequels, add Paul Blart: Mall Cop 2, a gobsmackingly witless excuse for entertainment." Andy Webster of The New York Times described the film as inoffensive but familiar.

=== Legacy ===
In 2015, Tim Batt and Guy Montgomery (hosts of The Worst Idea of All Time) formed a podcast called 'Til Death Do Us Blart with Justin McElroy, Travis McElroy, and Griffin McElroy (hosts of My Brother, My Brother and Me) to review Paul Blart: Mall Cop 2 every Thanksgiving for the rest of their lives.

In 2023, playwright Alan Talaga produced Paul Blart 3: Blart of Darkness at the Broom Street Theater in Madison, Wisconsin. This new take on the series, only marginally connected to the preceding films, imagines Blart as a Mad Max-style hero in a post-apocalyptic wasteland.

=== Accolades ===
Award	Category	Nominee	Result
Teen Choice Awards	Choice Movie: Comedy	Paul Blart: Mall Cop 2	Nominated
Teen Choice Awards	Choice Movie Actor: Comedy	Kevin James	Nominated
Teen Choice Awards	Choice Movie Actress: Comedy	Raini Rodriguez	Nominated
Golden Raspberry Award	Worst Picture	Todd Garner, Kevin James, Adam Sandler	Nominated
Golden Raspberry Award	Worst Actor	Kevin James	Nominated
Golden Raspberry Award	Worst Director	Andy Fickman	Nominated
Golden Raspberry Award	Worst Screenplay	Nick Bakay and Kevin James	Nominated
Golden Raspberry Award	Worst Prequel, Remake, Rip-off or Sequel	Paul Blart: Mall Cop 2	Nominated
Golden Raspberry Award	Worst Screen Combo	Kevin James and either his Segway or his glued-on mustache	Nominated

== Possible sequel ==
In January 2022, Kevin James expressed interest in making a third film, but he stated that a script had not yet been developed. Co-star Lauren Ash has also expressed interest in doing a sequel.
