= The Worst Idea of All Time =

Comedy and film podcast

- Genre: Comedy

Cast and voices
- Hosted by: Tim Batt; Guy Montgomery

Publication
- Original release: 2014
- Provider: Little Empire Podcast Network
- Updates: Weekly

Related
- Related shows: 'Til Death Do Us Blart

The Worst Idea of All Time is a podcast hosted by New Zealand comedians Tim Batt and Guy Montgomery where they watch and review the same film every week for a year. In each season, the film chosen is one neither of the hosts have seen before and is generally considered to be a bad film.

== Background ==
The original concept, as stated in the first episode of season one, was to watch Grown Ups 2 "until it became worthwhile". The hosts adapted the scope of the podcast to watching the film once a week for a full calendar year. Some other films that were considered for season one were Con Air and The Room, but they were passed over for being too good and too bad respectively. In episode two of season one, Montgomery claimed that his main reason for hosting the podcast was to become better friends with Batt.

== Seasons ==
=== Season 1: Grown Ups 2 ===
In the first season, the hosts watched the Adam Sandler comedy Grown Ups 2 once per week for 52 weeks. Neither of them was familiar with the plot of the first Grown Ups film.

The final viewing occurred in Los Angeles. Batt and Montgomery began an Indiegogo campaign promising that, if they reached their goal, both would have a picture of Patrick Schwarzenegger, who has a small role in the film, tattooed on their bodies. They fulfilled this promise when their goal was passed.

=== Season 2: Sex and the City 2 ===
In the second season, the hosts watched Sex and the City 2 every week for a year. The film was chosen off the back of a gag that was hastily included at the end of a video Batt made about finishing the first season.

Sex And The City 2 has a run time of 2 hours and 26 minutes, making it a full 45 minutes longer than Grown Ups 2.

=== Season 3: We Are Your Friends ===
In the third season, the hosts watched the 2015 drama We Are Your Friends 60 times. In the first episode of the season, Batt mentioned that they had received a lot of feedback about how they had broken the spirit of the podcast by not choosing a sequel or a particularly terrible film, but both hosts concluded that there were never any rules stating that the film had to be either.

=== Season 4: Sex and the City ===
In the fourth season, the hosts watched the 2008 movie Sex and the City.

=== Emergency Season: Home Alone 3 ===
During a lockdown in New Zealand during the COVID-19 pandemic, the hosts watched Home Alone 3 every three days to produce a nine-episode season, plus a spoof of a director's commentary.

=== Season 5: Emmanuelle ===
At the end of September, 2020, Montgomery and Batt have undertaken the fifth season, and instead of rewatching the same movie every week they are watching a different movie from the same film series. The film series they pick from are the French/American Emmanuelle series of softcore pornography films.

=== Season 6: The Fast and the Furious ===
From December 2022 to December 2023, Batt and Montgomery watched The Fast and the Furious franchise in reverse, with each film watched the number of times matching its number in the series (F9 nine times, The Fate of the Furious eight times, etc.) In 2024, they announced their intent for it to be the final season.

=== Season 7: Joker: Folie à Deux ===
Beginning in November 2025, Batt and Montgomery released episodes of a "method film review" of Joker: Folie à Deux, a process that involved 14 watches of the film over five days while living in the Classic Comedy Club (in Auckland).

=== Season 8: Grown Ups 3 ===
In June 2026, Batt and Montgomery announced that upon the eventual release of Grown Ups 3 (whose production was confirmed in May 2026), they would bring back the original format of the podcast, watching the movie once a week for a year; Batt stated that, fulfilling a promise he'd made in the early years of the podcast, he would watch it weekly for two years.

== Other episodes ==
=== Friendzone and Family Time ===
Friendzone episodes began during the second season as a way to thank contributors to the podcast. The hosts read emails and social media messages sent in. These episodes were later renamed "Family Time" during Season 6.

=== Reviews and DirComms ===
Halfway through the second season, Batt and Montgomery created a Patreon page where subscribers could vote on a movie for the hosts to watch and record a directors commentary on. At the conclusion of season three, they decided to begin releasing the Patreon podcasts as part of their regular feed for free.

Episodes released discuss the films:

- Jingle All the Way (1996)
- Batman & Robin (1997)
- Southland Tales (2006)
- Superbabies: Baby Geniuses 2 (2004)
- God's Not Dead (2014)
- Toys (1992)
- Pass Thru (2016)
- Fateful Findings (2013)
- Jack and Jill (2011)
- I Am Here....Now (2009)
- Lost in Space (1998)
- From Justin to Kelly (2003)
- Nacho Libre (2006)
- Double Down (2005)
- Love on a Leash (2011)
- Foodfight! (2012)
- The Watch (2012)
- Gigli (2003)
- Jersey Girl (2004)
- Kirk Cameron's Saving Christmas (2014)
- Rapsittie Street Kids: Believe in Santa (2002)
- Van Wilder (2002)
- D.C. Cab (1983)
- Bucky Larson: Born to Be a Star (2011)
- The Book of Henry (2017)

=== And Just Like That... ===
Starting in December 2021, Worst Idea covered the first season of And Just Like That..., the Sex And The City sequel series, including a 'making of' special. On February 18th 2021, prior to the series' release, they livestreamed their own parody And Just Like That's pilot episode, a table read titled And Just Like This.

Several guests featured in the mini-series including author Maureen Johnson and comedian Becky Lucas. After the first three episodes were recorded, abuse allegations against Chris Noth were made public, prompting Batt to record an introduction to Part 1 expressing support for survivors of sexual abuse.

== Reception ==
In 2024, Worst Idea is New Zealand's most successful comedy podcast at over 18 million downloads. The hosts have attributed the success of the show to a shout-out from the host of another podcast about movies, How Did This Get Made?. This in turn led to a front-page story on Vice, which described the contents of the podcast as "extended bouts of maniacal laughter, existential reflections, and self-loathing." In an interview with The Spinoff, Montgomery attributed the show's success to "the fact it was a pair of New Zealanders reflecting back American culture" - similar to the success of the TV series Flight of the Conchords - as well as the pair's comedic chemistry.

The show has received a number of recommendations from various publications. Peter Wells suggested the show for a column in The Sydney Morning Herald, calling the show "part endurance test, part performance art" and praising its accessibility to new listeners. Hannah Verdier also reviewed the show positively for The Guardian, noting its constructive criticism and genuine humor that elevated the show above "men taking down a chick flick."

== Related media ==
In 2015, the hosts teamed up with Justin, Travis, and Griffin McElroy, hosts of the podcast My Brother, My Brother and Me, to create the annually recorded 'Til Death Do Us Blart, in which the hosts must watch Paul Blart: Mall Cop 2 every Thanksgiving for the rest of their lives. Each host has a replacement host who takes their place when they die.

Batt also began a podcast network called Little Empire Podcasts, which includes shows hosted by various New Zealand comedians. The company's podcasts include Cult Popture, Boners of the Heart, The Male Gayz, The Walk Out Boys, Hosting and Polidicks.

In October 2021, Batt appeared as a guest on the "Grown Ups 2" episode of movie podcast Diminishing Returns. He watched it again as part of his preparation for the appearance.

In March 2022, Batt appeared on SUDDENLY: a Frank Sinatra podcast having watched the Frank Sinatra film The Kissing Bandit, widely considered to be among Sinatra's worst ever. The episode was structured around the life of Estonian-Australian immigrant Peeter Pedaja, a man who had been inspired to commit armed robbery after watching The Kissing Bandit in 1950 then later made a name for himself after several failed attempts at sea crossings in oil-drum vessels of his own construction. Batt drew parallels between Pedaja's determination in the face of repeated failures and Batt's own determination to watch poorly-reviewed films repeatedly.
