= Sheena Colette =

American actress

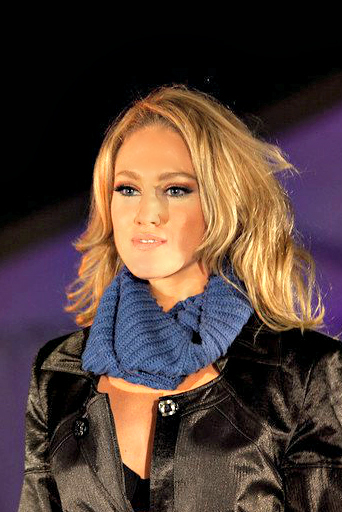
- Sheena Colette
- Occupation: Actress
- Website: www.sheenacolette.com

Sheena Colette is an American actress.

== Career ==
Colette appeared in LoCash Cowboy's music video "Here Comes Summer" directed by Brian Lazzaro of Stroudavarious Records, Thalía's "Ten Paciencia" directed by Emilio Estefan, and Alejandra Tejada's "Indomable". On screen, she is noted as having the perfect three: "performance, ability to take direction and look". In 2011 she was interviewed by Industry magazine for being a reputable actor native to New York. In 2012, Colette kicked off the season three premiere of A&E's The Glades, and appeared in the Netflix horror flick House of Bodies as Sadie Jenkins. In 2013, Colette played Angela, a cancer-stricken woman in One Last Time, directed by Dhimitri Ismailaj. One Last Time was selected for screening at the Cannes Film Festival, and Cinesogni Festival in Ravenna, and several other festival outlets worldwide. In 2014, Colette joined the cast of Walt Before Mickey alongside Jon Heder, Thomas Ian Nicholas, David Henrie and Arthur L. Bernstein. In 2015, Colette landed the role of Jeanine Markham playing a scientist attempting to disprove the existence of God. She received critical acclaim, and was awarded the 2016 Best Actress Award from the Beverly Hills Film Festival. In 2018, Colette landed the role to play a breast cancer survivor named Willow Adair in the Ziad Hamzeh film Willow, a story based on the novel Walk Beside Me by Christine Handy.

== Modeling career ==
Colette was photographed by famed photographer Philip Lorca DiCorcia in W Magazines "A Perfect World" which was noted by the New York Times as making NYC appear "one-dimensional and depopulated".

== Filmography ==
Year	Film	Role	Director
2018	Sushi Tushi	Gabbi O'Donnell	Ziad Hamzeh
2017	Victrix		
2016	Apollyon	Sarah	Sean Rosa
2015	Irrefutable Proof	Jeanine Markham	Ziad Hamzeh
2015	Dante's Purgatorio		Boris Acosta
2014	Walt Before Mickey	Dessie	Khoa Le
2013	Dante's Hell Animated	Fury Magaera (Voice)	Boris Acosta
2012	Stasis	Lois / Sophie	Pezhrman Jatala
2012	House of Bodies	Sadie Jenkins	Alex Merkin
