= 'Til Death Do Us Blart =

Podcast about Paul Blart: Mall Cop 2

- Genre: Comedy

Cast and voices
- Hosted by: Tim Batt; Guy Montgomery; Justin McElroy; Travis McElroy; Griffin McElroy

Publication
- Original release: 2015
- Updates: Yearly

Related
- Related shows: The Worst Idea of All Time, My Brother, My Brother and Me
- Website: blart.libsyn.com

'Til Death Do Us Blart is an annual podcast which centres around the hosts watching and reviewing Paul Blart: Mall Cop 2 once a year for the rest of time. The show has been running since 2015, with new episodes released every American Thanksgiving.

== Details ==
The current hosts are Tim Batt and Guy Montgomery of The Worst Idea of All Time plus Justin, Travis and Griffin McElroy of My Brother, My Brother and Me. Each have chosen others to replace them in the event of their deaths and those future hosts will do the same, meaning the podcast should theoretically continue forever.

The premise is an escalation of Batt and Montgomery's The Worst Idea of All Time, which originally involved watching the same film once a week for a year.

In April 2020, due to the global COVID-19 pandemic, a bonus episode was released in which the hosts watched and reviewed the first Paul Blart: Mall Cop.

== Reception ==
The Guardian praised "this single-minded and giddily in-jokey podcast from the makers of the popular comedy advice pod My Brother, My Brother and Me. Since 2015, the trio – plus New Zealand comedians Tim Batt and Guy Montgomery – have spent Thanksgiving rewatching Paul Blart: Mall Cop 2, Paul Blart: Mall Cop's even less illustrious sequel, before reconvening to (re)discuss the intricacies and idiocies of one of the most derided films of the century."

Matt Miller, of Esquire, praised the podcast in a review, and concluded, "If one of the hosts should die, they pass this curse on to someone else. And it's a curse I'd gladly take—I'll be listening to the podcast until the end of linear time anyway."
