= 1000 to 1: The Cory Weissman Story =

- Directed by: Mike Levine
- Written by: Bob Burris
- Produced by: Bruce Gordon; Bob Burris
- Starring: David Henrie; Jean Louisa Kelly; Hannah Marks; Beau Bridges
- Cinematography: James Mathers
- Edited by: Richard Halsey; Colleen Halsey
- Music by: Arturo Sandoval
- Production companies: Gettysburg Great Productions; Gordon-Burris Films
- Distributed by: Gaiam Vivendi Entertainment
- Release date: March 4, 2014
- Running time: 99 minutes
- Country: United States
- Language: English

1000 to 1: The Cory Weissman Story is a 2014 American biographical sports drama film directed by Mike Levine, written by Bob Burris, and starring David Henrie, Beau Bridges, Cassi Thomson, Hannah Marks, Jean Louisa Kelly, and Luke Kleintank.

== Plot ==
Cory Weissman was a student-athlete, a basketball player, who had a stroke while attending Gettysburg College. He scored 1000 points in high school and looked forward to success as a starting point guard. Basketball is his life's primary focus, but as a freshman, he has an AVM stroke which paralyzes his left side. Cory has to cope with his disability and answer the question "why me?" Does everything happen for a reason or just fate?

Despite the sad prognosis of his brain damage, the young athlete is hopeful of his recovery and return to basketball. Physical therapy is slow, but with the support of his cat, fish, coach and teammates, Cory returns to college. Cory is allowed to dress and play in the last game his senior year. To the joy of everyone, he scores one point—hence the title "1000 to 1". He finds new meaning in his life, both on and off the court.

== Cast ==
- David Henrie as Cory Weissman
- Luke Kleintank as Brendan "Pops" Trelease, Cory's friend and teammate
- Beau Bridges as Coach
- Jean Louisa Kelly as Tina Weissman, Cory's mother
- Ashlee Evans as herself
- Cassi Thomson as Ally Sullivan, Cory's girlfriend before the injury
- Hannah Marks as Jess Evans, Cory's girlfriend after the injury
- Myk Watford as Marc Weissman, Cory's father

== Production ==
Principal photography began in October 2012. The film was shot in 20 days, mostly at Gettysburg College.

== Release ==
The film was released directly to DVD and on demand on March 4, 2014.

== See also ==
- List of basketball films
