= Desmond Eastwood =

British actor

- Born: Lisburn, Northern Ireland
- Education: Queen's University, Belfast; Gaiety School of Acting
- Occupation: Actor
- Years active: 2017–present
- Television: Normal People

Desmond Eastwood is a stage, television and film actor from Northern Ireland.

== Early life ==
Born in Lisburn, the son of Mary and Desmond Eastwood, he attended Friends' School, Lisburn. He graduated with a law degree from Queen's College, Belfast in 2014, before moving to Dublin to study acting at the Gaiety School of Acting. He has five siblings. His brother Colum is a film maker.

== Career ==
He has appeared in television productions including Krypton, Vikings and Blood, working alongside Adrian Dunbar, and worked on Game of Thrones. He also appeared in his brother's first feature film Black Medicine, which starred Antonia Campbell-Hughes.

He could be seen in 2020 television series Normal People, playing Niall who befriends the character Connell, played by Paul Mescal. For his role in the series, he was nominated for best supporting actor at the 17th Irish Film & Television Awards. Eastwood and Mescal were performing in The Lieutenant of Inishmore together on stage in Dublin when the production was halted by the COVID-19 pandemic. Derry Girls writer Lisa McGee labelled his Normal People character "the soundest one", and Eastwood later appeared in her series as Benny.

He has roles in the 2023 Liam Neeson film In the Land of Saints and Sinners, and Pierce Brosnan film The Last Rifleman.

He plays Detective Sergeant Murray Canning in the first two series of the BBC One Northern Ireland police drama Blue Lights.

He can be seen in the 2024 Finnish drama Stormskerry Maja and the Christoph Waltz comedy action film Old Guy.

== Partial filmography ==
Key
†	Denotes works that have not yet been released

Year	Title	Role	Notes
2018	Krypton	Taz-Ran	
2020	Normal People	Niall	
2020	Vikings	Messenger	
2021	Black Medicine	Conor	
2022	Derry Girls	Benny	
2023	In the Land of Saints and Sinners	Curtis June	
2023–2024	Blue Lights	DS Murray Canning	
2023	The Last Rifleman	Tony McCann	
2024	Stormskerry Maja	Lieutenant John Wilson	
2024	Old Guy	Colton	
2025	Martin Scorsese Presents: The Saints	Saint Patrick	
2026	No Ordinary Heist	"Red"	Post-production
