= Andrew Capra =

American singer-songwriter

Andrew Capra is an American songwriter, producer and session vocalist living in Nashville, Tennessee. Since the disbanding of his band Brave Citizens, Capra began working as a session vocalist in Los Angeles and has written for and sang on a variety of albums, films, and commercials. His vocals were also used in a vocal sample library for the website SoundBetter.

The 2016 Netflix film Walt Before Mickey, starring Thomas Ian Nicholas and Jon Heder, included the song "Just a Wish", written by Capra along with Rob Graves and Jeremy Rubolino. The song was performed by American Idol finalist Julie Zorrilla. In 2018, Netflix film The Little Mermaid featured the song "This Heart of Mine" written by Capra, Aureo Baqueiro and Rubolino. Capra also wrote multiple songs for the 2020 movie Anastasia: Once Upon a Time.

Songs in Capra's catalog have been heard on terrestrial radio and Netflix, TV networks like NBC and Fox, as well as part of campaigns for companies like Mazda, Mountain Dew and Engelbert Strauss.

In 2018, Capra relocated from Los Angeles, California to Nashville, Tennessee, and founded the rock band Stepsons. The band's song "Everything in Motion" was heard on Fox show Deputy in Season 1, Episode 5.

Capra continues to write and produce for a variety of rock and country artists like Alexandra Kay and Adair's Run.

== Projects ==
=== Brave Citizens ===
Capra founded the rock band Brave Citizens while studying at University of California, Irvine, releasing the EP Revolutions in 2009 from his dorm room with bandmate Adam Bialik, followed by a US tour and festival appearances. Songs "How Much Longer?", "The Same Way" and "All or Not" were featured in a number of American television programs. In June 2009 the band joined Lydia, Eye Alaska and PlayRadioPlay! for the Stay Awake tour.

In 2016 the band released Ashland, an EP of songs meant for a never-recorded full length.

=== Andrew London ===
After the disbanding of Brave Citizens, Capra began an album of solo work under the "Andrew London" pseudonym, building a studio band with guitarist Bruce Kulick, bassists Chris Chaney and Tony Franklin, and drummer Miles McPherson. The album Hard Light was funded through Pledgemusic and released digitally. In July 2016, the Longer Days EP was released on iTunes, collaborating with Aaron Sterling, Bialik, Kulick, and Joshua Gleave.

In September 2016 Capra released the EP Live at The Hotel Cafe, featuring new songs in progress as well as a cover of "A Sort of Homecoming" by U2.

In 2017 Capra began a shift to releasing singles, starting with the track "Big Sky".

=== Stepsons ===
After relocating in Nashville, Capra started the heartland rock band Stepsons. "Where You Came From" EP was produced by Paul Moak, Joshua Gleave and Capra. The single "L.A. Morning" was debuted on Lightning 100. The band followed up with "Live at Analog", recorded at the Hutton Hotel venue in August 2019. The song "Everything in Motion" was heard on Fox show Deputy in Season 1, Episode 5 (2020).
