= Cadbury Dream Factory =

2014 New Zealand reality television series

- Genre: Reality television
- Directed by: Mitchell Hawkes; Justin Hawkes
- Presented by: Brooke Howard-Smith
- Starring: Kimberley Crossman; Walter Neilands; Guy Montgomery; Jesse Griffin
- Country of origin: New Zealand
- Original language: English
- No. of series: 1
- No. of episodes: 6

Production
- Executive producer: John McDonald
- Producer: Hayley Cunningham
- Editors: Carl Budden; Doug Dillaman
- Running time: 60 minutes
- Production company: MediaWorks

Original release
- Network: TV3
- Release: 20 February – 10 April 2014

Cadbury Dream Factory is a New Zealand reality television series. The premise of the show is to realise the "dreams" of ordinary people. The first episode aired on 20 February 2014 on TV3.

The show is presented and hosted by Brooke Howard-Smith and includes his 'helpers', actress Kimberley Crossman, former Sticky TV children's host Walter Neilands, performer Guy Montgomery and stand-up comedian Jesse Griffin.

== Premise ==
Cadbury Dream Factory is a reality TV show which featured people who had their "wishes" realised. TV3 advertised the show as bringing "Kiwis' dreams to life".

The events in the show varied from "silly" content, such as giving a dog a makeover, to reuniting families, arranging meetings with famous New Zealanders, and helping a couple get to Paris for a marriage proposal.

== Promotional content ==
Cadbury Dream Factory was developed in sponsorship with Cadbury. TV3 ran the "Dream Factory Blog" to cover the events in the show, promoted with Cadbury branding.

In conjunction with the show, Cadbury ran a promotion to offer six people a job as a "chocolate taster". Anyone who bought a bar of Cadbury chocolate could enter the competition online. Winners also received NZ$10,000 and a tip to the Cadbury factory in Dunedin.
