= This Is the Year =

2020 film by David Henrie

- Theatrical release poster
- Directed by: David Henrie
- Screenplay by: Sienna Aquilini; David Henrie; Pepe Portillo; Bug Hall
- Story by: Angelo Libutti
- Produced by: James Henrie; Leo Severino
- Starring: Lorenzo James Henrie; Vanessa Marano; Gregg Sulkin; Jeff Garlin
- Cinematography: Nathanael Vorce
- Edited by: Marcus Heleker; Pepe Portillo
- Music by: Benjamin Zecker
- Production companies: Bold Entertainment; Novo Media Group
- Distributed by: Vertical Entertainment
- Release date: August 28, 2020
- Running time: 97 minutes
- Country: United States
- Language: English

This Is the Year is a 2020 American teen coming-of-age comedy-drama film directed by David Henrie, starring Lorenzo James Henrie, Vanessa Marano, Alyssa Jirrels, Bug Hall, Jake Short, Jeff Garlin, and Gregg Sulkin. It is Henrie's feature film directorial debut and Selena Gomez and Denis J Gallagher served as an executive producers.

The film had a live virtual premiere on August 28, 2020. It was released in select theaters in the United States and through video on demand on September 24, 2021, by Vertical Entertainment.

== Plot ==
A high school senior and his friends embark on a road trip to see their favorite band at the biggest music festival of the year.

== Cast ==
- Lorenzo James Henrie as Josh
  - Boston Pierce as Young Josh
- Vanessa Marano as Molly
- Gregg Sulkin as Kale
- Jeff Garlin as Mr. Elmer
- Alyssa Jirrels as Zoey
- Bug Hall as Donnie
- Jake Short as Mikey
- David Henrie as Sebastian
- Gregg Christie as Luca
- Kate Katzman as Sofia
- Josh Rhett Noble as Homeless Jared
- Laura Marano as Hipster Gal

== Reception ==
The film received 71% on Rotten Tomatoes.
