= Peeter Pedaja =

Estonian Australian adventurer (1931–1985)

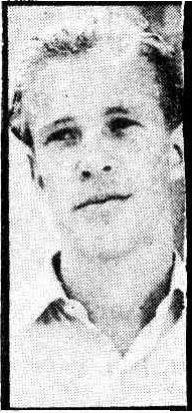
- Pedaja at age 17 in 1948, shortly after immigrating to Australia.
- Born: August 24, 1931; Tallinn, Estonia
- Died: October 17, 1985 (aged 54); Melbourne
- Other names: Peter Pedaya, Stanley Lexton
- Occupations: Adventurer, sculptor
- Known for: Attempted sea crossings in oil drums

Peeter Pedaja (also known as Peter Pedaya and Stanley Lexton, August 24, 1931 – October 17, 1985) was an Estonian Australian refugee, sculptor and adventurer, best known for his multiple attempts at sea crossings in oil drum vessels of his own construction.

== Early life ==
=== World War II ===
In 1931, Pedaja was born in Tallinn to Johannes and Rosalie Pedaja. During his childhood, Estonia in World War II saw the country occupied by both Soviets and Nazis at different times. By the early 1940s, Pedaja's father was arrested by the Soviets and sentenced to a slave labour camp, while his mother and two sisters managed to flee Estonia by boat as refugees. Pedaja himself was left behind to spend his early teenage years alone and on the run from both German and Russian forces. He later described this time in his life to Wide World Magazine:

I just lived around. Sometimes I went to school, but when I didn't like it, I didn't go. Sometimes I worked, sometimes I did nothing. I got my food wherever I could, and that meant some funny places. I was on the move most of the time, sleeping in railway trucks, under hedges, in barns - anywhere at all, as long as I was out of reach of the Russians and the Germans. I was pretty tough in those days... I was just cold, that's all. The temperature in Estonia often drops to 30 degrees below. I spent the whole of one night on the run, in freezing weather, with the Russian cops after me. I couldn't hole up anywhere to get warm. I just had to keep going.

After the end of the war, he learned that his mother and one of his sisters were living in a displaced persons camp in Geislingen, Germany, and that his other sister was now based in Stockholm, Sweden. Still a teenager, Pedaja then dedicated several years to finding a way across the Iron Curtain by various means of transport and subterfuge to reunite with his family. He made it to Stockholm by 1947, where he found one of his sisters, began learning English and told his life story to the international news media. The following year, he finally reunited with his mother and other sister in Geislingen.

=== Departure for Australia ===
At age 17, Pedaja decided to migrate to Australia and leave his family behind once again. He departed from West Germany on HMAS Kanimbla as one of 429 male unaccompanied and mostly unmarried displaced men from Baltic nations, specifically chosen to meet these criteria by Australian authorities. These men shared the voyage with 333 ratings of the British Royal Navy who had volunteered for service in the Royal Australian Navy.

The Kanimbla stopped in Genoa along the way, where Pedaja would have witnessed a riot break out between the Navy cohort and Italian locals. Many were injured and one of the ratings died in hospital the following morning. At the time, the cause of this riot was reported as "a dispute with an Italian civilian, who accused the sailors of being drunk and molesting an old beggar woman." However, the ship's able seaman would later claim that the incident was actually caused by "a group of Communist activists who were staging an uprising in the north of Italy and wanted to demonstrate their influence by capturing a British ship docked in the harbour."

== Australian adventures ==
Pedaja ultimately arrived in Perth, Western Australia aboard the Kanimbla on October 11, 1948. He then spent a year hitch-hiking around the country before he turned 18. His mother and sisters also decided to emigrate to Australia, arriving in Melbourne in September 1949. Pedaja decided he wished to join them again, and rode the approximately 3,300 km from Perth to Melbourne across the Nullarbor Plain on a pushbike during the Australian summer.

On the night of December 10, 1950, Pedaja hijacked a motorcycle while brandishing a water pistol somewhere on the road near Gympie, Queensland. Heading further south, he then forced a car to stop between Landsborough and Nambour and demanded money from the driver, before speeding off and eventually being arrested by Queensland police. He later told the court he meant no harm, that he wanted material for a book he intended to write about his adventures in Australia, and that he was inspired to "do something unusual" by the recent film The Kissing Bandit, starring Frank Sinatra:

The "Kissing Bandit" in the film didn't mean to do any harm, and I didn't either. I've been honest all my life and always will be.

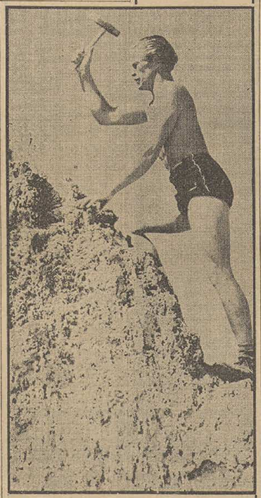
Pedaja carving sculptures into the cliff face at North Cottesloe Beach in 1953.

Justice O'Hagan was ultimately convinced Pedaja was motivated by "a sense of irresponsibility rather than an inclination to crime." Pedaja was released on a suspended sentence, and was later proclaimed "The Kissing Bandit in Real Life" by the Australian media.

In 1951, he attempted to register a design for a "slot constructed toy house." His application was rejected, however, as he had only included one simple line drawing that was determined to be "not to the standard of a competent draughtsman."

In 1952, he advertised in The Age newspaper for young men to join him on an expedition to Western Australia to start a timber milling, pearl and whale fishing station in exchange for a £16 fee. Nothing came of these plans, and Pedaja ultimately served three months' jail for "attempted false pretenses."

In 1953, he made a name for himself in Perth as a rock sculptor, carving elaborate scenes into the cliff face at Cottesloe Beach. In 1956, he did the same at Sandringham, Victoria, carving an "Olympic pageant" into the beach's soft cliff face. He also began using the name "Stanley Lexton" for his artistic endeavours and in some other contexts.

== Attempted oil drum sea crossings ==
=== 1957 ===
In 1957, Pedaja attempted to cross the Timor Sea from Mindil Beach in Darwin, Northern Territory to Timor in a vessel that consisted of three oil drums welded together in a row. He may have been inspired by Australian artist Ian Fairweather, who had attempted the same route on a raft made from aircraft fuel tanks in 1952, ultimately landing on Rote Island.

On the morning of his departure, a passerby named Gregory Black assisted Pedaja to tow the oil drum vessel across the beach. Black later described the scene:

The centre drum of the raft was cut open to form a cockpit. The cockpit allowed him just enough room to sit down but not enough to stretch his legs. There was no keel, no motor, no sail and no means of ensuring it would stay upright. He had two paddles, a five-gallon tin of water, several tins of fruit and seven tins of meat. He had put his clothes in suitcases, which were strapped on to the rear drums. He said he would pass the time by playing chess with himself. He had a fishing line and hoped to catch fish but would have to eat them raw. He intended drinking a small amount of sea water each day to disprove the old theory that it causes madness.

This vessel capsized. Pedaja had tied himself into the cockpit with rope, which meant he struggled for 90 seconds to untie himself while underwater before finally surfacing. Upon returning to Darwin, Pedaja immediately began work on a new design for his oil drum craft, adding two drums to the side for stability. He named the new version the D.S. Wakefield after Charles Wakefield, the founder of Castrol, with D.S. standing for "drift ship." Black took a photo of Pedaja brandishing a paddle in the Wakefield that is available to view on the State Library of New South Wales public online catalogue.

Pedaja headed for Timor again, making it approximately 20 miles before deciding to turn around as he felt he had "unfinished business in Darwin" and decided the Wakefield would be better with a sail. He then ate and drank all his rations, before realising that he was adrift and could not return to shore. After several nights lost at sea, Pedaja was ultimately rescued thanks to a chance discovery by the vessel Temora, which had mistaken him for a floating buoy. The captain was a man named Peter Petersen, who Pedaja observed had both a similar name to his and the same initials. Upon returning to Darwin, Pedaja began work on a third design:

I’ll make it a little bigger, give myself a place to lie down, and put up a sail. I’ll want 100 tins of food, 15 gallons of water, and some whisky to keep me company. After that, using the wind for fuel, I think I could become the first man to sail around the world in an oil drum... You can't sink a sealed tin, and that is just what I would represent.

=== 1959 ===
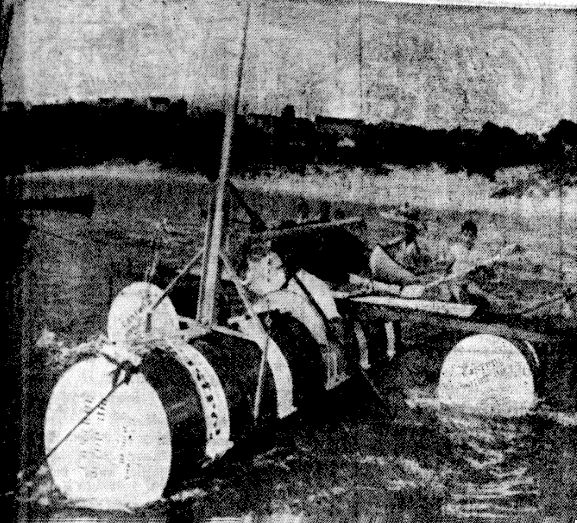
Pedaja's third raft, the Can-Tiki, moored at La Perouse.

In 1959, Pedaja attempted to cross the Tasman Sea from Sydney to New Zealand in a new oil drum vessel with an improved design. The Can-Tiki (likely named after the Kon-Tiki) had a sail, stabilising fins and a door tied to the rear with a suitcase strapped on. Movietone News cameras captured Pedaja welding the drums together in his backyard as his mother Rosalie watched on.

The stunt attracted attention throughout Australia and internationally. Australian maritime authorities attempted to impress on Pedaja that the vessel was unseaworthy and that an air and sea search for him would be costly and potentially dangerous in itself. The New Zealand government also warned him that even if the attempt was successful, he would not be legally allowed on their shores. Pedaja insisted he would still make the attempt, partly because he wanted to convince the Estonian government to allow his father to migrate to Australia:

The communists won't let him go unless they can get some favourable publicity from it. When I reach New Zealand, I will be world news. Then when I try again for his release, they may let him go... I don't know anything about all these people thinking that my scheme is hairbrained. I am determined to sail and nothing will stop me. I don't want anyone to risk his life looking for me at sea. I am prepared to put that in writing if the navigation authorities want it.

On December 13, 1959, a large crowd gathered at Frenchmans Beach in La Perouse to watch Pedaja depart for New Zealand. Movietone camera crews returned and documented the occasion in a newsreel. He drifted for an hour in the wrong direction and was ultimately towed back to La Perouse by the Volunteer Coastal Patrol vessel Pudaloo. Pedaja's attempt was front-page news on the following day's edition of The Sydney Morning Herald, under the headline "Canoe Voyage Held Up By Rudder Trouble: Oil Drum Trip Lasted an Hour."

On December 15, 1959, Pedaja departed for New Zealand again, saying he was "in it too deep now to back out." He once again failed after drifting in the wrong direction, and was jeered by crowds as he once again returned to La Perouse. Two days later, Pedaja then accepted an offer from Manly Pool to sell them the Can-Tiki so that children could play on it during the school holidays. Pedaja once again left La Perouse by sea, this time attempting to sail to Manly to drop the vessel off. Although assisted by a motor on this occasion, the motor broke down, and so Pedaja washed ashore at Maroubra.

=== 1974 ===
In 1974, Pedaja turned up again in Darwin having once again concocted plans to attempt a sea crossing in an oil drum vessel. This time he was intending to build a raft out of oil drums on which he would tow a four-wheel drive from Darwin to Africa. "People put car engines on boats. Why not put a car on a boat?", Pedaja said, adding that he could think of nothing better to do.

== Fate of his family ==
In 1958, Pedaja married Marjorie Leone Pedaya, née Heron. They later divorced.

In 1967, Pedaja's mother Rosalie died suddenly after being hit by a car while attempting to cross the road in front of the 67 tram in St Kilda.

Pedaja's father, Johannes, was later established to have defected to the Soviet Union and worked for them as an informant. Finnish historian Juha Pohjonen wrote that Johannes was likely motivated by desperation and a lack of money rather than any ideological reason.

== Later years ==
=== Guatemala ===
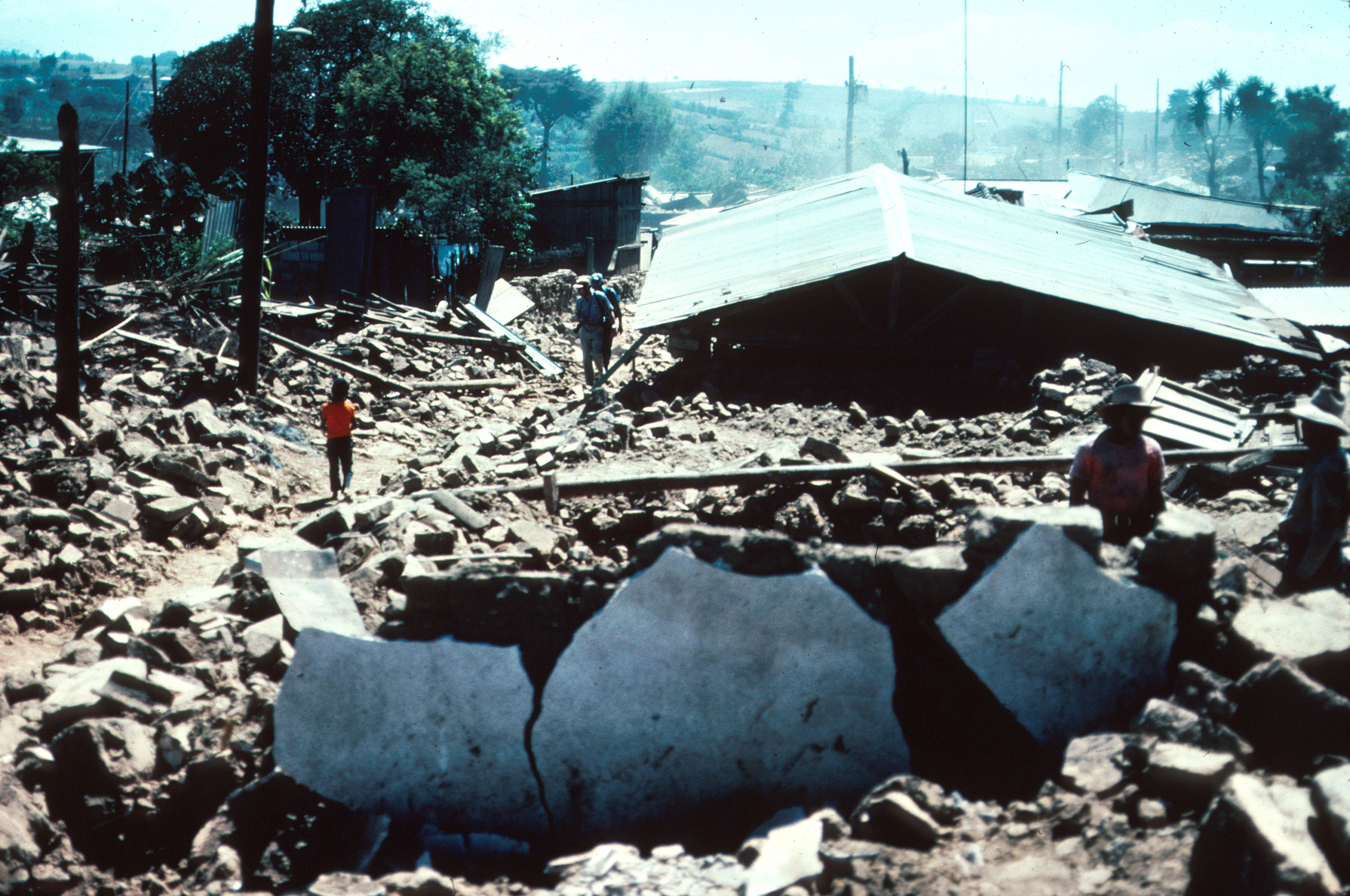
Aftermath of the Guatemala earthquake, 1976

By 1974, Pedaja had at some stage been involved in a car accident and was receiving a disability pension. Apparently seeking treatment and an ideal retirement community, he then travelled to the United States and Mexico.

On February 4, 1976, Pedaja then arrived in Guatemala on the same day as the 1976 Guatemala earthquake. Travelling to Acatenango and witnessing the extent of the destruction, he then founded the "Acatenango Rebuilding Fund" and returned to Miami, Florida to commence a fundraising effort. By this time he had also begun using a phonetic English spelling of his name, rendering it "Peter Pedaya" in some contexts. He told the Tallahassee Democrat:

I'm trying to raise $20 million. I won't go back empty-handed... I want to rebuild this town by American standards. If I can get this thing going, you'll have the people on your side over there. It will show that Americans do care... I was a little bit down when I went to Guatemala. I had no real aim in life. This has given me a purpose. The whole town is depending on me now. I can't let them down.

What ultimately came of the Acatenango Rebuilding Fund is unknown.

=== Death ===
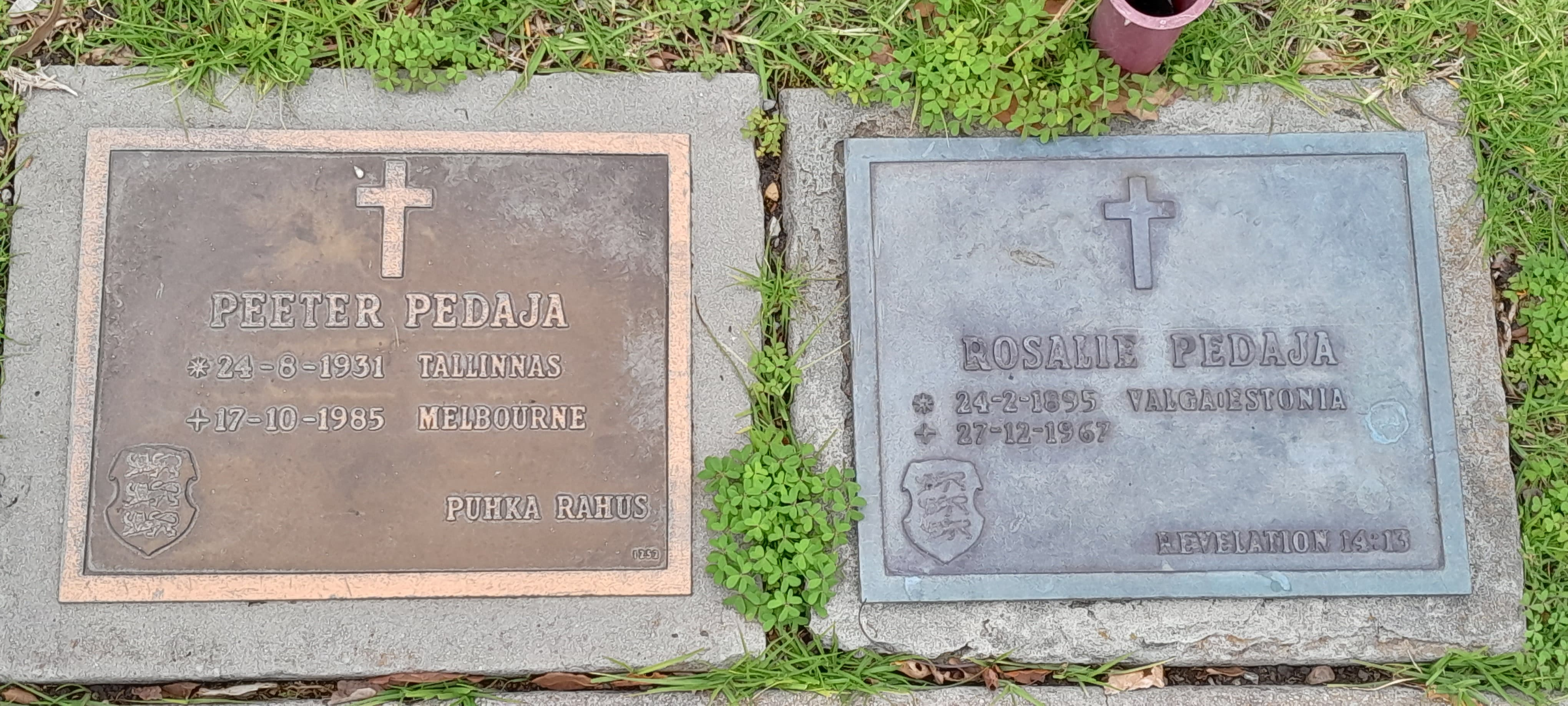
Peeter's grave in Melbourne, next to that of his mother.

By 1985, Pedaja had found his way back to Australia once again. He died on October 17 of that year while living in St Kilda. His death certificate listed the cause of death as "Hepatic encephalopathy – 10 days. Hepatic cirrhosis – years." He was buried in the Estonian Lutheran section of Fawkner Memorial Park, next to his mother.

== Legacy ==
Despite the international media attention he received during his lifetime, Pedaja's story apparently became mostly forgotten in both Australian and Estonian history. He was briefly mentioned in Ingrid Cranfield's The Challengers: British & Commonwealth Adventurers Since 1945, published in 1976.

In 2022, SUDDENLY: a Frank Sinatra podcast dedicated an episode to Pedaja's life story in the context of The Kissing Bandit, the Sinatra film which inspired him to commit armed robbery in 1950. The episode featured New Zealand comedian Tim Batt, who drew parallels between Pedaja's repeated failures at oil drum sea voyages and Batt's own endeavours to watch the same poorly-reviewed films repeatedly on the podcast The Worst Idea of All Time.

== See also ==
- Reza Baluchi, an Iranian refugee with a similar life story including multiple "hydro pod" sea crossing attempts.
- Estonian Australians
