= No Ordinary Heist =

British crime drama film

- Theatrical release poster
- Directed by: Colin McIvor
- Screenplay by: Colin McIvor; Aisling Corristine
- Produced by: Ruth Carter; Johanna Hogan; Damon Lane
- Starring: Eddie Marsan; Éanna Hardwicke
- Production companies: Picture Locked Productions; Blue Ink Films; Next Wednesday Films
- Distributed by: Wildcard Distribution
- Release dates: February 8, 2026 (Santa Barbara); March 27, 2026 (Ireland)
- Running time: 99 minutes
- Countries: United Kingdom; Ireland; United States
- Language: English

No Ordinary Heist is a 2026 thriller film directed and co-written by Colin McIvor, starring Eddie Marsan and Éanna Hardwicke. It is based around the Northern Bank robbery in Belfast in 2004.

The film had its world premiere at the 2026 Santa Barbara Film Festival and its UK premiere at the 2026 Glasgow Film Festival.

== Plot ==
On Friday, December 17, 2004, a group of IRA gunman watch Richard Murray, the manager of the Northern Bank Headquarters in Belfast, enter in the morning. Murray is under an enormous pressure of delivering news of staff cuts before Christmas, and faces constraints in his marriage. While at work, he disciplines Barry McKenne, the vault guard, of his lack of care for his job.

On Sunday, Barry is at home with his mother when the gunmen enter and hold them at gunpoint, while simultaneously breaching Murray's home. The leader of the men takes Barry to Murray's home, where Barry reveals that he knows the men. The leader tells them that they will rob the bank or face their loved ones' executions. The pair are given phones and told that a white van will pull up outside and they will be forced to wheel three crates of cash out past security, without a member of the IRA setting foot inside the bank.

On Monday, on the way to the bank, Murray accuses Barry of being in league with the gunmen, and their ensuing scuffle almost causes a car crash. At 11:43 am, they arrive at the bank, and Murray's behaviour arouses suspicion. Murray takes a screwdriver from his office and breaks into Barry's locker to take his notebook. At 3:21 pm, in a meeting with his superior, he is forced to rush out as his phone rings, but it is just "a test run" to ensure his utter cooperation.

Back at Barry's house, his mother attempts to escape and call for help, but is stopped by the hostage taker and injured. At 5:23 pm, Barry is called and told that the gunmen want a "sweetener" of £1 million in 20 pound notes for delivery at 6:25 pm. The pair head down to the vault, where security has eyes through CCTV footage. Murray suspects Barry again by his increased calls, and the pair scuffle, causing Marjorie, the female security member, to go down to check on them, but Murray claims he slipped. Marjorie seemingly sees the bag, but leaves.

At an unknown location, Mrs. Murray attempts to connect with her captor, who tells her of the "luck" that separates them, the lack of stability during the Troubles, and the disdain felt by members of the IRA towards the higher classes of Belfast. At the bank, Murray receives the "redundancy list" of those to fire, including Barry and Marjorie. When Barry asks about it as they are filling the bags, Murray lies about his name being on it. At 5:47 pm, Barry begins to have a panic attack, but pushes on out of fear for his mother. Before the van arrives, Murray lets the workers go home early to protect them, which coincides with Barry exiting the bank and avoiding any violence when security asks to see his bag.

Marjorie confronts Murray on her stress about the workers on the list, which Murray lies about, and about her dedication and importance in his career, where Murray asks her to trust him. Murray attempts to get her to leave, but Marjorie explains that she needs her job to stay on top of her life. At 6:18 pm, Barry rings the men and avoids an incident with a drunk man he knows, and they collect the money. Despite this, the men send threatening images of their loved ones and call again asking for three crates.

As they are loading the crates, they are met with Jim, another security guard, who they narrowly deflect. As they are wheeling up the crates, they trip and money falls out, but luckily, Jim is reading a newspaper and cannot see them on the CCTV footage. At 7 pm, the truck arrives and the pair begin to load the money in, and are nearly discovered by a passing group of women. The men insist that Barry comes with them as "insurance", which causes Murray's doubts to stir.

In his office, Murray is looking over Barry's notebook, but the phone rings and Barry answers and demands more cash on the behalf of the gunmen. Meanwhile, Mrs. Murray is led out to the woods and her shoes are stolen. Marjorie is about to head out, but Jeff, the cleaner, gives her the redundancy list, which Murray had earlier misplaced. At 8:01 pm, the truck returns with Barry. Marjorie comes out as Murray loads the trucks, and they exchange a mixed glare before she leaves the bank.

Later that night, Mrs. Murray sees that her captor has left, and she runs out of the woods and sees her car has been burnt. She flees and stops another car, pleading for help. At the bank, the truck leaves just as a police cruiser arrives, and after an hour, the men flee, leaving Barry's mother untied. In the vault, Murray reflects on how work has destroyed his life and his marriage, and the pair share a moment of connection while understanding that they'll both probably be fired. At the police station, Murray connects with his wife, who breaks down crying in his arms, while Barry reunites with his mother at their home.

In the aftermath, it is revealed that £26.5 million was stolen from the bank, making it one of the most expensive bank robberies in Irish history. On Friday, January 7, 2005, Hugh Orde speaks about the robbery, stating it was no "Robin Hood crime" and some of the money is found burnt beside a nearby farm on Friday, February 18, 2005. Furthermore, it is stated that the robbers have never been identified, and that to this day, nobody was ever convicted of the robbery.

== Cast ==
- Eddie Marsan as Richard Murray (Based on Kevin McMullan)
- Éanna Hardwicke as Barry "Baz" McKenne (Based on Chris Ward)
- Eva Birthistle as Celine Murray
- Michelle Fairley as Marjorie "Mags" Fulton
- Desmond Eastwood as "Red", the Leader
- Patrick O'Kane as Gravel
- Paddy Genkins as Jim

== Production ==
Inspired by the true events from 2004 of the Northern Bank robbery, the film is directed by Colin McIvor and co-written by McIvor with Aisling Corristine. The film is produced by Ruth Carter and Johanna Hogan for Picture Locked Productions with Damon Lane of Next Wednesday Films.

The cast is led by Éanna Hardwicke and Eddie Marsan, and also includes Eva Birthistle, Desmond Eastwood and Michelle Fairley.

Principal photography took place in Belfast and Dublin in January 2025.

== Release ==
The world premiere was at the 2026 Santa Barbara Film Festival. The film had its UK premiere at the 2026 Glasgow Film Festival. The film was released in Ireland on 27 March 2026.
