= Old Guy =

2024 film by Simon West

- Theatrical release poster
- Directed by: Simon West
- Written by: Greg Johnson
- Produced by: Jib Polhemus; Martin Brennan; Hal Sadoff
- Starring: Christoph Waltz; Lucy Liu; Cooper Hoffman; Ryan McParland; Ann Akinjirin; Jason Done; Tony Hirst; Kate Katzman; Conor Mullen; Rory Mullen
- Cinematography: Martin Ahlgren
- Edited by: Andrew MacRitchie
- Music by: Andrew Simon McAllister: Mono Town
- Production companies: R.U. Robot Studios; Highland Film Group; 23ten Productions Ltd.; Source Management + Production
- Distributed by: The Avenue
- Release dates: October 17, 2024 (NBFF); February 21, 2025 (United States)
- Running time: 93 minutes
- Country: United States
- Language: English
- Box office: $293,410

Old Guy is a 2024 American action comedy film directed by Simon West, written by Greg Johnson, and produced by Martin Brennan, Jib Polhemus, and Dark Castle Entertainment. It was filmed on location in Northern Ireland and stars Christoph Waltz, Lucy Liu, and Cooper Hoffman.

Old Guy premiered at the Newport Beach Film Festival on October 17, 2024, and was released in the United States on February 21, 2025.

== Plot ==
A contract killer on the verge of retirement due to arthritis is given a new chance at fieldwork training Wihlborg, a prodigy assassin with an attitude. The subsequent mission to Northern Ireland is complicated by concerns that Wihlborg is part of a plan to eliminate the old guard in favour of a new generation.

== Cast ==
- Christoph Waltz as Danny Dolinski
- Lucy Liu as Anata
- Cooper Hoffman as Wihlborg
- Ryan McParland as Doug
- Ann Akinjirin as Opal
- Charlie Hamblett as Opal's assistant
- Jason Done as Milo
- Tony Hirst as William
- Kate Katzman as Simone
- Conor Mullen as Barbierri
- Rory Mullen as Yatzeck
- Helen Ryan as Tory Dolinski, Danny's mother
- Desmond Eastwood as Colton

== Production ==
In January 2023, it was announced that Highland Film Group were co-financing the film, to be produced by Jib Polhemus, and Martin Brennan with Hal Sadoff and Norman Golightly producing for Dark Castle Entertainment. Additionally, Christoph Waltz joined the cast. In April 2023, Lucy Liu, Cooper Hoffman and Desmond Eastwood were revealed to have joined the cast. Principal photography began in Belfast in mid-2023.

== Release ==
In March 2024, The Avenue acquired the North American distribution rights to the film. The film premiered at the Newport Beach Film Festival on October 17, 2024, at Fashion Island. The film was released in select theaters and digitally on February 21, 2025.

== Reception ==
On the review aggregator website Rotten Tomatoes, 26% of 38 critics' reviews are positive. The website's consensus reads: "Saddling an overqualified cast with a rote script, Old Guy's tired execution may leave audiences wondering whether it's time to put this concept out to pasture." Metacritic, which uses a weighted average, assigned the film a score of 33 out of 100, based on 11 critics, indicating "generally unfavorable" reviews.
