= Cardboard Boxer =

- Theatrical release poster
- Directed by: Knate Lee
- Written by: Knate Lee
- Produced by: Michael Roiff; Mike Witherill
- Starring: Thomas Haden Church; Terrence Howard; Boyd Holbrook; Rhys Wakefield; David Henrie
- Cinematography: Jeff Seibenick
- Music by: Jess Stroup
- Production companies: Night and Day Pictures
- Distributed by: Well Go USA Entertainment
- Release date: September 16, 2016
- Running time: 88 minutes
- Country: United States
- Language: English

Cardboard Boxer is a 2016 American drama film written and directed by Knate Lee. The film stars Thomas Haden Church, Terrence Howard, Boyd Holbrook, Rhys Wakefield and David Henrie.

The story is centered on a lonely homeless man who is offered by a young, upper-class kid to fight fellow down-and-outs for money to video it.

The film was released on September 16, 2016, by Well Go USA Entertainment.

== Cast ==
- Thomas Haden Church as Willie
- Terrence Howard as Pope
- Boyd Holbrook as Pinky
- Rhys Wakefield as J.J.
- Zach Villa as Tyler
- Macy Gray as Den Mother
- Jack Falahee as Leo
- William Stanford Davis as Jazzy
- Adam Clark as Skillet
- Conrad Roberts as Methusalah
- David Henrie as Clean Cut Man
- Johanna Braddy as Clean Cut Girl

== Release ==
The film was released on September 16, 2016, by Well Go USA Entertainment.

== Reception ==
On the review aggregator website Rotten Tomatoes, 38% of 8 critics' reviews are positive. Metacritic, which uses a weighted average, assigned the film a score of 41 out of 100, based on 5 critics, indicating "mixed or average" reviews.
