= Walt Before Mickey =

2015 American biographical drama film

- Theatrical release poster
- Directed by: Khoa Le
- Written by: Arthur L. Bernstein; Armando Gutierrez
- Based on: Walt Before Mickey: Disney's Early Years, 1919–1928 by Timothy S. Susanin
- Produced by: Armando Gutierrez; Arthur L. Bernstein; Frank Licari
- Starring: Thomas Ian Nicholas; Jon Heder; Jodie Sweetin; David Henrie; Armando Gutierrez; Arthur L. Bernstein; Bucky Dent
- Cinematography: Ian Dudley
- Edited by: Khoa Le; Lauren Young
- Music by: Jeremy Rubolino
- Production companies: Conglomerate Media; Lensbern Entertainment; ALB Productions; Quite Frankly Ent.
- Distributed by: Voltage Pictures: Mission Pictures International
- Release date: August 14, 2015
- Running time: 107 minutes
- Country: United States
- Language: English
- Budget: $568,000

Walt Before Mickey is a 2015 American independent biographical drama film about the early years of Walt Disney based on the book Walt Before Mickey: Disney's Early Years, 1919–1928 by Timothy S. Susanin, with a foreword written by Diane Disney. The film stars Thomas Ian Nicholas as Walt Disney, Armando Gutierrez as Ub Iwerks, and Jon Heder as Roy Disney.

The film covers Walt Disney's early years in business, during which he started various businesses including Laugh-O-Gram Studio and The Walt Disney Company with fellow animator Ub Iwerks and his brother, Roy Disney. The film received mixed-to-negative reviews by critics.

== Plot ==
The film is narrated periodically by Walt Disney. At the age of thirteen, he develops a love for animation and film. In 1919, after returning from his time with the Red Cross, Walt moves in with his older brother Roy and his girlfriend Edna, in Kansas City. Roy later moves to California, staying in a veterans hospital to deal with tuberculosis. Walt is hired as an artist at Pesmen-Rubin Commercial Art Studio, meeting Ub Iwerks. However, Walt and Iwerks are made redundant weeks after when the company's revenue declines.

Walt and Iwerks found their own business, Iwerks-Disney Commercial Artists, located in an old barn. They are joined by animators Fred and Hugh Harman, and come up with the "Laugh-O-Grams" to show in Frank L. Newman's theatres. With help from new investors, the Laugh-O-Gram Studio is founded. Walt hires new staff including Friz Freleng and Rudy Ising. The studio struggles financially, and Walt is unable to pay his animators, or keep up his rent. Walt finds solace in a mouse occupying the studio, and contacts New York City-based distributor Margaret Winkler, pitching her a live action-animated Alice series, which Winkler approves of. However, Laugh-O-Gram Studios goes bankrupt shortly after.

Walt moves to Los Angeles in 1923, living with his relatives, relying on Roy for financial support. Walt finishes work on the original Alice film, which is approved by Winkler and her husband Charles Mintz. Walt and Roy found the Disney Brothers Studio in 1923, hiring Iwerks and the other animators. Lillian Bounds is hired as an ink artist, Walt eventually falling love with her, and they marry in 1925. Roy also marries Edna. The Alice Comedies are produced, starring Virginia Davis, distributed by Mintz. Mintz, unconfident in Walt's abilities, sends his brother-in-law, George Winkler, to supervise the studio. It also becomes apparent that Mintz continues to own the rights to all of the studio's creations.

The Alice Comedies come to an end, and Walt and Iwerks create Oswald the Lucky Rabbit for Universal Studios. Guessing that the Disney brothers are running out of money, George begins talking with the animators, inviting them to join Mintz' new studio for better payment. Iwerks is the only one who refuses the offer. Walt and Lillian travel to New York, hoping to negotiate for a larger fee to make the Oswald shorts. Walt discovers a new contract would surrender all ownership of the Disney studios to Mintz, whose distributor Universal already owns the rights to Oswald, and learns his animators have left. Refusing to agree to the terms, Walt leaves Mintz and Oswald behind.

On the train back to Los Angeles, Walt is inspired to create a new character which he owns the rights to. He and Iwerks subsequently create Mickey Mouse. In 1928, Mickey's first short Plane Crazy is screened, and met with a round of applause. Walt, Roy, and Iwerks exit the theatre in celebration, Walt spotting the mouse from the Laugh-O-Gram Studio, reminding him of how far he has come. Insertions during the end credits detail the success Walt, Roy, Iwerks, and the other animators would go on to have in their own careers.

== Cast ==
- Thomas Ian Nicholas as Walt Disney
  - Owen Teague as Young Walt Disney
  - Demitri Vardoulias as Young Walt Disney
- Jon Heder as Roy Disney
  - Noah Forgione as Young Roy Disney
- Armando Gutierrez as Ub Iwerks
- David Henrie as Rudy Ising
- Taylor Gray as Friz Freleng
- Jodie Sweetin as Charlotte Disney
- Hunter Gomez as Hugh Harman
- Ayla Kell as Bridget
- Arthur L. Bernstein as Frank L. Newman
- Kate Katzman as Lillian Disney
- Frank Licari as George Winkler
- Conor Dubin as Charles Mintz
- Flora Bonfanti as Margaret Winkler
- Briana Colman as Ruth Disney
- Beatrice Taveras as Virginia Davis
- Maralee Thompson as Dawn Paris
- Natasha Sherritt as Edna Disney
- Timothy Williams as Fred Harman
- Sheena Colette as Dessie
- Randy Molnar as Uncle Robert Disney
- Donn Lamkin as Elias Disney
- Nancy J. Barber as Flora Call Disney

== Production ==
The majority of the filming took place in DeLand and Orlando, Florida. In an interview with the Kansas City Star, director Khoa Le talked about the challenges of the project, having been hired at the last minute to direct and having little familiarity with Disney himself. He mentioned, '"I came from a short film background, indie stuff, so I knew how to work efficiently," Le said. "I'm an editor, too, so I was shooting to edit. For most scenes the actors got only two takes. I had to go back to my grassroots of guerrilla filmmaking."'

== Soundtrack ==
The song "Just a Wish" was written and recorded especially for the film. It appears at the end of the film and over the credits, sung by Julie Zorrilla, American Idol finalist and written by Andrew Capra, Rob Graves and Jeremy Rubolino. It was released as an iTunes and digital single August 12, 2015.

== Release ==
The film premiered at AMC Theatres Downtown Disney in Orlando and continued its nationwide release in AMC, Cobb, Harkins, Marcus, Logan, and other theatre chains.

== Reception ==
On the review aggregator website Rotten Tomatoes, 20% of 5 critics' reviews are positive.

Cameron Meier of the Orlando Weekly gave the film one out of five stars. He praised the filmmakers' intentions, but criticized the production's rather low budget and execution, remarking, "...[the film is] conceived nobly but executed poorly by people who fell short of their dream." Scott Renshaw of the Salt Lake City Weekly gave the film one and a half stars, criticizing the creative team for "the decision to douse everything in a twinkly, romanticized tone that probably struck the filmmakers as apropos for Disney's life, but in fact loses all that was spiky and determined about the man".

Common Sense Media gave the film two stars, remarking that, "Few visionaries are as fascinating as Walt Disney, so it's particularly frustrating that this drama is so uninspired. It seems more like an adaptation of a student's book report than a compelling look at one of the most influential men of the 20th century." Pop culture site NukeTheFridge, which gave it an 8/10 rating, proclaimed, "Where this film does great at is the fact that it's relatable. Let's face it, most or none of us have our own billion dollar companies but the fact that Walt and his animators struggled financially and failed to have others believe in their dream, is something we can all relate to."

== See also ==
- Saving Mr. Banks – Another film dealing with Disney history, specifically about the making of Mary Poppins.
- Walt: The Man Behind the Myth – A 2001 documentary on the life of Walt Disney.
