= Charlie Hamblett =

English actor

- Education: Warwick School
- Occupation: Actor
- Years active: 2011–present

Charlie Hamblett is an English stage and screen actor.

== Career ==
Hamblett began his career on stage in the Royal Shakespeare Company's The Histories Cycle, directed by Michael Boyd. His stage work includes a production of The Tempest alongside Ralph Feinnes and Trevor Nunn in 2011, and Brecht's The Resistible Rise of Arturo Ui at the Duchess Theatre, London in 2013.

In 2016, he appeared in The Secret Agent television series alongside Toby Jones. Hamblett also played Sebastian in the first series of Killing Eve.

He could be seen in a recurring role in 2023 television series The Burning Girls, as Benjamin Grady. As well as portraying Benoit in 2023 BBC One murder comedy Boat Story. That year, he made a guest appearance as a French interpreter on BBC One sitcom Ghosts.

He played British racing driver Martin Brundle in 2024 production Senna. That year, he portrayed a version of writer Laurie Lee on stage in a touring production with The Orchestra of the Swan of the play Red Sky at Sunrise, alongside Anton Lesser.

He could be seen as Charlie Parker in 2025 in Harlan Coben adaptation Missing You for Netflix. He appears alongside Christoph Waltz in Simon West action comedy film Old Guy.

== Personal life ==
He grew up in Stratford-upon-Avon, and both his parents worked in theatre. His sister Olivia is an actress. He attended Warwick School between 2004 and 2011. He was previously in a relationship with actress Daisy Ridley.

== Filmography ==
Year	Title	Role	Notes
2014	Babylon	Mickey	1 episode
2016	The Secret Agent	Stevie	All episodes
2018	Macbeth	Malcolm	
2018	Killing Eve	Sebastian	1 episode
2018	Fast Forward	Jack	1 episode
2019	Grantchester	Tim	1 episode
2020	Brave New World	Marco Hoover	1 episode
2020	The Queen's Gambit	Derek	1 episode
2021	Ladhood	Rob	1 episode
2021	Around the World in 80 Days	Lieutenant Bathurst	1 episode
2023	Mrs Sidhu Investigates	Artie Melville	1 episode
2023	Ghosts	Garion	1 episodes
2023	The Burning Girls	Benjamin Grady	6 episodes
2023	Boat Story	Benoit	2 episodes
2024	FBI: International	Maarten Van Hagen	1 episode
2024	Old Guy	Opal’s assistant	
2024	Senna	Martin Brundle	2 episodes
2025	Missing You	Charlie Pitts	All episodes
