= Lorenzo James Henrie =

American actor (born 1993)

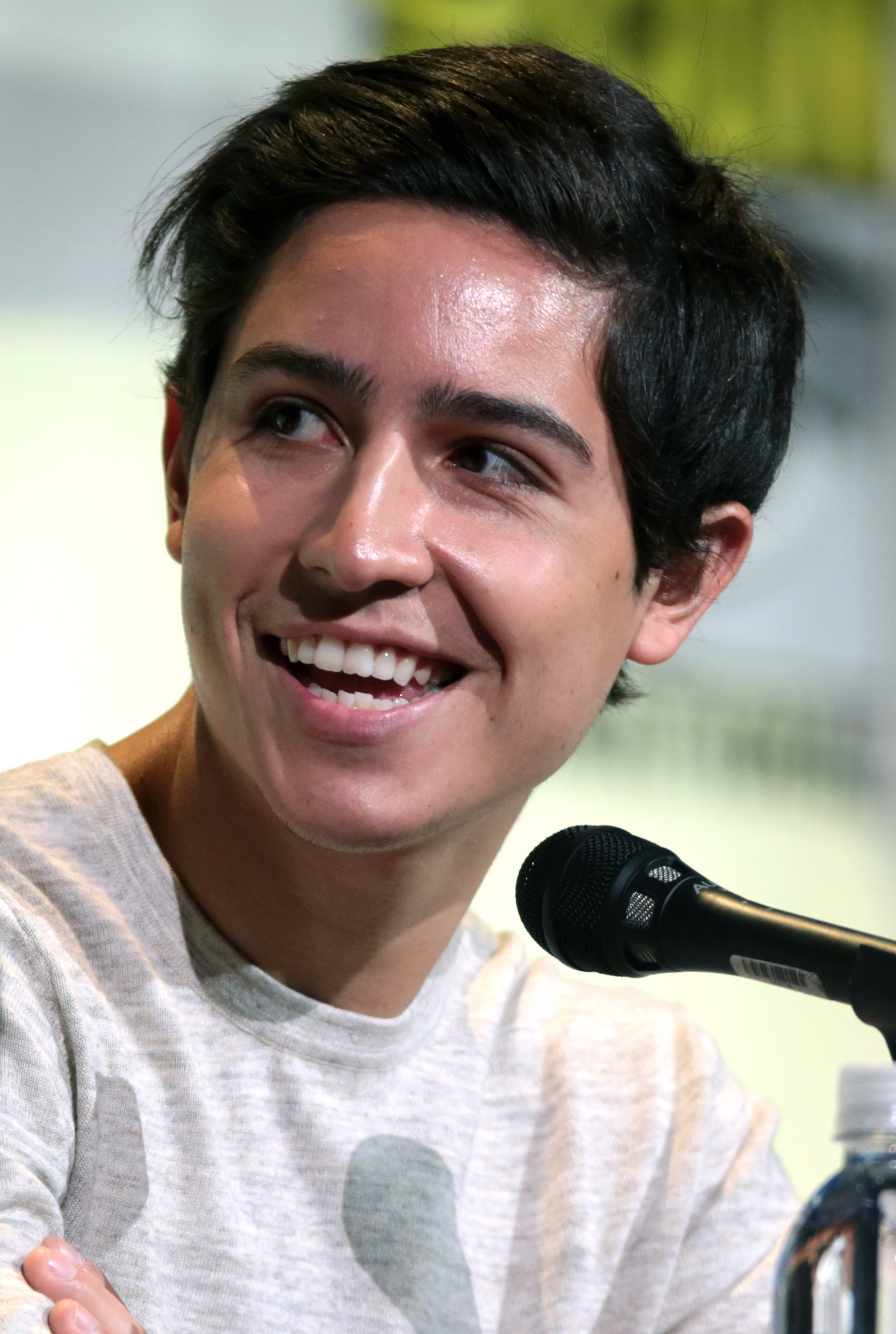
- Henrie at the 2016 San Diego Comic-Con
- Born: June 29, 1993 (age 33); Phoenix, Arizona, U.S.
- Occupation: Actor
- Years active: 2004–present
- Relatives: David Henrie (brother)

Lorenzo James Henrie (born June 29, 1993) is an American actor. He is best known for his role as Chris Manawa on the AMC television series Fear the Walking Dead (2015–2016) and his lead role in This Is the Year (2020).

== Early life ==
Henrie was born in Phoenix, Arizona, to Linda (née Finocchiaro), a talent manager, and James Wilson Henrie, a producer formerly in real estate. His older brother is actor David Henrie. Henrie is a practicing Roman Catholic.

== Career ==
In 2015, Henrie appeared in the comedy film Paul Blart: Mall Cop 2. He also played one of the lead roles as Christopher Manawa in the first two seasons of AMC's series Fear the Walking Dead.

In 2024, Henrie worked as an executive producer on the film Monster Summer, directed by his brother David Henrie.

== Filmography ==
=== Film ===
Year	Title	Role
2004	Arizona Summer	Jerry
2009	Star Trek	Vulcan Bully
2010	Almost Kings	Ted Wheeler
2014	Riding 79	Migue
2015	Paul Blart: Mall Cop 2	Lorenzo
2016	Warrior Road	Joseph
2019	Only Mine	Tommy
2020	This Is the Year	Josh
2027	The Resurrection of the Christ: Part One	Judas Thaddeus

=== Television ===
Year	Title	Role	Notes
2004	Malcolm in the Middle	Boy	1 episode
2004	7th Heaven	Jeffrey Turner	6 episodes
2004	LAX	Cody	1 episode
2005	Ghost Whisperer	Rat	1 episode
2005	Wanted	Eric Pretatorio	1 episode
2006	Cold Case	Young Mike Valens	2 episodes
2007	CSI: Miami	Justin Montavo	1 episode
2010	NCIS: Los Angeles	Evan Maragos	1 episode
2014	An American Education	Carlos	1 episode
2015–2016	Fear the Walking Dead	Christopher "Chris" Manawa	Main role; 16 episodes
2016	Agents of S.H.I.E.L.D.	Gabe Reyes	4 episodes
2018	Kevin Can Wait	Anthony	1 episode

== Awards and nominations ==
Year	Award	Category	Nominated work	Result
2004	25th Young Artist Awards	Best Performance in a Feature Film – Young Actor Age Ten or Younger	Arizona Summer	Nominated
2017	43rd Saturn Awards	Best Performance by a Younger Actor in a Television Series	Fear the Walking Dead	Nominated
