= Guy Montgomery =

Comedian from New Zealand (born 1988)

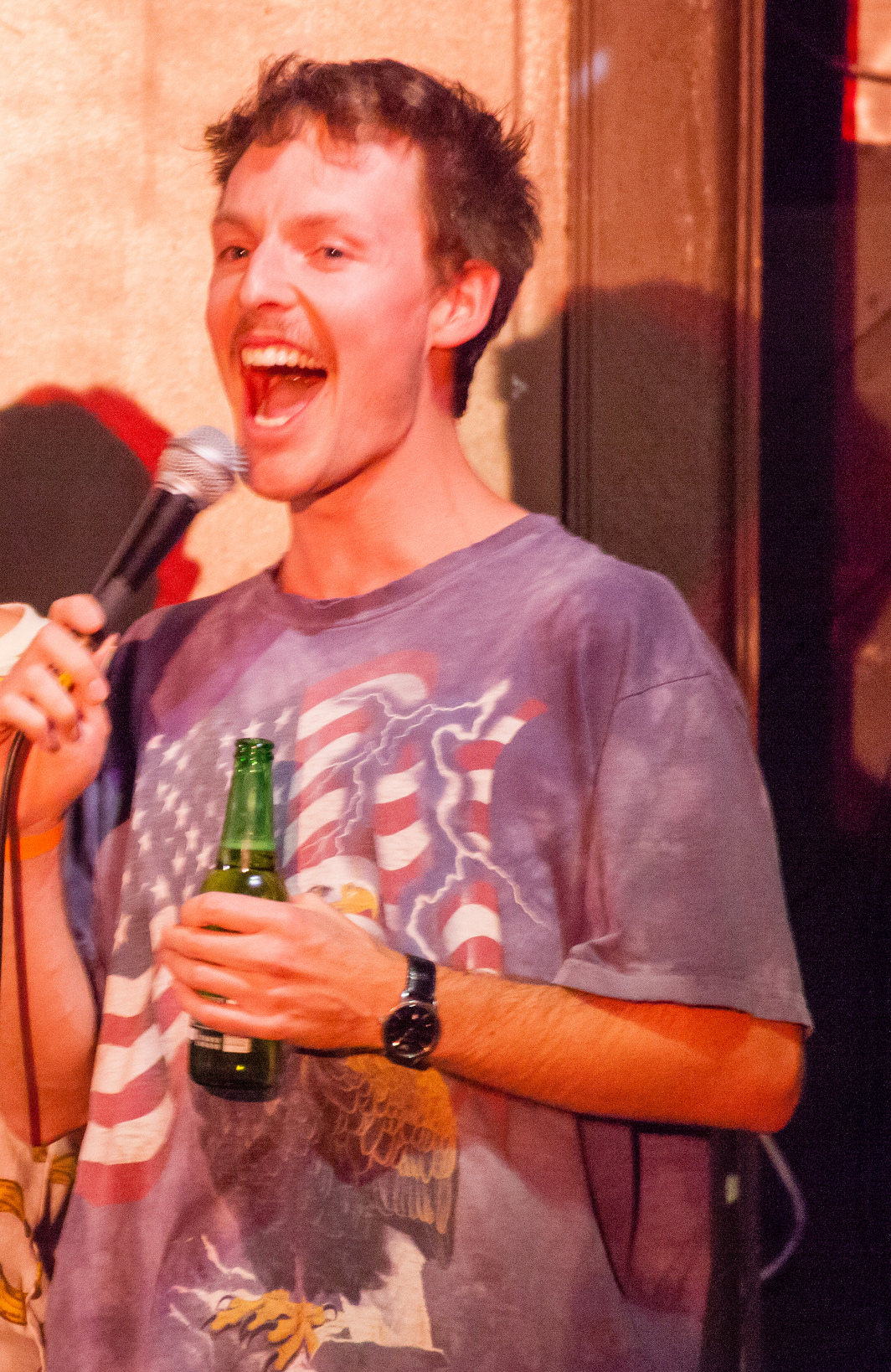
- Montgomery in 2016
- Born: 29 September 1988 (age 38); Wellington, New Zealand
- Education: Victoria University of Wellington (BA, theatre, film, and media)
- Occupations: Comedian; podcaster
- Known for: The Worst Idea of All Time 'Til Death Do Us Blart; Guy Montgomery's Guy Mont-Spelling Bee; Guy Montgomery's Guy Mont-Spelling Bee (Australia)
- Awards: Billy T Award (2014); Fred Award (2023); Logie Award for Most Popular New Talent (2025)

Comedy career
- Years active: 2011–present
- Medium: Podcasts; television; improv; stand-up
- Genre: Observational

Guy Montgomery (born 29 September 1988) is a comedian from New Zealand. He is known for his panel game show Guy Montgomery's Guy Mont-Spelling Bee, which he began as a web series before becoming a TV series, for Three in New Zealand, and later, adapted to an Australian version for the ABC. He is also known for his long-running podcast series, The Worst Idea of All Time, created with friend and fellow New Zealand comedian Tim Batt. He has won two New Zealand comedy prizes: the Billy T Award in 2014 and Fred Award in 2023. Montgomery won the Australian Silver Logie Award for Most Popular New Talent in 2025 for the ABC's version of Guy Mont-Spelling Bee.

== Early life and career ==
Montgomery was born in Wellington, New Zealand on 29 September 1988. At a young age, Montgomery's family moved to Sydney and back to Wellington before settling in Christchurch. He has an older and younger sister. Montgomery studied at Victoria University of Wellington, from which he graduated with a bachelor of arts in theatre, film, and media. He briefly considered becoming a teacher or working in advertising.

To begin his career in comedy, Montgomery moved to Canada in 2010 — first Montreal, and then Toronto, which had more open mic nights. He explained in an interview, "Every comedian starts off shit. I wanted to make sure I wasn't shit in front of my friends." Reflecting on the time in 2024, he said that "it was such an incredible year, and I do think it's probably made me". Montgomery returned to New Zealand in part to co-host U Late. He later moved to New York City.

== Podcasts and radio ==
The Worst Idea of All Time was started in 2014 by Montgomery and Tim Batt. The podcast follows them as they report upon the viewing experience of re-watching the same movie each week for a year. The first season was focused on the Adam Sandler movie Grown Ups 2; the second on Sex and the City 2; the third season on We Are Your Friends; and the fourth on the first Sex and the City film. After the onset of the COVID-19 pandemic in 2020, the duo did an "emergency season" in which they watched the film Home Alone 3 every three days until their local New Zealand lockdown orders were lifted. The fifth season began in 2020, with Batt and Montgomery reviewing the French–American Emmanuelle series of softcore pornography films. The sixth season features the Fast and Furious franchise, said to be the final season.

They also record Friendzone, dedicated to answering fan mail.

Montgomery and Batt are also co-hosts of 'Til Death Do Us Blart, a once-yearly, "eternal" Paul Blart: Mall Cop 2 review podcast hosted in conjunction with the McElroy brothers of comedy podcast My Brother, My Brother, and Me, that airs every American Thanksgiving. The podcast operates under the principle that each of the five hosts chooses and then annually confirms a successor, who, in the case of the timely or untimely death of one of the founding hosts, will take over the empty spot. This is to ensure the podcast can run, uninterrupted, until the end of linear time.

=== Podcasts ===
| Year | Title | Role | Notes | Source |
|---|---|---|---|---|
| 2015–2024 | The Worst Idea of All Time | Himself | Host | |
| 2015 | 'Til Death Do Us Blart | Himself | Host | |
| 2016 | Friendzone | Himself | Host | |
| 2018–2021 | Overlooked & Undercooked | Himself | | |
| 2024 | Between Two Beers | Himself | | |
| 2018–2019 | Stand by Your Band | Himself | 4 episodes | |
| 2017–2019 | Vic & Em's Comedy Gems | Himself | 2 episodes | |
| 2018–2019 | Dating Badly | Himself | 2 episodes | |
| 2018–2019 | The Phone Hacks | Himself | 2 episodes | |
| 2019 | RN Drive | Himself | "Let's Get Quizzical - Guy Montgomery vs DeAnne Smith" | |
| 2019 | Don't You Know Who I Am? | Himself | Episode #148 | |
| 2015–2019 | The Last Video Store | Himself | 3 episodes | |
| 2019 | A Little Time | Himself | Episode #49: "Waiting For A Mate with Guy Montgomery" | |
| 2019 | Only the Best for Laura Jacoves | Himself | Episode #146: "The Great Dictator (1940) with Guy Montgomery and Birgit Rathsmann" | |
| 2019 | Live To Tape with Johnny Pemberton | Himself | Episode #96: "Guy Montgomery" | |
| 2018 | Everything Is Rent | Himself | "I Should Tell You with Guy Montgomery" | |
| 2018 | Who Invited Me? | Himself | Episode #18: "Guy Montgomery!" | |

== Stand-up and live shows ==
Montgomery's 2014 show Presents a Succinct and Concise Summary of How He Feels About Certain Things won the Billy T Award.

Montgomery and Rose Matafeo co-headlined a show at the Edinburgh Fringe Festival in 2015, titled Rose Matafeo and Guy Montgomery Are Friends.

He performed Guy Montcomedy in 2015 in Auckland, and then in 2016 at the Melbourne International Comedy Festival. This was followed by Guy Montgomery Christmas! at the 2016 NZICF.

At the 2017 NZ International Comedy Festival, Montgomery was nominated for the Fred Award for Let's All Get in a Room Together.

His show Guy Montgomery Doesn't Check His Phone For An Hour played at the Melbourne International Comedy Festival in 2018, which explored his move to New York. He and others from the MICF toured India for a month that year. He presented I'm Friends With These People! in New York in early 2019, featuring Rachel Sennott, Pat Regan, Rachel Pegram, Cam Spence, and Joe Pera.

In 2019, Montgomery presented his sixth solo show, I Was Part Of The Problem Before We Were Talking About It, at the Edinburgh Fringe Festival; he described it as "about personal growth and reconciling who I am today with all the iterations of myself I've been throughout the years".

He presented Guy Montgomery By Name, Guy Montgomery By Nature at the NZICF in 2021, and later took the show around New Zealand.

His show My Brain is Blowing Me Crazy premiered in 2023 and won the Fred Award at the New Zealand International Comedy Festival. In May 2024, Montgomery went on tour with a new show, 50,000,000 Guy Fans Can't be Wrong.

Montgomery is also a member of the improv group Snort.

== Television and film ==
Montgomery's first appearance on TV was on the TVNZ U channel, where from 2011 he was a fill-in host on U Live and later hosted the "interactive" 2013 show U late alongside Tim Lambourne. He wanted the show, which aired on weeknights on TVNZ U, to "fill the void that's been left by Eating Media Lunch, Moon TV, [and] Back of the Y". He and Lambourne had previously worked together at George FM on the show Monty and the Face.

From U late, where he first met his podcast partner Tim Batt, Montgomery moved into writing for several different comedy shows in New Zealand, such as Jono and Ben at 10. Montgomery was also a writer and presenter of Fail Army. He appeared on Cadbury Dream Factory in 2014.

Montgomery co-wrote (with producer and director Ryan Heron) and starred in the short film Return, which won Best Screenplay at the 2015 Show Me Shorts film festival. Return later screened at the 2015 Clermont-Ferrand International Short Film Festival.

In 2017, Montgomery and Tim Batt recorded a pilot episode of a The Worst Idea of All Time TV series for YouTube Red, in which they spent five days in a New York City sewer watching Teenage Mutant Ninja Turtles: Out of the Shadows. The show was never ordered to series.

Montgomery appeared on the 2020 May the 4th fundraiser episode of The George Lucas Talk Show, titled The George Lucas Talk Show All Day Star Wars Movie Watch Along. He was also co-host of Survive the 80s.

In 2021, Montgomery took part in series two of Taskmaster NZ and he appeared on the panel show Patriot Brains.

Montgomery was a contestant on the 2022 series of the New Zealand reality television show Celebrity Treasure Island, and was the first player to be eliminated. His chosen charity had been Auckland City Mission. He has also appeared frequently on panel and game shows such as 7 Days, Best Bits, Have You Been Paying Attention?, and Thank God You're Here.

In 2023, Montgomery's television show Guy Montgomery's Guy Mont-Spelling Bee premiered in New Zealand. An Australian version was aired by the ABC in August 2024.

He is set to appear in the upcoming animated series Badjelly, based on the picture book Badjelly the Witch (1973).

=== Television ===
| Year | Title | Role | Notes | Source |
|---|---|---|---|---|
| 2011 | U Live | Fill-in host | | |
| 2013 | U late | Co-host | | |
| 2013–2015 | Best Bits | Himself | Various episodes | |
| 2014 | Cadbury Dream Factory | Himself | | |
| 2015 | Chopper's Republic of Anzakistan | English Captain | | |
| 2015 | Fail Army | Presenter | Also writer | |
| 2017 | The Worst Idea of All Time | Himself | Unaired YouTube Red pilot | |
| 2018 | Tonightly with Tom Ballard | Himself | Episode 86 | |
| 2019–2025 | 7 Days | Himself | Various episodes | |
| 2019–2020 | The Drawing Show | Mark | | |
| 2020 | The George Lucas Talk Show | Himself | "The George Lucas Talk Show All Day Star Wars Movie Watch Along" | |
| 2020 | Survive the 80s | Himself | | |
| 2020–2021 | Bigtop Burger | Customer | 2 episodes | |
| 2020–2022 | Have You Been Paying Attention? (New Zealand) | Himself | Various episodes | |
| 2020 | Golden Boy | | Series 2, episode 7: "The Report" | |
| 2021 | Taskmaster NZ | Himself | Series 2 | |
| 2021 | Patriot Brains | Himself | | |
| 2022 | Celebrity Treasure Island 2022 | Himself | | |
| 2022–2025 | Have You Been Paying Attention? | Himself | Various episodes | |
| 2023 | Double Parked | Brett | Series 1, episode 8 | |
| 2023–2024 | Thank God You're Here | Various roles | Various episodes | |
| 2023–2024 | Guy Montgomery's Guy Mont-Spelling Bee | Host | Also creator, producer, writer | |
| 2024 | Guy Montgomery's Guy Mont-Spelling Bee (Australia) | Host | Also creator, producer, writer | |
| 2024 | The Weekly with Charlie Pickering | Himself | Season 10, episode 11 | |
| 2025 | Badjelly | Voice | | |

=== Film ===
| Year | Title | Role | Notes | Source |
|---|---|---|---|---|
| 2015 | Return | Dominic | Short film; also co-writer | |
| 2018 | The Breaker Upperers | Waiter | | |
| 2018 | Vermilion | Frank | | |
| 2020 | Baby Done | Treemasters Official | | |

== Awards and nominations ==
In 2014, Montgomery won the Billy T Award for his show Presents a Succinct and Concise Summary of How He Feels About Certain Things.

He won the Fred Award in 2023 for his show My Brain is Blowing Me Crazy. The show also won "Best of the Fest" at the 2023 Sydney Comedy Festival.

Montgomery won the Graham Kennedy Award for Most Popular New Talent at the 2025 Logie Awards.

== Personal life ==
Montgomery's partner is actress Chelsie Preston Crayford. They have one child, born in September 2025.
