= Bookworm (film) =

2024 New Zealand comedy drama film

- Theatrical release poster
- Directed by: Ant Timpson
- Screenplay by: Toby Harvard
- Story by: Toby Harvard; Ant Timpson
- Produced by: Emma Slade; Roxi Bull; Victoria Dabbs; Mette-Marie Kongsved; Laura Turnstall
- Starring: Elijah Wood; Michael Smiley; Nell Fisher
- Cinematography: Daniel Katz
- Edited by: Daniel Kircher
- Music by: Karyn Rachtman; Karl Steven
- Production companies: New Zealand Film Commission; Talon Entertainment Finance; Orogen Entertainment; Mister Smith Entertainment; Kiwibank; Firefly Films
- Distributed by: Rialto Distribution
- Release dates: 18 July 2024 (Fantasia); 8 August 2024 (New Zealand)
- Running time: 96 minutes
- Country: New Zealand
- Language: English
- Box office: $552,668

Bookworm is a 2024 New Zealand adventure comedy drama film directed by Ant Timpson from a screenplay by Toby Harvard, based on a story by Timpson and Harvard. It stars Elijah Wood and Nell Fisher. The film follows a young girl embarking on an adventure with her estranged American father to seek out the mythical Canterbury panther.

Bookworm had its premiere at the 28th Fantasia International Film Festival on 18 July 2024 and was released in New Zealand by Rialto Distribution on 8 August. The film received positive reviews from critics.

== Plot ==
Mildred is a bookish 11-year-old girl who lives with her mother in New Zealand and is interested in the Canterbury panther. One night, an exploding toaster puts her mother into a coma. Mildred's magician father Strawn arrives from the United States, but Mildred is upset with him for his absence from her life and is unimpressed by his magic tricks. Strawn agrees to take Mildred on a camping trip in the Canterbury Region, during which Mildred hopes to capture footage of the panther. The reward for such footage is NZ$50,000, enough to pay off Mildred's mother's debts.

Mildred and Strawn find the panther drinking from a stream, and Mildred films it on her video camera. Strawn and Mildred then meet a pair of hikers who give their names as Arnold and Angelina and begin travelling with them. Arnold robs Strawn, taking Strawn's phone and wallet and Mildred's camera. Arnold reveals that "Arnold" and "Angelina" are pseudonyms to discourage Strawn from going to the police. Arnold and Angelina then depart. The next day, Strawn and Mildred come across Arnold and Angelina arguing in their tent. Mildred steals Arnold's bag, and she and Strawn run away. Mildred finds her camera in Arnold's bag but discovers that Arnold and Angelina have filmed over her panther footage.

The panther approaches Strawn and Mildred at the edge of a chasm, and the duo begin crossing the chasm on a rope to escape. The panther claws through the rope, and Strawn and Mildred fall into the chasm. When Strawn regains consciousness, he finds that Mildred's legs are trapped under a log. He gives her a hallucinogenic mushroom to ease the pain and, just moments after she calls him Dad for the first time, lifts the log off of her legs.

As Strawn carries Mildred away, she tells him that she loves him, before passing out. They again come across Arnold and Angelina, this time arguing beside a van. Strawn places Mildred in the back seat and steals the van. As he drives down the road, he turns around to film Mildred on his phone. Mildred urges him to watch the road, and when he turns around, he sees the panther in the road and swerves to avoid it, crashing the van. Mildred wakes up to find herself in the hospital, between her parents' hospital beds. It is then revealed that Strawn caught a brief clear shot of the panther on his phone just before the crash, allowing Mildred to claim the reward.

== Cast ==
- Elijah Wood as Strawn Wise
- Michael Smiley as Arnold
- Nell Fisher as Mildred
- Stewie as Jonesy the Cat

In addition, Vanessa Stacey portrays Angelina, while Morgana O'Reilly has a cameo as Mildred's mother, Zo.

== Production ==
=== Development and writing ===
Bookworm was directed by Ant Timpson and written by Toby Harvard. Timpson and Harvard envisioned Bookworm as a wilderness film that drew on their "insecurities as parents." During an interview with Radio New Zealand, collaborator and cast member Elijah Wood said that "the genesis of Bookworm was really not stepping up in a time of crisis as a parent, and basically pooing the bed in front of your kids." Wood also said the film plot was inspired by stories of the Canterbury panther, a phantom cat said to inhabit the Canterbury Plains.

=== Casting ===
Miranda Rivers served as casting director. Wood was cast as the American illusionist and father Strawn Wise. Wood had previously collaborated with Timpson and Harvard in the 2019 black comedy thriller film Come to Daddy. Harvard had written the character of Strawn Wise with Wood in mind. Child actor Nell Fisher was cast as his estranged New Zealand daughter Mildred. Fisher was selected from among 300 children who had auditioned for the role.

Morgana O'Reilly was cast as Mildred's single mother Zo. Other supporting cast members included Michael Smiley as Arnold, Nikki Si'ulepa as Dotty, Vanessa Stacey as Angelina, Theo Shakes as Reginald and Millen Baird as Doctor. Timpson compared Stacey's character to an Enid Blyton villain while Stacey compared her character to a Roald Dahl creation.

=== Filming ===
Bookworm was filmed in the Canterbury Region's MacKenzie Basin, Lake Coleridge, Flock Hill, New Zealand, Castle Hill, New Zealand and the Hawdon River over a period of two months in 2023. Daniel Katz, who had previously collaborated with Timpson in Come to Daddy, served as the film's cinematographer. The film's producers were Emma Slade, Roxi Bull, Victoria Dabbs, Mette-Marie Kongsved and Laura Turnstall.

The film was produced by Firefly Films. It also received funding from the New Zealand Film Commission, the New Zealand Screen Production Rebate, Talon Entertainment, Orogen Entertainment, Screen Canterbury, Images and Sound, Mister Smith Entertainment and KiwiBank.

== Release ==
Bookworm premiered internationally at the 28th Fantasia International Film Festival in Montreal, Canada on 18 July 2024. The film was distributed in New Zealand and Australia by Rialto Distribution, receiving its general release in New Zealand on 8 August 2024 and in Australia on 29 August 2024. The film was screened at the 2024 Melbourne International Film Festival on 17 August 2024, prior to its showing at the 25th FrightFest film festival on 23 August 2024. It also screened as the closing gala presentation at the 2024 Cinéfest Sudbury International Film Festival on 22 September 2024.

Bookworm was distributed by Vertical Entertainment and Photon Film, in the United States and Canada respectively, on 18 October 2024.

== Reception ==
=== Box office ===
In the United States and Canada, Bookworm grossed $9,446, with $543,222 in other territories, for a worldwide total of $552,668.

=== Critical response ===
On the review aggregator website Rotten Tomatoes, 91% of 47 critics' reviews are positive, with an average rating of 7.2/10. The website's consensus reads: "Recapturing the magic of vintage adventure yarns, Bookworm is an imaginative gem with a wholesome heart." Metacritic, which uses a weighted average, assigned the film a score of 64 out of 100, based on 10 critics, indicating "generally favorable" reviews.

Alison Foreman of IndieWire gave Bookworm a positive review, giving the film an A minus grade. She wrote "fearlessly specific in its comedy and just as attentive with its character arcs, this algebraic study in adventure might have a metaphoric typo or two (insert obligatory comment about CGI), but it's mostly a triumph." Foreman also praised the parent-child relationship between Elijah Wood and Nell Fisher's characters. She also praised the cinematographer Daniel Katz for immersing Wood and Fisher's characters in the "breathtaking" New Zealand environment. Foreman also praised the performance of Michael Smiley.

Tomris Laffly of Variety gave Bookworm a positive review, describing it as "a delightfully quirky father-daughter adventure with the perfect blend of childlike wonder and grown-up bite." Laffly praised Toby Harvard's script for exploring the themes of family, fatherhood and adventure. She also praised cinematographer Daniel Katz for capturing the relationship between the two characters and the natural scenery. Laffly also praised the performances of Wood and Fisher.

== Accolades ==
In August 2024, the film won the Audience Award: Gold for Best International Feature at the 28th Fantasia International Film Festival.
