= Estonian Australians =

Ethnic group in Australia

Eestlased Austraalias (Estonian)

Total population
- 2,665 (by birth, 2021 Census); 11,598 (by ancestry, 2021 census)

Regions with significant populations
- Estonian Ancestry by state or territory
- New South Wales: 4,265
- Victoria: 2,408
- Queensland: 1,916
- Western Australia: 1,374

Languages
- Australian English · Estonian

Religion
- Christianity (Predominantly Lutheranism)

Related ethnic groups
- Finnish Australians, Estonian Americans

Estonian Australians (Estonian: Eestlased Austraalias) refers to Australian citizens of Estonian descent or Estonia-born persons who reside in Australia. According to the 2021 Census, there were 11,598 people of Estonian descent in Australia and 2,665 Estonia-born people residing in the country at the moment of the census, having an increase of 21 per cent compared to the 2016 Census. The largest Estonia-born community in Australia is in the state of New South Wales, with 4,265 people.

From 1940 to 1944, more than 70,000 Estonians fled to the West due to the Soviet and German occupations. Many settled in Australia. The first voyage under Arthur Calwell's Displaced Persons immigration program, that of the USS General Stuart Heintzelman in 1947, was specially chosen to be all from Baltic nations, all single, many blond and blue-eyed, in order to appeal to the Australian public. Of the 843 immigrants on the Heintzelman, 142 were Estonian.

== Notable people of Estonian descent ==
- Alyla Browne, actress
- Aivi Luik, professional footballer
- Armin Öpik, geologist
- Arvi Parbo, chairman of BHP
- Peeter Pedaja, adventurer
- Vicki Viidikas, poet
- Dane Rampe, AFL player for the Sydney Swans
- Erik Paartalu, professional footballer
- Anna Torv, actress
- Selena Uibo, politician and Leader of the Opposition in the Northern Territory

== See also ==
- Australia–Estonia relations
- Europeans in Oceania
- European Australians
- Immigration to Australia
- Estonian Canadians
- Estonian Americans
