= Canterbury Panther =

New Zealand urban legend

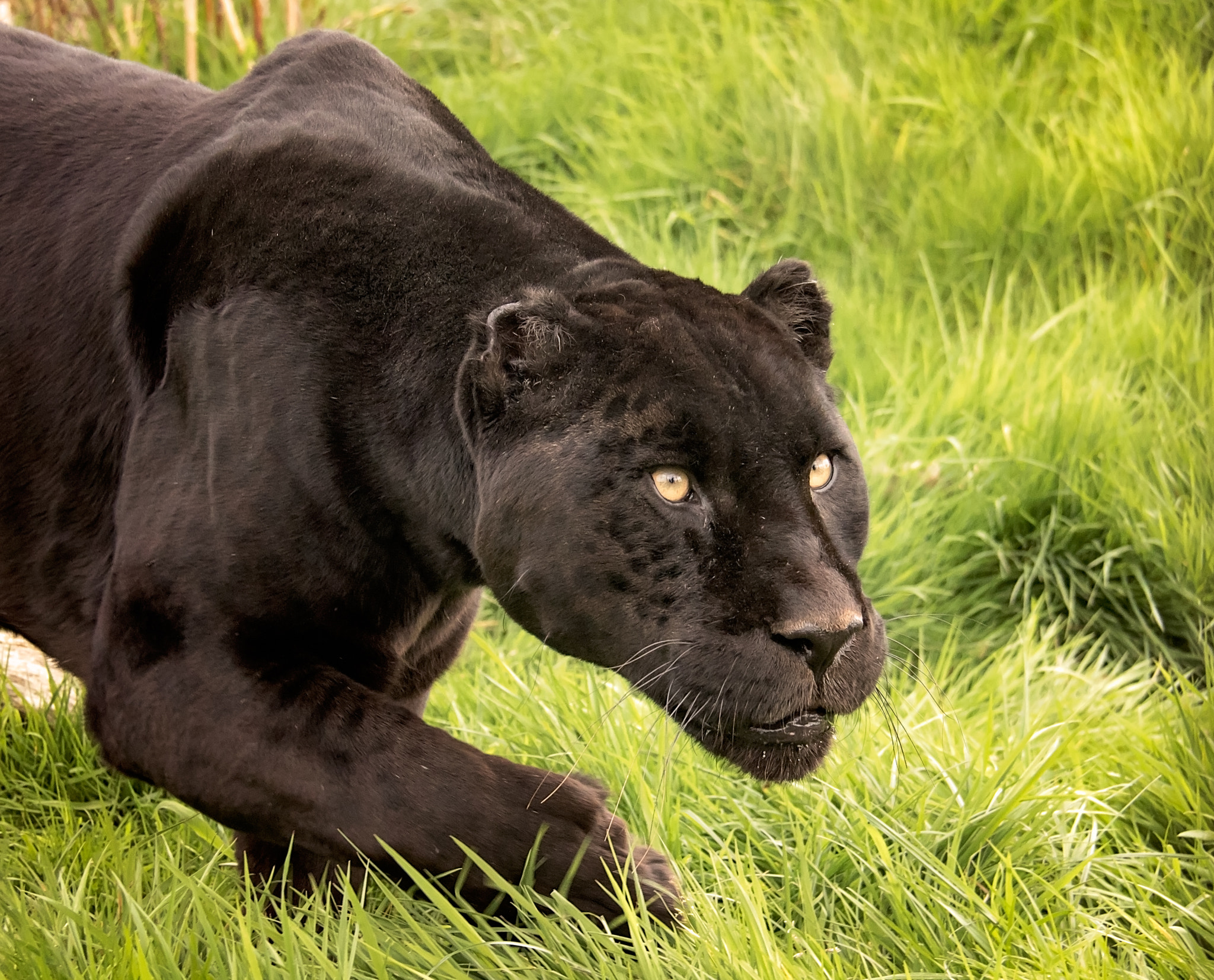
A black panther

The Canterbury Panther or Canterbury Cat is a New Zealand urban legend about a black panther which is said to live in the Canterbury Region. Sightings of the animal go back to before the 1970s.

== History ==
The Canterbury Panther first made headlines in July 1977, when Kaiapoi resident Frances Clark alleged that she had seen a tiger outside her home. She did not originally plan to report the incident, as she was in disbelief of the event, but became increasingly worried about the possibility of the cat attacking school children later in the morning. After the local police were informed, they amassed a search party with assistance from the Orana Wildlife Park, as it was believed the animal could have escaped from their zoo, though all their big cats were later accounted for. As the search failed to produce any evidence of a tiger in the area, Clark was promptly ridiculed by the public for presumably lying to police, until paw prints and animal droppings were discovered in Pines Beach, close to Clark's home. This led local authorities to start a second search for the animal, as they now genuinely believed there was a tiger on the loose.

After the second search, sightings of the Canterbury Panther would die down until the 1990s, when two separate sightings were reported in 1996 and 1999. Further searches were conducted by local authorities in 2001, 2003, and 2006.

== Proposed explanations ==
The most common explanation for sightings of the Canterbury Panther are attributed to the mistaken identity of unusually large, feral cats with black fur. After hunter Jesse Feary shot and killed what he believed was a specimen of the panther in September 2020, Dr. Shaun Wilkinson of Wilderlab offered test the animal's DNA for free. After his company tested it, Wilkinson came to the conclusion that it was not a panther or any other big cat, emailing Feary in late 2020 to state that it was "[j]ust a standard cat by the looks of the DNA."

Similar to the common explanation, it has been proposed that descriptions of the creature's size are a result of gigantism.

== In popular culture ==
The Canterbury Panther features prominently in the 2024 film Bookworm. The film's writer and director, Ant Timpson, is a self-described fan of the myth and similar urban legends, describing them as "profoundly nostalgic, in a way. They give us this sense that the world is this great, beautiful, wondrous place where anything could happen."

== See also ==
- Phantom cat
- Cats in New Zealand
