= The Kissing Bandit (film) =

1948 film

- Directed by: László Benedek
- Written by: Isobel Lennart
- Produced by: Joe Pasternak
- Starring: Frank Sinatra; Kathryn Grayson; J. Carrol Naish
- Cinematography: Robert Surtees
- Edited by: Adrienne Fazan
- Music by: George Stoll
- Color process: Technicolor
- Production company: Metro-Goldwyn-Mayer
- Distributed by: Metro-Goldwyn-Mayer
- Release date: November 18, 1948
- Running time: 100 minutes
- Country: United States
- Language: English
- Budget: $3,291,000
- Box office: $1,381,000

The Kissing Bandit is a 1948 American comedy musical Western film directed by László Benedek. It stars Frank Sinatra and Kathryn Grayson, with J. Carrol Naish in a supporting role, and Ricardo Montalbán, Ann Miller and Cyd Charisse in cameo roles.

== Plot ==
In the 19th century, Ricardo rides from Boston to California to inherit what he thinks is his deceased father's former job as an innkeeper. He is shocked to discover that the inn was a front for his father's criminal activities as "The Kissing Bandit", robbing women and kissing them before fleeing, and that he is now expected to carry on this legacy. Chico, his father's former sidekick, takes Ricardo under his wing to help him become the new Kissing Bandit.

Teresa is the local governor's daughter, reflecting on her dreams of romance as she finishes school ("Tomorrow Means Romance"). As she is escorted back to the governor's residence, Chico and Ricardo rob Teresa's carriage. After a mishap in which he falls off a cliff, Ricardo comes face to face with Teresa and he instantly falls in love but is too scared to kiss her. She later reflects on this moment, blaming herself, while Ricardo also wonders why he lacks courage ("What's Wrong with Me?").

Ricardo rides to the governor's mansion and sings "If I Steal a Kiss" beneath Teresa's balcony. The guards intercept and open fire, but Chico arrives to save Ricardo. He tells Ricardo that romantic commitment cannot be a part of a bandit's life and arranges for Bianca, a sex worker, to seduce Ricardo. She performs a dance with a bullwhip ("I Like You") and invites a kiss but he nervously rebuffs her, saying that he has to "put a flower in some water".

Count Belmonte arrives at the inn accompanied by General Torro, who is sick and frequently sneezing. Belmonte catches Ricardo and Chico attempting to plunder his luggage and a swordfight ensues that Torro sleeps through, ending with Belmonte and Torro tied up with rope. Colonel Gomez arrives at the inn searching for the Kissing Bandit, but he returns home to the governor when he is told that Belmonte and Torro are staying at the inn and are "all tied up". Ricardo finds a letter of introduction to the King in Belmonte's luggage and decides that he and Chico will visit the governor's mansion posing as Belmonte and Torro.

The ruse works, and they are welcomed to the governor's mansion. When Ricardo (posing as Belmonte) is introduced to Teresa, she recognizes him but does not say anything ("If I Steal a Kiss (Reprise)"). In a private moment, she confronts him about why he did not kiss her earlier. Chico is also planning to rob the governor's stockpile of taxes, and gives Ricardo a pep talk about women when he realizes that the Kissing Bandit's reputation will suffer otherwise. During a siesta, Ricardo attempts to shoo a fly ("Siesta").

At a fiesta in their honor, Ricardo remembers that his father abducted his mother. This gives him the idea to attempt an abduction of Teresa to prove his sincerity, which pleases her greatly ("What's Wrong with Me? (Reprise)"). A social dance is held in the courtyard ("Dance of Fury"), and while the crowd is distracted ("Señorita"), Chico attempts to raid the governor's riches. Ricardo wishes to marry her, but Chico tells him, "This is not a book, Ricardo mio. This is not a dream you are dreaming. This is a bandit's life. Hard. Sometimes very short." He reluctantly accepts that marriage is not a possibility, until he sees Teresa again ("Love is Where You Find It") and asks to dance with her just once.

The real Belmonte and Torro arrive and identify Ricardo and Chico, who are immediately arrested and are slated to be executed at dawn. Gomez visits them in jail, and they are able to confuse him enough to escape and imprison Gomez in the cell in their place. Belmonte also attempts to seduce Teresa but is interrupted by Ricardo, who fights him and wins. Fed up, Ricardo decides to return to Boston and relinquish his title as the Kissing Bandit, until he is interrupted by Teresa, who is outside under his balcony ("If I Steal a Kiss (Reprise)"). He tells her that he was never a bandit and did not inherit anything from his father, but he kisses her and she faints, implying that he is the Kissing Bandit after all.

== Cast ==
- Frank Sinatra as Ricardo
- Kathryn Grayson as Teresa
- J. Carrol Naish as Chico
- Mildred Natwick as Isabella
- Mikhail Rasumny as Don Jose
- Billy Gilbert as General Felipe Torro
- Sono Osato as Bianca
- Clinton Sundberg as Colonel Gomez
- Carleton G. Young as Count Ricardo Belmonte
- Ricardo Montalbán as Fiesta Specialty Dancer
- Ann Miller as Fiesta Specialty Dancer
- Cyd Charisse as Fiesta Specialty Dancer
- Sally Forrest as Fiesta Specialty Dancer
- Edna Skinner as Juanita
- Vicente Gómez as Mexican Guitarist
- Mitchell Lewis as Fernando (uncredited)

== Songs ==
- "Tomorrow Means Romance" (music by Nacio Herb Brown; lyrics by William Katz) – Sung by Kathryn Grayson
- "What's Wrong With Me?" (music by Nacio Herb Brown; lyrics by Earl K. Brent) – Sung by Kathryn Grayson, Frank Sinatra
- "If I Steal a Kiss" (music by Nacio Herb Brown; lyrics by Edward Heyman) – Sung by Frank Sinatra; reprised by Kathryn Grayson
- "I Like You" (music by Nacio Herb Brown; lyrics by Edward Heyman) – Sung and danced by Sono Osato
- "Siesta" (music by Nacio Herb Brown; lyrics by Edward Heyman) – Sung by Frank Sinatra
- "Dance of Fury" (music by Nacio Herb Brown) – Danced by Ricardo Montalban, Cyd Charisse and Ann Miller
- "Señorita" (music by Nacio Herb Brown; lyrics by Earl K. Brent) – Sung by Frank Sinatra and Kathryn Grayson
- "Love Is Where You Find It" (music by Nacio Herb Brown; lyrics by Earl K. Brent) – Sung by Kathryn Grayson

== Reception ==
The film was a financial disaster, earning $969,000 in the US and Canada and $412,000 overseas, resulting in a loss to MGM of $2,643,000. This made it one of the least successful musicals in MGM history.

It was reviewed unfavorably in Picturegoer: "The progress of [the] romance is uninspired and very dull. The one worthwhile performance comes from J. Carrol Naish as The Kissing Bandit's henchman."

On an episode of the radio show, Light Up Time, Sinatra referred to himself as "star of The Kissing Bandit, the script of which somebody should have put a match to."

== Australian armed robbery ==
On December 10, 1950, a 19-year-old Estonian Australian immigrant named Peeter Pedaja hijacked a motorcycle while brandishing a toy gun somewhere on the road near Gympie, Queensland. Heading farther south, he forced a car to stop between Landsborough and Nambour, and demanded money from the driver before speeding off, eventually being arrested by Queensland police. He told the court that he meant no harm, and was inspired to "do something unusual" after watching The Kissing Bandit. Pedaja was released on a suspended sentence, and was eventually proclaimed "The Kissing Bandit in Real Life" by the Australian media.
