= David Henrie =

American actor (born 1989)

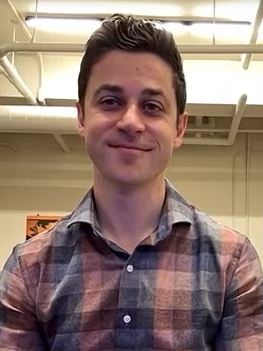
- Henrie in 2023
- Born: David Clayton Henrie; July 11, 1989 (age 37); Mission Viejo, California, U.S.
- Occupations: Actor; director; screenwriter
- Years active: 2002–present
- Known for: Wizards of Waverly Place; How I Met Your Mother; Wizards Beyond Waverly Place
- Spouse: Maria Cahill (m. 2017)
- Children: 5
- Relatives: Lorenzo James Henrie (brother)

David Clayton Henrie (/ˈhɛnri/ HEN-ree; born July 11, 1989) is an American actor, writer, and director. He is noted for playing Ted Mosby's future son Luke on How I Met Your Mother, Larry on That's So Raven and his breakthrough role Justin Russo in Wizards of Waverly Place and its sequel Wizards Beyond Waverly Place, as well as starring in the films Little Boy, Walt Before Mickey and Reagan.

== Early life ==
Henrie was born in Mission Viejo, California, to Linda Henrie (née Finocchiaro), a talent manager, and James Wilson Henrie, a producer formerly in real estate. He is the older brother of actor Lorenzo James Henrie. His maternal grandparents are Italian. Henrie was raised Catholic and grew up in Phoenix, Arizona.

== Career ==
At age 13, Henrie landed a regular role as Petey Pitt on the Fox sitcom The Pitts. Henrie next landed a leading role in the Hallmark movie, Monster Makers, with Linda Blair and George Kennedy, and was asked to come back for another Hallmark movie, to play a role in Dead Hollywood Moms Society. He also starred as Skylar Blaford in the Fox's sitcom Method & Red.

Henrie guest starred in many shows such as Providence, Without a Trace, The Mullets, Judging Amy, The D.A., Jack & Bobby, NCIS, House, and Cold Case. Before his role on Wizards of Waverly Place, he had a recurring role on That's So Raven as Cory's friend Larry. Henrie also had a recurring role on How I Met Your Mother, where he played Ted's future son.

At the age of 18, Henrie got the role of Justin Russo in the Disney Channel Original Series, Wizards of Waverly Place. The show premiered on October 12, 2007. He was in the movie Wizards of Waverly Place: The Movie with the cast of the series. Henrie played Justin Vincenzo Pepé Russo through the whole series. About a year after the finale, a film, The Wizards Return: Alex vs. Alex premiered on March 15, 2013, without Henrie, but his character was mentioned, and a photo of him is shown. Henrie is credited with writing two episodes of Wizards of Waverly Place, "Alex's Logo" and the series special "Meet the Werewolves".

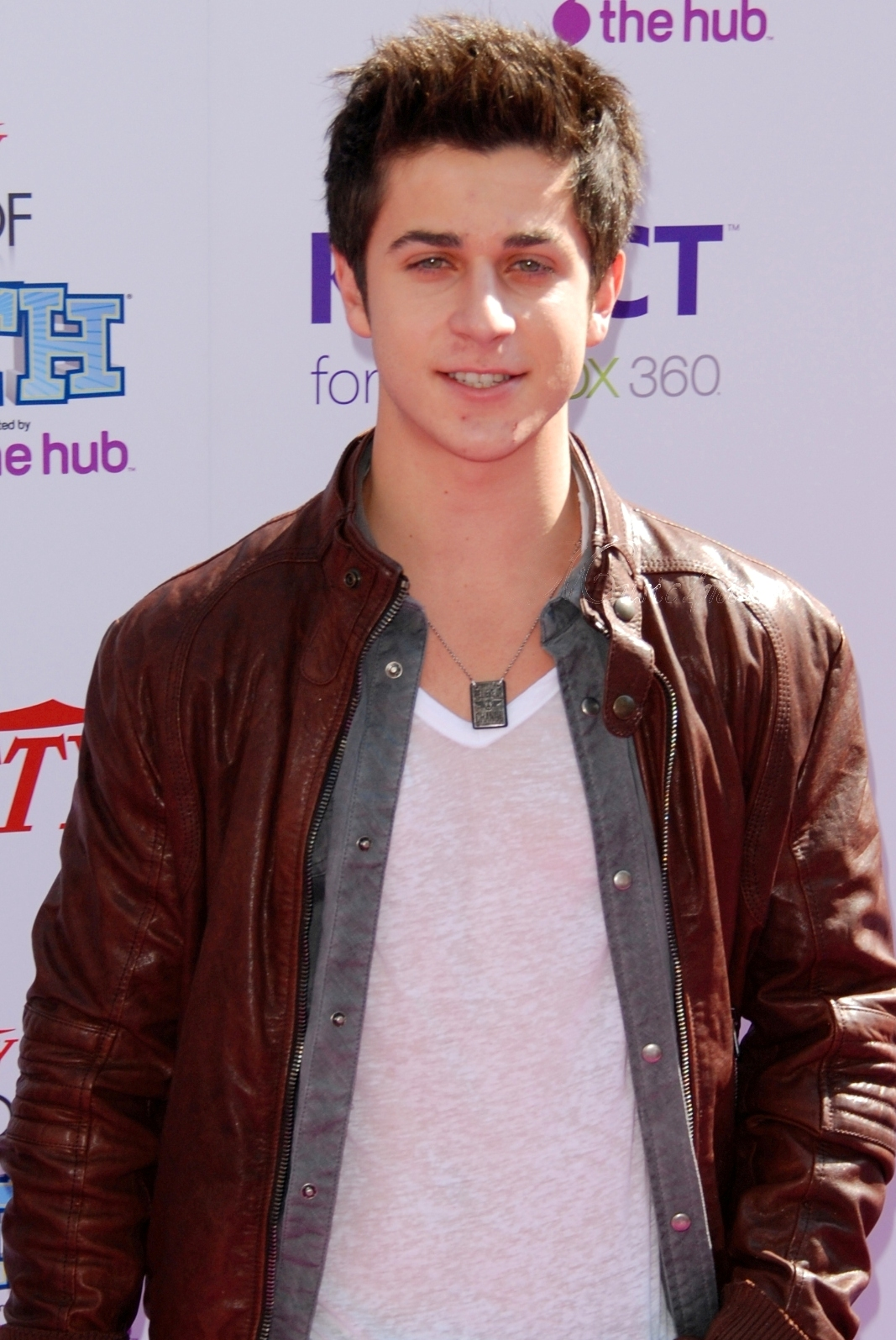
Henrie in 2010

He had a role in the Disney Channel Original Movie Dadnapped co-starring Emily Osment. Henrie made a guest appearance as himself in two episodes of Jonas. According to Reuters, Henrie was officially named the Grand Marshal for the 2009 Toyota Pro/Celebrity Race.

In 2010, Henrie guest-starred in the web series Easy to Assemble. In 2012, Henrie voiced the character of Shawn in the movie The Secret World of Arrietty.

Henrie appeared in Grown Ups 2 (2013), opposite Taylor Lautner and Adam Sandler. In 2014, Henrie played the lead in 1000 to 1: The Cory Weissman Story, the true story of a young basketball player who suffered a catastrophic stroke as a freshman at Gettysburg College. Later that year, Henrie guest starred in the ABC show Mind Games.

As of 2014, Henrie has directed two short films, Boo! and Catch.

In 2015, Henrie played the role of Lane, a valet who falls for Paul Blart's daughter, in the sequel Paul Blart: Mall Cop 2. He also co-starred as London Busbee, older brother of the title character, in the drama Little Boy, and had a role in the indie biographical drama film Walt Before Mickey in which he plays Rudy Ising, who worked for Walt Disney. Henrie had cameo appearances in indie drama Cardboard Boxer and Warrior Road.

In 2018, Henrie directed a coming-of-age film This Is the Year, in which he also starred and co-wrote. In August 2020, Henrie and his Wizards of Waverly Place co-star Selena Gomez, who served as executive producer on the film, announced the virtual movie premiere of This Is the Year. In 2023, Henrie played the role of Ted in the Tubi original series Underdeveloped.

In 2026, Henrie is the host of the EWTN original series Seeking Beauty. The first six episodes aired between January-February 2026, with six more episodes airing later in the year.

== Personal life ==
In October 2016, Henrie became engaged to former Miss Delaware 2011, Maria Cahill. They were married on April 21, 2017. They have five children: a girl born in March 2019, a boy born in December 2020, a girl born in July 2022, a girl stillborn in November 2023, and a boy born in September 2026. He is a practicing Catholic. He appears on the American Catholic meditation and prayer app Hallow.

On September 10, 2018, Henrie was arrested and charged at Los Angeles International Airport under allegations of carrying a loaded gun in the airport. He later released a statement on Twitter apologizing for the incident, stating that the act was unintentional and the gun was legally purchased. On September 26, 2018, it was reported Henrie was charged on three counts for "carrying a loaded firearm, carrying a concealed firearm, and possessing a weapon in a sterile area of the airport". He pled no contest to one charge and received two years probation.

== Filmography ==
=== Film ===
Year	Title	Role	Notes
2003	Monster Makers	Danny Burke	
2004	Hollywood Mom's Mystery	Oliver Palumbo	
2004	Arizona Summer	Bad	
2012	The Secret World of Arrietty	Shawn	Voice role, U.S. English dub
2013	Grown Ups 2	Frat Boy Zac	
2014	1000 to 1: The Cory Weissman Story	Cory Weissman	
2015	Paul Blart: Mall Cop 2	Lane	
2015	Little Boy	London Busbee	
2015	Walt Before Mickey	Rudy Ising	
2016	Cardboard Boxer	Clean Cut Man	
2016	Warrior Road	Tom	
2020	This Is the Year	Sebastian	Also writer and director
2023	Max & Me	D.J. (voice)	
2024	Reagan	Young Ronald Reagan	Shared with Dennis Quaid
2025	Goldbeak	Goldbeak	Voice role, U.S. English dub, Direct-to-video film

=== Television ===
Year	Title	Role	Notes
2002	Providence	Mark Triedman	Episode: "Gotcha"
2002	Without a Trace	Gabe Freedman	Episode: "Birthday Boy"
2003	The Pitts	Petey Pitt	Main role
2003	The Mullets	N/A	Episode: "Grudge Match"
2003	Judging Amy	Jeremy	Episode: "Sex and the Single Mother"
2004	The D.A.	Alex Henry	Episode: "The People vs. Patricia Henry"
2004	Method & Red	Skyler Blaford	Recurring role
2004	Jack and Bobby	Sniffly	Episode: "The Kindness of Strangers"
2004	NCIS	Willy Shields	Episode: "Terminal Leave"
2004–2007	That's So Raven	Larry	Recurring role; 12 episodes
2005	House M.D.	Tommy	Episode: "Cursed"
2005–2014	How I Met Your Mother	Luke Mosby	Recurring role (stock footage used since season 2); 65 episodes
2006	Cold Case	Dale Wilson (1975)	Episode: "Fireflies"
2007–2012	Wizards of Waverly Place	Justin Russo	Main role; 106 episodes; Writer: "Alex's Logo" & "Meet the Werewolves"
2008	Studio DC: Almost Live	Himself	Episode: "The Second Show"
2008	Disney Channel Games	Himself	Cyclone's Team Captain; Green Team
2009	The Suite Life on Deck	Justin Russo	Episode: "Double Crossed"
2009	Disney Channel's 3-Minute Game Show	Himself	Episodes: "The Cheetah Girls: One World", "Wizards of Waverly Place: The Movie"
2009	Dadnapped	Wheeze	Television film
2009	Wizards of Waverly Place: The Movie	Justin Russo	Television film
2010	Jonas	Himself	Episodes: "Boat Trip", "On the Radio"
2010	Easy to Assemble	Ethan	Episode: "Flying Solo"
2011	Disney's Friends for Change Games	Himself	Green Team
2013	Arrested Development	Himself/David Henrie	Episode: "It Gets Better"
2014	Mind Games	Elliot	Episode: "Embodied Cognition"
2021	A Tale Dark & Grimm	Handsome Young Man	2 episodes; also executive producer
2023	Underdeveloped	Ted	Tubi Original Series
2024–2026	Wizards Beyond Waverly Place	Justin Russo	Main role, 35 episodes; also executive producer, and director (episode "It's Beginning to Look a Lot Like Wizmas")
2026	Seeking Beauty	Himself	6 episodes

=== Director ===
Year	Title	Notes
2014	Catch	Short film, also writer and producer
2020	This Is the Year	Debut feature film
2024	Monster Summer	Also executive producer
2025	Wizards Beyond Waverly Place	Episode: "It's Beginning to Look a Lot Like Wizmas"

== Awards and nominations ==
Year	Award	Category	Work	Result	Refs
2003	Young Artist Awards	Best Performance in a TV Drama Series – Guest Starring Young Actor	Without a Trace	Nominated	
2004	Young Artist Awards	Best Performance in a Feature Film – Leading Young Actor	Arizona Summer	Nominated	
2004	Young Artist Awards	Best Performance in a TV Series (Comedy or Drama) - Leading Young Actor	The Pitts	Nominated	
2008	Young Artist Awards	Best Young Ensemble Performance in a TV Series	Wizards of Waverly Place	Nominated	
2011	Kids' Choice Awards	Favorite TV Sidekick	Wizards of Waverly Place	Nominated	
2013	Behind the Voice Actors Awards	Best Vocal Ensemble in an Anime Feature Film/Special	The Secret World of Arrietty	Nominated	
2014	Cleveland International Film Festival	Best Live Action Short Film	Catch	Nominated	
2022	Children's and Family Emmy Awards	Outstanding Animated Series (as producer)	A Tale Dark & Grimm	Nominated	
2025	Kids' Choice Awards	Favorite Male TV Star (Kids)	Wizards Beyond Waverly Place	Nominated	
