= Tim Batt =

New Zealand comedian

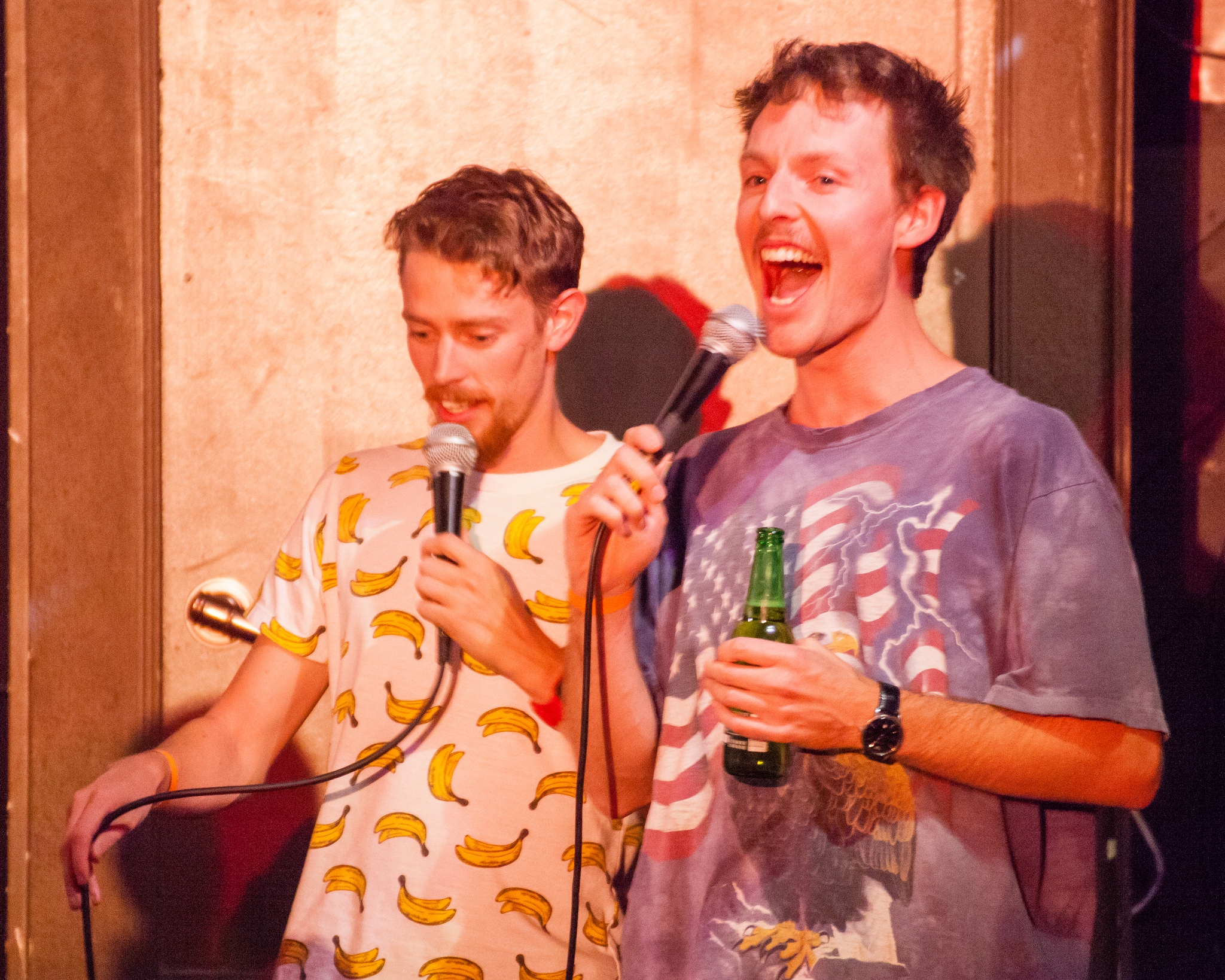
- Batt (left) in 2016
- Born: 19 August 1987 (age 38); Christchurch, New Zealand
- Known for: Comedy and podcasting
- Notable work: The Worst Idea of All Time
- Television: TVNZ Duke Banter
- Website: timbatt.co.nz

Tim Batt (born 19 August 1987) is a New Zealand-based comedian and podcaster. He co-hosted The Worst Idea of All Time podcast with fellow NZ comedian Guy Montgomery and was nominated for a Billy T Award in 2014 and 2015.

== Early life ==
Batt grew up in Christchurch, New Zealand and later spent time in Wellington, and then Auckland. Before comedy, he worked in radio and call centers. Batt attended Cobham Intermediate School, and was a contemporary of acclaimed singer and UNICEF ambassador Hayley Westenra, the two appearing together in school productions.

== Career ==
Batt's first appearance on TV was in 2014, on the TVNZ U show U LATE with future collaborator Guy Montgomery, where he appeared as a "pathetic but upbeat" public bathroom reviewer. He has also performed standup comedy and worked in commercial broadcasting on the networks MediaWorks and NZME.

After the channel shut down, the two decided to start a small project together, which turned into the podcast The Worst Idea of All Time, a podcast where every season the duo rewatch and review the same film weekly for a year. As of 2024, the show is New Zealand's most successful comedy podcast at over 18 million downloads. Based on the success of the podcast, Batt launched a podcast network, Little Empire Network. The network features podcasts by fellow comedians such as Rose Matafeo and Nic Sampson.

Batt hosted TVNZ Duke chat show Banter in 2017. In the same year, Montgomery and Batt were tapped to film a pilot for a TV show for YouTube Red. The pilot involved the two attempting to take a method approach to film reviewing by watching Teenage Mutant Ninja Turtles: Out of the Shadows while living in an abandoned subway station in New York City and eating nothing but pizza. The show was not greenlit for a series. In 2019, he hosted a chat/sketch show hybrid with cohost Luke Rowell called Space Couch.

Starting in 2022, Tim Batt cohosted a comedy/conspiracy theory podcast for Radio New Zealand with R.M.S. Titanic enthusiast Carlo Richie about Titanic conspiracy theories, specifically the Olympic exchange theory, called Did Titanic Sink?. In February 2022, Batt was appointed Creator Network Development Director for New Zealand for Swedish podcasting company Acast. In 2024, Did Titanic Sink? published a second season featuring a metanarrative involving the search for the mythical Canterbury Panther.
