= List of Baby Daddy episodes =

Baby Daddy is an American sitcom that premiered on Freeform (then known as ABC Family) on June 20, 2012. The sitcom stars Jean-Luc Bilodeau as Ben Wheeler, a bartender, who while moving his brother Danny Wheeler (Derek Theler) into the apartment Ben shares with best friend Tucker Dobbs (Tahj Mowry), he's surprised when Emma, a baby girl, is left on his doorstep by Angela, a girl with whom he had a one-night stand. He gets help from his mother Bonnie Wheeler (Melissa Peterman) and his close female friend Riley Perrin (Chelsea Kane) who also is in love with him.

During the course of the series, 100 episodes of Baby Daddy aired over six seasons.

== Series overview ==
Season	Episodes	Originally released	
Season	Episodes	First released	Last released
1	10	June 20, 2012	August 29, 2012
2	16	May 29, 2013	December 11, 2013
3	21	January 15, 2014	June 18, 2014
4	22	October 22, 2014	August 5, 2015
5	20	February 3, 2016	August 3, 2016
6	11	March 13, 2017	May 22, 2017

== Episodes ==
=== Season 1 (2012) ===
No. overall	No. in season	Title	Directed by	Written by	Original release date	Prod. code	U.S. viewers (millions)
1	1	"Pilot"	Michael Lembeck	Dan Berendsen	June 20, 2012	1001	1.65
Ben Wheeler (Jean-Luc Bilodeau), a flair bartender in his 20s becomes surprised when Emma, a three-month-old baby girl, is left on his apartment doorstep by Angela, his ex-girlfriend. He takes care of Emma, with help from his mother Bonnie (Melissa Peterman), his roommate Tucker (Tahj Mowry), his best friend Riley (Chelsea Kane), and his brother Danny (Derek Theler). When Angela returns, she leaves Ben adoption papers for Emma, which she has already signed and hopes that Ben will do the same. This means Emma would be put up for adoption, but Ben decides to keep Emma and raise her when he realizes he loves her.
2	2	"I Told You So"	Michael Lembeck	Dan Berendsen	June 27, 2012	1002	1.72
Bonnie is worried that the guys can't handle taking care of Emma. Ben, wanting to avoid his mother's "I told you so" and prove he can handle taking care of Emma, acts as though he has everything under control. However, in a series of mishaps, Emma ends up accidentally being left alone in the guys' apartment. Ben, feeling his first parental gut-wrenching scare that he could have lost his child, with help from Bonnie, he realizes he needs to get his act together to really become a good parent to Emma.
3	3	"The Nurse and the Curse"	Michael Lembeck	Heidi Clements	July 11, 2012	1003	1.44
Ben and Tucker take Emma to her first doctor's appointment, and Ben ends up asking her nurse, Cassie (Briana Lane), out on a date, and she accepts. Riley is jealous of Ben's new relationship with Cassie, but tries to befriend her respecting Ben's request. Meanwhile, Danny has his first hockey game with the New York Rangers and he's very superstitious - he wears an old high school jersey that has never been washed to every game and Bonnie caters to his every ritual because she wants Danny to win his first game. While doing laundry, Tucker accidentally washes Danny's lucky jersey and it shrinks down to a tattered mess which devastates Danny. At the game, Cassie tells Riley she knows she likes Ben and directly insults her, saying Ben will only ever see her as "Fat Pants". This causes Riley to fight with her, which is featured on the jumbotron. Ben breaks up with Cassie, because she thinks that Riley likes him, which Riley denies. With Danny's old jersey shrunken, Tucker puts it on Emma and Danny calls her his new good luck charm.
4	4	"Guys, Interrupted"	Michael Lembeck	Nancy Cohen	July 18, 2012	1004	1.10
The guys appreciate all of Bonnie's help, but she becomes a little too overwhelming for them. Ben looks forward to his time with Emma when he's not working, but with Bonnie always jumping in to take care of her, he's starting to miss the time he is supposed to have with Emma. Meanwhile, Riley has a new study partner, Jack (David Cade), who Danny seems jealous of, but Ben encourages her to date him. The guys try to hide from Bonnie by heading over to Riley's apartment, which ends up sabotaging her date with Jack. After Bonnie finds out that the boys don't want her around, she makes Ben tell her how she really feels, which upsets her. However, Ben tells her that she is still important and her help is still needed, but she just needs to give the boys some space. Bonnie agrees to this, and they reconcile.
5	5	"Married to the Job"	Michael Lembeck	Lester Lewis	July 25, 2012	1005	1.39
A baby shower is thrown at the boys' apartment for Emma and Bonnie gets her a girly stroller, which the guys quickly return in exchange for a much cooler stroller that attracts women. Ben finds out that there is a new position opening up at the bar as a manager, but his boss doesn't think that he is responsible enough for the position. When he sees Riley with Emma, he reconsiders, since he now thinks that Ben is a family man. Riley goes along with it and all goes well until Ben meets his boss' daughter at the meeting, who is the same girl from whom had previously gotten a number from before. Meanwhile, Danny and Tucker compete to see who can get the most phone numbers from random girls on the street with the help of the stroller, as Bonnie chases them around, looking to get the girly stroller back. Danny finally admits to Riley that he loves her, but she takes it as an act to get her out of the situation with Ben, so she goes along with it and thanks him. On her way to return the stroller that the boys bought, Bonnie grabs the attention of a man on the street and begins using it like the boys did.
6	6	"Take Her Out of the Ballgame"	Arlene Sanford	Mark Amato	August 1, 2012	1006	1.10
Riley is voted into Ben's position as team captain of his and Tucker's softball team. Tucker is tired of losing and when Riley jumps in to help them, he is excited until her competitive spirit comes out and pushes the team to the limit. Bonnie brings boxes filled with Ben and Danny's childhood accomplishments into the boys' apartment. Meanwhile, Bonnie begins dating Danny's hockey coach, Hank (Tuc Watkins), which upsets Danny. Riley's new position as the softball team's new captain upsets Ben. After Riley pushes the team too hard, they vote Ben captain again, but he has to be the one who fires Riley. Once Danny finally accepts Hank dating Bonnie, Hank says that Bonnie isn't his type and doesn't want to date her, Danny gets upset and tells him that he would be lucky to have his mom. Riley and Ben become co-captains and the team celebrates a winning streak. Danny, now ready for Bonnie to begin dating, tries to set her up with any man he can find.
7	7	"May the Best Friend Win"	Michael Lembeck	Kirill Baru & Eric Zimmerman	August 8, 2012	1007	1.12
Ben and Tucker put their friendship aside when they compete for the heart of Ava (Ashley Argota), a beautiful, young woman they both met at a concert. Danny tries to keep them together, telling them that going against each other for a girl will ruin their friendship. Bonnie creates an online dating profile. Danny is asked to give a speech at a press conference in front of his team, but is nervous, so Riley offers to help him. Danny reveals to Bonnie that he has feelings for Riley. Ben and Tucker retaliate against each other to try to keep each other away from Ava. Both end up on the same date with Ava at the club, so they have a dance battle which weirds Ava out. She ends up leaving, but before she can Ben and Tucker confront her making her choose between them, and Ava chooses Tucker. At Danny's press conference, Ben shows up mad at Tucker saying that he didn't invite him to the conference like Danny asked, which made Danny mad. While lecturing Ben about how he and Tucker shouldn't be fighting because they're like teammates, he gives an accidental speech, which everyone there loves. While celebrating his great speech, Danny accidentally kisses Riley, turning the situation awkward. Ben goes back to the apartment and apologizes to Tucker for being a bad friend, and Tucker forgives him saying that he didn't want Ava anymore because she was too talkative & annoying so they then come up with a plan to change her feelings towards Tucker, thus they set Danny and Ava up.
8	8	"The Daddy Whisper"	Michael Lembeck	Heidi Clements	August 15, 2012	1008	1.32
Ben signs him and Emma up for their first Mommy and Me class. Tucker and Danny plan to watch a huge wrestling event with Ben in the apartment, until Ben brings Izzy (Amber Stevens), a mom who knows a lot about babies and is referred to as "The Mommy Whisperer", to discuss ways to baby proof the apartment. Leaving Tucker and Danny needing to find a place to watch the match. Riley gets a job as an intern at a law firm. Bonnie takes Emma and Riley shopping for clothes for Riley to wear at her firm, and they end up getting arrested when Emma accidentally takes a gold watch out of a store. Tucker and Danny watch the wrestling match in an old laundry room in their building and call it their "man cave". Ben checks on the match down in the laundry room and accidentally locks him, along with Tucker and Danny, in the laundry room leaving Izzy in the apartment alone. Bonnie and Riley find Izzy in the apartment and tell her that not everything needs to be perfect when it comes to raising a child, making Izzy admit that having a baby is tiring and hard. They eventually hear the boys yelling through the air vents for help and go down to save them. Then, Izzy, Ben, Danny, Riley watch the remainder of the match leaving Tucker stuck in the air vents.
9	9	"A Wheeler Christmas Outing"	Michael Lembeck	Lester Lewis	August 22, 2012	1009	1.25
It's the hottest day of the year, and Bonnie and Ben announce the annual Christmas family photo, and since they are like family, Tucker and Riley will be taking the picture along with them. Ben then surprises Bonnie that his and Danny's father, Ray (Greg Grunberg), will be coming into town for the photo, much to Bonnie's dismay. Tucker and Riley are assigned to go to a storage locker and bring back boxes full of old Christmas costumes. On the drive back, Tucker finds a box with Danny's old high school journal in it. He and Riley read it and find that Danny was in love with a girl in high school, with her name coded "Girl X". Tucker immediately knows that this girl is Riley and leaves her to figure out who the girl is. Ray arrives in town and Ben tries to get him and Bonnie back together. Later, out on the fire escape, Ray and Bonnie form a sort of connection. Ray then goes to Ben's job at the bar and reveals to him that he's gay and that he's seeing and living with a guy named Steve. Ben tells him that he cannot tell anyone till after the family photo so everyone can be happy. Then Danny arrives and both Ben and Ray tell him that there is someone who wants to come out as gay, and that they should keep it between them. Based on how they told him, Danny assumes it's Ben. Tucker tells Danny that he and Riley read his journal, but that she has no idea who "Girl X" is. Bonnie hits on Ray, thinking they're going to get back together, but Ben interrupts and stops Bonnie from doing anything else. At the family photography center, Everyone dresses in their costumes. Riley confronts Danny and demands to know who "Girl X" is, but Danny refuses to say anything. Right before the picture is taken, Danny blurts out that Ben is gay which surprises everyone, but Ray stops this and admits that he is gay, which makes Bonnie happy because it confirms that the reason the divorce was not her fault.
10	10	"Something Borrowed, Something Ben"	Michael Lembeck	Dan Berendsen & Nancy Cohen	August 29, 2012	1010	1.40
Riley is chosen as a maid of honor and is planning a wedding for her friend, Katie (Melissa Tang), who is marrying her childhood sweetheart, Dave, and gets everybody involved. Ben invites a high school friend, Gene (Trent Garrett), a jerk who used to play pranks on Riley, Danny, and Bonnie. Bonnie is asked to make a tribute video for the wedding and Danny and Tucker are put in charge of the wedding cake, which they accidentally drop and ruin and try to fix it but are unsuccessful. After partying the night before the wedding, Ben and Katie wake up to find themselves in bed together. In her hotel room, Katie feels guilty and thinks about calling off the wedding and blames Ben for what happened. Riley shows up and makes her nervous, causing her to call off the wedding. Feeling guilty, Ben gives her a speech about true love and finding that special someone and encourages her to put the wedding back on. No longer feeling nervous, Katie puts the wedding back on. Back at the boys' apartment, Bonnie tells the boys that the wedding could be called off. Gene says he knows why, revealing to Tucker, Danny, and Bonnie that he's up to something. Bonnie brings the boys and Gene to Katie's hotel room to reveal that Ben and Katie never actually slept together. Both were passed out in separate rooms, so Gene put them in the same bed as a prank. Katie and Ben no longer feel guilty, so everybody continues with their wedding duties and Riley shoves Gene into the cake Danny put back together. At the wedding, Riley finds Ben on the roof and Ben asks her to dance with him. During the dance, Ben develops feelings for Riley. While on the roof, Danny sees Ben and Riley dancing and becomes upset because of his feelings for her.

=== Season 2 (2013) ===
The second season premiered on May 29, 2013. Matt Dallas, who previously worked with Jean-Luc Bilodeau on the ABC Family series Kyle XY, appeared in a recurring role as Fitch Douglas, a love interest for Riley. Both Lacey Chabert and Grace Phipps also had recurring roles this season. Wayne Brady guest starred in the episode "There's Something Fitchy Going On".

No. overall	No. in season	Title	Directed by	Written by	Original release date	Prod. code	U.S. viewers (millions)
11	1	"I'm Not That Guy"	Michael Lembeck	Dan Berendsen	May 29, 2013	2001	0.86
Ben realizes his romantic feelings for Riley. Riley invites Ben to a work-related party where she has to bring a date and Ben gladly accepts. Because Danny still has feelings for Riley, he questions if she wants to go through with it. Tucker finds out that someone from the wedding named Susie Kettle posted a picture of Ben on a website that ridicules men that say they'll call a woman but don't, which upsets Riley. Bonnie tries to get the attention of Marcus (Anthony Montgomery), a fellow young single grandparent. Ben tries to use Susie to get him off the website and tries to stop his playboy ways to get Riley to forgive him. Danny starts a relationship with a Russian supermodel named Milena. Tucker begs Danny to set up a double date with Milena and one of her model friends. Riley asks Danny to be her date to the party at her firm. Ben asks Danny to cancel on Riley so he could be her only option for Riley to go with, which he agrees to. Once Danny cancels on Riley, she lets Ben go with her but he couldn't mess anything up for her. Bonnie meets up with Marcus for a date, where she quickly becomes bored with him because of his excessive talking and the fact that there is nothing interesting about him. Bonnie accidentally brings home the wrong baby from her date with Marcus. Because he is out looking for Emma, Ben leaves Riley alone at the firm's party. Ben tells Danny that Riley's all alone at her party, so Danny leaves Tucker on the double date with Milena and her friend. Danny finds Riley at her party where she has already met Dr. Fitch Douglas (Matt Dallas), a caring, charitable, and handsome young doctor who becomes her date, which upsets Danny. Then Ben arrives and also sees Riley with Fitch, which upsets him as well.
12	2	"There's Something Fitchy Going On"	Robbie Countryman	Heidi Clements	June 5, 2013	2002	0.80
Ben becomes upset because Riley begins dating Fitch, the man she met at a party that her law firm threw. Tucker gets a new job as an intern for a television station, which he thinks is the next step to being able to actually work in television. Ben doesn't trust Fitch and thinks he lying to Riley, while everyone else thinks Fitch is amazing. Ben discovers something that could mean that Fitch isn't who he says he is. When that turns out to be a fluke, he looks for something else to try to expose him. Tucker tries to impress his boss Chase Baxter (Wayne Brady), a self-centered television personality who has a knack for womanizing. Now with Milena, Danny tells Bonnie that he is over Riley and has moved on and that he is glad that he never told her because it would've ruined their friendship. He then discovers that he had accidentally butt-dialed Riley and recorded his and Bonnie's conversation over voicemail. Then when Bonnie tries to fix it, she accidentally sends the voicemail to Riley. Tucker tries to get Fitch to hire Chase to be a spokesperson for a charity event, because Tucker believes it could get himself a promotion. However, he turns him down because Chase is self-centered and doesn't care about charity. Ben discovers Riley and Fitch alone, and when Riley leaves, Fitch pulls out a wedding ring and puts it on his finger, which surprises Ben, but finally gives him something to expose. When he tries to tell Riley, she refuses to listen to him. Danny and Bonnie recover Riley's phone and attempt to delete the voicemail Bonnie sent. Before they can delete it, Riley realizes she is missing her phone, thinks that they found it, and takes her phone. Ben leaves Emma with Milena and crashes Riley's date with Fitch at a restaurant. Then Danny and Bonnie intreat the date trying to get Riley's phone. Then Tucker and Milena interrupt with Emma and Chase because Tucker is trying to get Fitch to consider Chase to be the spokesperson for his charity event. When Riley discovers that Bonnie keeps taking her phone, Bonnie drops a glass of water. Ben then calls the family, including and Tucker, to a meeting and reveals that Fitch is married. When Riley confronts him about it, he says he was married until his wife died because an elephant sat on her. He then says he wants to talk with Ben. Instead of fighting with him, he says that he is in love with her and thinks that Ben has feelings for Riley. And if Ben loves her, then he'll back off, much to Ben's surprise. At first, Ben doesn't know what to say because he doesn't how he feels about Riley. He tells Fitch that he loves her enough not to stand in her way of true love, and lets Fitch have her. Fitch fixes Riley's phone and she listens to Danny's voicemail, and she deletes it. Chase gets the job as Fitch's spokesperson and messes it up. It goes viral making Tucker realize he's never getting a promotion.
13	3	"The Wheeler and Dealer"	Michael Lembeck	Kirill Baru & Eric Zimmerman	June 12, 2013	2006	0.90
While at work, Ben finds Danny a possible endorsement deal with a Japanese energy drink, Okiru. With Fitch in Africa, Riley wants to give to back to community by volunteering as a candy striper at a local hospital. Ben introduces the endorsement deal to Danny and Bonnie. While Danny is excited, Bonnie doesn't agree that he should be endorsing a foreign drink. At the hospital, Riley realizes volunteering isn't all it's cracked up to be. Riley bumps into Tucker, who is pretending to be a doctor. After meeting with people representing Okiru, Bonnie still doesn't agree with the endorsement. Ben lies to Danny telling him that Bonnie said yes to the endorsement, and Danny signs the Okiru contract. After drinking many cans of Okiru, Danny shows to the commercial shoot hyper. Ben reads the can's label, and reads that you're not supposed to drink more than two within 24 hours. Bonnie finds out about the commercial shoot, she goes there and lets Ben lead, knowing something is gonna go wrong. While shooting the commercial, Danny slams into a wall, giving himself a concussion. Just as Riley and Tucker are about to quit their jobs at the hospital, Ben and Bonnie, along with production crew, arrive at the hospital with an unconscious Danny. Tucker and Riley get stuck with Danny in the hospital elevator. Tucker tries to find Danny's heartbeat with a fake stethoscope, but finds nothing moving him and Riley into panic. Riley tries to give Danny CPR to revive him, which works. Then Danny knocks Riley to the ground, knocking her unconscious. Once the elevator door opens, Danny walks out carrying Riley. At the boy's apartment, Danny tells Riley that he doesn't remember anything from the incident. Tucker is called to the hospital, since he stole a pager.
14	4	"New Bonnie vs. Old Ben"	Bob Koherr	Vince Cheung & Ben Montanio	June 12, 2013	2004	0.72
Bonnie moves into the apartment across the hall from Ben and Tucker's place; Ben and Tucker do all they can to get her to move out. Riley helps Danny break up with Milena.
15	5	"The Slump"	Michael Lembeck	Frank Pines	June 19, 2013	2005	1.02
Ben is stuck in the middle when his latest fling Jenna (Anna Maria Perez de Tagle), is also a rival of Tucker's for a coveted job promotion. Danny begins seeing psychologist Dr. Amy Shaw (Lacey Chabert), to discuss his under performance on the ice.
16	6	"Ben's Big Gaycare Adventure"	Michael Lembeck	Heidi Clements	June 26, 2013	2007	0.85
Ben pretends that he and Tucker are a gay couple to have Emma admitted quicker in a local daycare and tries to date Megan (Grace Phipps), the assistant manager of the daycare. Riley begins to express her jealous feelings of Danny and Amy's relationship. Bonnie begins going to beauty school.
17	7	"On The Lamb-y"	Michael Lembeck	Nancy Cohen	July 10, 2013	2003	0.71
Ben, Tucker and Danny try to get Lamby, Emma's stuffed animal that she cannot manage to sleep without, from their new neighbor Kayla (Kelly Stables) who takes it from the elevator when Ben drops it. Meanwhile, Riley is hosting book club to impress her colleagues at the law firm, but with Bonnie being her roommate while her house is being fumigated causes a rivalry with Riley's mom, Jennifer (Caroline Rhea) and creates many disagreements during book club.
18	8	"Never Ben in Love"	Michael Lembeck	Dan Berendsen	July 17, 2013	2008	1.02
Ben has a hard time wanting to get intimate with Megan, and he begins to think that he may be in love with her. Fitch dies (but is actually revealed to be alive when he makes an appearance at the eulogy) with Riley now conflicted if she was ever in love with him. When Danny found out that Fitch wanted to break up with Riley during a video that he made but when she found out she said that she want to break up with him. With Fitch's death, Tucker comes up with a bucket list, which a calls a "Tucket List". Bonnie tries to move in romantically with Fitch's dad, Winston (Diedrich Bader).
19	9	"All's Flair in Love and War"	Michael Lembeck	Kirill Baru & Eric Zimmerman	July 24, 2013	2009	0.83
Tucker rekindles the romance with his ex-girlfriend Vanessa (Meagan Tandy), which bothers Ben due to fact that they cannot get along. Vanessa is later hired as Ben's boss at the Bar on B. Danny plays matchmaker for Riley to be set up with Gerard (Antonio Sabàto, Jr.), the goalie on his team. Gerard mistakenly thinks his date is with Bonnie.
20	10	"Test Anxiety"	Michael Lembeck	Nancy Cohen	July 31, 2013	2010	1.02
A pregnancy test is found in the apartment bathroom causing a misunderstanding with everyone. Riley fails her Bar exam for the third time. Amy's father (Andy Buckley) doesn't want Danny to date Amy anymore.
21	11	"Whatever Lola Wants"	Michael Lembeck	Frank Pines	August 7, 2013	2011	0.87
Ben is left in charge of watching Megan's dog Lola, but the dog is not fond of Ben. Lola is then stolen by a cleaning crew that Danny hired to clean the apartment. Riley attempts to be re-hired by her previous law firm and tries to convince her old boss, Mrs. Jensen (Kym Whitley) that she is tough enough to be a lawyer, by suing Bonnie for a botched tan job.
22	12	"The Christening"	Michael Lembeck	Heidi Clements	August 14, 2013	2012	0.74
The Wheelers pretend to be a happy normal family when their Aunt Betty (Mary Pat Gleason) comes to town for Emma's christening. This also happens at a bad time when Ray's ex-boyfriend Steve (Robert Gant), also comes to town to win Ray back. Riley, who was named Emma's godmother, must mediate between Danny and Tucker on who should be Emma's godfather.
23	13	"All Riled Up"	Michael Lembeck	Kirill Baru & Eric Zimmerman	August 21, 2013	2013	0.92
Ben feels it is finally time to express his romantic feelings for Riley, so he takes her on a "pretend date". However, the "pretend date" leads to an actual date with Ben giving mixed messages about wanting to set up Riley with the perfect guy, when he really meant himself. Ben then sets Riley up with Kevin (Aaron Hill), the beer delivery guy who frequents the Bar on B, with Ben giving Kevin false information on what to say on their date. Meanwhile, Bonnie and Tucker audition together as the mascots for the New York Rangers, much to Danny's chagrin.
24	14	"The Emma Dilemma"	Michael Lembeck	Brian Fernandes	August 28, 2013	2014	1.35
Ben tries to get Emma included in the playgroup hosted by his upstairs neighbor Kayla, who still has a grudge against him. Riley helps Danny understand the language of "girl" to patch things up with Amy.
25	15	"Surprise!"	Michael Lembeck	Dan Berendsen	September 4, 2013	2015	1.27
Ben decides to throw Riley a birthday party to try to make amends after ruining her sixteenth birthday party. Danny finally reveals to Ben that Riley has been in love with him since they were kids. Upon hearing this, he decides to set up a romantic date before taking her back to his apartment for her surprise party. Things go awry when he loses her on the subway. Meanwhile, Bonnie and Tucker get in contact with Angela (Mimi Gianopulos), Emma's mother, after realizing that Bonnie never sent in the paperwork granting Ben sole custody of Emma. Riley finds her way back to Ben's apartment and says she realized Ben ditched her when she was in the Bronx and that it was the worst birthday ever. After Danny hears that Ben lost Riley on the subway, he berates him by saying that he knew that he would hurt her feelings if he told him that she's in love with him. Amy overhears this and tearfully breaks up with Danny. Ben returns inside and explains to Riley that he lost her and what his plans were and she tries to leave but he stops and kisses Riley, who kisses him back. Angela is then standing in Ben's doorway and states that after seeing a picture of a smiling Emma, she decided that she misses her and wants her back. After Riley's party, Tucker asks Danny if he's okay with Ben dating Riley and he says yes, while also revealing that he got a tattoo of Amy's name on his wrist before she broke up with him, and a wrist tattoo of Riley's name, on the other.
26	16	"Emma's First Christmas"	Michael Lembeck	Ben Montanio & Vince Cheung	December 11, 2013	2016	1.11
Ben and Danny shop at the last minute to buy Emma the perfect toy, which leads to them making a deal with Edwin (Leslie Jordan), a shady mall elf. Riley and Tucker are appointed as Bonnie's "little helpers", to help pull off the perfect Christmas for the apartment.

=== Season 3 (2014) ===
The third season premiered on January 15, 2014. Bruce Thomas, who previously worked with Jean-Luc Bilodeau on Kyle XY, guest starred in the episode "The Bet". Bilodeau's other Kyle XY co-star Matt Dallas reprised his role as Fitch in the episode "Lights! Camera! No Action!". Mary Hart also guest starred as herself in that episode. Other guest stars this season included Lucy Hale, David DeLuise, Phil Morris, Mark DeCarlo, Kelsey Chow and Dot-Marie Jones.

No. overall	No. in season	Title	Directed by	Written by	Original release date	Prod. code	U.S. viewers (millions)
27	1	"The Naked Truth"	Michael Lembeck	Dan Berendsen	January 15, 2014	3001	1.10
Now that they are officially a couple, Ben and Riley are thinking about taking their relationship to the sexual level. Emma's mother, Angela tries to be more involved in her daughter's life, despite frequent ridicule from Bonnie. Tucker helps Danny get back into the dating scene, after Amy breaks up with him.
28	2	"The Lying Game"	Michael Lembeck	Heidi Clements	January 22, 2014	3002	1.10
Angela continues to romantically pursue Ben, despite the fact that he is in a relationship with Riley. Still jealous of Ben and Riley's relationship, Danny decides it is time to get his own apartment. Bonnie lies about her age, as she is dating a younger guy named Brad (Peter Porte).
29	3	"Lights! Camera! No Action!"	Michael Lembeck	Frank Pines	January 29, 2014	3003	1.29
Now that Ben and Riley have broken up, they both decide to rebound with their exes. Riley gets back with Fitch, and Ben gives into feelings for Angela. To get a promotion to television producer, Tucker books Danny on Mary Hart's talk show.
30	4	"Bonnie's Unreal Estate"	Michael Lembeck	Vince Cheung & Ben Montanio	February 5, 2014	3004	1.03
Riley is left in charge of watching Piper Stockdale (Lucy Hale), a minister's daughter, whose father is being investigated for money laundering. However, Piper turns out to be a handful to every one around her, unbeknownst to Riley, who believes to be Piper's sweet innocent act. After burning down an apartment that Bonnie was going to sell for her new real estate job, Ben tries to make things right with Bonnie's boss Carol Beltran (Maria Canals-Barrera). Danny and Tucker make a bet to swear off women.
31	5	"Life's a Beach"	Michael Lembeck	Kirill Baru & Eric Zimmerman	February 12, 2014	3005	0.98
Tired of Sondra (Rachna Khatau), their overbearing board president, Ben, Danny and Tucker campaign to have her removed from the position, after she shuts down their rooftop beach. Bonnie and Riley go on a double date with Brad and his twin brother Tad, but the women suspect that Tad doesn't really exist and that Brad is covering for the fact that he flirted with Riley, so Bonnie doesn't break up with him.
32	6	"Romancing the Phone"	Michael Lembeck	Janae Bakken	February 26, 2014	3006	0.84
Ben finds the cell phone of an attractive woman named Sydney (Aimee Carrero), who he believes is his new soul-mate. However, the relationship sours, when Ben is late to meet her to give back her cell phone, so Ben asks Tucker to pretend to be him, so he can swoop in salvage his relationship with her. Riley meets up with Heather (Cassie Scerbo), her competitive friend from summer camp, she then has Danny get involved to prove how successful her life is now. Bonnie's new real estate ads send the wrong messages to her customers.
33	7	"The Bet"	Michael Lembeck	Heidi Clements	March 5, 2014	3007	0.86
Ben makes a bet with Riley that he will be able to get a date with Riley's friend Heather, even though Ben and Heather only had a one-night stand, and Heather has already forgotten about him. Bonnie wants to break up with Brad, but changes her mind after he ends up in the hospital and confesses his love for her. Bonnie also falls for Brad's father Jim (Bruce Thomas). Tucker tries to use Emma to pick up women.
34	8	"A Knight to Remember"	Michael Lembeck	Vince Cheung & Ben Montanio	March 12, 2014	3008	0.79
Marshall Dobbs (Phil Morris), Tucker's dad visits, with Ben helping Tucker lie about him being a lawyer. Riley falls for a British stranger, a professor named Philip Farlow (Christopher O'Shea). Not knowing about Philip, a misunderstanding from Bonnie, has her thinking that Riley has fallen for Danny.
35	9	"Go Brit or Go Home"	Michael Lembeck	Janae Bakken	March 19, 2014	3009	0.73
Riley wants Ben to be friends with Philip. Ben then pretends to be Philip and flirts with one of his students and puts Philip's job in jeopardy when he is charged with sexual harassment. Danny's hockey playing is criticized by Logan (Courtney Parks), an attractive sports reporter, but that does not stop them from sleeping together, which bothers Bonnie. Tucker develops a fake British accent to pick up women.
36	10	"An Affair Not to Remember"	Michael Lembeck	Frank Pines	March 26, 2014	3010	0.90
Tucker begins dating Stephanie (Kelsey Chow), a woman who previously dated Ben, with Ben fearing that Stephanie is still holding a grudge against him, due to things ending badly between the two of them. Mrs. Jensen invites Riley to a spa day with the other women at the law office, with Bonnie also being invited by Mrs. Jensen, as Riley's plus one, much to Riley's dislike.
37	11	"The Wingmom"	Michael Lembeck	Kirill Baru & Eric Zimmerman	April 2, 2014	3011	0.87
Ben has a hard time meeting women and agrees to have Bonnie be his "wingmom". However, Bailey (Bailey Buntain), the woman that Bonnie has set Ben up with, has a very similar personality to Bonnie's. Riley and Tucker accidentally wreck Danny's new car, that used to belong to Danny's dad.
38	12	"Send in the Clowns"	Michael Lembeck	Dan Berendsen & Heidi Clements	April 9, 2014	3012	0.92
Ben wants to throw Emma her 1st birthday party at the ice cream parlor where he used to work as a teenager, but he has been banned from the parlor since then for having sexual relations with the boss's daughter. Danny learns a dark secret about Riley's family involving her Aunt Margot (Amanda Detmer).
39	13	"Play It Again, Bonnie"	Michael Lembeck	Dan Berendsen & Heidi Clements	April 16, 2014	3013	0.88
Bonnie still has feelings for Brad and asks for Tucker's help to get him back. Brad has the same feelings for Bonnie, but is encouraged by Ben to date someone else, after Bonnie tells Ben, Tucker and Danny prior, that she is over Brad, before changing her mind. Danny helps Riley and Margot have a better mother-daughter relationship and is upset that Margot allowed Riley to let Philip move into Riley's place.
40	14	"Livin' on a Prom"	Michael Lembeck	Janae Bakken	April 23, 2014	3014	0.79
Ben tries to get Bonnie tickets to a Bon Jovi concert at Madison Square Garden. Danny and Riley attend a prom at their old high school as chaperones.
41	15	"From Here to Paternity"	Michael Lembeck	Frank Pines	April 30, 2014	3015	0.91
Now knowing that her Aunt Margot is her biological mother, Riley sets out to find her biological father, with help from Ben. Riley is then conflicted with the possibly of it being two different men, David Brinkerhoff (David DeLuise), a pastry chef and Mark Clements (Adam J. Harrington), a successful lawyer. Marshall Dobbs tells Tucker that he is divorcing his mother. Danny then encourages Bonnie to spend time with Marshall to loosen him up, which leads to embarrassing results. In the end, through a paternity test, it was revealed that David is Riley's father.
42	16	"Curious Georgie"	Michael Lembeck	Kirill Baru & Eric Zimmerman	May 7, 2014	3016	0.71
Philip's sister Georgie (Mallory Jansen) visits, with Riley being put off by her standoffish attitude. Danny and Bonnie are worried about contract re-negotiations, they then ask Tucker to date the new New York Rangers general manager Valerie (Gabrielle Dennis), so Danny can secure a spot on the team.
43	17	"Flirty Dancing"	Michael Lembeck	Joshua Malek	May 14, 2014	3017	0.75
Ben, Danny and Riley look at their old time capsules from elementary school, with Ben and Riley pursuing life goals to better themselves. Danny and Georgie begin to develop feelings for each other, even though Ben and Georgie are dating. Bonnie, Riley and Tucker join a dance class and then take part in a dance competition.
44	18	"Baby Steps"	Michael Lembeck	Frank Pines & Kirill Baru & Eric Zimmerman	May 28, 2014	3018	0.92
Danny, Tucker, Riley and Bonnie look back on their past ridiculous situations, while Ben is at work. Right after Ben leaves for work, Emma takes her first steps, walking to Danny. Danny, Tucker, Riley and Bonnie then scheme to have Emma take her "first steps" again, this time walking to Ben.
45	19	"Foos It or Lose It"	Michael Lembeck	Vince Cheung & Ben Montanio	June 4, 2014	3019	0.78
Bonnie baby-proofs the apartment and accidentally sells the foosball table that held Emma's college fund to a fraternity. Ben and Tucker apply as pledges to the fraternity to get the foosball table back. Meanwhile, Danny and Georgie's relationship continues to grow, much to Riley's dislike. Georgie then sets up an interview for Riley at her job at Vogue magazine, for the magazine's legal department. Riley overhears from Georgie that her interview was fake.
46	20	"All Aboard the Love Train"	Michael Lembeck	Heidi Clements	June 11, 2014	3020	0.69
Riley has to go to a family reunion in Florida, and takes a train instead of a plane due to her fear of dying in a plane crash. Ben agrees to accompany Riley on her train trip, and uses the opportunity to try to win her back, with a romantic evening, until Riley figures out Ben's plan. Tucker wants to be the new co-host for Mary Hart's talk show, and has Bonnie help him with an audition tape. Mary Hart is more impressed with Bonnie and has her take the co-hosting spot instead of Tucker. Danny is left to baby-sit Emma along with preparing dinner for his date with Georgie.
47	21	"You Can't Go Home Again"	Michael Lembeck	Dan Berendsen	June 18, 2014	3021	0.80
Ben and Riley reunite, with Ben wanting to tell everyone that they are back together, but Riley is still hesitant to announce the news, fearing that Ben will fall back into his old womanizing ways. Georgie tells Danny that she is moving to Paris for her job at Vogue, with Danny contemplating on moving there with her. Bonnie plans on winning at the annual block party at her old neighborhood that she started, by having Tucker sing at the party's karaoke contest.

=== Season 4 (2014–15) ===
The fourth season premiered on October 22, 2014, with the series' first Halloween episode "Strip or Treat". The second Christmas episode of the series entitled "It's a Wonderful Emma" premiered on December 10. Aisha Dee guest starred as Olivia, Tucker's ex-wife. Christa B. Allen appeared in a recurring role as Robyn, a corporate lawyer working at Riley's law firm, who later begins dating Danny. Eddie Cibrian appeared in a multi-episode arc as Ross, a guy that Riley falls for, later discovering that he is her boss. Jackée Harry guest starred as Judge Johnson in the episode "Lowering the Bar". The episode reunited Harry with Tahj Mowry, Mowry made numerous guest appearances on Harry's 1990s sitcom Sister, Sister. In the episode "Home Is Where the Wheeler Is", Alex Kapp Horner is now playing the role of Jennifer, Riley's mom, which was originally played by Caroline Rhea in season 2 episode "On The Lamb-y". Reba McEntire guest starred in the season finale "It's a Nice Day for a Wheeler Wedding", reuniting with her former Reba co-star Melissa Peterman.

No. overall	No. in season	Title	Directed by	Written by	Original release date	Prod. code	U.S. viewers (millions)
48	1	"Strip or Treat"	Michael Lembeck	Frank Pines	October 22, 2014	4021	0.89
On Halloween, Ben, Danny and Tucker all end up in jail after crashing a bachelorette party. Bonnie has a date with Javier (Matt Cedeño), a handsome Latin man, with a secret. Riley attempts to Halloween prank Tucker and the Wheelers after years of being the victim of their pranks.
49	2	"It's a Wonderful Emma"	Michael Lembeck	Heidi Clements	December 10, 2014	4022	0.78
Feeling overwhelmed by Christmas, Ben wishes the holiday never existed, which comes to pass, while also in the process removing the existence of Emma.
50	3	"She Loves Me, She Loves Me Note"	Michael Lembeck	Dan Berendsen & Heidi Clements	January 14, 2015	4001	0.96
Ben has suspicions that Riley and Danny have feelings for each other, after seeing them almost kiss, so he leaves a note in her purse to express his love for her. However, Riley thinks that the note is from Danny, which further intensifies Ben's suspicions. With Danny moving to Paris to be with Georgie, Bonnie tries to come up with other ways to make money by starting a baby-sitting business and continuing her sports memorabilia business while Danny is still in town.
51	4	"I See Crazy People"	Michael Lembeck	Dan Berendsen & Heidi Clements	January 21, 2015	4002	0.75
Riley feels that her and Ben are not compatible enough to be a couple, to prove otherwise, they see a psychic who has set up shop at the bar. After Georgie breaks up with him, Danny lives with Brad, to continue the guise that he is in Paris with Georgie.
52	5	"Mugging for the Camera"	Michael Lembeck	Kirill Baru & Eric Zimmerman	January 28, 2015	4003	0.80
Danny is now living in Riley's place, to continue to avoid letting his family know that he is back in town. Tired of interviewing celebrities, Mary Hart puts pressure on Tucker to find a "regular person" to be a guest on her talk show. Bonnie tries exploiting Emma by putting her in ridiculous outfits to make money.
53	6	"Over My Dead Bonnie"	Michael Lembeck	Janae Bakken	February 4, 2015	4004	0.61
Ben and Tucker are fed up with Bonnie still living at their place, so they try to trick the person who is currently subletting Bonnie's apartment into thinking that Bonnie is dead, so Bonnie can move back in. Danny is offered an acting role as himself on General Hospital and soon catches the romantic eye of actress Kelly Monaco.
54	7	"The Mother of All Dates"	Michael Lembeck	Ben Montanio & Vince Cheung	February 11, 2015	4005	0.65
Ben and Danny make a bet that can set Bonnie up with the perfect guy. Ben tries to set her up with one of his customers Frank (Peter Katona) and Danny tries to set her up with Ben's boss Mr. Henderson (David S. Lee). Meanwhile, Riley and Tucker get involved with Sondra's troubled married life, with Tucker getting caught up even deeper.
55	8	"House of Cards"	Michael Lembeck	Janae Bakken	February 18, 2015	4006	0.73
Tucker wants to end is relationship with Sondra, however she beats him to the punch by breaking up with him first. Tucker then reminisces about his ex-girlfriend from college named Olivia (Aisha Dee). Danny then pulls some strings having Olivia show up to reunite with Tucker, not knowing that Tucker once married her, but only did so she could stay in the country to get her green card. Meanwhile, after being passed over for a promotion at her law firm by a male employee, Riley is encouraged by Bonnie to spend frivolously with the company credit card.
56	9	"An Officer and a Gentle Ben"	Michael Lembeck	Kirill Baru & Eric Zimmerman	February 25, 2015	4007	0.78
Fleet Week makes its way to the city, with Ben and Tucker pretending to be in the navy to pick up women. Riley's conflicting feelings for Danny begins to show when Robyn (Christa B. Allen), a co-worker of hers, shows romantic interest in him. Bonnie turns down the marriage proposal of Hudson (Isaiah Mustafa), a navy captain that she had sexual flings with in the past.
57	10	"Happy Birthday Two You"	Michael Lembeck	Frank Pines	March 4, 2015	4008	0.80
Ben is tasked to come with a surprise party for Bonnie's birthday, in doing so he accidentally blurts out a family secret concerning Danny. While in the care of Riley and Tucker, Emma falls out of a chair and gets stitches on her head, with Riley and Tucker attempting to hide Emma's injury from the Wheelers.
58	11	"You Give Real Estate a Bad Name"	Michael Lembeck	Vince Cheung & Ben Montanio	March 11, 2015	4009	0.66
Bonnie and Brad compete to sell the penthouse that used to belong to Jon Bon Jovi. While Bonnie and Brad are competing, Riley and Tucker compete to have the penthouse for themselves before it is sold. After Ben and Robyn go to a concert as friends, Danny fears that Ben will put the romantic moves on her, knowing of Ben's womanizing past.
59	12	"A Love/Fate Relationship"	Michael Lembeck	Dan Berendsen	March 18, 2015	4010	0.72
Riley feels it's finally time to tell Danny about her feelings for him, just as he is about to go on a weekend getaway with Robyn. Seeing Tucker depressed from online dating, Ben and Bonnie create a secret admirer for him with the photo of a model. Only to find out that the model whose name is Christine lives in the city and is an actual secret admirer of Tucker.
60	13	"Home Is Where the Wheeler Is"	Michael Lembeck	Heidi Clements	June 3, 2015	4011	0.77
Riley goes back to her childhood home in New Jersey seeking comfort from her mom Jennifer (Alex Kapp Horner), and is embarrassed about Danny turning down her romantic feelings for him. Ben then goes to see Riley to have her come back. Evelyn, an elderly neighbor that lived across the hall from Ben and Tucker dies, with Bonnie trying to convince Ashley (Lindsey Gort), Evelyn's granddaughter and beneficiary into getting the listing for the vacant apartment. Bonnie then tries to get Danny to go on a date with Ashley, to get the listing, even though he is still dating Robyn. Tucker having been nice to Evelyn before she died, hopes to get a few valuable things that she promised him.
61	14	"It Takes a Village Idiot"	Michael Lembeck	Janae Bakken	June 10, 2015	4012	0.74
Tucker, Riley, Danny and Bonnie are all tired of being exploited by Ben who always passes off Emma to them to go on dates. They take a stand, with Ben having to fend for himself when taking care of Emma, all while continuing to have a dating life. Bonnie and Danny take a cooking class taught by Tommy Kwan (Brian Tee), a popular chef who turns out to be a misogynist. With Danny not talking to Riley as much as he used to, she takes advice from Tucker and creates a fake boyfriend to try to make Danny jealous. Tucker also still pretends that he is still dating Christine, even though she has not spoken to him in weeks.
62	15	"One Night Stand Off"	Michael Lembeck	Ben Montanio & Vince Cheung	June 17, 2015	4013	0.63
Ben and Riley play a game of "shot and score", first taking a shot of vodka and asking a random stranger out. Ben's "score" is Jessica (Hilty Bowen), who he sleeps with and later finds out that she is married to Ian (Luke Cook), a restaurateur trying to buy the Bar on B. While Riley's "score" is Ross (Eddie Cibrian), an older man, who she sleeps with and later finds out is her boss at her law firm. Bonnie comes and goes from Riley's office to make copies for her realty business. Danny and Tucker try to one-up each other teaching Emma bad habits and tricks. In the end, Danny buys the Bar on B and he and Ben now own it.
63	16	"Lowering the Bar"	Michael Lembeck	Kirill Baru & Eric Zimmerman	June 24, 2015	4014	0.80
Fearing that Ben and Danny don't have what it takes to run the Bar on B, Bonnie tries sabotage the working relationship between her sons. Meanwhile, Tucker asks Riley to represent him in a court case that involved him nearly being hurt near a construction site. Judge Johnson (Jackée Harry), the judge presiding over Tucker's case, has a strong sexual attraction for him.
64	17	"Wheeler War"	Michael Lembeck	Joshua Malek	July 1, 2015	4015	0.84
To sabotage Riley and Ross' relationship, Ben invites Ross to the boys' game and poker nights. Riley responds by declaring a "Wheeler War", a strenuous athletic competition. In the meantime, Bonnie competes in the war, because she wants to play poker with the boys, despite Tucker's strong opposition.
65	18	"Parental Guidance"	Michael Lembeck	Marissa Berlin	July 8, 2015	4016	0.76
After getting a medical physical and waiting to hear the results for it, Ben is worried about who will be the legal guardian for Emma if he were to die. After some convincing he chooses Riley as Emma's guardian and his medical physical results are fine. Brad pretending to his twin brother Tad tries to win Bonnie back. When Brad's plan falls apart, he then stages a flash mob to the song "All of Me" and proposes to Bonnie, with her saying yes.
66	19	"Ring Around the Party"	Michael Lembeck	Frank Pines	July 15, 2015	4017	0.71
Bonnie hates the engagement ring that Brad gave her, with Tucker volunteering to make it is "disappear". She soon regrets her decision after learning that the ring is an heirloom of Brad's family. After being told about the past romantic relationship between Ben and Riley, Ross demands that Ben not show up to the cocktail party that Riley is throwing. After dating for a number of weeks, Danny is unable to figure out Ashley's last name.
67	20	"Till Dress Do Us Part"	Michael Lembeck	Heidi Clements and Frank Pines	July 22, 2015	4018	0.62
Bonnie leaves Ben, Danny, Riley and Tucker responsible for watching her wedding dress, which undergoes one disaster after another. Meanwhile, Ben, Danny and Riley reminisce on their past love triangle entanglements.
68	21	"What Happens in Vegas"	Michael Lembeck	Dan Berendsen & Heidi Clements	July 29, 2015	4019	0.93
Danny and Riley are appointed the best man and maid of honor respectively for Bonnie and Brad's wedding. Danny and Riley are also both given the responsibility of planning the bachelor and bachelorette parties for Brad and Bonnie. Tucker takes his annual trip to Las Vegas to live his dream as a lounge singer, but Brad, Riley and the Wheelers intrude on his fun by also going to Vegas. Tired of hearing Ben talk about his love for Riley, Danny finally reveals his feelings for Riley to Ben and he does not take the news well.
69	22	"It's a Nice Day for a Wheeler Wedding"	Michael Lembeck	Dan Berendsen & Heidi Clements	August 5, 2015	4020	0.91
Bonnie and Brad's wedding day closely arrives and the wedding planner bails the day the before the wedding. Therefore, Bonnie has her old friend Charlotte (Reba McEntire) plan the big day, until Tucker finds out that it was Charlotte who has been sabotaging the wedding day all along, as revenge for Bonnie sleeping with her fiance. Ben finally decides to step aside and let Danny and Riley become a couple, but it's one crazy mishap after another to find common ground with their love. Bonnie and Charlotte later clear up their misunderstanding, that it was Charlotte's other tall blonde friend that slept with her fiance not Bonnie. At the wedding ceremony with Ben officiating, he eggs Danny and Riley on to face their true feelings for each other ruining Bonnie and Brad's ceremony. Danny then proposes to Riley, with her being hesitant to give him an answer.

=== Season 5 (2016) ===
The fifth season premiered on February 3, 2016, under ABC Family's new name Freeform. Allie Gonino was cast in a recurring role as Sam Saffe, a girl who applies for the manager position at the Bar on B. Ben also had a crush on her in high school and she was not very nice to Riley during that time. However, for unknown reasons, Daniella Monet replaced Gonino in the role. Production on the season began in August 2015 and was temporarily halted on October 26, after Jean-Luc Bilodeau was hospitalized the weekend before.

No. overall	No. in season	Title	Directed by	Written by	Original release date	Prod. code	U.S. viewers (millions)
70	1	"Love and Carriage"	Michael Lembeck	Heidi Clements	February 3, 2016	5001	0.62
Riley faints after being proposed to by Danny, and says that she has no memory of the proposal, it is later revealed that she faked the fainting and lied about forgetting, because she is not ready to take that next step in her relationship with Danny. With Danny and Riley now a couple, Ben decides to move on by setting a date with a woman named Zoey (Jonna Walsh), who has just moved into the building, with Ben later finding out that she is pregnant. After having her wedding ruined by Danny and Riley, Bonnie asks for Tucker's help so she and Brad can get married in private.
71	2	"Reinventing the Wheeler"	Michael Lembeck	Kirill Baru & Eric Zimmerman	February 10, 2016	5002	0.48
When Emma starts calling women that she becomes close to "mommy", Ben feels it is finally time to settle down and find the right woman for him, with a little help from Riley. To improve his performance on the ice, Danny and Bonnie smoke a stash of marijuana, the day before Danny is mandated to take a team drug test.
72	3	"Ben-geance"	Michael Lembeck	Vince Cheung & Ben Montanio	February 17, 2016	5003	0.61
Sam Saffe (Daniella Monet), a girl who went to high school with Ben, Danny and Riley, applies for the manager position at the Bar on B. Ben gives Sam the job, and plans to fire her later as revenge for not noticing him in their high school days. Even while Ben continues with his plan of vengeance, he continues to have romantic feelings for Sam. Danny has hard time telling Riley that her cooking is terrible. Fresh off her honeymoon with Brad, Bonnie already wants to divorce him.
73	4	"The Tuck Stops Here"	Michael Lembeck	Janae Bakken	February 24, 2016	5004	0.59
When a video of Mary Hart berating Tucker goes viral, thanks to Emma accidentally uploading it online, it's up to Ben to try make things right. With Brad volunteering in Peru, after his brother Tad's death, Bonnie is left alone and wants to spend all of her free time with Danny, much to Riley's chagrin.
74	5	"The Dating Game"	Michael Lembeck	Frank Pines	March 2, 2016	5005	0.47
Ben finally wants to make the move and ask Sam on a date, but has Danny set up the date instead, which has Sam misunderstanding that Danny asked her out. Zoey is nervous about asking Ben out, and has Tucker set up the date for them, with Tucker misunderstanding that Zoey is into him. Riley is forced to take on a big divorce case of Joan Carpenter (Ginifer King) a frequent wine drinker, and the sister of one of the law firm partners. Riley then sets up Joan to hang out with Bonnie, unaware that Joan is a lesbian and learns that she has romantic feelings for Bonnie.
75	6	"Never Ben Jealous"	Michael Lembeck	Joshua Malek	March 9, 2016	5006	0.57
Ben wants to prove that Danny is jealous of Riley's continued friendship with him, so he is willing to put himself in awkward situations involving Riley to get Danny in a jealous rage. Tucker continues to have casual sexual flings with Sondra, but ends up finally calling things off for good, having reached his patience with her annoying high-pitched voice. Tucker later ends up changing his mind, when he hears that Sondra's voice is a lot more pleasant and deeper when she drinks alcohol, so he has her drink all the time when she is with him. Riley is tasked with giving a heartfelt speech to Benard Bender (Tom Fitzpatrick), one of the elderly founding members of her law firm who is retiring. Bonnie plans to use the opportunity to get close to Mr. Bender to elevate her real estate business.
76	7	"The Return of the Mommy"	Michael Lembeck	Heidi Clements	March 16, 2016	5007	0.53
Angela is back in town, now with a hit TV show, after being a struggling actress for years. She wants to spend quality time with Emma, but Ben refuses to allow her to do so. Ben later changes his mind when Angela convinces him that she can pull some strings to get Emma admitted into a prestigious preschool. While Angela is spending time with Emma, Ben asks Riley to keep an eye on them. With Sam temporarily out of town, Bonnie takes over as manager of the Bar on B, and comes up with ridiculous ideas to boost business. After being fired by Mary Hart, Tucker writes an anonymous blog about her, and thinks that she is out to get revenge on him because of his demeaning posts.
77	8	"Room-mating"	Michael Lembeck	Kirill Baru & Eric Zimmerman	March 23, 2016	5008	0.44
Ben attempts to get Sam to move into Danny's room in his and Tucker's place by stirring up conflict between Danny and Riley to question why they don't live together, so they ultimately can. Bonnie gets hired by a big time real estate agency and hires Tucker as her assistant.
78	9	"Stupid Cupid"	Michael Lembeck	Frank Pines	March 30, 2016	5009	0.46
Riley tries to set up Ben and Zoey together, due to them both having the same interests, but neither of them are willing to express their true feelings for each other. Danny and Tucker audition for the sportscasting and weatherman jobs respectively at their local news station, but Tim Turner (Cedric Yarbrough), the station manager, gives Danny the weatherman job.
79	10	"Homecoming and Going"	Michael Lembeck	Dan Berendsen	April 6, 2016	5010	0.59
Sam invites Ben, Danny and Riley to the Hamptons for a weekend getaway. Riley suspects that Sam will use the getaway as an opportunity to make romantic moves on Ben, now that Sam knows that he has romantic feelings for Zoey, and Riley still wanting Ben and Zoey to be together. An old home video of Ben, Danny, Riley and Sam at a homecoming party back in their high school days uncovers hidden secrets. A misunderstanding via FaceTime, has Bonnie believing that Brad has met someone else in his trip to Peru. While Ben, Danny and Sam are away, Tucker has the apartment all to himself, until Bonnie leaves Emma with him to mingle after being "heartbroken" by Brad. On Bonnie's night out, she meets Luther (Jonathan Silverman), an absent-minded, bumbling guy.
80	11	"Trial by Liar"	Michael Lembeek	Janae Bakken	June 1, 2016	5011	0.57
Riley is still heartbroken about finding out that Danny and Sam slept with each other back in high school and puts in Danny in a mock trial over her broken heart. Ben blackmails Zoey into pretending to date him, to get over losing the opportunity he had to sleep with Sam, despite the fact that Zoey is back together with her baby's father, Aaron. A fight then erupts at the Bar on B, between Ben and Aaron, which lands both men in jail.
81	12	"Ben-Semination"	Michael Lembeck	Vince Cheung & Ben Montana	June 8, 2016	5012	0.59
With encouragement from Tucker, Ben decides to donate his sperm to a sperm bank to make some extra cash, while Tucker uses the opportunity to get close with the attractive nurse working at the sperm bank. However, Ben begins to have second thoughts about donating after finding out that a couple choose his sperm to have their child. Danny and Riley must follow through with planning an engagement party for a couple that they previously set up. Bonnie and Riley's mom Jennifer use the party to get Danny and Riley back together.
82	13	"High School Diplomacy"	Michael Lembeck	Joshua Malek	June 15, 2016	5013	0.80
To be good role model to Emma, Ben reveals that he didn't graduate from high school, and proceeds get his diploma. It is also revealed that Bonnie didn't graduate either, so they both must take a makeup biology exam to get their diplomas. In preparing for his exam, Ben becomes attracted to the exam proctor and his old biology teacher Sara Gilcrest (Jamie-Lynn Sigler). Bonnie is too lazy to study for the exam, so she has Tucker help her cheat. Danny, Sam and Riley are inducted in their old high school athletic hall of fame, with Sam and Riley both being upset that Danny has a prime position in the school for his display while they get terrible ones.
83	14	"Not So Great Grandma"	Michael Lembeck	Heidi Clements	June 22, 2016	5014	0.61
Bonnie's mother, Nana Lyle (Loni Anderson) visits, bringing up unresolved feelings between Bonnie and her. To better perform at their jobs, Riley and Tucker take an improv acting class held by Stanley Dexenberry (Tim Bagley), an eccentric stage actor.
84	15	"Unholy Matrimony"	Michael Lembeck	Kirill Baru & Eric Zimmerman	June 29, 2016	5015	0.59
Ben pretends to be Brad, to impress Bonnie's co-workers, who do not believe Bonnie when she says that she is married to a hot younger guy. As part of a publicity stunt, Danny agrees to date Elena Rios (Alicia Sanz), a movie star from Spain. This immediately makes Riley jealous thinking Danny and Elena's relationship is real, having her rekindle her romantic relationship her boss Ross. Tucker is anxious to use Danny and Elena's publicity stunt scoop as his big break for his entertainment reporting career.
85	16	"Double Date Double Down"	Michael Lembeek	Frank Pines	July 6, 2016	5016	0.56
As the relationships between Ben and Sara and Riley and Ross continue on, both Ben and Riley become tired of their partners and agree to go on a double date to try to come up with whatever they can to have their partners break up with them. Bonnie and Tucker begin betting on Danny's hockey games.
86	17	"The Love Seat"	Michael Lembeck	Janae Bakken	July 13, 2016	5017	0.58
Ben finds an old beat up chair in the street which serves as the centerpiece of misunderstandings between him and Sam, as well as Danny and Riley, with secret admirer notes being left on the chair. Bonnie and Riley assist Tucker on his exposé on the harsh world of child pageantry, by having Emma sign up as a competitor.
87	18	"She Said, Ben Said"	Michael Lembeck	Jen Howell	July 20, 2016	5018	0.54
Ben and Sam are finally a couple, and decide to have their first date. However, misunderstandings on what they want on the date, lead to Danny and Riley getting involved in their relationship, making matters worse. Tucker is dating his dad's secretary Renee (Chelsea Harris). After getting suspicious assumptions from Bonnie, Tucker begins to believe that his dad is also dating Renee, thus exposing all Tucker's ageism, hypocrisy and prejudice against not-the-same-age couples or relationships.
88	19	"Condom Conundrum"	Michael Lembeck	Ben Montanio & Vince Cheung	July 27, 2016	5019	0.48
Emma pokes holes in Ben's condoms using Bonnie's lost earring. Danny and Tucker have also been using Ben's condoms causing a pregnancy scare among the guys fearing that their respective significant others Riley, Rene and Sam are pregnant. Riley has difficulty dealing with an incompetent new assistant and asks for Bonnie's advice on firing him.
89	20	"My Fair Emma"	Michael Lembeck	Dan Berendsen & Heidi Clements	August 3, 2016	5020	0.56
While booking a booth for the Bar on B for a street festival, Ben completely forgets about Emma's birthday, so he plans to celebrate Emma while also looking after the booth. Danny gets an offer to play for the Vancouver Canucks, putting his relationship with Riley in jeopardy. Tucker gets an entertainment reporting job in Los Angeles. Brad returns from Peru with a new bearded look and a new outlook on life, instantly turning off Bonnie. After a pony accident leaving Emma with a broken arm, everyone agrees to stay in New York to continue to help Ben raise Emma. Riley then reveals that she is pregnant with Danny's child. Ben feels that he may have met the girl of his dreams, despite only spending brief moments together with her.

=== Season 6 (2017) ===
The sixth season and the final season premiered on March 13, 2017, ending with the 100th episode.

No. overall	No. in season	Title	Directed by	Written by	Original release date	Prod. code	U.S. viewers (millions)
90	1	"To Elle and Back"	Michael Lembeck	Heidi Clements	March 13, 2017	6001	0.61
Ben continues his quest to find the mystery girl that he met at the dry cleaners months ago. He then ends up sleeping with Olivia (Natalie Dreyfuss) and Amanda (Victoria Park), who he later finds out are friends with his mystery girl, whose name is Elle (Katie Gill). Riley is already stressed out carrying Danny's child, in addition she does not want to deal with Bonnie overseeing her pregnancy. She tells Danny to encourage Bonnie to go on a year-long trip with Brad. Tucker returns home from Los Angeles and refuses to give details on why he had such a bad experience there.
91	2	"Pro and Con"	Michael Lembeck	Frank Pines	March 20, 2017	6002	0.41
Ben is convinced that Tucker's latest fling Kiki (Nathalia Castellon) is a prostitute, and with Danny's help is willing to prove all that he can that he is right. Just as Bonnie and Brad are about go on their year-long trip, Brad is arrested for real estate fraud with Bonnie then pressuring Riley to represent him in his case.
92	3	"Ben Rides a Unicorn"	Michael Lembeck	Eric Zimmerman & Kirill Baru	March 27, 2017	6003	0.50
Ben moves Emma into Danny's old room, and finally has his old room to himself since Emma's arrival. To christen his room, Ben has fallen for a "unicorn", a woman who just wants sex and no emotional ties, which makes Ben very happy proving Riley wrong. Danny accomplishes his lifelong dream of fighting in a wrestling match, his opponent is Ryan Davidson (John Hennigan), who trained with Danny at the New York Rangers training camp and previously slept with Bonnie.
93	4	"A Mother of a Day"	Michael Lembeck	Ben Montanio & Vince Cheung	April 3, 2017	6004	0.41
Tucker is nominated for a prestigious television production award for the Mother's Day special that he produced back when he worked for Mary Hart. When Ben suggests that he invites his emotionally cold mother Dr. Joanne Dobbs (Tricia O'Kelley) to the award ceremony, Bonnie instead steps in pretending to be Tucker's mom. Riley is up for the junior partner position at her law firm, but has not told them about her pregnancy fearing it will affect her promotion.
94	5	"When Elle Freezes Over"	Michael Lembeck	Janae Bakken	April 10, 2017	6005	0.47
Sam re-enters Ben's life just as Bonnie is hired by Elle, the mystery girl that Ben has been looking for. Bonnie feels that Elle (who is going by her full first name Elizabeth) is the right girl for Ben, despite the fact that Ben and Sam are now fully back together. Tucker is desperate to play the male lead in an ice skating show starring the actress from his favorite children's program that he watches with Emma. Riley begins spending more time with Emma as practice before her baby is born.
95	6	"The Third Wheeler"	Michael Lembeck	Joshua Malek	April 17, 2017	6006	0.45
Danny stresses out Riley with advice from his baby parenting book, so Ben comes to the rescue to take Riley away on a hiking trip in the woods. Bonnie learns that her and Brad's boss Luis Bustamonte (Juan Monsalvez) is responsible for Brad being arrested for real estate fraud, so she asks Tucker for help to get a confession from Luis.
96	7	"The Sonny-Moon"	Michael Lembeck	Heidi Clements	April 24, 2017	6007	0.33
Ben and Danny compete to go on a cruise with Bonnie. Meanwhile, Tucker accompanies Riley to a lamaze class and runs into Adrienne (Davida Williams), his ex-girlfriend from high school. Tucker then asks Riley to pretend to be his wife, to make it look like his life is super successful since Adrienne dumped him back in high school.
97	8	"You Cruise, You Lose"	Michael Lembeck	Eric Zimmerman & Kirill Baru	May 1, 2017	6008	0.47
Annabelle (Alex Frnka), a bride having second thoughts about her wedding shows up at the bar claiming that Ben is her soulmate, even though Ben has absolutely no memory of her. Bonnie stows away on the cruise trip that was originally planned for her and Brad, later giving the tickets to Danny and Riley. Bonnie then makes a deal with Danny to try to get Riley to marry him on the trip, even though Riley does not want to get married yet because she is self-conscious about her pregnancy. After getting kicked off the cruise because of Bonnie's shenanigans, Danny and Riley finally tie the knot at Ben and Tucker's place.
98	9	"The Rebound"	Michael Lembeck	Vince Cheung & Ben Montanio	May 8, 2017	6009	0.42
Sondra is recently dumped and Ben volunteers to be her "rebound guy" so Tucker (whose romantic feelings for Sondra have re-ignited) can swoop in to have a serious relationship with her again. Riley tells Danny that she wants to move out of the building for a bigger apartment for when the baby is born. Danny then tries his best to fix their place unbeknownst to Riley. Bonnie and Riley stay in a department store after hours to get an extravagant crib for Riley's baby at half price.
99	10	"What's in the Box?!"	Michael Lembeck	Dan Berendsen	May 15, 2017	6010	0.46
Brad's trial finally begins, with Riley being completely reliant on an impending box of evidence to prove Brad's innocence. Ben and Danny go to extra lengths to find out the sex of Danny and Riley's baby. With Judge Johnson presiding over Brad's case, Tucker uses the opportunity to audition to be her sidekick for her upcoming syndicated court show.
100	11	"Daddy's Girl"	Michael Lembeck	Dan Berendsen	May 22, 2017	6011	0.54
An upcoming recital at Emma's dance class has her questioning where her mother is, with Ben wondering about his future as a single dad. Tucker helps Danny find a push gift to mark Riley's impending labor. Elle tracks Ben down at the dance recital, but they finally meet at Riley's delivery room where she finally gives birth after numerous false alarms. Ben finds out that Elle is a doctor, she then delivers Riley's baby and Ben and Elle begin their courtship. In the end, Ben talks to Emma and tells her despite him dating Elle, Emma will always be the number one girl in his life.

== Ratings ==
Baby Daddy : U.S. viewers per episode (millions)

Season	Episode number																						Average
Season	1	2	3	4	5	6	7	8	9	10	11	12	13	14	15	16	17	18	19	20	21	22	Average
1	1.65	1.72	1.44	1.10	1.39	1.10	1.12	1.32	1.25	1.40	–												1.35
2	0.86	0.80	0.90	0.72	1.02	0.85	0.71	1.02	0.83	1.02	0.87	0.74	0.92	1.35	1.27	1.11	–						0.91
3	1.10	1.10	1.29	1.03	0.98	0.84	0.86	0.79	0.73	0.90	0.87	0.92	0.88	0.79	0.91	0.71	0.75	0.92	0.78	0.69	0.80	–	0.89
4	0.89	0.78	0.96	0.75	0.80	0.61	0.65	0.73	0.78	0.80	0.66	0.72	0.77	0.74	0.63	0.80	0.84	0.76	0.71	0.62	0.93	0.91	0.77
5	0.62	0.48	0.61	0.59	0.47	0.57	0.53	0.44	0.46	0.59	0.57	0.59	0.80	0.61	0.59	0.56	0.58	0.54	0.48	0.56	–		0.56
6	0.61	0.41	0.50	0.41	0.47	0.45	0.33	0.47	0.42	0.46	0.54	–											0.46

Audience measurement performed by Nielsen Media Research
