= Wizards of Waverly Place season 1 =

Wizards of Waverly Place
- Season 1
- Wizards of Waverly Place season one cast
- No. of episodes: 21

Release
- Original network: Disney Channel
- Original release: October 12, 2007 – August 31, 2008

Season chronology
- Next → Season 2

The first season of Wizards of Waverly Place aired on Disney Channel from October 12, 2007 to August 31, 2008. The season introduces the Russo children, Alex (Selena Gomez), Justin (David Henrie), and Max Russo (Jake T. Austin) as they compete to become the leading wizard in their family. Maria Canals Barrera and David DeLuise star as their parents and Jennifer Stone co-stars as Alex's best friend, Harper Finkle.

Guest stars and recurring cast include: Amanda Tepe as Monotone Woman, Skyler Samuels as Gigi Hollingsworth, Bill Chott as Mr. Laritate, Daryl Sabara as T.J. Taylor, Brian Kubach as Riley, Shane Lyons as Manny Kin, Eric Allan Kramer as Coach Gunderson, Chelsea Staub as Kari Landsdorf, Sara Paxton as Millie, Julie Brown as Ms. Angela and Jeff Garlin as Uncle Kelbo.

== Production ==
The series was created and as executive produced by Todd J. Greenwald, who began developing the show after working as a writer and consulting producer during the first season of Hannah Montana. The show is produced by It's a Laugh Productions and Disney Channel Original Productions. The theme song, "Everything Is Not What It Seems", written by John Adair and Steve Hampton, is of techno-pop style and is performed by Selena Gomez. The series is filmed at Hollywood Center Studios in Hollywood, California.

== Premise ==
Set on Waverly Place in Manhattan, New York's Greenwich Village neighborhood, Wizards of Waverly Place centers on the Italian-Mexican Russo family, which includes Alex (Selena Gomez), her older brother Justin (David Henrie) and their younger brother Max (Jake T. Austin). The three Russo siblings are wizards in training and live with their Italian-American father Jerry (David DeLuise), a former wizard, and their Mexican-American mother Theresa, who is a mortal. Alex also has a mortal friend, Harper (Jennifer Stone), who at first does not know the Russos are wizards.

== Theme song ==
The theme song begins with Alex (Selena Gomez) waking up in the morning with her alarm clock going off. She uses a spell to make the time 6:30. She then goes into the bathroom where Justin (David Henrie) is looking at himself in the mirror and spitting out mouthwash when Alex pushes him to the side. He gets annoyed and then uses magic to trap her in the mirror. In the kitchen, Max (Jake T. Austin) has an orange which he turns into a vanilla cupcake. Meanwhile, Harper (Jennifer Stone) meets Alex at the front door and shows off her watermelon shirt. Back at the kitchen, Max is about to put his cupcake into his backpack when his mother, Theresa (Maria Canals Barrera), makes him turn it back into an orange. Alex is telling Max to hurry up. In the lair, Jerry (David DeLuise) is yelling to someone when a laptop flies away. He then goes to retrieve it. In the sub shop, Alex opens her book bag, which the laptop goes into (meanwhile Harper was distracted not seeing anything). Jerry lectures her as the main title card appears. Then the four friends walk to school. Throughout the sequence, the furniture in the background seems to be moving around.

== Release ==
The show debuted on Disney Channel on October 12, 2007 after the premiere of Twitches Too, gathering 5.9 million viewers. In February 2009, the episode "Helping Hand" broke the record for the largest audience in the 7:00 PM (Eastern Time) time period on the Disney Channel, with a total of 4.5 million viewers. In January 2010, "Wizards vs. Werewolves" one-hour special episode became the series' most-watched episode with 6.2 million viewers, surpassing the 6 million viewers of "Paint By Committee" episode In 2009, the series was the top scripted telecast for teens between the age of 9–14 (1.63 million/6.7 rating) and second in kids 6–11 (1.81 million/7.4 rating), which was only slightly behind "The Suite Life on Deck" (1.82 million/7.4 rating.)

== Cast ==
- Selena Gomez as Alex Russo
- David Henrie as Justin Russo
- Jake T. Austin as Max Russo
- Jennifer Stone as Harper Finkle
- Maria Canals Barrera as Theresa Russo
- David DeLuise as Jerry Russo

== Episodes ==
Wizards of Waverly Place Season 1 episodes
No. overall	No. in season	Title	Directed by	Written by	Original release date	Prod. code	U.S. viewers (millions)
1	1	"Crazy 10-Minute Sale"	Fred Savage	Todd J. Greenwald	October 12, 2007	102	5.9
Rebellious wizard girl Alex wants to go to the Crazy 10-Minute Sale, an annual clothing sale which lasts for ten minutes where every item is very inexpensive in order to get a jacket she wants at a very low sale price. Unfortunately, her dad, Jerry, will not let her go because she has wizard class that day. However, after duplicating herself using the Edgebono Utoosis spell, she leaves her clone at wizard class. But the clone will not talk but bark like a dog. Alex's plans to find the jacket change when Harper informs her that her mom, Theresa, is at the sale with her, and Gigi, her enemy, hides the jacket. When Alex's dad, Jerry, finds out she skipped class, he goes and gets her. While he is gone, Alex's younger brother, Max, gets a new wand and toys with Alex's clone. But whatever Max does to the clone using the E-Mimic feature on his wand, Alex does the same thing, exposing her clearly to her mom and dad, Theresa and Jerry. Alex exposes Gigi's real name (Gertrude) in order to get the jacket. Guest star: Skyler Samuels as Gigi
2	2	"First Kiss"	Joe Regalbuto	Vince Cheung & Ben Montanio	October 19, 2007	104	4.8
Alex's older brother, Justin, is going out with a girl called Miranda, but he cannot seem to work up the courage to kiss her. Meanwhile, Max creates a sandwich that is among the few being considered to become the official sandwich of the New York Mets. Justin goes to the cinema with Miranda, where he tries to kiss her but messes it up. Alex uses a spell to rewind time to give Justin another chance to kiss Miranda, which he botches again and again, and Alex ends up rewinding time for Justin 17 times. As this is happening, Alex's time manipulation affects what the officials from the New York Mets think of Max's sandwich. The spell to rewind time (which purportedly gives mortals déjà vu) makes Max's unique sandwich ultimately bore the taste testers, who are unaware that they have in fact tasted Max's sandwich 17 times. This ruins the chances for it to become the New York Mets' official sandwich. Jerry, who is at the sandwich tasting, deduces that Alex keeps rewinding time and heads to the cinema to stop her. In the end, he is supportive of Justin and lets Alex rewind time for a final eighteenth occurrence for Justin to get his first kiss. The family's frustration over the sandwich fiasco is quickly forgotten when they discover that Justin just had his first kiss. When it is discovered that Alex has not yet had her own first kiss, Justin teases her, but she gets back at him by kissing a random boy right in front of him the next day. Guest stars: Lucy Hale as Miranda, Wayne Federman as Mr. Kaminsky, Bryant Johnson as Matt, Jim Wise as Mr. Malone
3	3	"I Almost Drowned in a Chocolate Fountain"	Joe Regalbuto	Gigi McCreery & Perry Rein	October 26, 2007	105	3.7
Alex decides to cheat on her Spanish test using pocket elves, who have in-depth knowledge of diverse subjects. She cheats successfully and is allowed to go on a date that night with Riley. To get revenge for Alex's snitching, Justin and Max try to plant the pocket elf in her purse, who then bites her, causing her to have Chocoholism (an uncontrollable craving for chocolate), which also causes her to humiliate herself in front of the entire restaurant. Guest stars: Brian Kubach as Riley, Al Madrigal as Spanish Pocket Elf, Jack Plotnick as Pocket Elf
4	4	"New Employee"	Bob Berlinger	Peter Murrieta	November 2, 2007	107	3.0
After Harper complains that she and Alex never spend time together anymore, Alex decides to tell her parents to hire Harper. She somehow convinces her parents to actually hire her, but it turns out that Harper is a complete klutz and has never worked a real day in her life. After Harper causes complete destruction for an hour, Alex's parents tell her to either make Harper improve immediately or they will fire her. Alex uses "The Serving Wench Spell" to help Harper overcome her skills of an oaf. However, her plan backfires when Harper becomes a strict workaholic, leading Alex to fire her best friend. Meanwhile, Justin starts a tutoring business that makes the young local tutor Frankie mad. Frankie tries to get back at Justin by having a bunch of kids try to beat him up. In order to get back at Frankie, Justin gets his dumb, yet strong, students to scare and beat up Frankie and his friends in the yogurt parlor. Harper has been working for only a few hours but suddenly becomes Employee of the Month. Alex then runs into the scene, where Harper is making everyone who wants to use the restroom order something. Alex tries very badly to apologize to Harper, which does not exactly work out, so she uses another spell to ruin Harper's great waitressing skills. They make up while covered in frozen yogurt. Guest star: Paulie Litt as Frankie Absent: Jake T. Austin as Max Russo
5	5	"Disenchanted Evening"	Mark Cendrowski	Jack Sanderson	November 9, 2007	114	4.6
Alex meets fellow wizard T.J. Taylor at school, who charmed his parents with magic to let him use magic anytime he wants. This is what Alex wants from her more conservative mom and dad; in a twisted turn of events, Jerry and Theresa are charmed by a noodle kugel to obey Alex's wishes, but Alex soon dislikes their laid-back attitude and tries to restore them to their usual selves. Guest star: Daryl Sabara as T.J. Absent: Jennifer Stone as Harper Finkle
6	6	"You Can't Always Get What You Carpet"	Fred Savage	Peter Murrieta	November 10, 2007	101	4.0
Alex stumbles upon Jerry's old magic carpet and convinces him to give her flying lessons. Having treated Alex as his little girl all her life, he does not want her to grow up and gets impatient while teaching her how to fly. When Alex flies into a building, Jerry gets very mad and says she is not yet ready for lessons. Alex asks Justin to help her, and Justin decides to help her and gives her lessons. Jerry gives Alex another shot at lessons and while they are riding Jerry notices that Alex has improved. Absent: Jennifer Stone as Harper Finkle
7	7	"Alex's Choice"	Bob Berlinger	Matt Goldman	November 16, 2007	109	N/A
Gigi invites Alex and Harper to her annual tea party held at the Hotel Fleur Dubladubladufladufla. Alex tries to convince Harper not to go, because she learns that Gigi plans to embarrass Harper by crowning her the biggest loser with the crown with the pink upper case letter "L." Meanwhile, Justin and Max send out a prank letter in the Wizard Mail, one where they claim they are lost on an island in "The Lava Sea", and they and Theresa, who let them into the lair, get into trouble by emergency wizards. Guest stars: Skyler Samuels as Gigi, Brian Scolaro as Goblin, Michael A. Shepperd as Officer Lamp Absent: David DeLuise as Jerry Russo
8	8	"Curb Your Dragon"	Bob Berlinger	Gigi McCreery & Perry Rein	November 30, 2007	108	N/A
Alex buys Justin an enchanted dragon disguised as a beagle because she feels bad she lost his other dog nine years ago. However, since it can still breathe fire and fly they have to hide from their parents that the dog is a dragon saying it is a lost dog and hanging up posters. One day, while they are at school, the dragon seller comes back, claims the dog and enters it in the local dog show where Alex, Justin, and Max must outsmart the dragon seller and retrieve Dragon. Guest stars: Paulie Litt as Frankie, Taylor Negron as Dragon Seller Absent: Jennifer Stone as Harper Finkle
9	9	"Movies"	Mark Cendrowski	Justin Varava	December 14, 2007	113	N/A
Alex makes friends with one of Justin's friends and tries to get into a horror movie she's too young for with them. Tired of being treated young by her parents and Justin, she accidentally transports herself into the movie, Night of the Halloween Sorority Party Disaster 2, forcing Justin to save her. Meanwhile, Theresa treats Max like a baby when she has trouble accepting that Alex and Justin are growing up. Guest stars: Tiffany Thornton as Susan, Malese Jow as Ruby Donahue Note: Dan Benson, who portrays Zach Rosenblack in this episode, later portrays Zeke Beakerman. Absent: Jennifer Stone as Harper Finkle The episode has been removed from Disney+ in 2025.
10	10	"Pop Me and We Both Go Down"	Bob Berlinger	Vince Cheung & Ben Montanio	January 6, 2008	103	N/A
When Justin gets a big zit on his forehead right before the school dance, Alex tries to get rid of it and accidentally uses an animation spell on it causing Justin to face trouble his zit gets him into at the dance. Meanwhile, Alex searches for her father's trophy as she accidentally animated it and so she can learn the reversal spell to un-animate Justin's zit when she found the trophy. But in the end Justin finds out that Miranda, the girl in his biology class, has a zit as well. Guest stars: Lucy Hale as Miranda, Charlie Bodin as Trophy Man, J.R. May as Bryan, Zone as DJ, Curtis Armstrong as The Zit Absent: Jennifer Stone as Harper Finkle
11	11	"Potion Commotion"	Bob Berlinger	Todd J. Greenwald	February 10, 2008	110	3.4
Justin wants to be chosen for the World School Summit at the U.N., but he faces tough competition from a popular classmate Alex is infatuated with. Alex plans to use a love potion to make him fall in love with her, also helping Justin to sabotage his meeting. Unfortunately, Alex accidentally drinks the entire potion instead of just half and becomes obsessed with herself. After the potion wears off, it seems to have some after-effects; Alex mails herself mass amounts of flowers. Meanwhile, Max's wizard powers begin to develop, and he must wear a goofy hat to control them while his powers settle in. Guest stars: Bill Chott as Mr. Laritate, Shane Lyons as Brad Absent: Jennifer Stone as Harper Finkle
12	12	"Justin's Little Sister"	Andrew Tsao	Eve Weston	March 9, 2008	117	N/A
When Alex gets annoyed that everyone is constantly comparing her to Justin, she makes a wish with a Genie that her family and teachers will stop comparing her to him. Instead, the Genie cons her, causing everyone except Alex to forget who Justin is. Alex messes up her last wish, turning Justin invisible. She explains the situation to Jerry, and Max manages to confuse the Genie, who gives him one free wish, in which he wishes for the reset button. This allows them to reverse all damage done by the Genie. Guest stars: Candace Brown as Genie, Bill Chott as Mr. Laritate
13	13	"Wizard School" (Part 1)	Mark Cendrowski	Vince Cheung & Ben Montanio	April 6, 2008	111	3.7
For Alex and Justin's summer vacation, Jerry and Theresa send them to a wizard school called Wiz Tech, which is presided over by teacher Dr. Evilini. While Justin excels, Alex constantly gets into trouble. But Alex soon uncovers an evil plot to steal Justin's powers. Meanwhile, Max and Jerry camp out on the terrace after Theresa questions their "man-hood". Guest stars: Octavia Spencer as Dr. Evilini, Josh Sussman as Hugh Normous, J. Evan Bonifant as Jerko Phoenix Absent: Jennifer Stone as Harper Finkle
14	14	"Wizard School" (Part 2)	Mark Cendrowski	Gigi McCreery & Perry Rein	April 6, 2008	112	4.6
Alex tries to stop Wiz Tech teacher Dr. Evilini from draining Justin's powers during a school championship tournament of a wizard's table tennis-esque sport called 12 Ball. Justin gets pitted against a boy named Jerko Phoenix, the only one to simultaneously play 11 balls the year before. At the end of the 12 ball tournament, Alex uses a truth spell on Dr. Evilini to get her arrested and to prevent Justin from getting his powers drained. Meanwhile, a woman tries to run the Waverly Sub Station out of business by advertising a restaurant called The Salad Bowl. Guest stars: Octavia Spencer as Dr. Evilini, Josh Sussman as Hugh Normous, Amanda Tepe as Information Desk Lady, J. Evan Bonifant as Jerko Phoenix, Ian Abercrombie as Headmaster Crumbs, Robyn Moran as Salad Bowl Girl Absent: Jennifer Stone as Harper Finkle
15	15	"The Supernatural"	Mark Cendrowski	Matt Goldman	May 18, 2008	115	N/A
Justin uses magic to land a spot on the school's baseball team so he can impress a girl named Kari. Meanwhile, Alex tries to impress Riley by making him think she's the team's good luck charm. After finding out that Justin and Alex were using magic to fix a game, Jerry makes Justin recite a short-term memory loss spell to make everyone, including wizards, forget the last few minutes. Guest stars: Brian Kubach as Riley, Chelsea Staub as Kari Landsdorf, Michael Patrick McGill as Ump Absent: Maria Canals Barrera as Theresa Russo
16	16	"Alex in the Middle"	Bob Berlinger	Matt Goldman	June 15, 2008	106	N/A
Jerry's wizard brother, Kelbo Russo, visits. He shows the kids a different, less conservative style of wizard training from that which Jerry uses (namely, actually letting them use their powers). Finding Kelbo more fun than Jerry, Alex appoints him as her new wizard teacher over her own father, but Kelbo quickly proves to be just as childish and irresponsible with his powers as Alex is with her own, and ends up endangering them both. They are saved by Jerry, who then reveals a secret that he had kept from them: he originally defeated Kelbo in the family-wizard competition, but, as wizards are forbidden to marry mortals, gave his powers up to Kelbo anyway in order to marry Theresa. Guest stars: Jeff Garlin as Uncle Kelbo, Eric Allan Kramer as Coach Gunderson Absent: Jennifer Stone as Harper Finkle
17	17	"Report Card"	Andrew Tsao	Gigi McCreery, Perry Rein & Peter Murrieta	June 29, 2008	118	N/A
Alex, Justin, and Max get their wizard report cards. To hide her failing grade, Alex attempts to destroy her report card numerous times, all of which are unsuccessful. When Jerry and Theresa become suspicious, Alex, in a panic, turns them into guinea pigs. After Professor Crumbs finds out that Alex lied about her parents and her report card, he suspends Alex's powers for irresponsibility. Max and Justin lose the guinea pigs, not realizing who they actually are, and are brought up to speed by Alex. After finding them and changing them back, Professor Crumbs, shocked by how much trouble Alex has caused, decides to permanently strip Alex of her powers, but Justin stands up for her, explaining that cleaning up after Alex makes him a better wizard. Moved by Justin's loyalty to his younger sister, and seeing that Alex has learned her lesson, Crumbs gives Alex back her powers and departs. Guest stars: Ian Abercrombie as Professor Crumbs, Charlie Adler as Report Card
18	18	"Credit Check"	Fred Savage	Todd J. Greenwald	July 6, 2008	121	3.8
Alex's keen fashion sense leads her to begin an internship with a fashion magazine, but her employer takes credit for all of her ideas. She then plans a fashion show with Harper's distasteful clothing style to take revenge on him. Meanwhile, Justin tries to impress a new girl, Millie, working at the Sub Station, but finds out to his dismay that she has a boyfriend. Guest stars: Julia Duffy as Ms. Angela, Jeffrey Christopher Todd as Jeffrey, Sara Paxton as Millie
19	19	"Alex's Spring Fling"	Victor Gonzalez	Matt Goldman	July 20, 2008	119	3.7
Riley dumps Alex because he is becoming tired of the way she constantly acts jealous. She then plans to turn the tables on Riley by making him jealous instead. To do so, Alex animates a mannequin, names him "Manny Kin", and pretends that they are developing a relationship whenever she's in front of Riley. However, Manny genuinely falls in love with Alex, preventing her from being able to change him back to a mannequin. Alex then animates Justin's prized Calico Woman action figure and tries to make Manny fall in love with her. Meanwhile, Justin is left in charge of the house when Jerry and Theresa go out of town, and his position of authority goes to his head. After Justin chases after Alex to retrieve his Calico Woman figure, Manny finally turns back to his original form when he falls in a tank of water during the chaos. Guest stars: Brian Kubach as Riley, Lauren Phillips as Calico Woman, Matt Smith as Manny Absent: Maria Canals Barrera as Theresa Russo, David DeLuise as Jerry Russo
20	20	"Quinceañera"	Andrew Tsao	Gigi McCreery & Perry Rein	August 10, 2008	116	3.8
The family prepares for Alex's quinceañera. Much to Alex's chagrin, Theresa takes control of the plans and turns it into the party that she wants, since she could not afford a quinceañera of her own when she was 15. So Alex switches bodies with Theresa to give her a second chance at having a quinceañera. Also joining in the party is Theresa's mother, Grandma Magdalena, who forgets her responsibility to teach Max and Justin to salsa dance, forcing them to switch bodies with dance instructors Richard and Candace. In the end, after all is resolved, Theresa realizes her error and allows Alex to have the party that she wants. Guest stars: Adam Bay as Richard, Belita Moreno as Magdalena, Gabrielle Dennis as Candace
21	21	"Art Museum Piece"	Victor Gonzalez	Vince Cheung & Ben Montanio	August 31, 2008	120	3.74
When Alex decides to use magic to take a shortcut on her Art History assignment, she brings historical masterpieces to life—namely Mona Lisa, The Blue Boy, Vincent van Gogh's Self-Portrait with Bandaged Ear, and The Scream—in order to answer questions on her worksheet correctly. Meanwhile, Max and Jerry play football in the house using an intangibility spell, which they accidentally spread to Theresa. Guest stars: Julie Brown as Miss Marinovich, Danielle Bisutti as Mona Lisa, Britt Prentice as Babe Ruth
