= Baby Daddy =

American television sitcom (2012–2017)

- Genre: Sitcom
- Created by: Dan Berendsen
- Directed by: Michael Lembeck (Note: The majority of episodes of the series are directed by Lembeck; other than him, Arlene Sanford directed "Take Her Out of the Ballgame" (season 1, episode 6), Robbie Countryman directed "There's Something Fitchy Going On" (season 2, episode 2) and Bob Koherr directed "New Bonnie vs. Old Ben" (season 2, episode 4).)
- Starring: Jean-Luc Bilodeau; Tahj Mowry; Derek Theler; Melissa Peterman; Chelsea Kane
- Composer: Doug DeAngelis
- Country of origin: United States
- Original language: English
- No. of seasons: 6
- No. of episodes: 100 (list of episodes)

Production
- Executive producers: Dan Berendsen; Michael Lembeck; John Ziffren; Vince Cheung; Ben Montanio; Heidi Clements
- Producers: Timothy Marx; Frank Pines; Nancy Cohen; Jan Siegelman; David Hartle
- Production locations: Radford Studio Center; Studio City, Los Angeles; Stage 20
- Camera setup: Multi-camera
- Running time: 22 minutes
- Production company: Don't Borrow Trouble

Original release
- Network: Freeform
- Release: June 20, 2012 – May 22, 2017

Baby Daddy is an American sitcom created by Dan Berendsen that premiered on June 20, 2012, on ABC Family (Freeform). The series follows Ben, a man in his twenties, who gets the surprise of his life when a one-night stand leaves his baby at his doorstep. Ben decides to raise his daughter with the help of his brother, Danny, his two close friends, Riley and Tucker, and his sometimes-overbearing mother, Bonnie. Six seasons were produced in total, with the 100th and final episode airing on May 22, 2017.

== Plot summary ==
Ben Wheeler, a twenty-something bachelor, suddenly becomes a father when his baby daughter Emma is left at his doorstep. With the help of his overbearing mother Bonnie, his older brother Danny, and his two best friends Tucker and Riley, Ben works to turn his life around in order to provide for his daughter.

== Characters ==
=== Main characters ===
- Jean-Luc Bilodeau as Benjamin Bon Jovi "Ben" Wheeler: The lead character of the series. Ben is living the life of a bachelor as a bartender in New York City with his buddy Tucker and his older brother Danny. His life is turned upside down when he opens his apartment door to find a baby girl left at his door by a one-night stand. The baby is his daughter Emma. In season 4, Ben and Danny become owners of the bar. He and Riley, next-door-neighbor and childhood friend of Ben, date briefly twice. The relationship fails because Ben doesn't live up to Riley's expectations. Eventually, it is revealed how strong Danny's feelings are for Riley. Ben initially denies this until Bonnie intervenes and points out that "Danny has loved Riley nearly his whole life" and tries to get the two together. Throughout Season 6, Ben tries to find Elle (Katie Gill), a girl he has fallen for after seeing her three times in the same day during the season 5 finale. In the series finale, Elle is seen looking for Ben throughout the series as well. At the conclusion of the series finale, Elle walks in to deliver Riley's son and Ben immediately recognizes Elle and they end up going out.
- Tahj Mowry as Tucker Thurgood Marshall Dobbs: Ben's best friend and roommate. Tucker is friendly towards everybody as long as they don't eat his food. Tucker has a love-hate and somewhat teasing relationship with Mrs. Wheeler. Ben encourages Tucker to drop out of law school to pursue a career in television. When his father, Marshall Dobbs (Phil Morris), finds out about this he is at first furious and disowns Tucker. Mr. Dobbs later approves of Tucker's career in the same episode. Tucker has multiple relationships throughout the series but ultimately ends up with Sondra, a talkative fellow tenant whose voice is extremely shrill.
- Derek Theler as Daniel Mellencamp "Danny" Wheeler: Ben's older brother, who is a professional hockey player for the New York Rangers. His younger brother looks up to him, and is sometimes envious of Danny being better at everything. It is mentioned many times that Danny is their mother's favorite son, so much that Mrs. Wheeler sometimes says she only has one son. In Season 4, Danny purchases Ben's place of employment, "Bar on B", for Ben. Danny has also been in love with Riley ever since he was six. Danny and Riley eventually end up together in season 5. In the season 5 finale, it is revealed that Riley is pregnant after Danny and Riley become very serious. During Season 6, Danny and Riley get married, and have a son, Puck.
- Melissa Peterman as Bonnie N. Walker (née Prapinski; previously Wheeler): Ben and Danny's mother. She is a happy, outgoing, loud, and dramatic person who has a kind heart. Bonnie loves her kids, though sometime favors Danny more. She dotes on her granddaughter more than anything. It is revealed she got pregnant at 17 and her mother disowned her, resulting in why she bonds with her own children. When her mother visits in the present time, Bonnie finally confronts her and called her a poor excuse of a mother while defending the family she has made and disowns her in return. She loves to drink; her favorite wine is chardonnay. It is hinted many times throughout the series that Bonnie might have a drinking problem. Bonnie has an on and off relationship with Brad Walker from season 3. She later marries Brad in an elevator. She originally wanted to be a model but those plans changed after having Danny. She later becomes a realtor. Bonnie is in love with Bon Jovi, so much so that she named her second son "Benjamin Bon Jovi Wheeler". She describes herself as "a beautiful young woman with goals and ambitions".
- Chelsea Kane as Riley Perrin: Ben's close friend and Danny's best friend since they were little. Although Riley dates Ben on and off during the first few seasons of the show, she falls for Danny towards the end of Season 4, and subsequently begins a relationship with him. During the Season 5 season finale, it is revealed that Riley is pregnant. Danny and Riley get married in Season 6, and she gives birth to their son in the series finale. It is said that she was extremely overweight in high school and, in the season 3 episode "Romancing the Phone," she says she lost 90 pounds. When they were kids, her nickname was "Rigantor," and she could beat up the boys, enjoyed watching professional wrestling with Danny, and played field hockey as well as street hockey. She is highly intelligent. Despite having some difficulty with the LSATs, she does well enough to get accepted into law school. Riley is also extremely competitive. She has liked Ben ever since they were young, but only Danny initially knows. In the episode "Send in the Clowns", it is revealed that her aunt is her real mother. In the episode "House of Cards", she mentions a sister, presumably her cousin in reality, whom she claims to "hate".
- Ali Louise and Susanne Allan Hartman in season 1; Mila and Zoey Beske in season 2; Ember and Harper Husak in season 3; Sura and Kayleigh Harris in seasons 4–6 as Emma Wheeler: Ben's daughter, who is left at his door by a one-night stand. Angela, Emma's mother, and Ben went on with their lives until she realized she was pregnant and gave birth to the child. Deciding that her acting career is more important than raising a child, she leaves Emma at Ben's front door and gives him full custody of Emma.

=== Recurring characters ===
- Bradley "Brad" Walker (Peter Porte): A handsome real estate agent who has an on and off relationship with Bonnie from season 3. He has a twin brother named Tad. On the season 4 episode "Parental Guidance", Brad proposes to Bonnie, with her saying yes. Brad and Bonnie officially get married in season 5.
- Dr. Amy Shaw (Lacey Chabert): A psychologist for the New York Rangers and Danny's girlfriend in season 2. She cares deeply for Danny but is constantly worried his feelings for Riley will drive him away. She eventually realizes Danny still has feelings for Riley and breaks up with him in the episode "Surprise!". In season 3, Amy shows up and announces that she is engaged to another man.
- Fitch Douglas (Matt Dallas): Son of a millionaire and Riley's boyfriend in season 2. Fitch does not speak to his family for he feels their money corrupts them. He constantly travels to Africa to help children and orphanages, having a long-distance relationship with Riley. He is seemingly killed in Africa but later turns up alive at his memorial and proposes to Riley. She regretfully declines claiming she is not the one for him. In season 3, he comes back and Riley attempts to make him her rebound to forget Ben.
- Philip Farlow (Christopher O'Shea): A college professor who Riley briefly dates in season 3.
- Georgie Farlow (Mallory Jansen): Philip's sister who briefly dates Ben, but later develops feelings for Danny in season 3. She is a fashion photographer for Vogue magazine. She doesn't like Riley, but begins to accept her for Danny's sake in the episode "Foos it or Lose It". She breaks up with Danny via voicemail at the beginning of season 4.
- Angela Davidson (Mimi Gianopulos): The mother of Emma and the ex-girlfriend of Ben. When her daughter is 3 months old, she abandons her on Ben's doorstep. She's an aspiring actress who then moves to California. Although she appears in several episodes, Angela never takes the role of Emma's mother as she often places her career first.
- Mary Hart: A fictionalized version of herself, who has a daytime talk show that Tucker is the producer of. While she initially comes off as a kind person on camera, she is very rude and mean off camera, especially towards Tucker. She appears on the show between season 3 to mid-season 5.
- Megan (Grace Phipps): A day care worker who Ben dates in season 2. She breaks up with him after he almost loses her dog.
- Ray Wheeler (Greg Grunberg): Ben and Danny's father. He is divorced from Bonnie and doesn't get along with her. He makes amends with Bonnie by finally telling his family that he's in a relationship with a man named Steve (Robert Gant).
- Sondra (Rachna Khatau): A neighbor who's known for her talkativeness and distinctive high-pitched voice.
- Robyn (Christa B. Allen): Riley's co worker and Danny's girlfriend in season 4.
- Zoey (Jonna Walsh): A single mother living in the same building as Ben, introduced in season 5. She shares the same interests as Ben, but is reluctant to give in to her romantic feelings because of Ben's immaturity.
- Sam Saffe (Daniella Monet): The manager of the Bar on B in season 5. She went to high school with Ben, Danny and Riley. Ben had a crush on her in high school but she never reciprocated his feelings. She and Riley do not like each other, despite frequent attempts on both ends to become friends. Sam briefly dates Ben in season 5.
- Elizabeth "Elle" Ryan (Katie Gill): A woman that Ben has met a few brief times and is convinced is his soulmate. In the season 6 finale, it is revealed that she has been looking for Ben, as he had been looking for her. In the same episode, she and Ben finally meet and end up dating after she is paged to deliver Riley and Danny's son, Puck.
- Carter (Jase Whitaker): Ben's bartender co-worker at the bar Ben eventually ends up owning.

=== Guest stars ===
- Charlotte (Reba McEntire): Bonnie's friend who helps her plan her wedding to Brad. Melissa Peterman starred on Reba alongside McEntire.
- David Brinkerhoff (David DeLuise): Riley's biological father.
- Jennifer Perrin (Caroline Rhea in season 2, Alex Kapp Horner in season 4): Riley's adoptive mother.

== Episodes ==
Season	Episodes	Originally released	
Season	Episodes	First released	Last released
1	10	June 20, 2012	August 29, 2012
2	16	May 29, 2013	December 11, 2013
3	21	January 15, 2014	June 18, 2014
4	22	October 22, 2014	August 5, 2015
5	20	February 3, 2016	August 3, 2016
6	11	March 13, 2017	May 22, 2017

== Broadcast ==
The series premiered in the United States on June 20, 2012, on ABC Family.

In New Zealand, the show premiered on TVNZ's TV2 beginning on December 14, 2013.

In Australia, the series airs on Fox8, with season 1 premiering 29 September 2013, with season 2 returning on 4 May 2014, and season 3 returning on 24 August the same year.

In the United Kingdom, the series began airing on E4 on February 16, 2015. The same year, the second season started on March 2, followed by the third in April and the fourth in September. The fifth season aired on 5 September 2016. The sixth and final season aired in 2017.

In Israel, the series airs weeknights (two episodes each) since July 2016. In South Africa, the series aired on 5 September 2015.

In Italy, the series began airing on Joi Premium, pay channel on the DTT platform Mediaset Premium from 22 February to 22 March 2013. The second, third, fourth and fifth seasons were broadcast on the streaming platform Mediaset Infinity from 2015 to 2016. The sixth season were made entirely available on October 4, 2017, on the streaming platform Mediaset Infinity.

In Brazil the series premiered on September 8, 2014, on the Sony Channel, by TV Globo in December 2017, and on March 5, 2021, the six seasons were made available on the streaming platform Disney+.

In Portugal, the series debuted on AXN White on May 5, 2013, and the last episode was broadcast on July 5, 2017.

=== International versions ===
Country/language	Local title	Channel	Date aired/premiered
Turkey	Bana Baba Dedi	TV8	April 10, 2015
Russia	Папа на вырост	СТС	March 2, 2015

== Reception ==
=== Critical reception ===
On the review aggregator website Rotten Tomatoes, the first season holds an approval rating of 33% based on 12 reviews, with an average rating of 5.10/10. The site's critics consensus reads: "Baby Daddy is moderately well-executed, but it can't quite overcome its stale premise and shortage of laughs". On Metacritic, the first season of the show holds a score 51 out of 100 based on reviews from 8 critics, indicating "mixed or average reviews".

=== Accolades ===
Awards and nominations for Baby Daddy
Year	Award	Category	Nominee(s)	Result	Ref.
2012	Teen Choice Awards	Summer TV Star: Male	Jean-Luc Bilodeau	Nominated	
2012	Teen Choice Awards	Summer TV Star: Female	Chelsea Kane	Nominated	
2013	Teen Choice Awards	Breakout Show	Baby Daddy	Nominated	
2013	Teen Choice Awards	Breakout Star	Derek Theler	Nominated	
2013	Teen Choice Awards	Scene Stealer: Male	Tahj Mowry	Nominated	
2013	Teen Choice Awards	Summer TV Star: Male	Jean-Luc Bilodeau	Nominated	
2013	Teen Choice Awards	Summer TV Star: Female	Chelsea Kane	Nominated	
2014	Teen Choice Awards	Summer Show	Baby Daddy	Nominated	
2014	Teen Choice Awards	Scene Stealer: Male	Tahj Mowry	Nominated	
2014	Teen Choice Awards	Summer TV Star: Male	Jean-Luc Bilodeau	Nominated	
2015	People's Choice Awards	Favourite Cable TV Comedy	Baby Daddy	Nominated	
2015	Teen Choice Awards	Choice Summer TV Series	Baby Daddy	Nominated	
2016	People's Choice Awards	Favourite Cable TV Comedy	Baby Daddy	Nominated	
2016	Teen Choice Awards	Choice TV: Scene Stealer	Tahj Mowry	Nominated	
2016	Teen Choice Awards	Choice TV: Liplock	Chelsea Kane and Derek Theler	Nominated	
2016	Teen Choice Awards	Choice Summer TV Show	Baby Daddy	Nominated	
2016	Teen Choice Awards	Choice Summer TV Star: Male	Jean-Luc Bilodeau	Nominated	
2017	People's Choice Awards	Favorite Cable TV Comedy	Baby Daddy	Won	
2017	Art Directors Guild Awards 2016	Multi-Camera Series	Greg Grande – Baby Daddy	Nominated	
2017	Teen Choice Awards	Choice TV Actor Comedy	Jean-Luc Bilodeau	Won	
2017	Teen Choice Awards	Choice Comedy Series	Baby Daddy	Nominated	
