= Alex Russo =

Fictional character from Wizards of Waverly Place

- Wizards of Waverly Place character
- Selena Gomez as Alex Russo
- First appearance: "Crazy 10-Minute Sale"; Wizards of Waverly Place; October 12, 2007
- Last appearance: "The Last Spell"; Wizards Beyond Waverly Place; August 4, 2026
- Created by: Todd J. Greenwald
- Portrayed by: Selena Gomez

In-universe information
- Full name: Alexandra Margarita Russo
- Nicknames: Lexie, Russo, Moxie Finkle, Mija
- Gender: Female
- Occupation: Waitress (at the Waverly Sub Station and the Late Nite Bite); Tribeca Prep Student (graduated; seasons 1–4); Wizards Delinquent Teacher's Assistant (season 4); Russo Family Wizard and Wizard Tribunal member (series finale onwards)
- Family: Jerry Russo (father); Theresa Russo (mother); Justin Russo (older brother); Max Russo (younger brother); Hank Russo (paternal grandfather); Rose Russo (paternal grandmother); Magdelena Larkin (maternal grandmother); Kelbo Russo (paternal uncle); Megan Brooke Russo (paternal aunt); Ernesto Larkin (maternal uncle); Kim (cousin); Roman Russo (nephew); Milo Russo (nephew); Giada Russo (sister-in-law); Billie (daughter); Damian Pennwolf (husband)
- Significant others: Riley (season 1); Dean Moriarty (season 2); Ronald Longcape, Jr. ("Saving WizTech, Parts 1 & 2"); Mason Greyback (seasons 3–4)

Alexandra "Alex" Margarita Russo is a fictional character and the protagonist of the Disney Channel sitcom Wizards of Waverly Place, portrayed by Selena Gomez.

Selena Gomez is one of only two cast members to appear in every episode of the original series; the other is David Henrie, who plays Justin Russo. The character also appears as a recurring guest in the sequel series Wizards Beyond Waverly Place and in The Suite Life on Deck episode "Double Crossed".

In 2008, AOL ranked her twentieth among the greatest witch characters in television history.

== Fictional character biography ==
Wizards of Waverly Place revolves around Alex Russo and her two brothers, Justin (David Henrie) and Max (Jake T. Austin), three siblings of Italian and Mexican descent who train to become their family's wizard and retain their powers. The siblings reside in Manhattan's Greenwich Village with their parents Jerry (David DeLuise), a former wizard, and Theresa (Maria Canals Barrera), a mortal. According to the episode "Quinceañera", their daughter, Alex Russo was born on August 10, 1993, in taxi cab 804 in New York City. Alex and her brothers attend classes under the tutelage of their father Jerry, from whom they inherited their magical abilities. The siblings tend to grow unfocused at times, especially pertaining to when they discover that their abilities can be applied towards more non-magical uses. Additionally, her family owns and runs a subway-themed sandwich shop, and keep the fact that they are wizards a secret from most people outside of their immediate family. Alex's best friend is Harper Finkle (Jennifer Stone), a mortal to whom Alex reveals that she and her family are wizards after a few seasons. Alex and Harper moved into an apartment together in season 4, located on a secret floor and became the home of Alex and Harper for the remainder of the season. Ultimately, Alex must eventually compete against her brothers to determine who will remain the Russo family's only wizard, as only one wizard is allowed per family. Outside of wizardry, Alex is interested in becoming an artist. At one point, Alex begins dating a werewolf named Mason.

Alex debuts in the pilot episode of Wizards of Waverly Place, "Crazy 10-Minute Sale", asking for permission from her father to attend a sale at a popular clothing store, "Suburban Outfitters" (a parody of the popular clothing brand Urban Outfitters), to upstage her rival since pre-school, Gigi. She cannot attend the sale as she has wizardry class, but decides to clone herself so that she can go to the sale and convince her father that she was at wizardry class. However, this plan falls through when her clone is unable to actually speak, and instead barks like a dog due to a mistake while performing the spell.

Throughout the rest of the first season are similar magical mishaps, most of which are intended to improve things, but typically end up backfiring and causing her to revert them. Alex attends Tribeca Preparatory High School throughout nearly all of the show, a fictional school whose real location is the Salk School of Science. During the first season, Alex also attends WizTech, a fictional wizardry school, once during the summer. Alex is often seen at her family's restaurant, the Waverly Sub Station.

Alex also has a relationship with another student named Riley, which ends quickly after he witnesses her eating large amounts of chocolate, but begins again when she convinces him that she is a good luck charm for their school's baseball team. They finally go on a date during the third to last episode, where Alex shows herself to get jealous too easily, which cause the two to break up. Alex brings life to a mannequin which she pretends to be in a relationship with in order to make Riley jealous, which causes Riley to go back to Alex, only to be replaced with another boy the following season.

The second season continues with a myriad of spells and magic gone awry, the first of which is her joining an academic game at her school called the Quiz Bowl and wearing a pair of pants known as "Smarty Pants" that grant her infinite knowledge. She wears the pants for too long and ends up having skeleton legs, which are fixed towards the end. Another love interest of Alex's, Dean Moriarty, also makes his debut appearance in this episode, as a new student who is forced to help set up the Quiz Bowl.

Alex's infatuation with Dean is revealed to her nemesis, Gigi, after she steals Alex's magical diary and finds that Alex's "knight in shining armor" is Dean. Alex reveals this to everyone, including Dean, in order to avoid giving Gigi any sort of satisfaction from doing it herself. The two confess their love for one another during a race which Dean is involved in, and they begin their relationship.

During their relationship, Alex gets involved with another boy from WizTech, Ronald Longcape Jr., after he is forced to leave WizTech due to a "plastic ball infestation". Ronald, after becoming infatuated with Alex himself, shapeshifts into Dean in order to "end" Alex's relationship with them. This causes Alex to start a relationship with Ronald, as it appears to her as her only option. She agrees to go to WizTech with him, where she realizes that Ronald has kidnapped Dean and put him in a block of jelly. Alex realizes that she truly loves Dean, and leaves Ronald. However, the two break up shortly after, then again in Dean's dream, after Alex uses a spell to get into his head.

In Wizards Beyond Waverly Place, Alex is revealed to be the mother of Justin's young charge, Billie. Due to Billie's evil grandfather, Alex and Justin had erased everyone's memories of the truth. Alex sacrifices herself to save her family and becomes trapped in another dimension, but is later rescued and reunited with her husband Damien and daughter Billie.

== Development ==
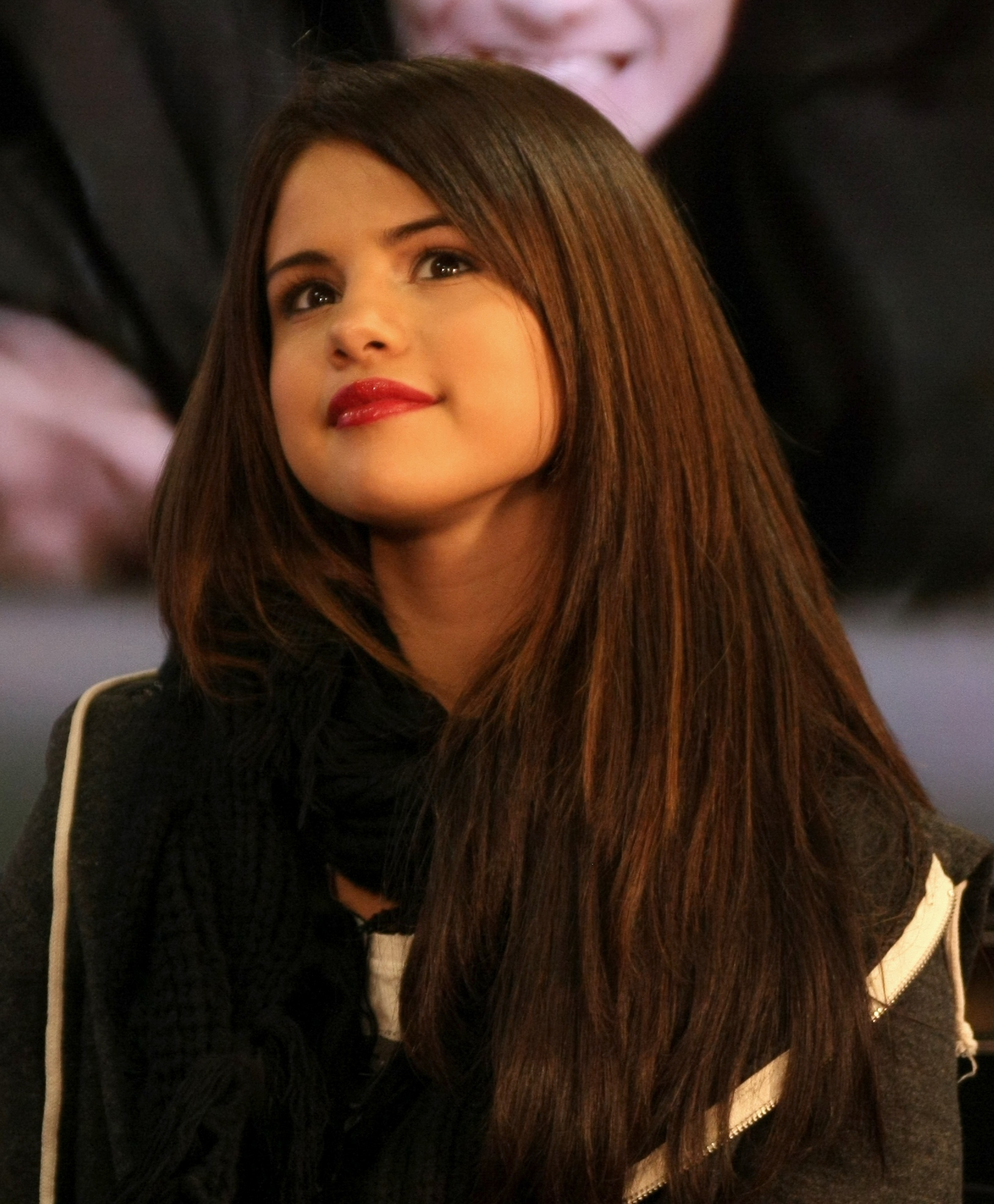
Gomez, pictured in 2010, portrays the protagonist Alex throughout the show's run.

One of the show's several working titles before becoming Wizards of Waverly Place was The Amazing O’Malleys, during which time its main character was originally going to be called Julia, named after creator Todd J. Greenwald's own daughter, and Brooke O'Malley. In the series' un-aired pilot, Julia was one of only two Russo children, alongside her brother Jordan. Julia and Jordan were originally intended to be twin sister and brother until Julia was re-written into the second-born of three Russo siblings. Greenwald explained that Jordan's name was first changed to Justin to avoid confusion with the Nickelodeon show Just Jordan, thus also changing Julia's name to Alex because he felt that it "wouldn’t have been fair [to my son]". Greenwald ensured that each Russo sibling was provided with "their own strengths and weaknesses". Before being cast as the lead character on Wizards of Waverly Place, Gomez had previously worked as a child actor on the preschool series Barney & Friends before being discovered by Disney Channel during a national talent search. Due to this, she had earned recurring, guest star roles on the network's hit sitcoms The Suite Life of Zack & Cody and Hannah Montana as Gwen and Mikayla, respectively. According to AllMusic biographer Matt Collar, these minor television roles eventually "paved the way for Gomez's own show".

Alex was Gomez's first starring screen role. Being of Mexican and Italian descent herself, Gomez shares both of the ethnicities of her character, the only main cast member to hold this distinction. The writers originally kept the results of the series finale secret from the cast until they began filming the episode. Gomez originally felt that Max should be the ultimate winner of the Triwizard Cup instead of her own character. However, the actress was ultimately satisfied with the direction in which the writers ultimately went. Gomez and her on-screen siblings were each allowed to retain their characters' wands after the series' conclusion. In addition to starring in the series, Gomez contributed four original songs to the shows' official soundtrack album, including its theme song "Everything Is Not as It Seems". In addition to reprising her role as Alex in the television film The Wizards Return: Alex vs. Alex (2013), Gomez served as one of its executive producers. Stone described Gomez's approach to executive producing as "not really that different, she has a little bit more say in what happens ... She has a great sense of humor about herself, so we give her tons of crap."

== Characterization and themes ==
John M. Cunningham of Encyclopædia Britannica described Alex as "a mischievous tomboy". Marah Eaken of The A.V. Club described Alex as a "pretty dark" character who is "dry, lazy, and kind of a jerk, sometimes." —describing Alex as "a wisecracking underachiever" keen on using her magical abilities to "smooth the path through high school". Plugged In's Paul Asay identified the character as "a Disney protagonist with a hint of rebellion—Cinderella with a yen for detention", demonstrated by her "slouching, too-cool-for-school vibe." While under a truth spell, the character explains that her attitude is simply "a defense mechanism to hide my desire to really be liked." Alex's personality strongly contrasts with that of her older brother, who unlike her is studious and hardworking.

Although a bit rude to others at times, Alex is shown throughout the show to be a good person at heart. DVDizzy's Kelvin Cedeno writes that, "Alex is a character that could, and should, be off-putting in her narrow-mindedness and egotism. In spite of this, Selena Gomez manages to be likable and approachable in the role."

Alex often uses magic to solve her problems, which frequently ends up causing more problems than she began with. DVDizzy claimed that Alex was "cocky, self-assured, and constantly relies on magic to bail her out of mishaps". Alex underachieves when it comes to high school, however, she excels greatly at art. She is also shown to be only semi-literate, when it is revealed that she has never fully read a book or a menu.

Alex is the middle child and the only female of the Russo children. She often argues with and insults her older brother, Justin, though it is later revealed that she does so because she admires him and wishes to be like him. The fact that her parents seem to favor Justin in most cases also engenders hostility and jealousy toward her brother. Alex and Justin act as foils, as the two are near-polar opposites; Justin is responsible and fair in judgment, though easily insecure at Alex's great magical feats. She feels insecure when seeing Justin accomplish much with his hard work and responsibility. She is shown not to be the most apt student at both "wizarding" and high school, failing her Spanish midterm, her wizardry exam, and relying on the use of magic to pass several assignments. Mary McNamara, writing for the Los Angeles Times, identified that Alex is driven "to become the family wizard, not so much for the power and prestige as the satisfaction of beating out her older brother Justin."

Despite her flaws, Alex has numerous instances of generosity, loyalty, and compassion. She shows deep care for her best friend Harper, even going as far as to reveal to her her wizardry in "Harper Knows" out of guilt for lying. Alex is shown to hate "fake people" and silent films.

== Reception ==
Gomez's performance as Alex garnered strong reviews, including positive comparisons to actress and singer Miley Cyrus, star of Hannah Montana. Plugged In's Paul Asay wrote that Alex "has proven to be a less than ideal role model for her hordes of young Disneyfied fans" as a result of her personality, but concluded that the character "is still pretty good deep down" despite "her posturing". The Los Angeles Times television critic Mary McNamara described Gomez as "sweet and sassy, with a lovely elastic face and great comic timing". Alex is considered to be Gomez's breakout role. According to John M. Cunningham's entry on Gomez in Encyclopædia Britannica, the actress' role as Alex earned her "legions of young fans as [its] winsome star".
