= Person, Place or Thing =

American game show

- Genre: Game show
- Created by: Paul Franklin; Jeff Proctor
- Directed by: Mathieu Besset
- Presented by: Melissa Peterman
- Announcer: Jamie Anderson
- Country of origin: United States
- Original language: English
- No. of seasons: 2
- No. of episodes: 360

Production
- Executive producers: David Hurwitz; Tracy Verna; Paul Franklin; Melissa Peterman; Jeff Proctor
- Production locations: Los Angeles, California; Atlanta, Georgia
- Running time: 20 minutes
- Production company: Dino Bones Productions

Original release
- Network: Syndicated
- Release: September 11, 2023 – May 30, 2025

Person, Place or Thing is an American game show in which three players compete to win cash and prizes by identifying people, places and things. Players gain more information about the subjects by asking questions and receiving clues. Hosted by Melissa Peterman, the series premiered nationally on September 11, 2023 and concluded on May 30, 2025. The show is based on the parlor game twenty questions.

In January 2025, it was announced that Fox First Run had cancelled Person, Place or Thing after two seasons.

== Gameplay ==
Three contestants, one usually a returning champion, compete for the most points after three rounds.

=== Rounds one and two ===
==== Season one ====
In round one, contestants are given a person, a place and a thing to identify. Each contestant asks a yes-or-no question to host Melissa Peterman to get more information on the subject. After each contestant asks a question, Peterman gives a clue to help identify the subject. Contestants wishing to answer may ring in. A correct answer earns the player 100 points, while an incorrect response or running out of time means they may not ask a question in the next series of yes-or-no questions. Play continues until the subject is identified, or three clues have been unsuccessfully responded to. Round two plays similarly, except each correct answer is worth 200 points, and each contestant gets to choose if the subject is a person, place or thing.

==== Season two ====
In its second season, Person, Place or Thing replaced its original first round with a quick-fire multiple-choice round. In round one, Peterman presents a category of person, place or thing and three possible answers. After the host reads a single clue, the first player to signal in with the correct answer before the choices are exhausted earns 50 points. An incorrect guess earns no points and the player cannot respond to the next clue. Nine clues are presented in the round.

Round two plays similarly to season one's second round, except all three subjects—a person, a place and a thing—are identified.

=== Speed round ===
The Speed round is timed at 90 seconds. Clues for a person, place or thing are given quickly by Peterman. Contestants wishing to answer may ring in. A correct answer earns the player 500 points, while an incorrect response means they may not respond until the next subject is revealed. Once a subject is correctly identified, all three players miss, or four clues are unsuccessfully exhausted, a new subject is revealed. Whoever has the most points once time expires is the champion and advances to the bonus round. The losing contestants receive a sponsored consolation gift. A tie results in a sudden death playoff.

=== Bonus round ===
In the bonus round, the champion is tasked with identifying a person, place and thing in 60 seconds. The contestant may ask Peterman yes-or-no questions, or elect to reveal one of three clues. The contestant may identify the subjects in any order, and may use the clues in any quantity they would like. Identifying all three subjects before time expires earns the champion $5,000. If the contestant does not win the bonus round, but identifies at least one subject correctly, they receive a lesser prize. A champion continues to compete until they are defeated. The champion is also playing for an at-home "Super Fan" of the show. If the champion wins the $5,000 cash prize, the "Super Fan" receives $500.

== Production and broadcast history ==
Person, Place or Thing began as a COVID-19 pandemic-era online game show based on the parlor game twenty questions hosted by sports reporter Beto Duran. Created by Jeff Proctor and produced by ProAngle Media, the game focused on sports-related subjects and was played virtually by other figures in the sports community. Episodes were live streamed daily from April 8, 2020 to May 27, 2020. Proctor partnered with Paul Franklin, a former television executive, to develop the show for a wider audience. Franklin knew Melissa Peterman from his time selling repeats of the sitcom Reba, a show on which Peterman co-starred, at 20th Television. After seeing her as a celebrity guest on other game shows, Franklin reached out to Peterman and persuaded her to be part of the show's development, eventually culminating in a pilot presentation.

Fox First Run picked up Person, Place or Thing for a four-week test run in August 2022. 20 episodes were produced and aired on Fox Television Stations. In June 2023, Fox announced that the show had been sold in national syndication. The 180-episode first season, comprising 160 episodes and the 20 test episodes, premiered on September 11, 2023.

In April 2024, Fox First Run announced that Person, Place or Thing was renewed for a second season to premiere in fall 2024. Along with fellow Fox First Run game shows 25 Words or Less and Pictionary, production moved from Los Angeles to Atlanta, where episodes were recorded at the studios of Georgia Public Broadcasting from May to July 2024. Season two premiered on September 9, 2024. A January 2025 TVNewsCheck article reported that Fox First Run would not be renewing Person, Place or Thing for a third season. Its final episode aired on May 30, 2025.

In addition to its first-run syndication outlets, episodes of Person, Place or Thing may be viewed on the show's official YouTube channel and Tubi. Game Show Network aired episodes from October 2, 2023 to September 27, 2024.
