= Melissa Peterman =

American actress (born 1971)

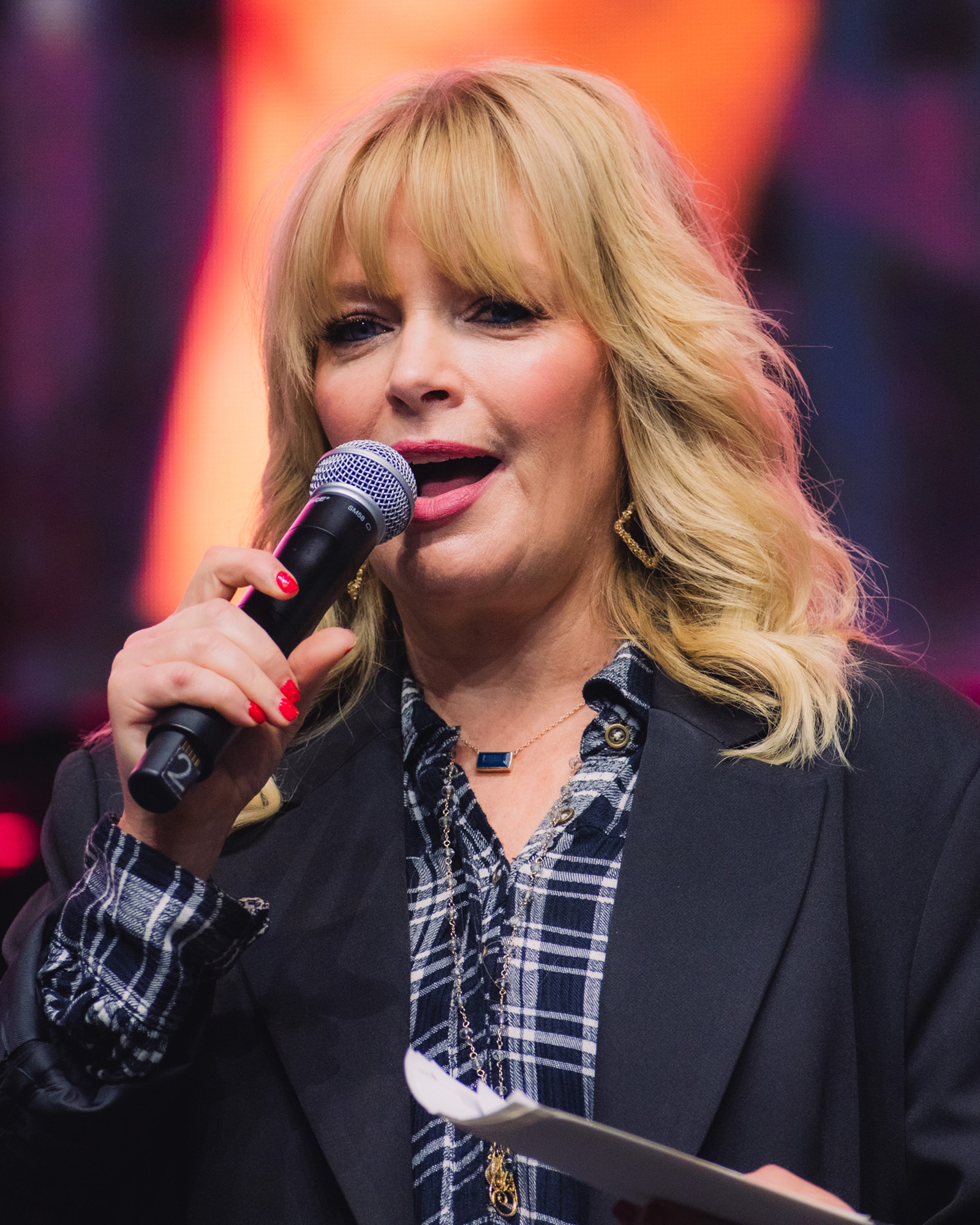
- Peterman in 2025
- Born: July 1, 1971 (age 55)
- Education: Minnesota State University
- Occupations: Actress; television host; comedian
- Years active: 1996–present
- Spouse: John Brady (m. 1999)
- Children: 1

Melissa Peterman (born July 1, 1971) is an American actress, television host and comedian. She has played the role of Barbra Jean in the television comedy series Reba, appeared as Bonnie Wheeler in the ABC Family/Freeform series Baby Daddy, and was host of ABC Family's Dancing Fools, ABC's Bet on Your Baby, and CMT's The Singing Bee. From 2017 to 2024, she played Brenda Sparks in The Big Bang Theory spinoff series Young Sheldon. Since September 2023, she has been the host of the television game show Person, Place or Thing. It was announced she was cast in the Reba McEntire-led sitcom Happy's Place on NBC which premiered on October 18, 2024.

== Career ==
Upon graduating from Minnesota State, Peterman was cast as Madeline Monroe in Hey City Theater's production of Tony n' Tina's Wedding. After more than 600 performances, she went on to write and perform at Brave New Workshop, the improvisational comedy theatre in Minneapolis. The theater boasts such alumni as Pat Proft, Louie Anderson, Cedric Yarbrough, Mo Collins, and Al Franken.

In 1996, Peterman made her film debut as "Hooker #2" in the Oscar-winning Coen brothers' movie Fargo. Just prior to the premiere of Reba, she starred in a commercial for Kia, appearing at a high school reunion where a classmate compares Peterman's own Toyota Corolla with her own Kia Spectra, upon which Peterman brags about having "took Buff Johnson to the prom", only to see her now-overweight prom date stuck in the 1980s with a mullet and driving an AMC Gremlin.

=== 2001–2006: Reba and other appearances ===
In 2001, Peterman was cast as Barbra Jean Booker-Hart in Reba opposite country music star Reba McEntire and television veteran Christopher Rich. The show was the most-watched comedy on The WB in its debut season. In 2007, the show ended its run after six seasons. Episodes continue to air in syndication on multiple networks.

During this time, Peterman also returned to film with Recipe for Disaster alongside Lesley Ann Warren and John Lette. She also made appearances in How High and the unreleased independent film Cook-Off. Peterman remained loyal to her comic roots, too, as the host of 15 Minutes of Fem, a comedy showcase for women presented at the Egyptian Theatre. On television, she appeared in the Oxygen sketch comedy show Running with Scissors and guest-starred on Just Shoot Me! and The Pitts. She also portrayed an unstable guidance counselor, Mrs. Splitz, on Ned's Declassified School Survival Guide.

During her summer hiatus from Reba, Peterman hosted The Sound of Music Sing-a-Long, reprising her hosting gig the previous summer's The Wizard of Oz Sing-a-Long, at the Hollywood Bowl in Los Angeles. Peterman also made appearances on the World Cup Comedy Challenge television series, as well as on the celebrity edition of Trading Spaces, with her Reba co-star Christopher Rich.

=== 2007–2010: Tours, pilots, and The Singing Bee ===
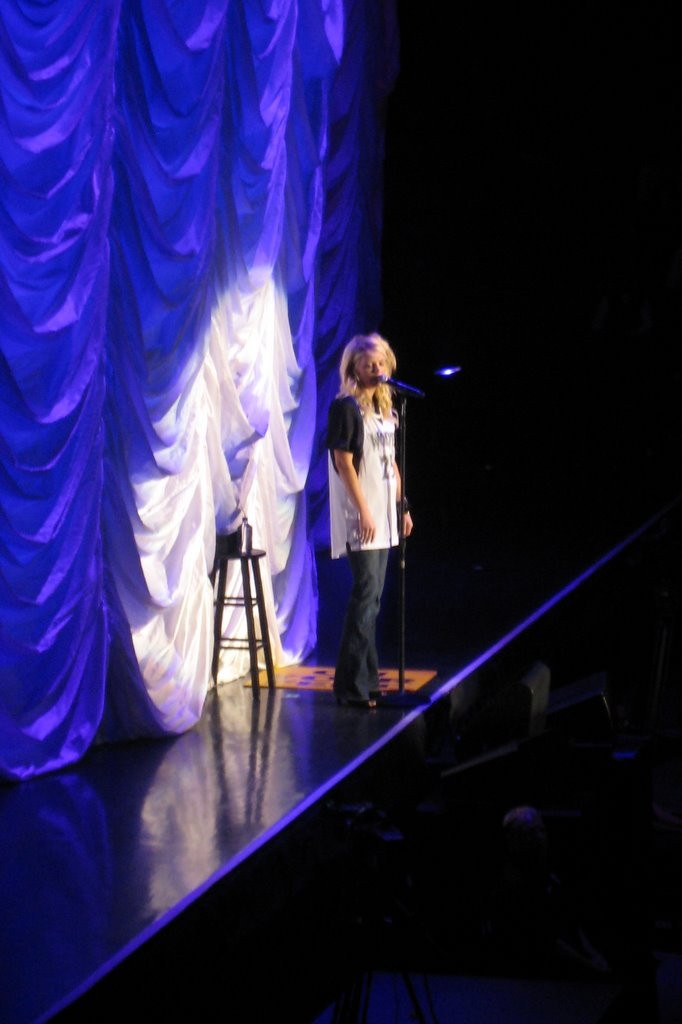
Peterman performing in 2008

In October, ABC announced Peterman had been cast in an untitled comedy pilot starring Cedric the Entertainer. The show was taped before an audience on October 30, 2007. In December, the network announced they had secured the actors, indicating they were interested in the project. During the annual upfront presentation on May 13, 2008, ABC confirmed they did not order the pilot to series.

In 2007, Peterman appeared as the opening act on country singer and former Reba co-star Reba McEntire's tour. Peterman returned the following year when McEntire toured with Kelly Clarkson.

In 2007, Peterman hosted Comedy Stage for CMT. The series finished its run after eight episodes. The next year, she hosted a special, Redneck Dreams, for the network. Also in 2008, she was in two episodes of Wanna Bet? as a celebrity panelist. Peterman also appeared in an episode of animated comedy American Dad!. She announced she was shooting another comedy, this time for FOX, titled Living With Abandon. The pilot was not ordered to series.

In 2009, she landed the hosting gig for The Singing Bee. The show had been cancelled by NBC, and CMT expressed interest in reviving the competition. Also in 2009, Peterman appeared in Rita Rocks on Lifetime, and in Surviving Suburbia on ABC. She starred opposite Gary Valentine in Dusty Peacock, an online comedy series on Crackle.

In February 2010, Big Machine Records announced that they signed Peterman to a recording contract, and she was to release her debut comedy album that year. The album has been recorded, but has not yet been released. Peterman is no longer listed on the record label website. Her debut comedy special, Melissa Peterman: Am I The Only One?, premiered March 12, 2010, on CMT. The special was taped before an audience in Nashville, Tennessee. Also that year, Peterman hosted the CMT Music Awards red carpet.

=== 2011: Working Class ===
Peterman had revealed, in 2010, she was starring in another pilot. The family sitcom, titled Working Class, was the first original scripted comedy for the CMT network. Peterman starred alongside comedy veteran Ed Asner and renowned television actor Patrick Fabian. The series debut was the most-watched and highest-rated in network history. The series was canceled after one season.

=== 2012–present: Baby Daddy, Young Sheldon, and other shows ===
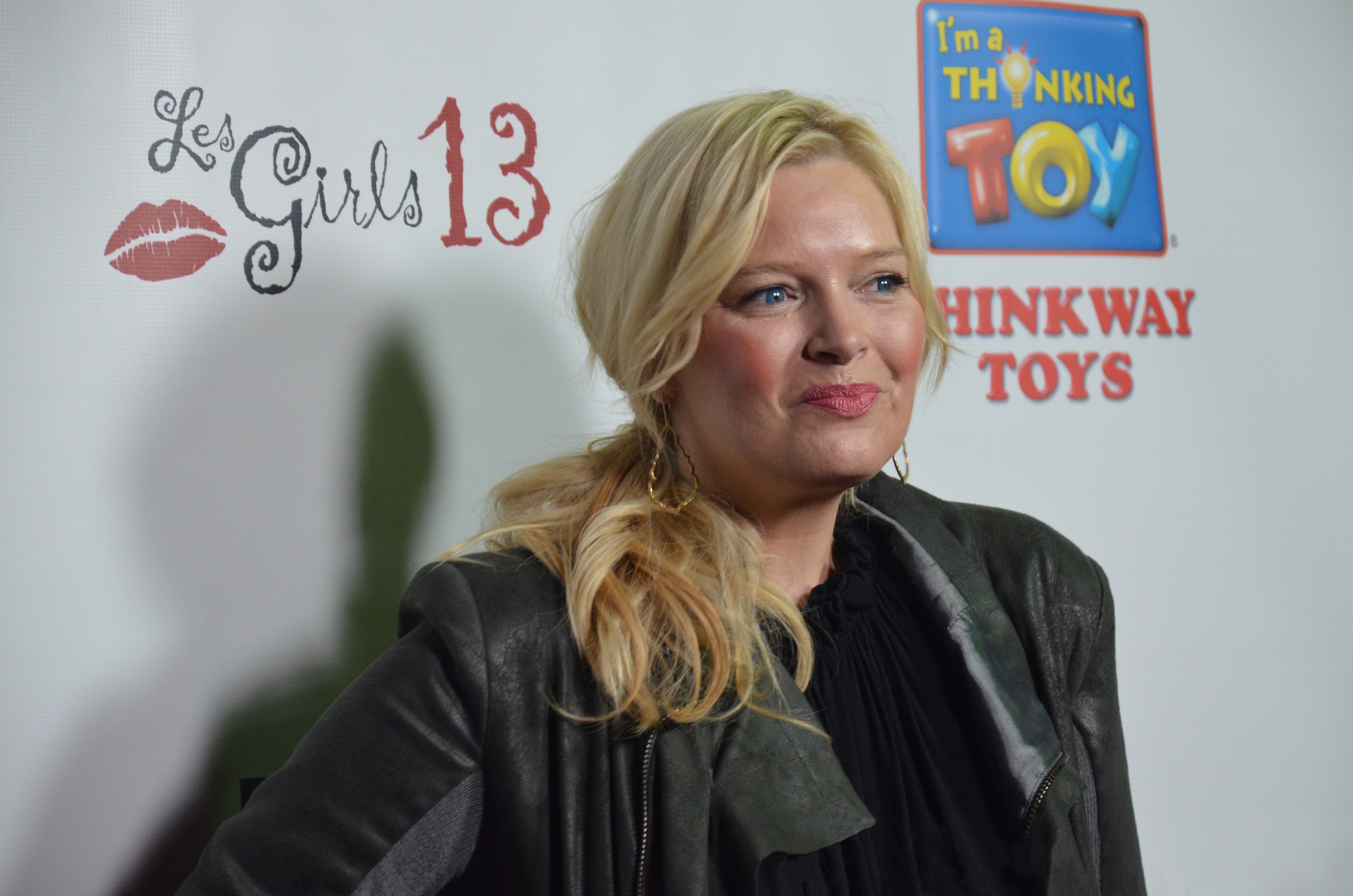
Peterman in 2013

In 2012, Peterman announced she was appearing in an upcoming ABC Family sitcom, Baby Daddy. In March, the network announced Peterman, originally only appearing in one episode, had been upgraded to series regular. The network also revealed the pilot was the highest-testing comedy pilot in network history. Baby Daddy finished its season as the highest-rated comedy in key demographics. The show was renewed for a second season, returning Wednesday, May 29. The show ended on May 22, 2017, after six seasons.

In January 2013, ABC ordered Bet On Your Baby and announced Peterman was the host. The competition series debuted Saturday, April 6. In February 2013, ABC Family announced Peterman was also the host of another upcoming competition, Dancing Fools.

Peterman also guest-starred on Last Man Standing as CeCe in Season 8.

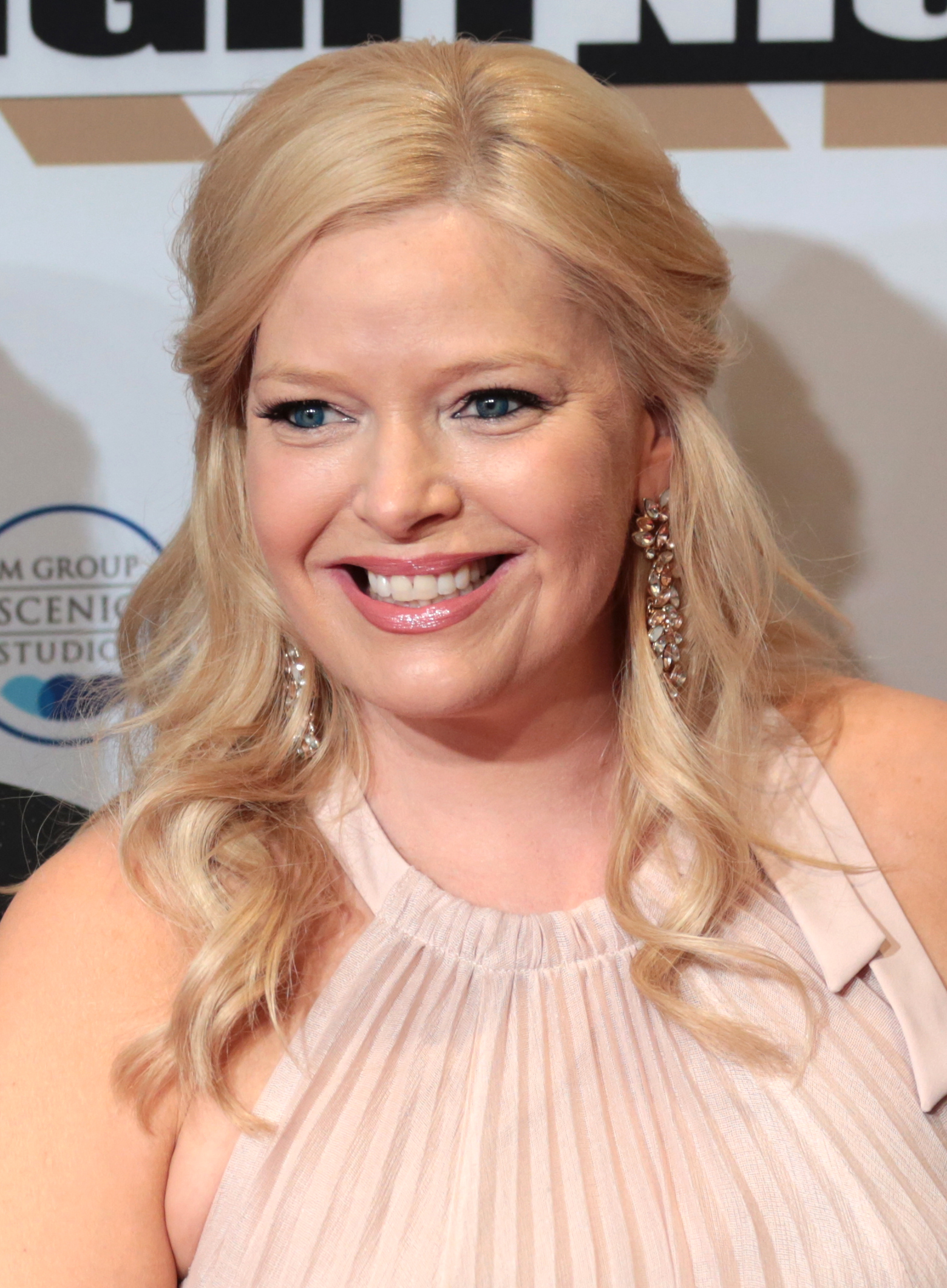
Peterman in 2017

From 2017 to 2024, Peterman played Brenda Sparks, a recurring character on the CBS sitcom, Young Sheldon. Originally married to Herschel Sparks (Billy Gardell) in Seasons 1 and 2, Peterman's character becomes the divorced and single mom next door neighbor to the Cooper family in season 4 and is at times a friend and nemesis to Mary Cooper, played by Zoe Perry. In Seasons 4 and 5, Brenda Sparks and George Cooper (Lance Barber) experience a closer relationship that culminates at the end of season 5 with Brenda propositioning George.

Beginning in 2019, Peterman hosted the comedy game show Punch Line, where two teams of comedians try to supply punchlines to various headlines. She has also been a recurring guest star on the syndicated game show 25 Words or Less, and in 2022, began hosting the game show Person, Place or Thing, a spin-off of the classic game Twenty questions.

In 2020, Peterman began co-hosting with Reba McEntire on a new podcast titled Living & Learning.

In 2024, it was announced that Peterman had been cast in the Reba McEntire-led sitcom, Happy's Place on NBC. It premiered on October 18, 2024. It was recently renewed for a third season. As of 2024, Peterman is also the main judge in a Hallmark reality series Finding Mr. Christmas.

== Personal life ==
Peterman married John Brady in 1999, and they have a son, Riley, born in 2005.

Peterman works with The Unusual Suspects Theatre Company, a nonprofit organization helping at-risk youth in the Los Angeles area.

In 2026, Peterman participated in Big Slick Celebrity Weekend, a fundraiser benefiting Children's Mercy Hospital in Kansas City.

== Filmography ==
=== Film ===
Year	Title	Role	Notes
1996	Fargo	Hooker #2	
2001	How High	Shelia Cain	
2006	Cook-Off	Nancy Shmaedeke	Unreleased
2009	Dirty Politics	Rita Breaux	Unreleased
2012	Here Comes the Boom	Lauren Voss	
2014	Muffin Top: A Love Story	Kim	

=== Television ===
Year	Title	Role	Notes
2000	Just Shoot Me	Claire	Episode "Choosing to Be Super"
2000	Normal, Ohio	Pamela	Unaired footage
2001–2007	Reba	Barbra Jean Hart née Booker	Main role
2003	Recipe For Disaster	Gigi Grant	TV movie
2003	The Pitts	Shirley/Shelly	Episode: "Pilot"
2004	Johnny Bravo	Becky	Episode: "Wilderness Protection Program"
2006	Ned's Declassified School Survival Guide	Mrs. Splitz	Episode: "Guide to Failing and Tutors"
2006	Exploring Space: The Quest for Life	n/a	Associate producer
2007	CMT Comedy Stage	Host	8 episodes
2008	American Dad!	Sister Mary	Episode: "Office Spaceman"
2008	Living with Abandon	Rachelle	TV movie
2008	Untitled Cedric the Entertainer Project	Marci Wittman	TV movie
2009	Rita Rocks	Jennifer	5 episodes
2009	Surviving Suburbia	Mrs. Munice	3 episodes
2009–2012	The Singing Bee	Host	
2010–2012 & 2015	Pretty the Series	Candy	8 episodes
2011	Working Class	Carli Mitchell	Main role; also producer
2012	Retired at 35	Julia	Episode: "The Proposal"
2012–2017	Baby Daddy	Bonnie Wheeler	Main role
2013–2014	Bet on Your Baby	Host	16 episodes
2013	Dancing Fools	Host	8 episodes
2014	Deal with It	Herself	Episode: "Melissa Peterman and Sarah Colonna"
2016	Home & Family	Guest host	
2016–2017	Valerie's Home Cooking	Herself	
2017	Worst Cooks in America: Celebrity Edition	Herself	Contestant
2018–2024	Young Sheldon	Brenda Sparks	Recurring role
2019	A Gingerbread Romance	Linda	TV movie
2019–2020	Sydney to the Max	Mrs. Harris	3 episodes
2019–2020	Last Man Standing	Celia "CeCe" Powers	2 episodes
2023-2025	Person, Place or Thing	Host	
2023	Reba McEntire's The Hammer	Kris	TV movie
2023	Haul Out the Holly: Lit Up	Pamela	TV movie
2024	Finding Mr. Christmas	Herself	Main Judge
2024	The Voice	Herself	Cameo; Blind Auditions: Part 6
2024–present	Happy’s Place	Gabby	Main role
2025	Haul Out the Halloween	Pamela	TV movie
2026	All's Fair in Love and Mahjong	Melissa	TV movie
