= Dan Berendsen =

American producer, and screenwriter

- Born: Daniel Berendsen
- Occupations: Screenwriter, Producer
- Writing career
- Notable works: Hannah Montana: The Movie, Wizards of Waverly Place: The Movie, Camp Rock 2: The Final Jam, Eddie's Million Dollar Cook-Off and Sabrina, the Teenage Witch

Daniel Berendsen is an American producer, and screenwriter, best known as the co-writer of the Disney Channel Original Movie Camp Rock 2: The Final Jam, and the writer of Hannah Montana: The Movie and Wizards of Waverly Place: The Movie. He also was one of the writers, developers and executive producers of Sabrina, the Teenage Witch.

According to the Alloy Entertainment website, Berendsen had written the script for an ABC Family Original Movie in development, based on the book series The Nine Lives of Chloe King. It was later announced that the film had been developed into a TV series that was picked up for 10 episodes and premiered on June 14, 2011. Berendsen is now credited as developer and showrunner/executive producer of the ABC Family sitcom Baby Daddy.

== Works ==
=== Television programs ===
- Baby Daddy (executive producer)
- The Nine Lives of Chloe King (executive producer, developer, writer)
- Sabrina, the Teenage Witch (supervising producer, writer, story editor)
- Tripping the Rift (writer)

=== Films ===
- Hannah Montana: The Movie (2009) (writer)
- Cinderella III: A Twist in Time (2007) (writer)

==== Television films ====
- Camp Rock 2: The Final Jam (2010) (co-writer)
- Wizards of Waverly Place: The Movie (2009) (screenplay, story)
- The Cheetah Girls: One World (2008) (co-writer, co-producer)
- Twitches Too (2007) (writer)
- The Initiation of Sarah (2006) (teleplay)
- The Cutting Edge: Going for the Gold (2006) (writer)
- Twitches (2005) (teleplay)
- The Madam's Family: The Truth About the Canal Street Brothel (2004) (teleplay)
- Halloweentown High (2004) (teleplay, co-producer)
- Pop Rocks (2004) (teleplay)
- Stuck in the Suburbs (2004) (teleplay)
- Eddie's Million Dollar Cook-Off (2003) (story, teleplay, co-producer)
- The Scream Team (2002) (story, teleplay, co-producer)
- Up, Up, and Away (2000) (writer, co-prouder)
- Sabrina Down Under (1999) (writer)
- Sabrina Goes to Rome (1998) (writer)
