= Vince Cheung and Ben Montanio =

Vince Cheung and Ben Montanio are an American television writing and producing team.

== Career ==
Cheung and Montanio first worked together at ITC Productions, where Cheung was a development executive and Montanio worked in production. After doing script rewrites for number of series, the pair began writing as a team in the late 1980s.

They have written and produced for Growing Pains, Night Court, Empty Nest, In the House, The Wayans Bros., The Steve Harvey Show, Between Brothers, Married... with Children, Greetings from Tucson, Ned's Declassified School Survival Guide, American Dragon: Jake Long, Class of 3000, Just Jordan and Wizards of Waverly Place. They also co-wrote the made-for-TV film Wendy Wu: Homecoming Warrior starring Brenda Song.

In 2009, they won a Primetime Emmy for their work on Wizards of Waverly Place.

Cheung is of Chinese descent and Montanio is of Mexican descent. Because of their different ethnic backgrounds, the name of their production company is Rice and Beans Productions.
