= List of Lab Rats characters =

Lab Rats is an American comedy television series created by Chris Peterson and Bryan Moore that aired on Disney XD from February 27, 2012 to February 3, 2016. The series stars Billy Unger, Spencer Boldman, Kelli Berglund, Tyrel Jackson Williams, and Hal Sparks.

== Main ==
=== Chase ===
Chase (Billy Unger) is the team leader of the Lab Rats. He has incredible intelligence and can access a vast database of information at any time. He can take control over his siblings with his override app in emergencies, gaining full control of their bionics, body motions, and dialogue. He also has a magnetism app, allowing him to control magnetic objects. His senses are potent, including extremely sensitive hearing and the ability to see through solid matter. He can also create force fields which can be used as a weapon by shrinking them into his hand before launching them. When growing too nervous or angry, he activates his Commando app, which causes him to glitch and turn into Spike, a second personality who is rude and destructive. Spike has super strength, is almost as strong as Adam, and is skilled in hand-to-hand combat. A second glitch causes Chase to produce a sonic sneeze when his nose is irritated. One of his hidden abilities is molecularkinesis, the ability to manipulate energy around objects to freely move them, which he discovers in "Mission: Space"; in essence, he is telekinetic. When Chase was created, he was referred to as Subject C until Davenport gave him a name. Coincidentally, Billy Unger is skilled in martial arts and hand-to-hand combat, making portraying the role of Chase easy.

In "Bionic Showdown", it is revealed that Douglas is Chase's creator instead of Davenport. In "Brother Battle", Douglas gives Chase a new bionic ability: a bo staff that is also a laser which he can create with his fist. In "First Day of Bionic Academy", along with Adam and Bree, Chase becomes a mentor and trains Krane's ex-soldiers to become heroes. In the series finale, he and Bree take part in Davenport's next experiment, which involves working with superheroes, as seen in Lab Rats: Elite Force.

=== Adam ===
Adam (Spencer Boldman) is the oldest and most powerful of the team, with superhuman strength, making him one of the strongest men on the planet. However he is shown to not be very intelligent. He also has laser vision that can produce focused and intense heat beams. When he gets too happy, he can glitch, causing him to create pulse grenades. His first hidden ability is revealed in "Bionic Showdown", where he generates a powerful force of electricity called a blast wave in order to save Leo from Marcus. When Adam was created, he was referred to as Subject A until Davenport gave him a name.

In "Bionic Showdown", it is revealed that Douglas is Adam's creator instead of Davenport and that Adam has an obsessive love for food. In "Sink or Swim", it is revealed that Adam has the ability to breathe underwater. In "Brother Battle", Douglas gives Adam a new bionic ability: pressurized lung capacity, an extremely powerful wind which he blows from his mouth. In "First Day of Bionic Academy", along with Chase and Bree, Adam becomes a mentor and trains Krane's ex-soldiers to become heroes. In the series finale, he and Leo return to the bionic academy to oversee the other bionic students.

=== Bree ===
Bree (Kelli Berglund) can move at over 400 miles per hour, create a sonic cyclone, jump exceptionally high, and stick to walls and ceilings. Her speed also grants her equally great dexterity, letting her perform feats like typing with just as much speed. One of her hidden abilities is voice manipulation, where she can perfectly replicate any voice or sound she has heard at least once. When she gets too nervous, her voice manipulation ability will cause her to randomly use any of the voices she has heard all at once. She is the only member of the team to ever question how Perry still has her job despite everything she has done. When Bree was created, she was referred to as Subject B until Davenport gave her a name.

In "Bionic Showdown", it is revealed that Douglas is Bree's creator instead of Davenport. In "Brother Battle", Douglas gives Bree a new bionic ability: invisibility. In "Zip It", Chase and Bree get a part-time job at Tech Town. In "Three Minus Bree", Bree destroys her bionic chip after getting frustrated that she cannot go to a concert with Caitlin. After finding out that Chase, Adam, and Davenport almost died on a mission because she was not there to help with her abilities, she realizes that she was being selfish and asks Davenport to make her a new bionic chip. Unfortunately, because Douglas is the one who made the bionic chips, Davenport cannot repair Bree's bionic chip, leaving her with no bionics. When Leo goes to Douglas for help in "Which Father Knows Best?" Davenport and Douglas work together and repair Bree's chip. In "First Day of Bionic Academy", along with Chase and Adam, Bree becomes a mentor and trains Krane's ex-soldiers to become heroes. In the series finale, she and Chase take part in Davenport's next experiment which involves working with superheroes, as seen in Lab Rats: Elite Force.

=== Leo ===
Leo (Tyrel Jackson Williams) is the stepson of Davenport and son of Tasha. He is considered a social outcast, due to his small amount of friends. He accidentally discovers the lab along with Chase, Adam, and Bree after he and his mother move in with Donald Davenport. He finds them, as well as Davenport's inventions, to be incredibly cool and quickly forms a sibling bond with them. Davenport distrusts Leo due to the accidental destruction that he causes.

In "Rats on a Train", it is revealed that his full name is Leo Francis Dooley. In "Missin' the Mission", Leo finally proves himself to Davenport and becomes the team's mission specialist. In "Leo vs. Evil", Leo discovers Marcus' true intentions and later battles him in the exoskeleton in "Bionic Showdown". In "Adam Up", Adam reveals that Leo has a goldfish named Beyoncé. In "No Going Back", he and Davenport are trapped in the lab's elevator after Douglas blows up the lab. In "Sink or Swim", Leo and Davenport are freed from the elevator when Leo switches on the emergency switch. In "You Posted What!?!" Douglas gives Leo bionic abilities after his right arm is badly injured during a fight against Krane and S-1 at Mission Creek High. Leo's bionic arm has super strength and can shoot laser orbs. Krane and S-1 discover this while they are fighting Leo and Douglas. Chase, Adam, Bree, and Davenport are shocked when they figure out that Leo has bionics when he knocks out Krane by blasting him during a fight. Tasha and Perry find out when Leo accidentally grips Perry's hand too tight during a handshake. In "Armed and Dangerous", Leo exposes his bionic arm to Janelle. In "Merry Glitchmas", Leo accidentally exposes his bionic arm to his grandmother. In "Rise of the Secret Soldiers", Leo accidentally exposes his bionic arm in front of an entire mob of angry protesters while trying to get them to leave the house. Additionally, Douglas unlocks a new bionic ability for Leo which allows him to use his bionic arm to absorb energy from any power source. Leo also receives his own mission suit. In "Bionic House Party", Leo transfers most of his energy to Davenport in order to save him, which causes him to turn old and nearly die. The bionic students later save him by transferring their energy to him. In "First Day of Bionic Academy", he becomes a student at the bionic academy and starts at the beginner level. In "Space Elevator", all of the students move up one level, while Leo moves up two levels. He later gets a bionic leg after stopping the crash-landing of Dr. Ryan's space elevator, injuring his leg. In "Lab Rats: On the Edge", he becomes a mentor when he saves everyone, including Douglas, from a collapsing bridge after help from a reformed S-1, who is now known as Taylor, and Logan. In the series finale, he and Adam return to the bionic academy to oversee the other bionic students.

=== Davenport ===
Donald Davenport (Hal Sparks) is the billionaire inventor who is Leo's stepfather and older brother of Douglas. He is the father figure and seemingly the creator of Chase, Adam, and Bree, but it is later revealed that Douglas is the true creator of Chase, Adam and Bree. He usually seems self-centered, childish, and a bit selfish, but he does care about everyone. He can be strict at times, especially about Chase, Adam, and Bree's training or missions. Besides his intelligence, Davenport is very good at martial arts and taught Adam, Bree, and Chase how to use hand-to-hand combat. He seems to be the only one to believe Leo when he says that Marcus is evil.

In "Bionic Showdown", after he, Chase, Adam, and Bree are captured by Douglas, he confesses to them that Douglas is the one who created them, but when he learned about Douglas' evil plan to turn them into dangerous bionic soldiers, he hid them in the lab to protect them. Later, Chase, Adam, and Bree tell Davenport that he is their true father whether or not Douglas is the one who made them. In "No Going Back", Davenport becomes broke because Douglas has escaped and maxed out his credit cards, hacked everything in Davenport Industries, and withdrew all of Davenport's money from the bank. Later, he and Leo are trapped in the lab's elevator after Douglas blows up the lab. In "Sink or Swim", Leo and Davenport are freed from the elevator when Leo switches on the emergency switch. In "The Jet Wing", Davenport does a death-defying stunt in order to raise money to make a new lab. In "Mission: Mission Creek High", Davenport builds a new lab, re-installs Eddy, and becomes rich again when he makes a contract with the government to make a rocket system to protect the Earth from rogue asteroids. In "Rise of the Secret Soldiers", Davenport gets seriously injured after battling Krane, resulting in him going to the hospital and having surgery, and it is unknown if he survives his injuries. Leo later saves his life in "Bionic House Party" by transferring some of his energy into him. In "Unauthorized Mission”, Davenport is injured again by Sebastian while testing out the new mission simulator at the bionic academy. It is later revealed in "Bionic Rebellion" that his injuries are not serious. In "Space Colony", Davenport's newest space colony is nearly destroyed by Krane and Dr. Gao. In the series finale, Davenport begins his next experiment which involves two members from the team working with superheroes, as seen in Lab Rats: Elite Force. However, he has to return to Mission Creek so he can be there when his baby daughter is born.

== Recurring ==
=== Tasha ===
Tasha (Angel Parker) is the mother of Leo, the wife of Davenport, and a TV reporter. She also acts as a mother figure for Chase, Adam, and Bree, but bonds more with Bree because she is the only girl in the house. In the series finale, she reveals that she is pregnant with a baby girl, something that Bree has always wanted.

=== Eddy ===
Eddy (voiced by Will Forte) is the six-year-old smart home system created by Davenport who controls the Davenport house. Eddy hates Chase, Adam, Bree, and Tasha, but is frenemies with Leo and loves Davenport. He believes Tasha is hideously unattractive.

In "No Going Back", Douglas blows up the lab, and it is later confirmed that Eddy has been destroyed, much to Tasha's delight. In "Mission: Mission Creek High", Eddy makes his return when Davenport rebuilds the lab and recreates him, much to the dismay of the others. In "Three Minus Bree", Eddy takes over Tasha's body when Leo's latest invention to try to make Tasha, who is sick, feel better goes awry. In "Human Eddy", Eddy shows up in the bionic academy's systems, where he states that he had been trying to get to island for months and has trapped Tasha in the closet. Davenport creates a synthetic body for Eddy, with an altered personality to help Perry with her security job. With Eddy's new personality starting to annoy Perry, Perry uses one of Davenport's passwords to restore Eddy's old personality. Afterward, Eddy starts to get payback on Leo and Bree by trapping them in a wall. Then Eddy starts hanging out with Davenport as Leo and Bree arrive to tell him what Eddy has done, only to find out that Eddy has doctored the security footage. To get even with Eddy, Leo and Bree tell Perry that Eddy might have her replaced with someone else. This causes Perry to make plans to keep Eddy from taking her job, and Perry confronts Eddy and fights him when he calls her a gnome; however, due to his body being synthetic, Eddy cannot feel pain. Chase, Adam, Bree, and Leo learn that Perry has reprogrammed him and Leo manages to kick Eddy with his bionic leg just as Davenport arrives upon being beard-dialed by Eddy. Davenport then struggles with Eddy and is accidentally thrown into a wall. Perry then destroys Eddy's synthetic body with a laser. Later, Davenport recreates Eddy and puts him back into the bionic academy's systems.

=== Principal Perry ===
Principal Perry / Perry (Maile Flanagan) is the principal of Mission Creek High. It is never revealed why, but she dislikes Leo the most and is frenemies with him. Ever since the events of "Mission Invisible", she has been suspicious of the team's secret.

In "Chip Switch", her full name is revealed to be Theresa "Terry" Cherry Perry. In "My Little Brother", her mother is introduced and reveals that Terry is short for Theresa. In "No Going Back", she finally discovers Chase, Adam, and Bree's bionics. Despite wanting to turn them in, she blackmails Davenport to bribe her to keep her quiet; however, due to Douglas making him go broke, she leaves, but promises Davenport and Tasha that it is not over. In "Sink or Swim", she helps Leo, Davenport, and Tasha by letting them stay at the school so she can get her money sooner. In "You Posted What!?!" it is revealed that she and Douglas have some form of relationship that Douglas does not want to talk about. In "Face-Off", while Principal Perry is sick at home, Bree impersonates her using a cyber cloak to get revenge on Adam, and it is revealed that Principal Perry has a twin sister who has been missing for 11 years. In "Unauthorized Mission", she quits her job and manipulates Davenport so that he will let her work as the chief of security at the bionic academy. In "Bionic Rebellion", Perry tries to warn everyone about Sebastian stealing the explosives, but no one believes her. After Sebastian, Lexi, and Tank are defeated, Perry has them locked up.

=== Trent ===
Trent (Eddie Perino) is the bully and jock of Mission Creek High, who has an ongoing feud with Chase, Adam, Bree, and Leo. He has competed against Chase, Adam, Bree, and Leo in football and basketball and somehow always seems to come out with the short end of the stick. In "Trent Gets Schooled", he graduates thanks to the help of Chase and Leo; however, much to their shock, Perry hires him as the gym teacher.

=== Janelle ===
Janelle (Madison Pettis) is Leo's girlfriend, who is very smart and controlling. In "Can I Borrow the Helicopter?" Leo mentions that she also likes comics. In "Back from the Future", Future Leo reveals that he marries Janelle in the future, but when Leo skips his date with her to go save Chase, Adam, and Bree, Future Leo ends up living alone with a dog. In "Air Leo", it is revealed that she likes basketball. In "Avalanche!" Janelle returns, where Leo accidentally freezes her and Tasha with one of Davenport's inventions. In "Prank You Very Much", Leo's grandmother disapproves of Janelle. In "Mission: Mission Creek High", Janelle believes Leo is bad luck because she always gets hurt when they are together. In "Scramble the Orbs", she no longer sees Leo as a jinx or bad luck, so she invites him to her play; however, Trent steals Leo's ticket and Leo and Trent ruin her play.

=== Caitlin ===
Caitlin (Michaela Carrozzo) is Bree's best friend. Initially a good friend of Bree's, she later becomes less friendly with her as the show goes on, often taking advantage of her or just plain putting her down. In "Robot Fight Club", it is revealed that she wears glasses and also has a crush on Adam, but later develops a crush on Chase. In "Zip It", she gets a part-time job at Tech Town and makes Bree do all her work. In "Not So Smart Phone", she is fired from Tech Town after she has an emotional breakdown and destroys an ePhone 7.

=== Marcus ===
Marcus (Mateus Ward) is an android with all of Chase, Adam, and Bree's abilities and is Leo's arch-enemy. Marcus originally comes off as friendly and considerate, but it is all an act to lower suspicion of him and gain the others' trust. In "Mission: Space", he installs a hidden spy camera in Davenport's lab. In "Speed Trapped", Marcus reveals to Leo that he is also bionic and threatens to reveal Chase, Adam, and Bree's secret if he tells anyone the truth about him. In "Leo vs. Evil", it is revealed that Marcus has an evil lair right under his house and is also working for his father. In "Bionic Showdown", it is revealed that he is an android with all of Chase, Adam, and Bree's abilities combined and augmented. He was created by Douglas to capture Chase, Adam, and Bree. It is also revealed that Douglas is Chase, Adam, and Bree's true creator. Later, Marcus appears to be crushed and defeated. In "Bionic Action Hero", Giselle manages to track down Marcus' body, hinting at his return. In "The Vanishing Part 1" and "The Vanishing Part 2", Marcus is revealed to have been rebuilt by Giselle and battles Chase, Adam, Bree, Leo, Davenport, Douglas, and Daniel, before being defeated and destroyed by Daniel. When Leo later throws his parts on the floor at the lab out of frustration for everything that he has done, he automatically reassembles and attempts to battle Leo, before being blasted and destroyed by Douglas.

=== Douglas Davenport ===
Douglas Davenport / Douglas (Jeremy Kent Jackson) is the creator of Chase, Adam, Bree, and Marcus, step-uncle of Leo, and younger brother of Donald Davenport, as revealed in "Bionic Showdown". He first appears in "Leo vs. Evil", where he is planning to capture Chase, Adam, Bree and ruin Davenport. He is credited as Shadowy Figure. Douglas returns in "Avalanche!" where he reveals that he is just like Chase, underappreciated by his sibling. Although he tries to manipulate Chase into betraying the others, Chase double-crosses Douglas and freezes him, stating that he would never betray his own family. Davenport then has him sent to one of his facilities to be imprisoned.

In "No Going Back", Douglas is freed by a mysterious masked man; after he is freed, he contacts Davenport and tells him that he is the one who has maxed out his credit cards, hacked everything in Davenport Industries, and drained all of his money out of the bank. He also states that he is going after Chase, Adam, and Bree and blows up the lab, with Leo and Davenport trapped in the lab's elevator. In "Sink or Swim", Douglas impersonates Davenport and captures Chase, Adam, and Bree. It is later revealed that Douglas is working with billionaire Krane, who wants Chase, Adam, and Bree destroyed, much to Douglas's shock. In "Taken", Douglas saves Chase, Adam, and Bree from Krane; however, Davenport still does not trust him. After Bree destroys her bionic chip in "Three Minus Bree" and Davenport's attempts at rebuilding it fails, Leo goes to Douglas for help in "Which Father Knows Best?". With the help of Davenport, Bree's bionic chip is repaired. Still not trusting Douglas, however, Davenport kicks him out. Realizing that everyone deserves a second chance, Davenport later allows Douglas to stay with the family for a while. In "You Posted What!?!" still living with the Davenports, it is revealed that he and Principal Perry have some form of relationship that Douglas does not want to talk about. Douglas also gives Leo a bionic arm after his arm is badly injured by S-1. In "Armed and Dangerous", Douglas starts training Leo on how to use his bionic arm more responsibly. After Davenport builds Davenport Bionic Academy, Douglas becomes a part of the bionic academy's R&D and is often put in charge whenever Davenport is out. In "And Then They Were Four", Douglas reveals that he created a fourth bionic child named Daniel, who he did not tell was bionic. After Daniel's bionics are accidentally activated by Chase, Adam, Bree, and Leo and Davenport and Douglas find out, Douglas comes clean to Daniel and tells him that he has power-replicating abilities. After Adam and Daniel stop the leak of the hydroloop's fuel tank, Douglas apologizes to Daniel for lying about his bionics out of fear that he would freak out, and Daniel decides to give Douglas a second chance. Before Daniel leaves to go back to the mainland, Douglas tells him that he can come back anytime.

=== Krane ===
Victor Krane (Graham Shiels) is a billionaire who sports his own bionics, which include super strength, super speed, expert fighting abilities, genius-level intellect, pyrokinesis, electrokinesis, molecular kinesis, energy absorption, geo-leaping, super jumping, enhanced durability, sonic screaming, and the Triton app. He works for and invests $80,000,000 in Douglas.

In "No Going Back", he breaks into the offshore facility to break Douglas out. In "Sink or Swim", he overthrows Douglas and forms his plan after Douglas fails to control Chase, Adam, and Bree through the Triton app. In "Taken", he plans to destroy Chase, Adam, and Bree because they are a threat to him by kidnapping Leo and Tasha and using them as bait. In "You Posted What!?!" it is shown that Krane has an entire army of bionic soldiers, with the only one identified being S-1. Krane and S-1 are defeated by Chase, Adam, Bree, and Leo and arrested by the government. They are seen trapped in an electric cage; however, Krane is still able to awaken his other bionic experiments that are on the other side of the world. In "Rise of the Secret Soldiers", Krane and S-1 are freed by Krane's bionic soldiers and he plans to use the Triton app to control the world, which he demonstrates on the president. Krane is finally defeated when he is sent flying into the air by Chase, Adam, and Bree when they all combine their abilities to disable the Triton app, which causes the remaining bionic soldiers to lose their memory and end up being trained at Davenport Bionic Academy. In "Bionic Dog", it is revealed that Krane had taken Otis, Douglas dog who he implanted with bionics, and put him under the Triton app and gives him the mission of destroying Douglas. Chase and Douglas later successfully remove Otis' bionic chip. In "One of Us", it is discovered that Krane had installed a doomsday virus in the Triton app, which would cause the bionic soldiers to self-destruct to prevent anyone else from controlling them in case he dies. In "Space Colony", it is revealed that Krane had survived his last battle with everyone, but suffered severe injuries. He collaborates with Dr. Gao to destroy Davenport's space colony. Krane later dies when a missile destroys his attacking space pod.

=== S-1 / Taylor ===
Taylor (Ashley Argota), formerly known as S-1, is one of the first bionic soldiers to be made by Krane. She is bionic and fights beside Krane. She can set her body temperature to adapt to her surroundings and possesses super strength, super speed, molecular kinesis, energy generation, and enhanced martial arts abilities. S-1 also appears to like Chase, much to Bree's shock. During Krane and S-1's fight with the team, S-1 takes on Bree in a speed-fighting match and loses after Krane is subdued. Both of them are arrested by the government and placed in an electric cage. She seems to have taken Marcus' place as Leo's arch-enemy until "One of Us", where she and Leo make a fresh start after a bionic virus left by Krane is stopped.

In "Rise of the Secret Soldiers", Krane and S-1 are freed by Krane's bionic soldiers as they plan to use the Triton app to control the world. S-1 takes on Leo in a battle and is sent flying far from the junkyard by him. In "Lab Rats: On the Edge", she becomes blind after an accident with Leo's laser sphere.

=== President ===
President (John Eric Bentley) is the fictional president of the United States. He becomes aware of Chase, Adam, and Bree after their activity is leaked on the Internet in "You Posted What!?!". He approves the Davenport Bionic Academy after he sees the bionic soldiers save Leo in "Bionic House Party". A running gag is that he thinks Leo is somewhat useless since he always laughs when Leo tries to show off and calls him funny.

=== S-3 / Sebastian ===
Sebastian (Cole Ewing), formerly known as S-3, is one of the bionic soldiers who works for Krane. Sebastian's bionic abilities include super intelligence, super senses, use of laser pitchforks, geo-leaping, energy generation, energy transference, molecular kinesis, electrokinesis, pyrokinesis, and heat vision. In "Rise of the Secret Soldiers", he takes on Chase and is defeated by him. Following Krane's defeat and the disabling of the Triton app, Sebastian is among the remaining bionic soldiers that are taken in by Davenport and enlisted at Davenport Bionic Academy. In "First Day at Bionic Academy", he develops a rivalry with Chase and a crush on Bree. In "Unauthorized Mission", he develops a friendship with Chase; however, he later turns evil after Chase tells him about Krane being his creator and what happened to him. In "Bionic Rebellion", Sebastian begins his plans for revenge against everyone, with the help of Lexi and Tank, fellow bionic soldiers, while using the knowledge he has learned from Chase to unlock several new abilities. After the team tricks Sebastian into overloading his bionic chip, which is later removed, Sebastian is imprisoned by Perry, alongside Lexi and Tank.

=== Spin ===
Spin (Max Charles) is a young bionic child who has taken up the name Spin because he can spin very fast in a tornado-like matter. At Davenport Bionic Academy, Spin develops a rivalry with Leo. In "Unauthorized Mission", he and Leo become friends after Leo saves him and Bob from quicksand. In "Bionic Rebellion", Spin and Bob help Leo escape from the other bionic students. Still, his level is later demoted back to a beginner as discipline for his actions in "Unauthorized Mission". In "Space Elevator", all of the students move up one level, and Spin is now intermediate.

=== Bob ===
Bob (Brandon Salgado-Telis) is a bionic soldier. His bionic abilities include super strength and levitation. Whenever Bob sees Bree, he tries to impress her or use pick-up lines. Adam is the one who came up with his name. In "First Day at Bionic Academy", Adam becomes his mentor. In "Forbidden Hero", Bob becomes attracted to Caitlin and starts hanging around her, causing Bree to become jealous. However, Bob later reveals that he is not attracted to Caitlin and he was only using her to see if Bree likes him. In "Space Elevator", he almost fails the first semester, but Perry helps him become tough and he moves up one level like everyone else and is now intermediate.

== Notable guest stars ==
=== Kavan ===
Kavan (Cody Christian) appears in "Crush, Chop, and Burn".

=== Grandma Rose / Dooley ===
Grandma Rose (Telma Hopkins), credited as Grandma Dooley in "Prank You Very Much", is Leo's grandmother and Tasha's mother. She seems to protect and love Leo more than she does Tasha. She dislikes Davenport and Janelle; when Davenport injures her, he has to take care of her as a command from Tasha, but he makes her a mechanical wheelchair instead. Janelle is shown to dislike her as well as she tries to get rid of her when she wants to spend time with Leo.

=== Future Leo ===
Future Leo (Tyler James Williams) appears in "Back from the Future".

=== Agent Gordon ===
Agent Gordon (Tim Russ) appears in "Parallel Universe".

=== Joey Logano ===
Joey Logano appears as himself in "The Bionic 500".

=== Dr. Evans ===
Dr. Evans (Noah Wyle) appears in " 'Twas the Mission Before Christmas".

=== Scott ===
Scott (Dustin Ingram) is the manager of Tech Town, who likes Chase and hates Bree and Caitlin. In "Not So Smart Phone", he fires Caitlin after she has an emotional breakdown and breaks a new iPhone 7. He is a goofy and obnoxious boss who likes technology, which is shown in "Scramble the Orbs" when he gives a $500 Tech Town gift card to an app contest winner.

=== Andre Ethier ===
Andre Ethier appears as himself in "Alien Gladiators".

=== Simon ===
Simon (Karan Brar) appears in "Alien Gladiators".

=== Tecton ===
Tecton (Jilon VanOver) appears in "Lab Rats vs. Mighty Med".

=== Incapacitator ===
Incapacitation (Damion Poitier) appears in "Lab Rats vs. Mighty Med".

=== Horace ===
Horace (Carlos Lacámara) appears in "Lab Rats vs. Mighty Med".

=== Troy West ===
Troy West (Leo Howard) is an android with bionics who was created by Giselle, Douglas's ex-girlfriend, to act as an action film star. In "Bionic Action Hero", he appears at the bionic academy with Giselle for a movie with Chase, Adam, Bree, Leo, and Douglas. However, Bree discovers that the movie is just a cover and Troy and Giselle want to use Chase's bionic chip so that Giselle can implement her android army with his intelligence. Troy is later ultimately defeated by Bree when she exposes him to water.

=== Giselle ===
Giselle (Jessalyn Wanlim) is a scientist and film director, who is a former colleague and girlfriend of Douglas and is known for creating androids. She first appears in "Bionic Action Hero", where she wants to make a movie about Chase, Adam, Bree, Leo, and Douglas as a cover for her and Troy West to steal Chase's bionic chip to improve her android army with his intelligence. After Troy and his rebels are defeated, she manages to locate Marcus' body as part of her plans to improve her androids. In "The Vanishing Part 1" and "The Vanishing Part 2", Giselle returns with Marcus, finally ready to execute her plan of destroying all bionic humans, and successfully destroys all of the bionic chips, except for Daniel's. However, Chase, Adam, Bree, and Leo fight back and Giselle is defeated when she accidentally wraps her electric whip around herself.

=== Logan ===
Logan (Emery Kelly) appears in "Lab Rats: On the Edge".

=== Willie McGinest ===
Willie McGinest (Willie McGinest) appears in "Ultimate Tailgate Challenge".

=== Daniel ===
Daniel (Pearce Joza) is the younger bionic brother of Chase, Adam, and Bree and is the step-brother of Leo. He has been living a normal life with an adopted family and never knew that he had bionics until his siblings accidentally activate his chip while taking a group photo. It is revealed by Douglas that Daniel has an ability called power replication, in which he can touch someone and obtain whatever ability they have; however, when he touches another person, the old ability is replaced with the new one. After Adam and Daniel stop the leak of the hydro loop fuel tank, Douglas apologizes to Daniel for lying about his bionics out of fear that he would freak out, and Daniel decides to give Douglas a second chance. Before Daniel leaves to go back to the mainland, Douglas tells him that he can come back anytime. His original name is Subject D as he is the fourth bionic human that Douglas created.

=== Dr. Gao ===
Dr. Gao (Ping Wu) appears in "Space Colony".

== See also ==
- List of Lab Rats episodes

== General references ==
- The episodes of Lab Rats that have aired are the source of most of the information in this article.
