= List of Lab Rats episodes =

Lab Rats is an American comedy television series created by Chris Peterson and Bryan Moore that aired on Disney XD from February 27, 2012 to February 3, 2016. The series stars Billy Unger, Spencer Boldman, Kelli Berglund, Tyrel Jackson Williams, and Hal Sparks.

== Series overview ==
Season	Episodes	Originally released	
Season	Episodes	First released	Last released
1	19	February 27, 2012	November 5, 2012
2	25	February 25, 2013	January 13, 2014
3	23	February 17, 2014	February 5, 2015
4	22	March 18, 2015	February 3, 2016

== Episodes ==
=== Season 1 (2012) ===
No. overall	No. in season	Title	Directed by	Written by	Original release date	Prod. code	U.S. viewers (millions)
1	1	"Crush, Chop, and Burn"	Victor Gonzalez	Chris Peterson & Bryan Moore	February 27, 2012	101–102	1.27
In the fictional town of Mission Creek, Leo and his mother, Tasha, move in with billionaire inventor Donald Davenport, Leo's step-father. In a secret underground lab in Davenport's high-tech home, Leo discovers three bionic superhuman teenagers named Chase, Adam, and Bree, known as the Lab Rats. Leo learns they have lived their whole lives in the lab, where they have been training their bionic abilities for future classified missions. Leo secretly takes them to his school, Mission Creek High, where their lack of experience with the outside world causes chaos, in part because their bionics can be inadvertently activated through their emotions. When Davenport finds out, he bans Chase, Adam, and Bree from having contact with the outside world. However, Leo, in appreciation for making him more popular at school, throws a party for Chase, Adam, and Bree in Davenport's house, only to get caught when Davenport and Tasha return home during the festivities. After disobeying his orders, Davenport decides it is best to send Chase, Adam, and Bree to his top secret facility in the Arctic to finish their bionic training. Davenport creates robot versions of them to hang out with Leo, but the real Lab Rats switch places with their replacements. However, Tasha decides that she does not want Leo to hang out with robots and tells Davenport to recycle them, not knowing they were the real children. Once at the recycling plant, Chase, Adam, and Bree use their bionics to avoid various hazards, but must backtrack when Leo arrives to rescue them. Davenport and Tasha learn of the mix-up and arrive at the plant. After seeing the children risk their lives for each other, Davenport decides to let them stay at home to complete their training. He also agrees to let them attend school, as long as they maintain their bionic secret and control their emotions to prevent further glitches. Guest stars: Angel Parker as Tasha, Cody Christian as Kavan, Will Forte as the voice of Eddy Note: This is a double-length special episode.
2	2	"Commando App"	Victor Gonzalez	Gigi McCreery & Perry Rein	March 5, 2012	103	1.16
Chase, Adam, and Bree attend their first day at Leo's school, despite Davenport's concerns about Chase's dangerous "Commando App", which activates in response to a threat and transforms him into Spike, a fearless and quick-tempered individual with increased physical strength. Adam, Bree and Leo promise Davenport they will keep Chase out of trouble, but his Commando App is triggered when he encounters Trent, an unfriendly player on the school football team. As Spike, Chase defends himself against the football team, which is upset that he is sitting at their "cool table" in the cafeteria. Following the confrontation with Spike, the football team is forced to sit at a different table and subsequently loses motivation to win an upcoming game, so Principal Perry attempts to retrieve the table for them. Spike, Adam, Bree, and Leo agree to play against the team in a football game, with the winning team being allowed to keep the table for themselves. Spike and his team nearly win the game, until he reverts to Chase near the end. Meanwhile, Davenport is irritated by interruptions from Eddy, his smart home security system which has its own personality. Guest stars: Maile Flanagan as Principal Perry, Eddie Perino as Trent, Will Forte as the voice of Eddy
3	3	"Leo's Jam"	Victor Gonzalez	Heather Flanders	March 12, 2012	105	1.05
Leo likes a school student named Danielle, but is unsuccessful in asking her to an upcoming school dance. When Chase learns that Danielle wants to go with someone heroic, he devises a plan in which Adam lays beneath a wall of lockers at school and uses his strength to push them up when Danielle walks by, while giving the appearance that Leo has pulled the lockers off of Adam to rescue him. However, once the plan is played out, Danielle instead becomes interested in Adam, who accepts her offer to the dance. Chase tries to convince Danielle to go with Leo instead, but she then asks Chase to the dance, which he accepts. As revenge, Leo tells Chase about a new dance craze that is actually nonexistent. At the dance, Danielle leaves Chase after he exhibits his unusual dance moves, and she winds up having a bad time with Adam as well. Leo impresses Danielle with his dance moves and gains her attention, but he decides to spend the rest of the evening with Adam and Chase, feeling sorry for them as this is their first school dance. Meanwhile, Bree likes a student named Ethan but becomes nervous when he is around. They agree to go to the dance, where he admits that he was also nervous about asking her out. Guest stars: Angel Parker as Tasha, Garrett Backstrom as Ethan, Ginny Gardner as Danielle Absent: Hal Sparks as Davenport
4	4	"Rats on a Train"	Victor Gonzalez	Ken Blankstein	March 19, 2012	107	0.86
Because of a mistake by the engineer, Davenport's high-speed bullet freight train speeds out of control toward a town, with enough toxic chemicals onboard to wipe it out. Chase, Adam, and Bree convince Davenport to send them out to stop the train, marking their first mission after years of training. Leo, upset that Davenport will not allow him on the mission, sneaks along by hiding in a bag. However, Chase, Adam, and Bree realize that Leo removed the decelerating device from the bag so he could fit in it. They devise an alternate plan to stop the train and are successful. Meanwhile, Tasha, a local news reporter, gets her first big reporting job by covering the runaway train. However, she and her cameraman have repeated trouble getting the train on camera until it is stopped. Guest star: Angel Parker as Tasha
5	5	"Exoskeleton vs. Grandma"	Victor Gonzalez	Ron Rappaport	April 6, 2012 (Note: This episode premiered on Disney Channel and later aired as technically a repeat on Disney XD on April 30, 2012. The viewership data for the Disney XD airing is 0.67 million viewers.)	106	2.24
When Tasha's mother, Rose, comes to visit the family, Tasha must pretend that Chase, Adam, and Bree are her staff to maintain their bionic secret. Meanwhile, Davenport has an upcoming web presentation in the lab, and Chase becomes upset when Leo is chosen over him to present Davenport's new exoskeleton suit. To get back at Leo, Chase reverses the controls on the exoskeleton, but it malfunctions when Leo tries to present it. The exoskeleton is stopped but later breaks out of the lab on its own and becomes a threat to the family, while also making Rose suspicious. Chase and Leo reconcile and work together to stop the exoskeleton. Afterward, when Rose demands answers, Davenport tells her that the Lab Rats are his brother's children, who he says he adopted after his brother fell into a volcano. Guest stars: Angel Parker as Tasha, Telma Hopkins as Grandma Rose
6	6	"Smart and Smarter"	Guy Distad	Chris Peterson & Bryan Moore	April 23, 2012	110	0.82
Chase launches a campaign to become Student of the Semester at Mission Creek High, by implementing ideas such as healthier food choices. However, his ideas are not well received by the students. Adam implements several ideas of his own to help Chase become popular with the students, but Chase does not acknowledge the success of Adam's ideas, leading him to run against Chase for Student of the Semester. Bree helps Chase realize that he regularly makes Adam feel unintelligent, so he decides to help Adam win instead. Meanwhile, Leo is almost late for one of his school classes. With no one around to see her bionics, Leo convinces Bree to use her bionic superspeed to get him there while he holds onto her. Leo begins consistently using Bree's superspeed around school despite her annoyance, eventually leading him to stop. Guest star: Garrett Backstrom as Ethan Absent: Hal Sparks as Davenport
7	7	"Bionic Birthday Fail"	Victor Gonzalez	Ron Rappaport	May 7, 2012	111	0.81
Tasha wins an award for her reporting, but the awards ceremony is on the same night as Leo's birthday. Although she plans for the family to celebrate his birthday on the following night, Leo is convinced that he will actually receive a surprise party on the night of his birthday. When Davenport and Tasha attend the ceremony, Chase, Adam and Bree decide to lock Leo in the lab while they put together a surprise party for him. Chase, Adam and Bree invite several of their favorite entertainers to the party and forget to let Leo out so he can enjoy it, only realizing their mistake after the party ends. To make it up to Leo, they let him try out their mission simulator in which they train their skills against artificial enemies. Guest stars: Angel Parker as Tasha, Will Forte as the voice of Eddy
8	8	"Death Spiral Smackdown"	Sean McNamara	Gigi McCreery & Perry Rein	June 7, 2012	108	0.48
For Fitness Challenge Week, Mission Creek High holds its Death Spiral Smackdown competition, in which student teams fight against each other while trying to knock opponents off a rotating platform. Leo chooses Adam as his teammate because of his bionic strength. Leo secretly feeds Adam power pellets that increase his adrenaline, and they win against all the other teams. Principal Perry then reveals that Leo and Adam must go against each other in a final round set for the following day. Leo is concerned about the final round, as Adam has become unstoppable from eating too many pellets. The next day, Leo locks Adam in the lab but he breaks free and consumes more power pellets. Meanwhile, Chase is upset when he learns that Bree lied to him about having to study for a test; she actually wanted to spend time with her new friends rather than him. To get revenge, Chase activates his Override App, which gives him control over Adam and Bree in emergencies. Chase uses his Override App to control Bree and embarrass her in front of her friends, but he and Bree later reconcile. During the final round of the Death Spiral Smackdown, Chase takes control of Adam using the Override App, to prevent him from harming Leo. Guest stars: Maile Flanagan as Principal Perry, Tucker Albrizzi as Gordo Absent: Hal Sparks as Davenport
9	9	"Can I Borrow the Helicopter?"	Victor Gonzalez	Gigi McCreery & Perry Rein	June 14, 2012	112	0.71
Leo confides to Davenport that he has a crush on a student named Janelle, and Davenport, excited by the father-son moment, tells Tasha about the crush. Leo is upset when he discovers that Davenport told his mother, but later forgives him. Davenport then lets Leo use Davenport's helicopter to take Janelle on a date. Meanwhile, Bree is annoyed by her brothers and wants her own room, and Tasha offers Bree her sewing room. This eventually causes tensions to increase between Chase and Adam who were initially excited to have the lab to themselves and end up dividing the lab in half. Bree is annoyed by Tasha's persistent presence in her new room, and she eventually decides to move back into the lab. Guest stars: Angel Parker as Tasha, Madison Pettis as Janelle
10	10	"Back from the Future"	Victor Gonzalez	Ron Rappaport	June 21, 2012	116	0.71
Davenport decides to send Adam, Bree and Chase to stop a particle collider before it creates a black hole that will implode the Earth. Future Leo travels seven years into the past to tell Leo and Davenport that Chase, Adam, and Bree will not make it to the future and that the only way to save them is to not let them go on their particle collider mission. Davenport decides to send an automated rover in their place, but Chase, Adam, and Bree go, anyway, since the whole world is in their hands. They successfully stop the particle collider. Leo goes after them and saves their life by pushing them aside when the dome collides, becoming trapped himself. Adam digs up Leo who ended up saving every one of them. Leo misses his date with Janelle which causes Future Leo to end up with a dog instead of Janelle as his bride. Special guest star: Tyler James Williams as Future Leo Guest star: Madison Pettis as Janelle
11	11	"Chip Switch"	Victor Gonzalez	Ken Blankstein	June 28, 2012	119	N/A
Chase, Adam, and Bree switch their bionic chips after Leo mentions such an idea. Chase has Adam's strength, Adam has Bree's speed, and Bree has Chase's intelligence. Ignoring Davenport's warning, they go to school which is having Emergency Preparedness Week. When the fire alarm goes off during a drill, Bree complains about the noise due to her heightened sense of hearing which Chase has conditioned himself to. Chase tries to destroy the bell with his heat vision; however, he is not used to it and accidentally traps Leo and Principal Perry inside an elevator. Chase is unable to devise a solution to free them, so Chase, Adam, and Bree race home and try to switch back their chips, but it backfires when Chase ends up with Bree's speed, Adam ends up with Chase's intelligence, and Bree ends up with Adam's strength. Back at the school, Adam figures out that Bree can pull the elevator cables, lifting Leo and Principal Perry to safety. This works, but Davenport later busts them, though he is glad that they have learned their lesson about chip switching. Guest star: Maile Flanagan as Principal Perry
12	12	"Drone Alone"	Jody Margolin Hahn	Mark Brazill	July 5, 2012	114	N/A
While Davenport and Tasha go on vacation, Chase, Adam, Bree, and Leo all promise to behave; however, the promise is not kept. At night, Leo turns on Davenport's electromagnetic pulse device, thinking it is a nightlight. In the morning, Leo wakes up to find that Chase can only see pixels and Adam is talking backward. They tell Leo that Bree began running in the night and that they do not know where she went. Leo learns that their glitches occurred because of the electromagnetic pulse. Chase uses the computer to track Bree and give her coordinates to return. Chase also manages to fix his and Adam's glitches. Bree manages to run home by using a map and Chase finds out he tracked one of Davenport's drones by mistake which controls Davenport's plane, forcing Eddy to steer the plane back. Later, Davenport returns and grounds Chase, Adam, Bree, and Leo. Guest stars: Angel Parker as Tasha, Will Forte as the voice of Eddy
13	13	"Chore Wars"	Sean McNamara	Heather Flanders	July 12, 2012	109	N/A
Chase, Adam, and Bree start doing chores around the house to earn an allowance like Leo does. However, it goes awry when they get greedy and accidentally sell an old jewelry box Davenport was fixing for Tasha. Meanwhile, Leo wants to see a new Pig Zombie film which Tasha forbids him to go to. He gets Davenport to go with him, with Davenport not knowing Tasha said no. Later, Davenport finds out about the jewelry box's disappearance and punishes Chase, Adam, and Bree by making them do every filthy, disgusting chore in the house without their bionics for a month. Meanwhile, when Tasha finds out that Leo disobeyed her and lied to Davenport, she grounds Leo and forbids him to watch television for a week. Tasha later allows Leo to watch the Pig Zombie movie marathon in exchange for extending Leo's grounding to a month. Guest stars: Angel Parker as Tasha, Will Forte as the voice of Eddy
14	14	"Dude, Where's My Lab?"	Victor Gonzalez	Marcus Alexander Hart	July 16, 2012	115	N/A
Davenport and Tasha take the family on a trip to the beach, where Tasha hopes for the family to have a day without technology. However, Davenport learns of a solar flare headed toward Earth. Davenport and Tasha spend time on the beach, while he has Adam, Bree and Chase stay in the family's RV, which contains a secret built-in lab where they must wait for the appropriate time to launch a rocket that will prevent the solar flare. Adam, Bree and Chase sneak out of the RV to briefly spend time with Leo on the boardwalk, but they return to find that the RV has been towed away. They use their bionic abilities, passing them off as special talents, to perform at the boardwalk and earn money to retrieve the RV. However, they are jailed for not having performance permits. Davenport, Leo and the Lab Rats eventually get the RV back and stop the solar flare. Guest star: Angel Parker as Tasha, Judson Mills as Beach Sheriff
15	15	"Air Leo"	Guy Distad	Heather Flanders	October 8, 2012	117	0.64
When Leo wants to impress Janelle by beating the school bully Trent in basketball, Chase lends him Davenport's anti-gravity shoes. However, when Trent steals the shoes, Chase uses a gadget that makes the shoes dance with Trent in them. Trent takes the shoes off and Janelle discovers what has been going on. After Janelle talks with Leo about why she dislikes people like Trent, in the second round, Leo scores a goal by himself. Meanwhile, Adam and Bree compete for a spot on the cheerleading squad. Adam wins, but when squad member Stephanie makes fun of Bree, Adam quits, and he and Bree make their own cheer and shame Stephanie and the cheerleaders out of the court. Guest stars: Madison Pettis as Janelle, Eddie Perino as Trent, Oana Gregory as Stephanie Absent: Hal Sparks as Davenport
16	16	"Night of the Living Virus"	Victor Gonzalez	Mark Brazill	October 15, 2012	104	0.59
Leo desperately wants to be Davenport's lab assistant, but he accidentally corrupts the smart-home system, turning Eddy into an evil demonic virus named Teddy. Meanwhile, Bree holds a sleepover with her friends, unaware that they only wanted to come because of the house she lives in. At the same time, Chase and Adam try to pull a prank on the girls. Guest stars: Angel Parker as Tasha, Oana Gregory as Stephanie, Michaela Carrozzo as Caitlin, Will Forte as the voice of Eddy
17	17	"Mission Invisible"	Victor Gonzalez	Carla Banks Waddles	October 22, 2012	113	0.60
After using their bionics to save Leo from a falling air conditioning unit at school, Chase, Adam and Bree learn their bionics have been caught on Principal Perry's surveillance camera, but she has not viewed the footage yet. In order to stop her from showing Davenport and Tasha the film on parent-teacher night, Leo uses Davenport's invisibility cloak to sneak into her office. However, when Leo gets caught, Chase, Adam, and Bree must think of a new plan. Guest stars: Angel Parker as Tasha, Maile Flanagan as Principal Perry
18	18	"Concert in a Can"	Victor Gonzalez	Mark Brazill	October 29, 2012	118	0.59
Chase and Adam befriend a new student named Marcus at school and form a band with him, but Leo is suspicious of Marcus. After Leo joins the band, Marcus breaks his own guitar and blames Leo. Meanwhile, Bree plans to bond with Davenport on Career Day at school, but gets upset when she finds out Davenport has been planning something with the boys. Leo brings along a tablet with Eddy's home system recording installed on it, showing that he did not break Marcus' guitar, but before he shows everyone, Marcus confesses to breaking the guitar. After a pretend breakdown, he then tells Leo to never tell on him again or else. Guest stars: Mateus Ward as Marcus, Will Forte as the voice of Eddy
19	19	"Mission: Space"	Victor Gonzalez	Chris Peterson & Bryan Moore	November 5, 2012	120	0.85
At school, Chase, Adam, and Bree agree to let Marcus stay at their house for the weekend because his father is out of town and he does not want to stay with his grandmother. Chase, Adam, and Bree discover they have secret bionic abilities, but when they confront Davenport, they find out that he does not know what their secret abilities are or when they will become known. When Marcus comes over, Chase, Adam, and Bree have to go into space because Davenport's satellite is about to get hit by a meteor shower due to a breach. They get there and fix the breach, but Adam accidentally breaks his tether with his heat vision and Bree ends up rescuing him, with help from Chase and his newly discovered molecularkinesis ability. Marcus infiltrates the lab and places a microscopic spy camera inside. Later, Marcus notifies a mysterious man about his infiltration in Davenport's lab. Guest star: Mateus Ward as Marcus

=== Season 2 (2013–14) ===
No. overall	No. in season	Title	Directed by	Written by	Original release date	Prod. code	U.S. viewers (millions)
20	1	"Speed Trapped"	Victor Gonzalez	Chris Peterson & Bryan Moore	February 25, 2013	203	1.01
Chase, Adam, and Bree sneak out to a party Marcus is at in Davenport's new self-driving car. At the party, Marcus programs the car to go to the bottom of the Pacific Ocean, and when Leo tries to stop Marcus, he becomes trapped in the car which then speeds toward the ocean. Chase, Adam, and Bree manage to rescue Leo in time, though they are unaware that it was Marcus' doing. Later, Marcus reveals to Leo that he is bionic like Chase, Adam, and Bree and that if Leo tells anyone, Marcus will tell the world about Chase, Adam, and Bree's secret. Meanwhile, Davenport and Tasha try to celebrate their one-year anniversary, but Eddy keeps interrupting them. Guest stars: Angel Parker as Tasha, Mateus Ward as Marcus, Will Forte as the voice of Eddy
21	2	"Spy Fly"	Guy Distad	Ken Blankstein	March 4, 2013	201	0.68
Leo uses Davenport's robotic fly to mess with Bree, but he goes too far when he uses its spy camera to cheat off Bree's test at school. When Bree scolds Leo for cheating, Principal Perry gives her an F for talking during the test. However, when Principal Perry finds and keeps the robotic fly, a swarm of them is accidentally released during a struggle between her and Leo over the container which paralyze the students, and the only way Bree will help is if Leo confesses he cheated. Leo confesses and Bree creates a tornado with her speed to capture the flies in the container. Meanwhile, Chase and Adam must take care of baby dolls for a class, but it ends up in a battle between them, with them hurting each other's babies in various ways. Guest star: Maile Flanagan as Principal Perry Absent: Hal Sparks as Davenport
22	3	"Missin' the Mission"	Victor Gonzalez	Hayes Jackson	March 11, 2013	202	0.43
Leo wants to be a part of the team, but Davenport will not let him. When Davenport discovers a gas leak at a facility, he calls Chase, Adam, and Bree, but they are stuck in detention with Principal Perry for missing school during their other missions. Leo goes instead, much to Davenport's dismay. Eddy, who received a full robot body from Davenport, also goes on the mission. Leo soon proves to be worthy when he devises a solution to the gas leak, by sacrificing Eddy's new body. Later, Leo officially becomes a member of the team as someone who watches over missions and gives ideas and advice, and Eddy is returned to his former location within the walls of Davenport's house. Guest stars: Maile Flanagan as Principal Perry, Will Forte as the voice of Eddy
23	4	"Quarantined"	Victor Gonzalez	Marcus Alexander Hart	March 18, 2013	205	0.59
Bree has a crush on Owen, a student who is an artist. While going on a mission to receive samples to bust criminals, Bree is exposed to one of the chemicals that she is collecting when she is not paying attention. Upon learning that Bree is infected, Chase, Adam, and Davenport try to figure out what is wrong and how to undo it. Leo tries to make sure Bree does not reveal her bionics when she sneaks out to see Owen's art at school. At the art show, however, the side effects of the chemical Bree was exposed to begin to manifest, causing her to lose control of her body. Guest stars: Ben Stillwell as Owen, Sean Whalen as Security Guard
24	5	"Robot Fight Club"	Sean Lambert	Hayes Jackson	March 25, 2013	210	0.59
Chase and Leo decide to build a robot and enter it in a robot combat competition. They let Davenport join their team, but they kick him off after he wrecks their robot to demonstrate its weakness. He then enters the competition himself, going head-to-head against Chase and Leo. Meanwhile, Bree accidentally exposes her bionic speed to her friend Caitlin, who then leaves in a fluster. Caitlin confesses she has a crush on Adam and he becomes her boyfriend so that he can convince her she did not see anything unusual. When Adam and Caitlin are on their date, Caitlin confesses she has to wear glasses and therefore did not see anything earlier. She explains she ran off after noticing Adam. Adam does not like Caitlin, and convinces her that her true crush is Chase, but he does not want to be with her either. Guest stars: Mark Christopher Lawrence as Announcer, Michaela Carrozzo as Caitlin
25	6	"Bro Down"	Victor Gonzalez	Mark Brazill	April 1, 2013	204	0.91
Adam dislocates his arm after Chase pulls a prank on him. After realizing how dangerous the world can be, Adam becomes overly concerned about safety and eventually decides to quit the team to avoid getting hurt again. Chase and Bree realize they cannot go on missions without Adam, so Chase and Davenport come up with a plan that convinces Adam to rejoin the team. Meanwhile, Bree discovers she has a vocal manipulation ability that allows her to copy other people's voices, but she gets grounded for using it to make fun of Principal Perry. Guest star: Maile Flanagan as Principal Perry
26	7	"The Rats Strike Back"	Victor Gonzalez	Julia Miranda	April 8, 2013	206	0.52
Chase, Adam, and Bree go on strike with Leo as their leader due to Davenport's refusal to give them a day off. A NASA representative plans to visit Davenport earlier than expected to see a presentation of his new gravity propulsion belt, a device that allows astronauts to spacewalk anywhere in the galaxy. Chase, Adam, and Bree are upset when Leo abandons the strike to accept Davenport's offer of presenting the gravity belt. However, Leo is unaware that Davenport is using him to get Chase, Adam, and Bree to surrender and end the strike. When the NASA representative arrives, Davenport agrees to give Chase, Adam, and Bree time off if they will do the presentation for him, as Leo is not properly trained for it. Davenport's presentation is ruined when Leo accidentally activates the gravity belt and recklessly hovers around the house, prompting the representative to leave without purchasing it. Later, Chase, Adam, and Bree forgive Leo for betraying the strike. Guest star: Angel Parker as Tasha
27	8	"Parallel Universe"	Guy Distad	Ron Rappaport	June 17, 2013	207	0.74
One of Davenport's inventions accidentally sucks Leo into a parallel universe, where Chase, Adam, and Bree are powerless and Leo is the one with bionics and everything is backward. Tasha is a technology genius, Davenport is her assistant, Principal Perry is nice, Chase is a jock, Adam is a philosophical nerd, and Bree is popular. Chase, Adam, and Bree do not know Leo and are not related to him, being known as the Hendersons; when he exposes his bionics to them, they contact government agents who attempt to capture him for research. He and Davenport have to get him back to his universe before Leo ends up in government lockdown. Guest stars: Angel Parker as Tasha, Maile Flanagan as Principal Perry, Tim Russ as Agent Gordon
28	9	"Spike's Got Talent"	Guy Distad	Julia Miranda	June 24, 2013	208	0.65
Leo decides to enter the school talent show by performing a magic act, and Chase is upset that he is not pictured in the yearbook. To achieve popularity, Chase uses his molecular kinesis in the talent show auditions for his own magic act, but he takes Leo's spot in the show, which upsets Leo. Back at home, Eddy gives Leo a device to interrupt Chase's bionics during the show. At the talent show, Leo disables Chase's molecular kinesis, causing Chase to get booed at, which in turn activates his Commando App and turns him into Spike. Leo calms him down, but induces Spike again by insulting Chase. Leo tries using the device to shut Spike down, but ends up causing Spike's aggression levels to soar. Principal Perry then takes Spike down, reverting him to Chase. Meanwhile, Adam and Owen create a butter sculpture of Perry for the talent show. Bree is upset about Owen spending time with Adam, so she has Eddy turn up the heat in the house to melt the sculpture. Owen becomes upset when Eddy reveals that Bree wanted the sculpture to melt. Bree makes it up to Owen by making him a new statue out of popcorn. Guest stars: Maile Flanagan as Principal Perry, Ben Stillwell as Owen, Will Forte as the voice of Eddy Absent: Hal Sparks as Davenport
29	10	"Leo vs. Evil"	Victor Gonzalez	Ron Rappaport	June 24, 2013	211	0.81
After seeing Marcus at school, Leo follows him to his house, which contains a lair. He gets photographic evidence on his cell phone that not only proves that Marcus is evil, but that he also wants Chase, Adam, and Bree. Unfortunately, he is captured by Marcus and he orders his robot to kill him. Leo escapes by out-thinking Marcus with a move Chase used to beat Adam at arm wrestling. Meanwhile, Chase, Adam, and Bree try out Davenport's new teleporter, but accidentally teleport Tasha somewhere with no knowledge of where she went. They learn that trying to teleport Tasha back could result in her becoming disfigured during the process, so Chase and Davenport try to correct the machine. Because of Adam's low intelligence, they ignore his idea for bringing Tasha home. When Tasha returns home, she tells them she was teleported to Fresno and was contacted by Adam, who told her about the teleportation mishap. She then followed Adam's idea of returning home on a bus. Leo returns to the lab and tries to bust Marcus, but he accidentally drops his phone into the teleporter, which destroys the phone. Leo then leads the others to Marcus' house, but they do not believe his claims as the house appears normal. Inside, Marcus' father tells Marcus that he has failed him and that he will have to take care of Chase, Adam, Bree, and Davenport himself. Guest stars: Angel Parker as Tasha, Mateus Ward as Marcus, Jeremy Kent Jackson as Shadowy Figure, Will Forte as the voice of Eddy
30	11	"Hole in One"	Victor Gonzalez	Sib Ventress	July 1, 2013	217	0.67
Davenport buys a $1 million abstract art painting and has Chase, Adam, Bree, and Leo store it away in his underground art vault. When Adam sneezes, it triggers his heat vision which burns a hole into the painting. Chase and Bree try to fix the problem by using their bionics to paint a replica, but the plan is jeopardized when Davenport decides to sell the painting. After receiving a tip from a prospective buyer, the FBI arrives and accuses Davenport of trying to sell forged art, which prompts the others to tell the truth about the original painting. While the FBI searches the house for more forged art, Adam, Bree and Chase go to their school, where Adam disposed of the original painting in a dumpster. They learn that Perry has created an indoor golf course using trash and other items, including the painting. Bree plays golf against Perry and wins back the painting. Meanwhile, the FBI nearly discovers the lab and Davenport's secrets until the others return with the original painting, proving Davenport's innocence. Guest stars: Maile Flanagan as Principal Perry, Laird Macintosh as Agent Ryker
31	12	"Trucked Out"	Victor Gonzalez	Hayes Jackson	July 8, 2013	220	0.73
Adam gets his driver's license and Davenport takes him to get a car; however, when Davenport has to leave the car dealership early, he lets Adam finish the purchase on his own. Adam gets a monster truck instead of the intended car. Davenport is about to take back the truck, but he and Adam decide to keep it and take a joyride. Meanwhile, Leo is bragging about how he was invited to a party, but when Tasha runs for PTA president and embarrasses him, he worries he will be uninvited. He then has Bree use her voice manipulation to make Tasha seem like she is making fun of Principal Perry, which causes Principal Perry to decide to run against Tasha. Later, Perry wins the vote when Adam and Davenport accidentally crash the monster truck into the school. Guest stars: Angel Parker as Tasha, Maile Flanagan as Principal Perry
32	13	"The Bionic 500"	Victor Gonzalez	Julia Miranda	July 22, 2013	223	0.66
Leo wants the corner locker at school, only to find out it has been taken by his neighbor, Clayton Harrington. Meanwhile, Davenport has grown tired of Pierce, Clayton's obnoxious ultra-rich father, who is driving up and down his lawn. He decides to end their feud through a stock car race, with the loser having to give up their house. However, he quickly finds out that he will need the help of Chase, Adam, Bree, and Leo when his neighbor enlists the help of NASCAR's Joey Logano to win the race. Davenport fires his pit crew, who have been paid by Pierce to sabotage his car, and Chase, Adam, Bree, and Leo become his new pit crew. Upon learning of the sabotage, Joey leaves Pierce and Clayton to join the other team and help Davenport win. Davenport eventually wins the race, Pierce and Clayton move out of the neighborhood, and Leo gets the corner locker. Guest stars: Joey Logano as himself, Maile Flanagan as Principal Perry, Craig Zimmerman as Pierce, JT Neal as Clayton
33	14	"Bionic Showdown"	Victor Gonzalez	Chris Peterson & Bryan Moore	August 5, 2013	212–213	1.37
After Davenport only seems to point out what they do wrong, Chase, Adam, and Bree get annoyed with him. Meanwhile, Marcus disables Eddy and he and his father capture Davenport. Using Davenport as bait, they lure Chase, Adam, and Bree to their lair. Marcus, who has enhanced forms of all their bionic abilities, defeats Adam and Bree easily. Chase uses a new ability, levitation, and Marcus feigns defeat. Douglas, Marcus' father, transports them into Davenport's cage and says that he is also their father. Davenport and Douglas jointly founded Davenport Industries, but had a falling out after Douglas went behind Davenport's back and implanted bionics, which they had designed for robots, into human subjects. Douglas then built Marcus, an android. Douglas created Chase, Adam, and Bree with a Triton App so that he could control them, but Davenport disabled the app shortly after he took the bionic siblings away from him. While Douglas works on an override to reactive the Triton App, Leo arrives and Marcus seemingly kills him with an electric bolt. Chase, Adam, and Bree deactivate the cage. Davenport and Douglas then fight over the Triton App remote. Marcus defeats Chase, Adam, and Bree, but Leo arrives in the exoskeleton, having been wearing a bulletproof vest which saved him from Marcus' earlier attack. Davenport crushes the remote while Marcus knocks Leo down and prepares to kill him. Adam gets angry and unlocks a hidden ability, a bionic blast wave, which destroys the lair and knocks Marcus down. Douglas escapes, but Marcus is crushed by rubble, and Chase, Adam, and Bree help each other get out. Davenport says he is proud of them, and they tell him that they view him as their real father. Guest stars: Jeremy Kent Jackson as Douglas Davenport, Mateus Ward as Marcus, Will Forte as the voice of Eddy Note: This is a double-length special episode.
34	15	"Memory Wipe"	Victor Gonzalez	Ron Rappaport	August 19, 2013	219	0.51
When Davenport catches Chase, Adam, Bree, and Leo coming home two hours past curfew, he grounds them for three weeks. Davenport has won a presidential award for the creation of a memory-erasing device, and he agrees to let Tasha interview him for her news station as he receives the award at the house. The children use Davenport's memory-erasing device to make him forget that he grounded them. However, Leo goes too far and accidentally erases 24 years instead of 24 hours, rendering him a teenager. When Chase tries to fix it, he wipes Davenport's memory again and turns him into a four-and-a-half-year old just as he is about to be interviewed by Tasha. After Davenport's interview, the children restore him to normal. When Davenport discovers that Chase, Adam, Bree, and Leo were using his memory-erasing device, he grounds them indefinitely. Guest stars: Angel Parker as Tasha
35	16	"Avalanche!"	Victor Gonzalez	Mark Brazill	September 16, 2013	214	0.72
Adam and Bree are always saying that super strength and super speed always make a good team, so Chase tries to prove to them and Davenport that super intelligence can be good on its own. Davenport arranges for Chase, Adam, and Bree to go on a mission in Antarctica to obtain the element needed to power his new freezing gun. He calls off the mission due to a snow storm, but Chase goes, anyway, wanting to prove to Adam and Bree that he can complete a mission by himself. Meanwhile, Leo accidentally freezes Janelle and Tasha with the freezing gun. In Antarctica, Chase ends up getting trapped by an avalanche. He is rescued by Douglas, who presents him with a tempting offer to work together and be given Adam and Bree's bionic abilities. Chase agrees to the offer and brings Douglas to Davenport's lab to carry out the plan, but he then freezes Douglas, stating that he would never betray his family. Guest stars: Angel Parker as Tasha, Jeremy Kent Jackson as Douglas Davenport, Madison Pettis as Janelle
36	17	"Adam Up"	Victor Gonzalez	Greg Schaffer	September 23, 2013	218	0.51
When Chase, Adam, and Bree are completing their training, Adam gets bored of training and wants to have fun. He creates a duplicate of himself with Davenport's cellular duplicator; however, things get out of hand when the duplicate learns how to multiply himself. Eventually, all of the duplicates are destroyed. Meanwhile, Chase and Bree have to babysit Principal Perry's niece, Kerry Perry, who acts nice around her, but is actually blackmailing them. Guest stars: Maile Flanagan as Principal Perry, Grace Kaufman as Kerry Perry, Will Forte as the voice of Eddy Absent: Hal Sparks as Davenport
37	18	"Llama Drama"	Guy Distad	Ken Blankstein	September 30, 2013	216	0.58
Principal Perry puts Chase and Adam in charge of watching the school's dingo mascot costume, as students from another school, Deerfield High School, always steal it prior to Mission Creek High's homecoming dance. While Adam is left alone to watch the Dingo mascot, he is outsmarted by a Deerfield High School student who then takes the mascot. In retaliation, Adam takes Deerfield's school mascot: a living llama. Before Chase and Adam return the llama, they discover it has consumed Davenport's mechanical nanobots, so they use a magnet to retrieve them. Meanwhile, Bree and Leo agree to help Caitlin win in the school's domino competition, but they realize she is obsessed with winning. Upset with the way Caitlin treats them, Bree and Leo decide to form their own domino team and ultimately win the competition. Guest stars: Maile Flanagan as Principal Perry, Michaela Carrozzo as Caitlin Absent: Hal Sparks as Davenport
38	19	"The Haunting of Mission Creek High"	Jody Margolin Hahn	Ken Blankstein	October 14, 2013	209	0.92
After Principal Perry tells everyone a story about a ghost janitor who haunts Mission Creek High, Chase, Adam, and Leo decide to take advantage of Trent's fear of ghosts for a little revenge. However, they soon start to believe that the ghost is real when strange events occur at the school. Meanwhile, Bree and Owen have different opinions on how to decorate the gym for the homecoming dance. At the dance, Chase, Adam and Leo attempt to capture the ghost janitor, but they learn that Principal Perry was behind the whole thing with the use of special effects. Guest stars: Maile Flanagan as Principal Perry, Eddie Perino as Trent, Ben Stillwell as Owen Absent: Hal Sparks as Davenport
39	20	"Perry 2.0"	David DeLuise	Julia Miranda	November 11, 2013	215	0.96
Chase and Leo are upset with their school's lack of technological advances, so Davenport decides to modernize the school, while assuring them that he will not let his ego interfere with his plans as he typically does. Chase and Leo are initially pleased with Davenport's ideas until he unveils a robotic version of Principal Perry to help operate the school, which makes Chase and Leo unpopular among the students, who dislike having a second Perry around. Chase alters "Robo Perry" to be unfocused while unknowingly restoring the robot to its original factory settings: search and destroy. When the school board comes to Mission Creek High for a tour of Davenport's upgrades, Robo Perry goes on a rampage and fights with the real Perry, who destroys the robot in a fight. Meanwhile, an Irish foreign exchange student named Alistair arrives at the school, and Adam and Bree become convinced that he is another android like Marcus who has been sent to spy on them. They eventually realize they were wrong about Alistair. Guest stars: Maile Flanagan as Principal Perry, Matthew J. Evans as Alistair
40	21	"My Little Brother"	Victor Gonzalez	Jason Dorris	November 18, 2013	224	0.75
Chase decreases Adam's super strength after it becomes too strong, but he accidentally causes Adam to shrink to the size of two inches and then takes advantage of the situation to get back at Adam for all the times he called him short. However, Chase begins to regret it when he loses Adam. Meanwhile, Bree speaks out against the way Principal Perry operates the school, so Perry makes Bree the principal for a day. However, Bree finds it hard to handle when Perry decides to act like a student. Later, Bree calls Perry's mother to get her to behave. Guest star: Maile Flanagan as Principal Perry, Peggy Miley as Mother Perry Absent: Hal Sparks as Davenport
41	22	"Prank You Very Much"	Victor Gonzalez	Ken Blankstein	November 25, 2013	222	0.60
When Bree gets tired of always being pranked by Chase and Adam, she asks Davenport for help. However, whenever she tries to prank Chase and Adam, her pranks end up failing. Chase and Adam's pranks start getting out of hand when Tasha gets sprayed in the face with ketchup and mustard after she opens a cupboard. This upsets Tasha and she joins Bree in planning a revenge prank; later, Bree and Tasha successfully prank Chase and Adam back. Meanwhile, Grandma Rose comes to visit and begins to interfere with Leo and Janelle's relationship. Guest stars: Angel Parker as Tasha, Telma Hopkins as Grandma Dooley, Madison Pettis as Janelle
42	23	" 'Twas the Mission Before Christmas"	Guy Distad	Mark Brazill	December 2, 2013	221	0.81
On Christmas Eve, Davenport learns that one of his research facilities near the North Pole is experiencing aftershocks following a volcanic eruption. Davenport sends Chase, Adam, and Bree on a mission to save Dr. Evans from the facility. After aiding Dr. Evans in stabilizing several of his machines, an aftershock causes his gammasphere to crack. Chase has to use his force field to contain the highly dangerous gamma rays while Dr. Evans devises a solution to permanently contain the gamma rays, ultimately deciding to implode the facility to contain them. Dr. Evans and the others evacuate the facility before it implodes, and the plan is a success. Meanwhile, Principal Perry stays in Davenport's mansion and makes Christmas miserable for him, Leo, and Tasha. Later, Principal Perry makes up for it by making a beautiful dinner for the family. Guest stars: Noah Wyle as Dr. Evans, Angel Parker as Tasha, Maile Flanagan as Principal Perry
43	24	"Trent Gets Schooled"	Victor Gonzalez	Jessica Gao	January 6, 2014	225	0.68
Trent asks for help on his test from Chase and Leo, and they decide it is a good chance to get back at him for picking on them. They program Davenport's educational Daven-glasses with fake information and Trent fails the test. Principal Perry tells them that Trent would have graduated if he had passed the test and they convince her to let him take it again. This time they truthfully help him study, using Leo's pain as inspiration. After Trent graduates, they find out he is now their gym teacher. Meanwhile, Bree wants to look good in her yearbook photo, so she goes to the hair salon; however, Adam accidentally burns off half of her hair and they ask Davenport to fix it. Adam causes further problems by putting too much hair growth cream on Bree. On Picture Day, her bangs grow over her face when Principal Perry takes the photo. Guest stars: Maile Flanagan as Principal Perry, Eddie Perino as Trent
44	25	"No Going Back"	Victor Gonzalez	Chris Peterson & Bryan Moore	January 13, 2014	226	0.74
At school, Chase, Adam, and Bree are forced to use their bionics to save Principal Perry's life from a loose electrical wire. Meanwhile, Davenport is hacked by a mysterious hacker who later uses all of Davenport's credit cards and hacks his computer networks. When an FBI agent comes to the house to investigate the hacking, Chase, Adam, and Bree mistakenly believe that Perry has reported their bionic secret to the authorities. Chase, Adam, and Bree decide to run away to protect themselves and Davenport, as their absence will mean a lack of evidence for their existence. They leave the house and deactivate their GPS signals so the FBI cannot find them. Principal Perry agrees to keep the bionic secret if Davenport pays her off with hush money, but he subsequently loses the house and his money after the hacker forges his signature and authorizes a liquidation of his bank accounts. It is later revealed that Douglas is the hacker and that he was released by a mysterious masked man with bionics. Later, Douglas sets off explosives in the lab, but Leo and Davenport escape in the elevator. Guest stars: Angel Parker as Tasha, Maile Flanagan as Principal Perry, Jeremy Kent Jackson as Douglas Davenport, Jeff Doucette as Bank Rep, Will Forte as the voice of Eddy

=== Season 3 (2014–15) ===
No. overall	No. in season	Title	Directed by	Written by	Original release date	Prod. code	U.S. viewers (millions)
45	1	"Sink or Swim"	Victor Gonzalez	Chris Peterson & Bryan Moore and Hayes Jackson	February 17, 2014	301–302	1.05
Principal Perry lets Leo, Davenport, and Tasha stay at the school temporarily so they can track down Adam, Bree and Chase quicker, allowing Davenport to get her hush money sooner. Chase, Adam, and Bree stow away on a cargo ship to hide from the FBI, but they are caught by the crew, who have contacted the Coast Guard to arrest them. Before the Coast Guard arrives, Chase, Adam, and Bree decide to use their bionics to save a nearby sinking submarine. Chase activates his GPS for the mission, revealing their location aboard the ship. After rescuing the submarine, Douglas ends up capturing them, disguised as Davenport. Douglas reveals that his new partner is a billionaire named Victor Krane, who has had Douglas implant him with various bionic abilities. Meanwhile, Davenport regains the house, and Chase, Adam, and Bree eventually escape and return home after Davenport tells them that Principal Perry kept their secret. However, once the three of them are home, they are put under the control of Douglas's Triton App and attack Davenport, Leo, and Tasha. Leo manages to disable Chase's Triton App when he talks to him and reminds him of all their good memories together. Once Chase snaps out of it, he manages to disable Adam and Bree's Triton Apps. Douglas is upset when Krane orders him to destroy Adam, Bree and Chase, something that was never part of Douglas's plans. Later, the family sees the destruction that happened to the lab and is upset. Guest stars: Angel Parker as Tasha, Maile Flanagan as Principal Perry, Jeremy Kent Jackson as Douglas Davenport, Casey Sander as Captain, Graham Shiels as Krane Note: This is a double-length special episode.
46	2	"The Jet Wing"	Victor Gonzalez	Ron Rappaport	February 24, 2014	303	0.49
Chase, Adam, and Bree are forced to go without their sleeping capsules, which were destroyed in the lab explosion. Without the capsules, their bionics are prone to eventual glitches. In order to prevent this, Davenport pulls off a sponsored stunt by flying a fiberglass jet wing he invented, to raise money to rebuild the lab. However, things go wrong when the jet wing runs out of fuel. Meanwhile, Principal Perry uses Adam and Bree as her bionic servants for the day. Guest stars: Angel Parker as Tasha, Maile Flanagan as Principal Perry
47	3	"Mission: Mission Creek High"	Guy Distad	Julia Miranda	March 3, 2014	304	0.63
After receiving her hush money from Davenport, Principal Perry uses it to purchase a new car. When Perry learns that Chase, Adam, and Bree use their bionics for missions, she repeatedly insists that they take her on one of their missions. They decide to stage a fake mission and take Principal Perry down to the newly built lab, but things go awry when she accidentally launches a rocket. Chase, Adam, and Bree must then save Mission Creek High before the rocket hits. Adam uses his strength to toss Perry's new car at the rocket and destroy it before it hits the school. Meanwhile, Janelle goes on a date with Leo, but is beginning to see him as a jinx because she always gets hurt when he is around. Guest stars: Maile Flanagan as Principal Perry, Madison Pettis as Janelle, Will Forte as the voice of Eddy
48	4	"Zip It"	Guy Distad	Greg Schaffer	March 10, 2014	305	0.70
To be away from her brothers, Bree gets a part-time job with Caitlin at Tech Town, an electronics store, but she is upset when her manager Scott decides to hire Chase as well. Bree gets outshined by Chase, who later realizes how she feels; they agree to treat each other with respect. Meanwhile, while Tasha is away visiting Grandma Rose, she has given Davenport, Adam and Leo a list of chores to do around the house. To complete their chores faster, Adam and Leo make a turbo zip-line to get around quicker, but they wind up ignoring their chores to have fun with the zip-line, with Davenport joining them later. When Tasha returns, she finds out about the zip-line and makes Davenport, Adam and Leo do the chores while she herself has fun on the turbo zip-line. Guest stars: Angel Parker as Tasha, Michaela Carrozzo as Caitlin, Dustin Ingram as Scott
49	5	"Not So Smart Phone"	Victor Gonzalez	Ken Blankstein	March 24, 2014	306	0.57
Leo uses Chase's new ePhone 7 to film a video of Chase and Adam using their bionics for bowling stunts in the lab, but Chase later loses the phone at Tech Town while working. Meanwhile, Davenport waits in a long line outside the Tech Town store so he can purchase an ePhone 7 for Tasha as an anniversary present. After the ePhones are sold out, Chase realizes his phone is being used in the store as a display model. Caitlin, who does not like crowds, is overwhelmed by the large number of customers trying to get the last ePhone, and she angrily destroys it while trying to make them realize their obsession with technology. Scott then fires Caitlin from the store. At school, Perry announces her retirement as principal now that she has her hush money from Davenport, but Leo is upset to learn that Trent has been hired as the new principal. Deciding that Perry is better than Trent, Bree and Leo create a plan to help Perry spend all of her money on various things so she will have to stay as principal. Perry decides she is not satisfied with her new possessions and realizes that tormenting students is what she truly enjoys, prompting her to remain as principal. Guest stars: Maile Flanagan as Principal Perry, Michaela Carrozzo as Caitlin, Eddie Perino as Trent, Dustin Ingram as Scott
50	6	"Scramble the Orbs"	Guy Distad	Karen Jacobs	April 7, 2014	307	0.49
Leo invents his first technological creation, a pair of attack orbs to protect himself and the others; however, things go awry when they cannot tell friend from foe. Meanwhile, Tech Town holds an employee competition to see who can create the best-selling application. To beat Scott in the contest, Chase steals Davenport's Eddy technology to create a personal assistant named Cheddy. Chase's plan fails when Cheddy begins acting like Eddy by insulting people who installed the application. Meanwhile, Leo and Tasha go to see Janelle's school play, in which Adam has a small role. When Trent steals Leo's ticket, his orbs attack Trent and wind up ruining the play. Guest stars: Angel Parker as Tasha, Madison Pettis as Janelle, Eddie Perino as Trent, Dustin Ingram as Scott Note: Will Forte as the voice of Eddy appears in this episode, but is not credited.
51	7	"Principal from Another Planet"	Victor Gonzalez	Mark Brazill	April 14, 2014	316	0.76
During a lunar eclipse, Principal Perry arrives at the house to inform everyone that aliens are on the planet, much to everyone's shock. Later, Chase gets an upset stomach and Principal Perry insists that it is due to an alien growing inside him. However, they notice green goop leaking out of Principal Perry's ears and mouth which prompts Davenport to admit that she is an alien. Principal Perry chases everyone, while Leo records the whole thing, and eventually tires herself out. Leo accidentally wakes her and she runs off with him to the school, where she traps him in alien goo and lays alien eggs. When Chase, Adam, and Bree arrive at the school, Adam uses his heat vision to destroy the eggs which frees Leo. A mother ship then beams Principal Perry away but quickly returns her, without the alien inside of her. It is then revealed the whole thing was Leo's entrant in an amateur sci-fi film festival. Guest star: Maile Flanagan as Principal Perry
52	8	"Taken"	Victor Gonzalez	Mark Brazill	April 21, 2014	308	0.59
Chase, Adam, Bree, and Davenport are contacted by Douglas, who tries to convince them that Krane has gone insane and is implanting himself with bionic abilities that even he did not know about. However, Davenport believes that Douglas is using Krane to assist him in another trick. For security reasons, Davenport installs the Daven-wall, a state-of-the-art security gate. Davenport also tells Chase, Adam, and Bree that they cannot go to school until he figures out what is going on. Leo, who is already at school, encounters Douglas, who then shows Leo video footage of Krane implanting himself with more bionic abilities. At the lab, Davenport receives a transmission from Krane, who has captured Leo and Tasha. While Chase, Adam, and Bree want to rescue them, Davenport heads out alone with an extremely powerful thermal blaster. Davenport arrives at Krane's lair, but Krane siphons the power from the blaster and quickly beats Davenport. During the battle, Leo and Tasha are trapped in an exothermic energy field to fry them. Afterward, Krane uses a geo-leap ability to travel instantly from his lair to Davenport's lab, where he battles Adam, Bree, and Chase. While Davenport rescues Leo and Tasha, Krane easily beats Chase, Adam, and Bree with his more advanced bionics. Before Krane can finish them off, Douglas arrives and blasts Krane with a laser blaster. After another battle, Krane escapes by geo-leaping out of the lab. Davenport arrives and demands Douglas to leave due to his past behavior, despite him rescuing Adam, Bree, and Chase. Guest stars: Angel Parker as Tasha, Jeremy Kent Jackson as Douglas, Graham Shiels as Krane
53	9	"Three Minus Bree"	Victor Gonzalez	Julia Miranda	June 30, 2014	309	0.44
Bree is accepted for a semester abroad program in Australia, but when Davenport learns about it, he refuses to let her go. When Davenport later refuses to let her go to a concert with her friends in favor of bionic chip maintenance, she decides she has had enough and smashes her bionic chip, much to the horror and shock of the others. Bree initially relishes her new freedom; however, during a mission, Bree feels helpless as Chase, Adam, and Davenport are gone for hours. When they return, Chase reveals that they barely made it out alive and because Bree is no longer bionic, the mission took twice as long. Bree realizes she was selfish and apologizes to Chase and Adam and is ready to become bionic again, but Davenport tells her that since Douglas built the chips, he is not sure if Bree will ever be bionic again. Meanwhile, using technology based on Eddy's smart home system, Leo develops a special pill that attaches to a person's cerebral cortex and diagnoses medical problems. As Tasha is sick, Leo decides to test the pill on her, but Eddy becomes stuck in Tasha's body due to a mistake in which Leo transferred Eddy to the pill. Eddy spends the day dressing Tasha horribly and getting her kicked out of places in town. Later, Davenport uses his nasal vacuum on Eddy and the pill is extracted. However, Eddy reveals he did a news report as Tasha, and much to her shock, he made her look like a complete buffoon. Guest stars: Angel Parker as Tasha, Will Forte as the voice of Eddy
54	10	"Which Father Knows Best?"	Guy Distad	Kenny Byerly	July 7, 2014	310	0.46
As Davenport attempts to repair Bree's damaged chip, the replacement chip keeps malfunctioning, much to Davenport's frustration. Although Leo believes Douglas can help since he was the original creator, Davenport refuses to even see his brother again. Realizing Davenport will not change his mind, Leo finds Douglas, anyway, who reluctantly agrees to help. Meanwhile, Chase and Adam try to find a way to replace Bree's speed on missions. They decide to use Davenport's motorcycle, which Chase alters so it can go up to 400 miles per hour. However, Chase and Adam cannot agree on who will get to drive the motorcycle during missions. While Davenport is away, Douglas creates a new chip as close to the original as possible, and although it seems to work, it also malfunctions by causing Bree to run uncontrollably. Davenport finds Leo with Douglas at the lab, but the brothers work together to stop Bree and fix her chip. After Bree's chip is fixed, Davenport still kicks out Douglas, as he is unable to forgive his brother's past behavior. When Bree apologizes to Davenport for the mistake of breaking her original chip, Davenport realizes everyone deserves a second chance; the next day, Davenport offers his brother a chance to move in with them temporarily, and he accepts. Guest stars: Jeremy Kent Jackson as Douglas, Sandy Martin as Greta
55	11	"Cyborg Shark Attack"	Victor Gonzalez	Greg Schaffer	July 18, 2014	313	N/A
Leo is scared by a shark movie he watched at the theater, but at school when Janelle is upset about somebody screaming during the movie, Leo makes it out to be that it was Chase and Adam who were screaming. This upsets Chase and Adam, who decide to get revenge. Chase alters one of Davenport's cyborg security sharks with hover technology so it will float, and he and Adam unleash it in the house to scare Leo in front of Janelle. However, the shark goes haywire and activates two other cyborg sharks, trapping Chase, Adam, Leo, and Janelle in the house. Later, Leo gathers up his courage and manages to turn the main shark off, which deactivates the others. Meanwhile, Principal Perry enlists Bree and Davenport's help to get into a country club, having them pose as her daughter and husband during an interview. Perry, nervous about the interview, begins telling lies to the interviewer, Regina. After Perry learns that Regina likes pottery, she repeatedly has Bree secretly use her super speed to travel around the world and retrieve pottery, which Perry claims as her own collection. Although Regina is impressed with the collection, she rejects Perry's membership after learning of the lies. Bree and Davenport feel bad for Perry and agree to let her spend the summer with them and the others. Guest stars: Maile Flanagan as Principal Perry, Madison Pettis as Janelle, Margaret Easley as Regina
56	12	"You Posted What!?!"	Victor Gonzalez	Hayes Jackson and Ken Blankstein	July 28, 2014	314–315	1.37
Chase, Adam, and Bree learn that a girl was secretly recording them from behind a bush during a mission from the previous day in which they repaired a ruptured gas pipeline to prevent an explosion. The video, showing the team's bionic abilities, is uploaded to the Internet. Through satellite imaging, Davenport learns of the girl's presence during the mission, but Chase is confused that he did not notice the girl as he thermal scanned the entire area. A swarm of government agents infiltrate the house, while Douglas and Leo escape and go to the school to evade capture. The government team is led by Agent Graham, who heads a secret government division that investigates paranormal phenomena around the world. However, Graham has been the laughingstock of the government for years because none of the phenomena has proven to be real, until the discovery of Adam, Bree, and Chase. Viewing them as weapons of mass destruction, Graham intends to hold Adam, Bree, and Chase indefinitely in separate facilities, while Davenport will be taken away pending Graham's final report of the situation. Krane and the girl arrive at the school and it is then revealed that the mission Chase, Adam, and Bree were on was a setup. Krane reveals that the girl, named S-1, has bionic abilities that include being able to avoid Chase's thermal scan. Krane has also implanted S-1 with his own Triton App, giving him complete control over her. Krane electrocutes Principal Perry and Douglas while S-1 causes a ceiling beam to crush Leo's arm. After Krane and S-1 leave, Douglas and Perry recover and take Leo to a hospital. Tasha later shows up, only to realize that Leo is gone. While Chase, Adam, and Bree are saying their goodbyes, Agent Graham tells them it is time to leave, but Adam refuses and uses his blast wave ability to take the agents down. At the hospital, Adam, Bree, Chase, and Davenport learn from Perry that Krane is responsible for exposing the bionic secret. Meanwhile, at Douglas and Krane's old warehouse, Leo awakens and learns that Douglas has saved his arm using bionic components, after a doctor stated that his old arm could never be used again. Leo's bionic arm includes super strength and the ability to shoot laser spheres. Krane and S-1 show up at the warehouse, followed by Chase, Adam, Bree, and Davenport. Krane and S-1 are eventually defeated in battle. As Agent Graham arrives, Douglas reveals that Krane and S-1 are the bionic villains. Agent Graham is then saved by Bree when Krane tries to attack him. Krane and S-1 are taken into custody and locked in a prison with a bionic signal interrupter, preventing them from using their bionics to get out. Later, Graham holds a press conference with Chase, Adam, and Bree to confirm that they are bionic superhumans. Davenport is upset when he learns that Graham is now in charge of Chase, Adam, and Bree as their mission team leader. It is revealed that Krane has an army of bionic soldiers, which he will use to destroy Chase, Adam, and Bree. Guest stars: Angel Parker as Tasha, Maile Flanagan as Principal Perry, Jeremy Kent Jackson as Douglas, Graham Shiels as Krane, Ben Bodé as Agent Graham, Ashley Argota as S-1 Note: This is a double-length special episode.
57	13	"Armed and Dangerous"	Victor Gonzalez	Julia Miranda	September 29, 2014	318	0.65
Douglas is concerned about Leo's frequent use of his bionic strength around the house, as he is worried how the government may react if it were discovered that Leo is also bionic. Leo promises to limit his use of bionics, but he becomes jealous when Janelle becomes interested in Adam and wants to do a school science fair project on his bionic abilities. Although Leo is supposed to keep his bionic arm a secret, he decides to show off his bionic abilities to Janelle. However, he learns that Douglas remotely deactivated the bionic arm until he becomes fully responsible. Leo reactivates his bionics but accidentally causes a fire at school with his laser spheres. After rescuing Janelle, Douglas learns of what happened and decides to train Leo on how to control his bionics. Meanwhile, Agent Graham takes Chase, Adam, and Bree on a promotional tour around the world. Davenport wants Chase, Adam, and Bree to resume their mission training to maintain their bionics, but they side with Graham, who believes the tour is more important for now. When they miss a mission and people get hurt as a result, Adam, Bree, and Chase tell Graham that they need to resume their training. Although Graham has already received a promotion he wanted, he now intends to continue the press tour for his own fame and profit. When the president of the United States visits the lab to observe the team's bionic abilities, they pretend to have glitches so they can expose Graham as being unqualified to lead them. The president fires Graham and allows Davenport to return as the team's mission leader. Guest stars: Jeremy Kent Jackson as Douglas, Madison Pettis as Janelle, Ben Bodé as Agent Graham, John Eric Bentley as President Note: Adam's pressurized lung capacity from "Brother Battle" is prematurely shown in this episode.
58	14	"Alien Gladiators"	Guy Distad	Ron Rappaport	October 13, 2014	311	N/A
An annual fan convention about a science-fiction film franchise, Alien Gladiators, is being held in Mission Creek this year, and everyone attends it. Chase, Adam, and Bree wait in line to meet Andre Ethier, who is starring in the next Alien Gladiators film, but Caitlin shows up and forces them to let her cut in front of them. Because of high turnout, the line is cut off and Caitlin ends up being the last person to meet Ethier. Chase, Adam, and Bree fight with Caitlin and are thrown in a security holding area with a fanboy named Simon. Meanwhile, Leo and Davenport compete against others in one-on-one battles during the fire staff competition, in which people use lighted staff rods to battle each other, with the prize being a walk-on role in the next Alien Gladiators film. Eventually, Leo and Davenport face off against each other, with Leo prevailing. Leo is surprised to learn that he will be competing against Principal Perry in the final battle. Leo is advised by Davenport on how to win against Perry, and he eventually beats her. However, he decides to let Davenport have the walk-on role. Guest stars: Andre Ethier as himself, Karan Brar as Simon, Maile Flanagan as Principal Perry, Michaela Carrozzo as Caitlin
59	15	"Brother Battle"	Hal Sparks	Jason Dorris	October 20, 2014	312	0.63
Chase feels that it is unfair that he is frequently picked on by Adam, so Douglas suggests giving Chase a new bionic ability as an advantage over Adam, but Davenport opposes the idea. Chase convinces Douglas to secretly unlock a new ability for him: a "laser bow" weapon that resembles a large glow stick. Davenport is upset when he discovers what Douglas has done, and is also concerned how Chase's new ability will affect the team's work on missions. Meanwhile, Bree tells Leo about a contest at Tech Town in which the company's one-millionth customer will win a grand prize to meet Tech Town's founder, Franz Minsk. Leo competes to win the contest in hopes of riding the world's first anti-gravity roller coaster at Minsk's new tech theme park. When Principal Perry learns of Leo's desire to win the contest, she decides to compete against him. Leo makes multiple purchases at Tech Town and eventually becomes the one-millionth customer, but Scott informs him that family members of employees are ineligible to win the prize. As the next customer in line, Perry winds up winning the prize and riding the anti-gravity roller coaster. At the house, Douglas tries to return things to normal by making Adam the strongest again. He gives Adam a new ability, pressurized lung capacity, allowing him to forcefully exhale air. However, Chase and Adam end up fighting each other with their new abilities. Davenport convinces them that they need to start respecting each other, and Douglas agrees not to go against Davenport's orders again. However, Douglas reveals that he has already given Bree the ability to become invisible. Guest stars: Maile Flanagan as Principal Perry, Jeremy Kent Jackson as Douglas, Dustin Ingram as Scott
60	16	"Spike Fright"	Guy Distad	Greg Schaffer	October 24, 2014	319	0.46
Adam becomes jealous when Sabrina, a girl at school, takes an interest in Chase. Sabrina and Chase spend time together at Davenport's house to work on a school chemistry project, until Adam sabotages their date by angering Chase in order to turn him into Spike. When Sabrina is uncomfortable with Spike's tough personality, she leaves. Adam feels bad, so he later explains to Sabrina that he is the reason her date with Chase did not go well. Meanwhile, at school, Bree and Leo overhear Principal Perry arguing with Flo, a school lunch lady. They become convinced that Perry has murdered Flo. That night, Davenport accompanies Bree and Leo to the school. They are surprised to find Perry there, and they become suspicious when she acts paranoid. Ultimately, they learn that they misunderstood the situation and that Perry and Flo are actually planning to open a food truck together. Perry explains that she was paranoid because she and Flo had borrowed 1,600 pounds of cafeteria meat for the food truck. Guest stars: Maile Flanagan as Principal Perry, Ashlee Füss as Sabrina
61	17	"Face-Off"	Guy Distad	Julia Miranda	November 10, 2014	317	0.57
Bree wants to get revenge on Adam for embarrassing her in front of Jake, her boyfriend. Working with Chase, she puts on a cyber cloak that makes her look and sound exactly like Principal Perry and embarrasses Adam in front of the whole school. However, when she shows Adam the cyber cloak right before the school dance that night, it glitches and will not come off. Bree then makes Chase wear a cyber cloak of herself and go to the dance with Jake. Meanwhile, Leo and Douglas snoop in Davenport's briefcase and compete for what they think to be his new vice-president, only to find out it was for the Davenport Industries softball team. Davenport then finds out that he had two cyber cloaks missing and deactivates them from the lab. This embarrasses Chase and gets Bree into trouble with Jake. The next day, Bree thinks she has patched things up with Jake, but it is really Principal Perry wearing a cyber cloak. Guest stars: Maile Flanagan as Principal Perry, Jeremy Kent Jackson as Douglas, Cody Griffin as Jake
62	18	"Merry Glitchmas"	Guy Distad	Ron Rappaport	December 1, 2014	320	0.75
During Christmas, when Chase, Adam, and Bree discover that their new action figures are being outsold by a furry ball toy known as "The Nerble", they attempt to improve their toys by adding real bionic abilities. After adding them, they decide that the toys are too dangerous for children and put them in a box to be destroyed. Meanwhile, Tasha is running a toy drive at the school and collecting gifts. She happens to find the action figures and hands them out. When Chase, Adam, and Bree find out, they rush to the school and try to catch the action figures. After destroying the toy drive, they make it up to Tasha by letting the children have fun with their bionic abilities. At the house, Leo and Davenport have a snowball fight using Davenport's weapons that create and shoot snowballs. When Leo's weapon malfunctions and stops shooting, he decides to use his bionic arm to throw the snowballs, but Grandma Rose shows up just as he does so. Rose gets mad and calls Davenport a bad father for allowing her grandson to be implanted with bionics. Leo defends Davenport, who tries to make it up to Rose by giving her a Bree action figure, but it promptly explodes. Guest stars: Angel Parker as Tasha, Telma Hopkins as Grandma Rose
63	19	"Rise of the Secret Soldiers"	Victor Gonzalez	Hayes Jackson and Chris Peterson & Bryan Moore	January 26, 2015	321–322	1.01
Gossip websites begin publishing false information about the bionic team, so Leo arranges for a live reality television series to document them, allowing people to see the truth. A film crew accompanies them live during a mission in which they attempt to fix a broken electrical transformer. However, it turns into a disaster when Adam, Bree, and Chase fight for screen time and fail to prevent a nationwide power outage, which causes the public to question their responsibility and whether they can be trusted. After the mission, the president orders the team to stay away from the public in order to let him settle things down. However, protesters have gathered outside Davenport's house, demanding that Chase, Adam, and Bree leave Mission Creek. Trying to hold back the protesters, Leo accidentally uses his bionic arm to shoot laser spheres at them, revealing that he too has bionic abilities. As the protesters become more enraged, Adam uses his super breath to blow them off the premises, thereby injuring them in the process. Chase criticizes Adam's actions and Chase, Adam, and Bree start fighting and eventually decide to dissolve the team. Three weeks later, Chase, Adam, and Bree refuse to talk to each other, but they are forced into action when Krane plans to use his own version of the Triton App to control everyone in the world, in addition to the bionic army that is under his control. Leo is made an official member of the team and gets an energy transference upgrade to his bionic arm, allowing him to absorb and give off energy. Davenport and Douglas lead a large battle against Krane and his bionic army at his junkyard hideout, where he plans to use a stolen satellite to globally transmit the Triton App signal. Most of the soldiers attack Adam and Bree, who manage to take them out. Leo battles S-1, while Chase battles a soldier known as S-3, and Davenport is injured by Krane. With time running out before the satellite transmission, Douglas tells Chase, Adam, and Bree that they can perform a risky move in which they fuse their abilities together to stop Krane. They succeed, blasting Krane into the sky and breaking his control over the soldiers. However, their victory is cut short when they learn about Davenport's battle injuries. Following surgery, Davenport remains in delicate condition. Guest stars: Maile Flanagan as Principal Perry, John Eric Bentley as President, Jeremy Kent Jackson as Douglas, Graham Shiels as Krane, Ashley Argota as S-1, Cole Ewing as S-3 Note: This is a double-length special episode.
64	20	"Bionic House Party"	Guy Distad	Mark Brazill	February 2, 2015	323	N/A
Davenport remains in critical condition after the battle with Krane; Leo visits him in the hospital. When Davenport's heart rate drops, Leo saves him by using his energy transference ability to give some of his own energy to Davenport. However, Leo subsequently suffers the side effect of accelerated aging. Meanwhile, Krane's former bionic soldiers, who have been deactivated from the Triton App, have no memory and nowhere to go, so they follow Adam home. Chase, Adam, and Bree hide the soldiers from the authorities in their house because they are not evil anymore. However, the president finds out and tries to have them arrested, considering them a threat due to their bionic abilities. However, he changes his mind after he witnesses the soldiers transferring a minimal amount of their own energy to save Leo, who almost died of old age. Later, Davenport strikes up a deal with the president to have the soldiers trained by Adam, Bree, and Chase to become bionic heroes. The soldiers will be trained at the Davenport Bionic Academy, located on a man-made island accessed by Davenport's hydroloop a high-speed transport system. Guest stars: Angel Parker as Tasha, Cole Ewing as S-3, John Eric Bentley as President, Nicole Pettis as Agent Reed
65	21	"First Day of Bionic Academy"	Guy Distad	Chris Peterson & Bryan Moore	February 3, 2015	324	0.79
Davenport opens the Davenport Bionic Academy. Because Leo has only had his bionic arm for six months, Davenport classifies him as one of the academy students rather than a mentor like Adam, Bree, and Chase. New names are chosen for the students, replacing their soldier numbers. Among the students are Bob, an unintelligent boy who can levitate and has super strength; and Spin, a boy whose bionic ability is spinning at a fast speed. Sebastian, formerly S-3, does not like Chase's strict style of teaching. The students wear outfits with specific colors to indicate their level of experience with their bionics, and Leo is annoyed that Davenport keeps moving Spin up another color level. Out of frustration, Leo uses his bionic arm to punch a hole in a wall. When water begins leaking in, he learns that the island and academy are now sinking because of him. Leo tells Davenport that the leak is Spin's fault, but Leo eventually admits responsibility. Chase, Sebastian and other students with molecularkinesis join together and use the ability to raise the island back onto its foundation. Guest stars: Max Charles as Spin, Brandon Salgado-Telis as Bob, Cole Ewing as Sebastian
66	22	"Adam Steps Up"	Guy Distad	Ernie Bustamante	February 4, 2015	325	1.06
While Davenport and Tasha are celebrating their anniversary in Mission Creek, Adam tells Bob to do all the things he cannot do when Davenport is around. Bob goes ahead and steals Davenport's plane, but he inadvertently deactivates the auto-pilot and Chase, Adam, Bree, and Sebastian work together at the academy to save him. Adam uses Davenport's jet wing to fly up to the plane and save Bob. When Adam tries re-activating the auto-pilot, the plane begins to fall. Adam helps Bob conquer his fear of heights by jumping out of the jet; however, Bob takes Adam's parachute and Adam jumps out to try to get it from him. Adam and Bob fall through the ceiling of Davenport's house as he finishes setting up an anniversary meal. Adam confesses that he was not a good mentor, but Bob tells Davenport that Adam actually was helpful by boosting his confidence. Davenport then says that his plane can land itself even without the auto-pilot. Meanwhile, Leo invites Janelle to the island and tries to impress her by having a bionic battle with Spin, who gets the first attack and knocks Leo over. Leo then fights back and hits Spin in the leg, causing him to cry. Janelle gets upset at Leo and takes Spin to get a smoothie, but Leo learns that Spin faked the injury so Janelle would spend time with him. Leo tries to prove to Janelle that Spin is faking the injury, but he is unsuccessful. Later, Janelle overhears Spin and realizes that Leo was right. Guest stars: Madison Pettis as Janelle, Max Charles as Spin, Brandon Salgado-Telis as Bob, Cole Ewing as Sebastian
67	23	"Unauthorized Mission"	Guy Distad	Ken Blankstein	February 5, 2015	326	0.81
Spin and Bob attempt an unauthorized mission to try to prove themselves; however, they both end up stuck in quicksand and call Leo to save them. After Leo rescues them, Davenport decides to advance Leo's color ranking among the students. Meanwhile, Principal Perry misses Adam, Bree, and Chase. She manages to get onto the island and begs Davenport for a job at the academy as the head of security. Davenport repeatedly sends Perry away from the island, but she keeps finding ways to return. Davenport eventually agrees to give Perry the job position, which upsets Leo as he does not want her around. Meanwhile, Chase and Sebastian work to create a virtual training simulator to help train the many students at the academy. However, Adam destroys the simulator with his recklessness, so Chase and Sebastian create another one. As revenge, they have Adam test out the simulator and make it painful for him. After Chase and Sebastian bond over the simulator project, they have a conversation and Chase reveals to Sebastian how they had to kill his creator, Krane. Later, Sebastian volunteers Davenport to demonstrate the mission simulator. However, Davenport is injured when he powers up the simulator's mainframe, and is then treated for his injury. Davenport and the others are unaware that Sebastian altered the mainframe in an attempt to kill Davenport, as revenge on Chase, Adam, and Bree for what they did to Krane. Guest stars: Maile Flanagan as Perry, Max Charles as Spin, Brandon Salgado-Telis as Bob, Cole Ewing as Sebastian

=== Season 4: Bionic Island (2015–16) ===
No. overall	No. in season	Title	Directed by	Written by	Original release date	Prod. code	U.S. viewers (millions)
68	1	"Bionic Rebellion"	Guy Distad	Chris Peterson & Bryan Moore and Mark Brazill	March 18, 2015	403–404	0.86
After forming a friendship, Chase secretly helps Sebastian unlock a new bionic ability, unaware of Sebastian's plan to kill Davenport. When weapons disappear from the academy, Perry becomes concerned and suspects that Sebastian took them, but no one believes her. Perry and Davenport become trapped on the hydro-loop when it stops on the way to the mainland, leaving them stranded with limited oxygen. When they realize something is wrong, Adam, Bree, and Chase put the island on lock down, trapping Leo, Bob, Spin, and others in the training room. Adam, Bree, and Chase learn that Sebastian has formed an evil alliance with two other students; that he has given himself all of the available bionic abilities; and that he was responsible for stopping the hydro-loop, in order to kill Davenport as revenge for Krane's death. After revealing to the trapped students what happened to their creator, Sebastian and his allies convince the students to join his bionic rebellion against Adam, Bree, Chase, and Leo. However, Leo convinces Bob and Spin to help him escape the training room. Adam, Bree, Chase, and Leo battle against Sebastian and his two allies, eventually defeating them. Davenport and Perry escape the hydro-loop and return to the academy. Davenport successfully convinces the students that he was protecting them by keeping their past a secret until the time was right, just as he had done previously with Adam, Bree, and Chase with regard to their father Douglas. Guest stars: Maile Flanagan as Perry, Max Charles as Spin, Brandon Salgado-Telis as Bob, Cole Ewing as Sebastian, Marissa Cuevas as Lexi Note: This is a double-length special episode.
69	2	"Left Behind"	Hal Sparks	Julia Miranda	March 25, 2015	401	0.64
Feeling they deserve to experience the world, Chase, Adam, and Bree sneak out Spin, Bob, and several other bionic students off to a food joint on the mainland, leaving Leo to cover for them. However, upon their return, they discover that they have left Spin and Bob behind. Meanwhile, Leo is wearing his mission suit without having a mission to go on, and when Davenport learns that it is because it makes Leo feel important, his ego gets the best of him and he puts on Chase's mission suit. However, it goes awry when Chase's mission suit becomes stuck on Davenport and he and Leo try all sorts of ways to get it off to no avail. Back at the food joint, bank robbers who just heisted a bank and are cornered by the police use the restaurant as a hiding place. When they discover that Spin and Bob are inside, they try to use them as hostages, but Spin and Bob manage to subdue them with their bionics just as Chase, Adam, and Bree show up to rescue them. Shortly after, Leo and Davenport show up, and Davenport, wearing his snowsuit, is upset at Chase, Adam, and Bree for sneaking the bionic students out. However, Bree becomes suspicious of his snowsuit and uses her super speed to blow it off, uncovering that he is still in Chase's mission suit, which upsets Chase. Guest stars: Max Charles as Spin, Brandon Salgado-Telis as Bob
70	3	"Under Siege"	Victor Gonzalez	Ken Blankstein	April 1, 2015	402	0.66
Chase, Adam, Bree, and Leo discover the living quarters in a mess and immediately suspect Kerry Perry, who is visiting the academy. Later, during the night, Perry is attacked by a mysterious attacker; in the morning, Chase notices bionic burn marks on the hydro-loop and has suspicions that there is still a rebel among them from when Sebastian led the bionic rebellion. The next night, everyone is on the lookout for anyone suspicious when they start hearing explosions after losing contact with Leo. Shortly after, Douglas is attacked by the mysterious bionic attacker and the others come to his rescue. As more explosions take place, Perry stays behind with Douglas while Chase, Adam, and Bree continue the search. They find Leo, who appears to be in a trance, and learn that it is Leo who has been on a rampage. Douglas and Perry show up, and Douglas explains that Leo has been sleepwalking because his bionics have been glitching since he never got a capsule to keep his bionic arm under control. Later, Douglas creates a small capsule for Leo's arm to put an end to his bionics glitching. Guest stars: Maile Flanagan as Perry, Jeremy Kent Jackson as Douglas, Grace Kaufman as Kerry Perry Absent: Hal Sparks as Davenport
71	4	"Bionic Dog"	Guy Distad	Mark Brazill	April 8, 2015	412	0.79
Adam brings a dog back to the island and Douglas reveals that it is Otis, his old dog who lived with him and Krane. Douglas made Otis bionic to save his life when he was injured. Chase turns out to be allergic to dogs as he starts sneezing, so Douglas says that Otis has to leave, but he and Adam actually hide the dog. Meanwhile, Bree becomes concerned when Leo falls in love with his new smartphone application assistant, Shelly. When Leo leaves, Bree tries to delete Shelley, but accidentally changes the settings from Shelley to Liam and is soon seduced by him. Leo is upset when he learns of what Bree did. Elsewhere, Chase and Douglas learn that Krane had Otis reprogrammed to kill Douglas after he betrayed Krane. Chase learns that in addition to heat vision and super strength, Otis also has an Override App. Otis uses the app to control Adam and make him act like a dog, to help fulfill the mission of killing Douglas. Eventually, Douglas manages to extract the bionic chip from Otis, and later finds a new home for him. Before Otis leaves, Bree and Leo are still fighting about the phone and accidentally drop it; they lose interest after Otis pees on it. Guest star: Jeremy Kent Jackson as Douglas Absent: Hal Sparks as Davenport
72	5	"Mission Mania"	Jody Margolin Hahn	Hayes Jackson	April 15, 2015	405	0.59
Although Leo is part of the bionic team, he is upset about the lack of recognition he gets from the public. Later, Chase, Adam, and Bree are upset and overwhelmed by a sudden influx of missions, many of which turn out not to be emergencies. They learn that Leo, attempting to gain recognition, has started a bionic rescue service called Leo Dooley's Bionic Superhumans. Meanwhile, Douglas is put in charge of developing new technology for the academy. However, his inventions wind up being dangerous to the students, due to his lack of experience with trying to help people rather than harm them. Among his ideas is a lie-detecting chair that rapidly spins a person around if they tell a lie. Getting mission alerts from all over the country, Chase decides not to go because at least half of the alerts are not emergencies. Leo feels he needs to fulfill his promises and save people, so he goes on a mission alone. Arriving at the mission site, Leo finds a helicopter full of people that is about to fall over the side of a building. Using his super strength, he tries to pull the helicopter back down, but it is too heavy. Adam, Bree, and Chase eventually arrive to help Leo and rescue the helicopter occupants. When Bree gets stuck in the helicopter, Leo rescues her before it goes over the building. He then realizes that missions are about saving lives rather than gaining fame. Later, Douglas uses the technology from the lie-detecting chair to tell if the mission alerts are real or not. Guest stars: Jeremy Kent Jackson as Douglas, Max Charles as Spin, Brandon Salgado-Telis as Bob Absent: Hal Sparks as Davenport
73	6	"Simulation Manipulation"	Victor Gonzalez	Greg Schaffer	April 22, 2015	406	0.50
Chase and Adam each lead their own student groups against each other in Davenport's series of simulated exercises that will evaluate both student and mentor performance. However, after Chase's group fails at defeating the exoskeleton suit and defusing a virtual bomb, Chase decides to find a way to cheat and win. He tries to use his Override App to make his group do whatever he is thinking. However, it malfunctions and they mirror what Chase does instead. With no time to fix it, the third test starts. The test is a virtual maze that the students must do alone. While watching the students' progress on the screen, Chase mimics the maze, claiming it is his good luck dance. Chase's team wins, but Adam exposes Chase's cheating. Davenport disciplines Chase by having Adam take control of Chase through the Override App, which Adam uses to make Chase hurt himself. Meanwhile, Leo, who lives in the mentors' quarters with Adam, Bree and Chase, wakes up to find the area a mess. After cleaning up for six hours, he blames Chase and Adam. However, when he finds the quarters a mess again, he looks at the security footage and realizes that Bree is making the mess. Bree says that she just wanted to let loose because she had some freedom. Much to Davenport's dismay, they decide to use the exoskeleton as their cleaner.
74	7	"Forbidden Hero"	Victor Gonzalez	Steve Joe	July 1, 2015	408	0.33
Tasha visits the island after finding out that Leo's ankle was hurt on a mission. She later finds out that Leo has also accompanied Adam, Bree and Chase on missions. She later pulls Leo out of the team after he disobeys her when she does not allow him on a mission due to him lying about his broken ankle. Meanwhile, Bree becomes jealous when Caitlin arrives in the island and Bob become overly attached to her. Leo creates a fake training exercise to prove to Tasha that he is capable. When a category 5 storm hits the island, Tasha becomes convinced that it is another one of Leo's charades. When she is caught in the wind, Leo is forced to rescue her from being blown out to sea. She later lets him stay at the academy after he rescues her. Guest stars: Angel Parker as Tasha, Brandon Salgado-Telis as Bob, Michaela Carrozzo as Caitlin Absent: Hal Sparks as Davenport
75	8	"Spider Island"	Hal Sparks	Julia Miranda	July 8, 2015	409	0.50
Adam discovers a fossilized prehistoric sea spider, and Chase and Douglas decide to bring it back to life, but Leo feels left out when they do not let him help, as he is not knowledgeable about biology. After the spider is created, Leo secretly opens the cage to look at it, but he fails to completely shut the cage. The spider escapes and bites Adam, which poisons him. To create an antidote, the others must retrieve venom from the spider, so they begin a search for it. To give the spider an advantage to avoid going extinct again, Douglas gave it growth hormones, despite Chase's opposition to the idea. The group is surprised when they discover that the spider has grown to 50 feet tall. Bree punctures the spider's venom sack with a harpoon and Douglas retrieves the venom. The spider topples over into the ocean, and Adam is later cured. Guest star: Jeremy Kent Jackson as Douglas Absent: Hal Sparks as Davenport
76	9	"Spike vs. Spikette"	Victor Gonzalez	Jason Dorris	July 15, 2015	407	0.69
Douglas finds out that there is a student named Kate with the Commando App. Chase tries to activate her Commando App, named Spikette by Douglas, so he can research her. However, Chase's attempts to aggravate Kate and trigger the Commando App are unsuccessful. When he starts fighting with Adam, she activates her Commando App and thinks Chase is her baby. Chase realizes that her Commando App is triggered by a maternal instinct to protect him. When Spikette becomes destructive, Bree forces Chase to activate his Commando App and become Spike by embarrassing him, so he and Spikette can battle. However, he instead teams up with Spikette and declines to fight her because she is a woman. Meanwhile, Adam and Leo send out a drone to pick up a pizza from the mainland, but it also brings back a young boy named Reggie, who grabbed hold of the device. Reggie initially refuses to leave until he meets Spikette, who tries to take care of him. Douglas gives Bree a Commando App and she and Spikette begin battling each other. Bree wins and Douglas extracts Kate's chip. Chase apologizes to Kate and finds out that Douglas replaced her Commando App with sonic screaming. Guest stars: Jeremy Kent Jackson as Douglas, Liana Ramirez as Kate, Mar Mar as Reggie Absent: Hal Sparks as Davenport
77	10	"Lab Rats vs. Mighty Med"	Rich Correll	Teleplay by : Mark Brazill and Vincent Brown; Story by : Clayton Sakoda & Ian Weinreich	July 22, 2015	415	1.07
Chase and Davenport have invented a new technology, an energy transponder, that takes in energy from any environment. Chase feels that he does not get his share of spotlight when Davenport sells the product without his approval. Meanwhile, superhero doctors Kaz and Oliver come to the bionic academy, with Kaz hoping to gain superhero powers. Chase decides to make a deal with another company when its CEO comes to buy the transponder. The person turns out to be a villain called the Incapacitator, who steals the product for his own use to become the most powerful person in the world. Chase, Adam, Bree, and Leo find out that Kaz and Oliver are not bionic students. Then Tecton, Gamma Girl, and Grey Granite arrive when they find out that the Incapacitator is there. Chase, Adam, Bree, and Leo later find out that Kaz, Oliver, and the others are real superheroes. In the mentors' quarters, the Incapacitator blasts and injures Chase, making him unconscious. Adam, Bree, Leo, Kaz, and Oliver take Chase to the Mighty Med superhero hospital for treatment. Kaz partially switches brains with Chase to use his intellect and figure out how to treat him. Chase's injury has created a hardware virus in his bionic chip, causing the chip to generate plutonic energy. He is stable for now, but if his blood pressure gets too high, he will explode. Meanwhile, the others go to find the Incapacitator, and Skylar tries to get in the middle of the romance that Bree and Oliver form. The team finds the Incapacitator at the Eiffel Tower in Las Vegas, where Kaz and Chase rejoin them. Kaz tricks the Incapacitator to absorb Chase's virus and the Incapacitator explodes. Chase and Kaz switch brains back and Bree stops liking Oliver after she realizes that he resembles Chase. Adam, Bree, Chase, and Leo then depart from Mighty Med to go back home. Starring: Bradley Steven Perry, Jake Short, Paris Berelc Guest stars: Jilon Vanover as Tecton, Damion Poitier as Incapacitator, Carlos Lacámara as Horace Note: This is a combined double-length special episode for both Lab Rats and Mighty Med.
78	11	"Space Elevator"	Hal Sparks	Jonah Kuehner	July 29, 2015	414	0.64
Davenport assigns his top scientist, Dr. Ryan, to work on the world's first space elevator, which travels along a tether and can bring occupants up to space stations. Chase has been working on the space elevator project for years, and is upset at Davenport's decision to hand it off to someone else while Chase serves as a mentor to the academy students. Davenport decides to assign Chase as Dr. Ryan's assistant, which further upsets Chase, as he believes he should be in charge. Dr. Ryan and Chase annoy each other by trying to prove their intellect to one another. The day of the launch, Chase performs a bionic scan of the elevator and finds a major flaw on the elevator's braking system. Chase decides to keep it a secret so that when the elevator test fails, Dr. Ryan will be removed from the project. However, Davenport decides not to use the test dummy and says that he should test out the space elevator himself. After failing to stop Davenport, Chase informs Dr. Ryan of the flaw and the two of them work together to safely get Davenport back on the ground. Working together, they reverse the polarity of the magnets that propel the elevator and it begins coming down ten times as fast. Leo uses his bionic strength to stop the elevator from hitting the ground, but he then realizes that Davenport already used a parachute to escape. When Leo tries to escape from holding the elevator, it drops and crushes his leg. Because of the extensive injury, Davenport gives Leo a bionic leg. Guest stars: Maile Flanagan as Perry, Brandon Salgado-Telis as Bob, Mark Saul as Dr. Ryan
79	12	"Bionic Action Hero"	Victor Gonzalez	Hayes Jackson and Ken Blankstein	August 5, 2015	410–411	0.97
Douglas tells Adam, Bree and Chase that his ex-girlfriend from college, now a film director named Giselle, will be making a film titled Bionic Action Hero" based on them and starring an up-and-coming actor named Troy West. Troy and Giselle visit the island to learn about the bionic team, and Bree immediately falls for Troy. Giselle is intrigued when Douglas mentions Marcus, saying he was his greatest invention who had the combined abilities of Chase, Adam, and Bree. In the mentors' quarters, Troy explains to Bree that for the film, he needs to figure out how Chase's abilities work or Giselle will fire him. Bree downloads the information about Chase's bionic chip and gives it to Troy. He secretly gives the information to Giselle, who conspires to eliminate the team and start her own race of genetically modified androids. At the movie studio, Bree learns about Giselle and Troy's plan. During filming, Bree stops Troy before he can fire a blaster gun at Chase, Adam, Leo, and Douglas. Bree explains to everyone that Giselle only lured them to the set to kill them. Giselle then explains to them that she planned to unveil her androids until Chase, Adam, and Bree became publicly known as bionic humans, which would steal attention from her androids. Giselle also reveals that all of her film crew members are androids, including Troy. With Chase's schematics, she plans to give all of them super intelligence. However, Bree and her team have Giselle's laptop with the schematics, and Chase and Douglas unleash a virus on Giselle's computer servers to destroy her back-up copies. During a battle between the androids and the others, Troy knocks Chase unconscious and carries him away, with Giselle planning to rip out his bionic chip to learn how to implement his intelligence in the androids. The film set has been rigged to explode, but Adam, Bree, Leo, and Douglas escape. In Giselle's lab, she tells Chase that Troy is an old android model and that she has created a newer version capable of taking any appearance. Upon learning of Chase's location, Adam and Bree go to rescue him. Meanwhile, an android attacks the academy, and Leo and Douglas stay behind to stop it. At the lab, Adam and Bree fight Troy while an android tries to rip out Chase's chip. After knocking out Troy and Giselle, Adam and Bree race to Chase's side, but are too late. Giselle shows up and mockingly apologizes, but Chase appears and reveals that he is alive, while the deceased version is an android replica that he put in place to fool Giselle. She unleashes more androids, but Leo and Douglas arrive and quickly destroy them. Troy awakens and double-crosses Giselle because she was planning to replace him with a newer android model. With her out of the way, he plans on not only destroying bionic humans, but also all humans. He knocks out Giselle and takes Bree hostage, but she manages to dunk him into a sink of water, which short-circuits him. Giselle manages to escape and later retrieves the remains of Marcus from the rubble of Douglas' old lair. Special guest star: Leo Howard as Troy West Guest stars: Jeremy Kent Jackson as Douglas, Jessalyn Wanlim as Giselle Absent: Hal Sparks as Davenport Note: This is a double-length special episode.
80	13	"One of Us"	Guy Distad	Julia Miranda	August 12, 2015	416	0.58
While Leo is in Mission Creek to see Janelle, S-1 arrives unexpectedly at the academy. Like the other students, her memory is blank, but she has been having headaches as well as flashbacks of Krane. Chase and Douglas agree to help her, and they learn that she has a doomsday virus in her because she was under the influence of Krane's Triton App. Chase realizes that he, Adam, Bree, and the students also have Krane's doomsday virus implanted in them. Chase and Douglas try to find a way to save everyone before they die; they believe that the solution to the virus is somewhere in S-1's memories. Leo returns to the island and attacks S-1 upon seeing her, thinking she is still a threat. He knocks her unconscious, inadvertently putting the others' lives in jeopardy. Meanwhile, before they die, Adam and Bree plan to do things they never got to do before. Adam wants to break the world record for blowing the most balloons with his pressurized lung capacity ability, while Bree wants to have a party with all of her friends from Mission Creek. Bree realizes she made a typo in her party invitation, which makes her friends think she is having a party without them because she does not like them. To cheer Bree up, Adam invites random strangers from the pier to attend her party. Bree still wants her friends to come, but she is glad to know she has a brother who cares. When S-1 awakens, Chase and Douglas try to have her remember anything that could end the virus, but their plan is unsuccessful. Chase devises a new plan to have the infected people briefly die through his own doomsday virus, allowing Krane's virus to be stopped. Douglas then uninstalls Chase's virus in time to revive them. Afterwards, Leo and Taylor become friends. Guest stars: Jeremy Kent Jackson as Douglas, Ashley Argota as S-1 Absent: Hal Sparks as Davenport
81	14	"Bob Zombie"	Guy Distad	Hayes Jackson	September 30, 2015	417	0.46
Douglas creates a device that makes any bionic human as smart as Chase. Douglas tests it on Bob, who then starts spending time with Chase, which upsets Adam as he and Bob no longer share the same interests. Douglas gives the super intelligence to the rest of the students, but when Adam tries restoring Bob to his former self, he accidentally gives all the students the intelligence of farm animals, reducing them to mindless zombies who aimlessly wander around. Douglas eventually restores the students to their original selves and is convinced that it is best not to increase their intelligence, as doing so also alters their personalities and interests. Meanwhile, Perry learns that the island was never registered as a country, so she registers it as her own island nation known as Perryland, with her as dictator. To regain the island, the group arranges a wedding between Perry and her crush Douglas. Leo has Perry sign a marriage license, but it actually turns out to be a paper relinquishing ownership back to the Davenports. Guest stars: Maile Flanagan as Perry, Jeremy Kent Jackson as Douglas, Brandon Salgado-Telis as Bob Absent: Hal Sparks as Davenport
82	15	"Human Eddy"	Victor Gonzalez	Greg Schaffer	October 14, 2015	419	0.38
Perry is overworked as head of security for the island, so Davenport gives her a partner by installing Eddy into a synthetic human body to help her. Davenport has replaced Eddy's disrespectful personality to make him nicer. However, Perry does not like the new Eddy and restores his old personality, after which he attempts to harm the students. Leo and Bree inform Davenport about Eddy's personality change, but he initially thinks that they are lying. Davenport later learns the truth, and Perry and Eddy battle each other, with her eventually using a weapon to blow his new body apart. Eddy is then restored to his former location on a wall monitor. Meanwhile, Chase is eligible to receive a job on an environmental task force committee, but first must have an interview with the U.S. president, who comes to the island with the committee members to conduct the interview. The president and his team become bored by Chase's intellect and decide to give Adam a chance to get the job instead. However, they soon realize that Chase is the best person for the job. Chase decides to give up the job after Adam reveals that he would miss Chase and did not want him to leave. Chase realizes that he already has his dream job at the academy. Special guest star: Will Forte as Eddy Guest stars: Maile Flanagan as Perry, John Eric Bentley as President
83	16	"The Curse of the Screaming Skull"	Victor Gonzalez	Loni Steele Sosthand	October 21, 2015	420	0.50
While Davenport takes the students to the Davenport Birthplace Museum, Bob stays behind and Adam teaches him about Halloween. Meanwhile, despite Douglas' objection, Perry visits a nearby island full of dangerous wildlife to search for things with her metal detector. Leo, Bree, and Chase go with her. Perry discovers a metal skull and secretly brings it back to the academy, despite Bree and Chase's earlier demands that she put it back where she found it. Perry tries to sell the skull online, but when the others see it, Chase decides to take it back to the other island. Bree, Leo and Perry experience several near-fatal accidents and become convinced that the skull has cursed them. They subsequently learn that the accidents were caused by Chase, who has become evil from the skull. Bree takes the skull back to the other island. Douglas returns to the academy and learns of the situation, explaining that Chase has actually become infected with a virus that affects anyone who touches the skull. He says that he previously used the skull as a paperweight until he spilled a virus on it and eventually decided to bury it on the other island. Perry was not infected because she was wearing gloves. Bree returns to the island with the infection and tries to harm the others along with Chase. Leo realizes they can inject Davenport's nanobots to remove the virus from Chase and Bree. Adam pretends to be infected with the virus so he can get close enough to inject Chase and Bree, thereby curing them. Guest stars: Maile Flanagan as Perry, Jeremy Kent Jackson as Douglas, Brandon Salgado-Telis as Bob Absent: Hal Sparks as Davenport
84	17	"Lab Rats: On the Edge"	Victor Gonzalez	Hayes Jackson & Greg Schaffer	November 11, 2015	421–422	0.61
Davenport tells the group that the president has decided to host an award ceremony because they have completed their one-thousandth mission. Although Leo has not gone on all of the missions, he wants recognition, but is upset to learn that the ceremony is only for Adam, Bree and Chase. Disappointed, Leo forms his own team with S-1, who calls herself Taylor now, and a student named Logan. Leo demonstrates to Chase, Adam, and Bree that he and Taylor can fuse their laser sphere abilities together to form an electromagnetic pulse attack capable of taking out any power source. Chase demands they stop the demonstration when Taylor becomes overwhelmed by their power, but Leo pushes on, hoping to impress the others. The resulting blast becomes too much for Taylor and it incapacitates her. Although she recovers, the blast has left her permanently blind. Feeling guilty for what he has done, Leo quits the academy and moves back to Mission Creek to live with Tasha. Meanwhile, Davenport has the chance to build an indestructible limo for the president. Douglas and Adam help to perfect the limo design for maximum safety against any threat. Douglas has also invented a gadget that allows Taylor to echo-locate to detect obstacles in her way, and she has continued her training. Later, the Davenports are in the limo on the mainland, heading for the awards ceremony. They go over a large bridge that begins to collapse after a transport ship crashes into it. As the limo dangles over the edge of the bridge, it locks down due to its design, thereby trapping everyone inside. Taylor and Logan learn of the bridge disaster and send the other students out to rescue people on the bridge, marking their first mission. Taylor and Logan also ask Leo to help out; he agrees and is surprised to learn that Taylor is not upset with him following the accident that blinded her. On the bridge, Leo and Taylor, with help from Logan, use their electromagnetic pulse attack to disable the limo's lockdown feature, allowing the others to escape through the sunroof. Everyone escapes except for Chase, who has difficulty getting out. Leo tells the others to evacuate while he rescues Chase. Later, Davenport decides to make Leo a mentor because he has proven to be a leader. Guest stars: Jeremy Kent Jackson as Douglas, Ashley Argota as Taylor, John Eric Bentley as President, Emery Kelly as Logan Note: This is a double-length special episode.
85	18	"Ultimate Tailgate Challenge"	Guy Distad	Greg Schaffer	December 2, 2015	413	0.40
Tasha arrives on the island, informing everyone that she has tickets to a big football game in Mission Creek. Perry then arrives, stating that she has been trying to get a ticket for weeks, but the game has been sold out. Tasha lies when Perry asks her if she has any tickets. At the football stadium prior to the game, Perry learns the truth and becomes furious. Perry acquires and destroys the tickets, so Leo, Davenport, and Tasha compete against her to win new tickets in the ultimate tailgate challenge, an event hosted by Super Bowl champion Willie McGinest, who judges the food prepared by teams from their vehicles. Meanwhile, Bree hangs out with college students outside the stadium and uses her bionics to impress them. However, Chase tells her not to do so, believing that she is being shallow. Later, he ends up using his own bionics to impress the college students, making Bree upset and jealous. On the island, Adam and Bob create a web show about breaking stuff, but they accidentally destroy the capsules while using their super strength to play catch with a coffee table. They eventually fix the capsules, but are later caught. Guest stars: Angel Parker as Tasha, Maile Flanagan as Perry, Brandon Salgado-Telis as Bob, Willie McGinest as Willie McGinest
86	19	"And Then There Were Four"	Victor Gonzalez	Ken Blankstein	January 13, 2016	418	0.41
Douglas reveals that there is a fourth bionic child named Daniel, who is the sibling to Adam, Bree, and Chase. Douglas says Daniel has been living a normal life with an adopted family, but that he has just discovered Douglas as his father and now wants to meet. Daniel is unaware that he is bionic, as his abilities have never been activated due to him not having a capsule. Douglas agrees to let Daniel visit the academy, but he lies to Daniel by claiming that Chase, Adam, Bree, and Leo are his cousins and Davenport is his uncle, in order to keep Daniel's bionics a secret from himself. Daniel initially bonds with Douglas, but his bionics are inadvertently activated later on after he poses for a picture in one of the capsules. When Davenport and Douglas learn that Daniel's bionics have been activated, they tell Daniel the truth. Douglas tells Daniel that he has the ability to replicate any bionic ability by touching another bionic person. Daniel also finds out that his cousins are actually his biologic siblings. Filled with anger at Douglas' lying, Daniel goes out for air on the beach, where he and Leo have a conversation about Douglas. Later, Daniel, using Leo's abilities, accidentally causes a leak in the hydro-loop's fuel tank, which threatens to blow up the island. Adam uses his increased lung capacity to freeze the tank, but is unsuccessful, so Daniel replicates his ability and they team up. After freezing the tank, Douglas apologizes to Daniel for lying and Daniel decides to give Douglas a second chance. Guest stars: Jeremy Kent Jackson as Douglas, Pearce Joza as Daniel
87	20	"Space Colony"	Victor Gonzalez	Chris Peterson & Bryan Moore	January 20, 2016	424–425	0.64
Davenport brings Tasha and the rest of the family to Davenportia, his new domed space colony located on a planet he discovered. Upon arriving, they learn that Perry has been living at Davenportia after she snuck in as one of the colonists. When Davenportia loses contact with Earth, Chase, Adam and Bree head out in a ship to fix the communication satellite. In space, Chase realizes the satellite is fine and that someone disrupted communications from within Davenportia. As Chase heads back to the ship, his jet pack malfunctions and drifts him off into space. Perry, who snuck aboard the ship, takes control and lands the crew on a deserted planet, where they rescue Chase. Meanwhile, at Davenportia, a punctured hole in the dome begins sucking out the colony's oxygen; Leo and Davenport work together to seal the hole, and Perry and the others return afterwards. Krane emerges and reveals himself as the cause of Davenportia's problems. After the attack that was thought to have killed him, Krane has been forced to wear a special mask that helps him breathe. With the aid of his new partner Dr. Gao, Krane intends to implant liquid bionics into the colonists and turn them into his bionic army. Davenport, Tasha, and the colonists are placed under mind control through the Triton App. Chase, Adam, Bree and Leo battle Dr. Gao, who is also bionic. Leo destroys Gao's liquid bionics and Bree removes Krane's mask, while Gao manages to escape. Leo shoots a hole in the dome to destroy Davenportia and foil the bionic army plans. Leo and the others lead Davenport, Tasha and the colonists to safety aboard the ship, and Davenportia collapses following their departure. It is discovered that Gao snuck on board and placed Leo under his control through the Triton App. Gao explains that he has launched a doomsday missile to wipe out human existence on Earth, as part of a plan to replace the population with a bionic civilization by injecting the colonists with the remainder of the liquid bionics. Adam, Bree and Chase battle Gao and Leo, eventually prevailing over them, although the missile remains on track to strike Earth. Krane has escaped the dome in a space pod and begins attacking the ship, until his pod is destroyed by one of the ship's missiles. Adam then puts on a high velocity escape suit and launches himself into Gao's missile, destroying it. Guest stars: Maile Flanagan as Perry, Angel Parker as Tasha, Graham Shiels as Krane, Ping Wu as Dr. Gao Note: This is a double-length special episode.
88	21	"The Vanishing Part 1"	Victor Gonzalez	Chris Peterson & Bryan Moore	February 3, 2016	423	0.68
Davenport and Douglas reveal that they have built an operating system upgrade for all the students' bionics. However, the upgrade does not work on Chase, Adam, and Bree because their bionic infrastructure is older, therefore leaving them at their current level while all the students are now much more powerful. Meanwhile, Daniel is brought to the academy because he had been using his bionics in public. Douglas decides to enroll Daniel at the academy with Leo as his mentor. Leo steadily tries to teach Daniel, but Daniel proves to be unteachable. Douglas rejects Leo's suggestion to give Daniel the upgrade, as Douglas wants Daniel to become responsible for his bionics, but Leo goes against Douglas. The students start to vanish from the academy, including Daniel. The students learn that Giselle has hacked into their chips and geo-leaped them into her chamber that blocks their bionic abilities. She plans to kill all bionic people and replace them with her androids, but she is upset to see that Adam, Bree and Chase are still at the academy. Later, Daniel sends a video message to the island, requesting help. Chase, Adam, Bree, Leo, Davenport, and Douglas go to rescue the students. Daniel leads them into Giselle's lab, but the doors immediately lock. Giselle comes out and shows them that the students are trapped in the chamber, including Daniel, while the Daniel who brought them into the lab reveals himself to be Marcus. Guest stars: Jeremy Kent Jackson as Douglas, Mateus Ward as Marcus, Brandon Salgado-Telis as Bob, Jessalyn Wanlim as Giselle, Pearce Joza as Daniel
89	22	"The Vanishing Part 2"	Victor Gonzalez	Chris Peterson & Bryan Moore	February 3, 2016	426	0.71
Giselle reveals she dug up Marcus from Douglas' old lair and rebuilt him, piece by piece. Marcus wants revenge on Douglas for leaving him to die. Marcus knocks everyone unconscious. Davenport and Douglas are tied together in chairs, while Chase, Adam, Bree, and Leo are put in the chamber with the students, while Daniel is pulled out. Giselle's chamber burns out the chips of Chase, Adam, Bree and the students, destroying their bionic abilities. Because Leo does not have a bionic chip, he is able to break everyone out. Giselle attempts to use her electric whip to destroy Chase, Adam, and Bree, but her attack misses and instead cuts her in pieces. Meanwhile, Marcus tortures Daniel in front of Douglas, and after Douglas' failed attempts to turn Marcus to their side, Daniel replicates Marcus' bionics to blow Marcus up. The team returns to Davenport's lab in Mission Creek to restore the bionic chips. Davenport and Douglas reveal that they have created one universal bionic super chip, so they would all get the upgrade. Douglas also reveals that he brought Marcus' parts from Giselle's lab, and he expresses his desire to rebuild Marcus and reprogram him to be good, but everyone disapproves. Tasha reveals that she is pregnant with a girl. Perry shows up and reveals her relief that everyone is okay. While everyone else leaves the lab, Leo stays behind and notices that Marcus has regenerated himself. Douglas shows up and melts Marcus with a weapon. Later, as Chase, Adam, Bree, and Leo are packing to go back to the academy, Davenport tells them that he is splitting them up. It is decided that Chase and Bree will stay with Davenport to work on a new team project, while Adam and Leo will go back to the academy. When Adam and Leo leave, Davenport asks Chase and Bree if they are ready to start their new adventure. Guest stars: Maile Flanagan as Perry, Angel Parker as Tasha, Jeremy Kent Jackson as Douglas, Mateus Ward as Marcus, Brandon Salgado-Telis as Bob, Jessalyn Wanlim as Giselle, Pearce Joza as Daniel

== See also ==
- List of Lab Rats characters
