= Ashley Argota =

American actress and singer

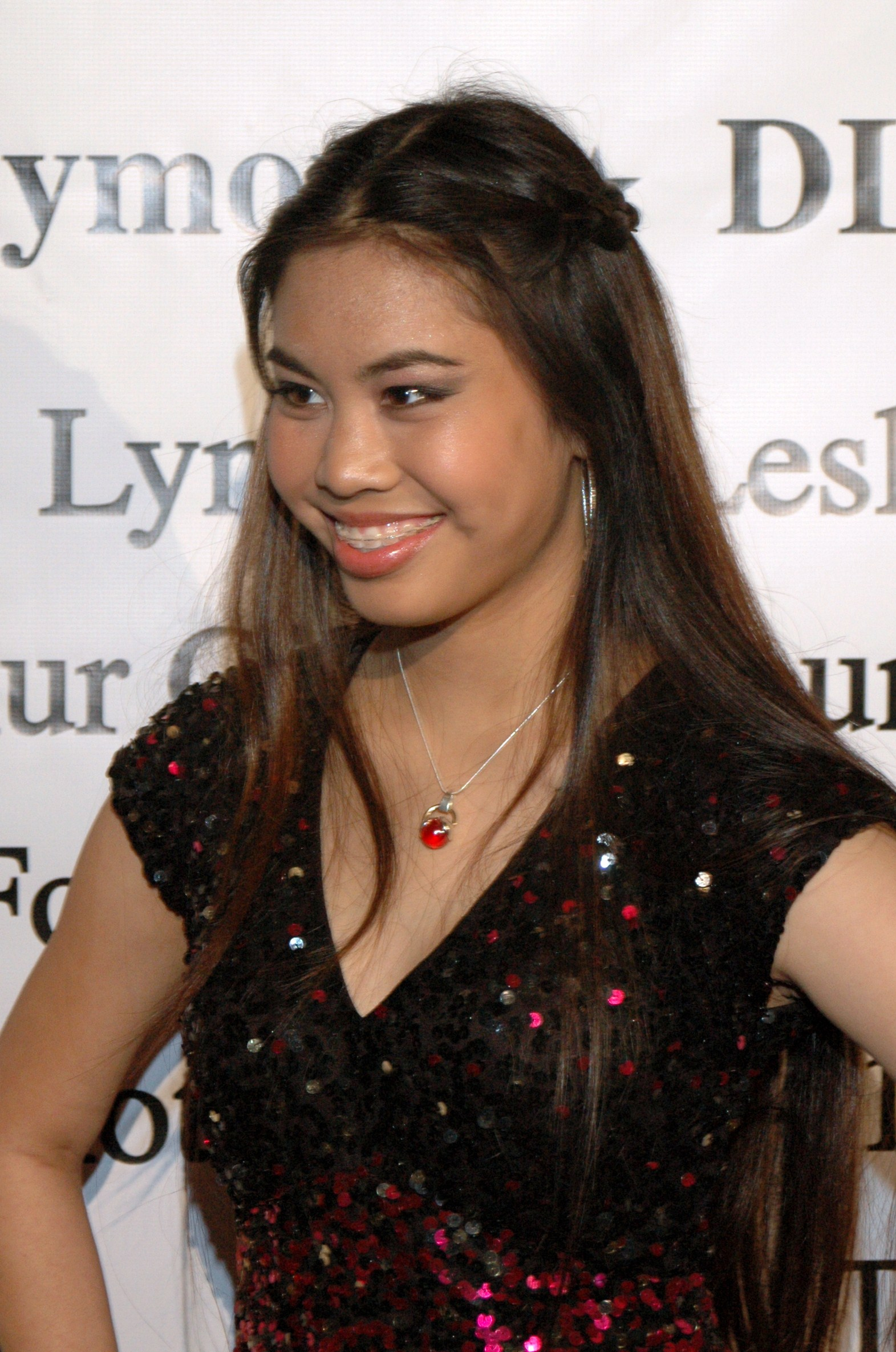
- Argota in 2009
- Born: Ashley Spencer Argota; January 9, 1993 (age 33); Redlands, California, U.S.
- Occupations: Actress; singer
- Years active: 2006–present
- Spouse: Mick Torres (m. 2021)
- Children: 1

Ashley Spencer Argota (born January 9, 1993) is an American actress and singer. She is known for her roles on television, such as Lulu on the Nickelodeon sitcom True Jackson, VP, and Kelly on the Nickelodeon sitcom Bucket & Skinner's Epic Adventures.

== Early life ==
Argota was born in Redlands, California to Filipino parents. She graduated high school from Connections Academy, an online virtual high school. She began her professional career as contestant on the Arsenio Hall-hosted Star Search on CBS in 2003.

== Career ==
Argota's first acting role was an appearance in the 2007 independent film Schooled. In 2008, Argota was cast on the Nickelodeon comedy television series True Jackson, VP, playing the role of Lulu, one of the best friends of True Jackson (Keke Palmer). As a singer, Argota has released two independent albums Dreams Come True (2006) and Ashley (2007).

In 2011 Argota was cast as the female lead, Kelly, in another Nickelodeon comedy series Bucket & Skinner's Epic Adventures. Argota confirmed on July 5, 2012, that Nickelodeon had cancelled Bucket & Skinner's Epic Adventures. She also appeared in a Nickelodeon celebrity-episode of the series BrainSurge during which she lost during a Sudden Death round to Jerry Trainor. She appeared again in 2011 with other various Nickelodeon celebrities and won. Argota planned to attend New York University in 2011, majoring in nursing.

Argota was cast in the 2014 Disney Channel Original Movie How to Build a Better Boy along with Matt Shively, who also was on True Jackson V.P. With her in summer 2013, playing the school rival of the film's leads. In December 2013, she starred in the show Aladdin and His Winter Wish at the Pasadena Playhouse playing the Princess. This same month, she was nominated for the Libby Award by Peta2 for her work with adoption practices. Starting in 2014, Argota has played the recurring role of Lou Chan on the ABC Family drama The Fosters, and had a recurring role on the Disney XD series Lab Rats as S-1.

== Personal life ==
In August 2021, Argota married actor Mick Torres after having their wedding delayed due to the COVID-19 pandemic.

On January 9, 2024, Argota announced she and Torres were expecting their first child. Their son was born in June 2024.

== Filmography ==
=== Film ===
Year	Title	Role	Notes
2007	Schooled	Soomi Alverez	
2014	How to Build a Better Boy	Nevaeh Barnes	Disney Channel Original Movie
2015	Broken: A Musical	Helen	
2016	All Hallows' Eve	Sarah Ettels	
2018	Cover Versions	Amber	
2019	Snatchers	Kiana	
2020	I Hate New Year's	Cassie Holmes	

=== Television ===
Year	Title	Role	Notes
2008	iCarly	Kathy	Episode: "iHave a Lovesick Teacher"
2008–2011	True Jackson, VP	Lulu	Main role
2011–2013	Bucket & Skinner's Epic Adventures	Kelly	Main role
2012	Baby Daddy	Ava	Episode: "May the Best Friend Win"
2013	The Troop	Mazie	Episode: "Road Trip (aka "The Kiss")"
2014	Austin & Ally	Elle	Episode: "Glee Clubs & Glory"
2014	Chasing Life	Kristina	Episode: "Finding Chemo"
2014–2015	Lab Rats	S-1/Taylor	Recurring role (seasons 3–4)
2014–2016	The Fosters	Lou Chan	Recurring role (seasons 2–4)
2016	Girl Meets World	Nikki	Episodes: "Girl Meets High School: Parts One and Two"
2018	Liberty Crossing	Abigail Abaya	Main role
2018	Adopted	Mandi	Recurring role
2019	The Rookie	Bella	Episode: "Warriors and Guardians"
2022	All American	Gia	Episodes: "Don't Sweat the Technique", "Feeling Myself"
2023	Freeridge	Davina	3 episodes

== Discography ==
=== Albums ===
Title	Album details
Ashley	Released: October 19, 2007; Format: CD, digital download; Label: New Revolution

=== Reissues ===
Title	Album details
Ashley	Released: August 14, 2008 (CD) August 19, 2008 (Digital Download); Format: CD, digital download; Label: New Revolution

=== Extended Plays ===
Title	Album details
Dreams Come True	Released: September 15, 2006; Format: CD, digital download; Label: New Revolution
Ashley	Released: June 15, 2008; Format: CD, digital download; Label: New Revolution

=== Singles ===
Title	Year	Album
"Limitless"	2015	Non-album singles
"Hope Is In You"	2016	Non-album singles
"I Don't Want To Be" (with Matt Shively, Ben Schreen, Lindsay Pearce and Kelley Jakle)	2018	Non-album singles
"I Always Will"	2021	TBA

=== As a featured artist ===
Title	Year	Album
"Ish" (Brad Hooks feat. Ashley Argota)	2016	7 / Green 27jeans (EP)

=== Promotional singles ===
Title	Year	Album
"Dreams Come True"	2008	Dreams Come True & Ashley
"Backwards"	2008	Ashley
"I'm Not That Girl"	2009	Non-album promotional singles
"This Time"	2010	Non-album promotional singles

=== Other appearances ===
Year	Song	Album	Refs
2011	"Dance With Me Santa"	Broadway's Carols for a Cure, Vol. 13	
2014	"Cage 23" Tourniquet feat. Gabbie Rae and Ashley Argota	Onward To Freedom	

=== Music videos ===
Year	Title	Director	Refs
2006	"Dreams Come True"	Jason Jarrett	
2008	"Backwards"	Jason Jarrett	
2015	"Cage 23"	Unknown	
2016	"Ish"	David Marroquin	
2016	"Hope Is In You"	Samuel Womer	
