= Cruise (film) =

- Theatrical release poster
- Directed by: Robert D. Siegel
- Written by: Robert D. Siegel
- Produced by: Holly Brown; Alex Garcia; Scott LaStaiti; Laura Walker
- Starring: Spencer Boldman; Emily Ratajkowski; Lucas Salvagno; Noah Robbins; Gino Cafarelli; Kathrine Narducci; Sebastian Maniscalco
- Cinematography: Noah Greenberg
- Edited by: Paul Frank
- Music by: Jay Wadley
- Production companies: Slated; AG Capital
- Distributed by: Vertical Entertainment
- Release date: September 28, 2018 (United States)
- Country: United States
- Language: English

Cruise is an American romantic comedy film, written and directed by Robert D. Siegel. It stars Spencer Boldman, Emily Ratajkowski, Lucas Salvagno, Noah Robbins, Gino Cafarelli, Kathrine Narducci and Sebastian Maniscalco. Filmed in 2015, it was eventually released direct-to-video in September 2018, by Vertical Entertainment.

== Plot ==
Set during the summer of 1987, Cruise focuses on Gio Fortunato, a blue-collar Italian-American who is preoccupied with car racing and chasing women. Life starts to change for Fortunato when he meets Jessica Weinberg, a "nice Jewish girl" from Long Island who ventures into Gio's neighborhood looking for some action.

== Cast ==
- Spencer Boldman as Gio Fortunato
- Emily Ratajkowski as Jessica Weinberg / Francesca Russo
- Lucas Salvagno as Chris Carbone
- Noah Robbins as Anthony Panagopoulos
- Gino Cafarelli as Papa Fortunato
- Kathrine Narducci as Mama Fortunato
- Sebastian Maniscalco as Dinardo
- Jen Cohen as Mrs. Weintraub

== Production ==
In September 2015, it was announced Spencer Boldman and Emily Ratajkowski had joined the cast of the film, with Robert D. Siegel directing from a screenplay he wrote. Alex Garcia, Laura Walker, Holly Brown, and Scott LaStaiti served as producers on the film under their AG Capital banner. UTA Independent Film Group initially held the domestic rights to the film as its financier. In October 2015, Kathrine Narducci and Gino Cafarelli joined the cast of the film. Principal photography started in fall 2015 in New York City. This was Ratajkowski's first starring role, after playing supporting roles in Gone Girl, Entourage, and We Are Your Friends, which had preceded this movie in production.

== Release ==
In May 2018, Vertical Entertainment acquired United States and Canada distribution rights to the film. It was released direct-to-video on September 28, 2018.

== Reception ==
On Rotten Tomatoes the film has an approval rating of 38% based on reviews from eight critics. On Metacritic the film has a score of 46% based on reviews from 4 critics, indicating "mixed or average" reviews.
