= Lab Rats (American TV series) =

American comedy television series

- Genre: Sitcom; Science fiction
- Created by: Chris Peterson; Bryan Moore
- Starring: Billy Unger; Spencer Boldman; Kelli Berglund; Tyrel Jackson Williams; Hal Sparks
- Theme music composer: Niclas Molinder; Joacim Persson; Johan Alkenäs
- Composer: Bert Selen
- Country of origin: United States
- Original language: English
- No. of seasons: 4
- No. of episodes: 89 (list of episodes)

Production
- Executive producers: Chris Peterson; Bryan Moore; Mark Brazill; Hayes Jackson
- Producer: Greg A. Hampson
- Cinematography: Rick F. Gunter; Thomas Eckelberry
- Camera setup: Multi-camera
- Running time: 20–22 minutes
- Production company: It's a Laugh Productions

Original release
- Network: Disney XD
- Release: February 27, 2012 – February 3, 2016

Related
- Lab Rats: Elite Force (2016)

Lab Rats is an American comedy television series created by Chris Peterson and Bryan Moore that aired on Disney XD from February 27, 2012 to February 3, 2016. The series stars Billy Unger, Spencer Boldman, Kelli Berglund, Tyrel Jackson Williams, and Hal Sparks.

== Plot ==
A young teenager named Leo Dooley lives a normal life until the day his mother Tasha marries billionaire inventor Donald Davenport, with whom they move in. While trying to find his bedroom, Leo accidentally discovers teenage siblings with bionic superpowers living in his new basement. The series follows the bionic teens as they unravel in adventurous situations in an attempt to live life like a normal family in the fictional town of Mission Creek, California.

As the series progresses, the series introduces various new characters, including Davenport's younger brother Douglas and Douglas' android son Marcus; Krane and his bionic soldiers Taylor, formerly known as S-1, and Sebastian, formerly known as S-3; and scientist Giselle and her android Troy West. In the third season, Davenport opens up a bionic academy on a bionic island to train Krane's soldiers to be the world's new bionic heroes.

== Episodes ==
Season	Episodes	Originally released	
Season	Episodes	First released	Last released
1	19	February 27, 2012	November 5, 2012
2	25	February 25, 2013	January 13, 2014
3	23	February 17, 2014	February 5, 2015
4	22	March 18, 2015	February 3, 2016

== Cast ==
- Billy Unger as Chase
- Spencer Boldman as Adam
- Kelli Berglund as Bree
- Tyrel Jackson Williams as Leo
- Hal Sparks as Davenport

== Production ==
On May 10, 2010, Disney XD green-lit a pilot under the title of Billion Dollar Freshmen, created by Chris Peterson and Bryan Moore, as executive producers alongside Mark Brazill. The pilot was filmed in the summer of 2010. On July 13, 2011, Disney XD officially ordered Lab Rats, with production to begin in September 2011 in Hollywood for a 2012 premiere. Starring in the series are Tyrel Jackson Williams as Leo, Billy Unger as Chase, Spencer Boldman as Adam, Kelli Berglund as Bree, and Hal Sparks as Davenport.

On May 18, 2012, Disney XD renewed the series for a second season. On July 26, 2013, Disney XD renewed the series for a third season. On May 9, 2014, Disney XD renewed the series for a fourth season. On June 25, 2015, Kelli Berglund stated in an interview that the fourth season would be the final season.

== Broadcast ==
The series originally premiered on Disney XD on February 27, 2012, and on Disney Channel on March 2, 2012. In Canada, it first aired on Disney XD on February 24, 2012. It later stopped airing on Disney XD in Canada and moved to Disney Channel due to DHX Media losing Disney rights. In the United Kingdom and Ireland, it first aired as a preview on March 29, 2012, and officially premiered on April 19, 2012. In South Africa, it premiered on Disney XD on June 10, 2012. In Australia and New Zealand, it first aired on Disney Channel on December 31, 2012, and officially premiered on January 10, 2013.

== Reception ==
=== Critical ===
Variety television critic Brian Lowry knocked the series' one-hour premiere for failing "to exhibit basic elements of coherence" and for featuring "too many lapses in logic".

=== Ratings ===
The series launch of Lab Rats in February 2012 was the most-watched series premiere in Disney XD history, drawing 1.27 million viewers and performing well in key demographics. The followup encore of the premiere that aired on Disney Channel on March 2, 2012, ranked as the number-one telecast in kids 2–11 for the week of February 27–March 4, 2012, drawing 2.3 million viewers in the demographic.

Viewership and ratings per season of Lab Rats
Season	Episodes	First aired		Last aired		Avg. viewers (millions)
Season	Episodes	Date	Viewers (millions)	Date	Viewers (millions)	Avg. viewers (millions)
1	15	February 27, 2012	1.27	November 5, 2012	0.85	0.89
2	25	February 25, 2013	1.01	January 13, 2014	0.74	0.73
3	20	February 17, 2014	1.05	February 5, 2015	0.81	0.71
4	22	March 18, 2015	0.86	February 3, 2016	0.71	0.62

=== Awards and nominations ===
Year	Awards	Category	Nominee	Result	Ref
2016	Kids' Choice Awards	Favorite TV Show – Kids Show	Lab Rats: Bionic Island	Nominated	

== Lab Rats: Elite Force spinoff series ==
On September 3, 2015, it was announced that Lab Rats would have a joint spinoff series with Mighty Med under the title of Lab Rats: Elite Force. Only Billy Unger and Kelli Berglund from Lab Rats were reported to be returning for the new series, alongside Bradley Steven Perry, Jake Short, and Paris Berelc from Mighty Med. It was subsequently announced that Lab Rats: Elite Force would premiere on Disney XD on March 2, 2016.
