= Spencer Boldman =

American actor (born 1992)

- Boldman in Paris, 2026
- Born: July 28, 1992 (age 34); Dallas, Texas, U.S.
- Education: Plano East Senior High School
- Occupation: Actor
- Years active: 2009–present
- Known for: Lab Rats

Spencer Boldman (born July 28, 1992) is an American actor and producer. He first gained recognition for his role of Adam Davenport on Disney XD's Lab Rats. His subsequent work includes the film Cruise (2018) and the Hulu limited series Welcome to Chippendales (2022). In 2026, Boldman starred as James in the supernatural thriller You Can’t Leave , which he also executive produced.

== Early life and education ==
Spencer Boldman was born on July 28, 1992, in Dallas, Texas to Laura (née Schaefer) and Michael Boldman. He graduated from Plano East Senior High School in Plano, Texas in June 2010. He is of German, English, Scottish, and Irish descent.

== Career ==
He first met with the Disney network when he was 16. He filmed 3 pilot episodes for the network. Boldman's first major acting role was playing Adam, the eldest of the bionic teenagers, on the Disney XD series Lab Rats which premiered in 2012. The same year he had a role in the film 21 Jump Street. In 2013, he was cast in the Disney Channel Original Movie Zapped, opposite Zendaya. In 2015, Boldman was cast opposite Emily Ratajkowski in the romance film Cruise which is set during the 1980s; the film was released in 2018. In 2022, he was cast in the recurring role of Lance McCrae in the Hulu limited series Welcome to Chippendales, based on the story of Chippendales and its founder Steve Banerjee (played by Kumail Nanjiani). In 2026, Boldman also starred as James in the supernatural thriller You Can’t Leave, which he also executive produced.

== Filmography ==
Film roles
Year	Title	Role	Notes
2012	21 Jump Street	French Samuels	
2014	Cowgirls 'n Angels: Dakota's Summer	Bryce	Direct-to-video film
2018	Cruise	Gio Fortunato	
2026	You Can’t Leave	James	Theatrical

Television roles
Year	Title	Role	Notes
2009	iCarly	Nate	Episode: "iSpeed Date"
2009	Jack and Janet Save the Planet	Jack	Unsold television pilot
2010–2011	I'm in the Band	Bryce Johnson	3 episodes
2012–2016	Lab Rats	Adam Davenport	Main role
2013	Jessie	Ted Hoover	Episode: "Break-Up and Shape-Up"
2014	Zapped	Jackson	Disney Channel Original Movie
2022	Welcome to Chippendales	Lance McCrae	Recurring role
