= Mark Brazill =

Television creator, executive producer

Mark Brazill (born April 16, 1962) is a television creator from Dunkirk, NY. He is best known as one of the creators of That '70s Show.

== Career ==
Additional information needed

As well as That 70's Show, he has been credited for That 80's Show and That 90's Show. He also wrote for and produced 3rd Rock from the Sun, wrote for In Living Color, and co-created and wrote many episodes of Mr. Rhodes, along with several other writing and producing credits.

== Conflict with Judd Apatow ==
In late 2001, Judd Apatow sought to have Topher Grace of That '70s Show appear in an episode of his series Undeclared. This initiated a string of heated emails between the two. Brazill claimed that Apatow had stolen his idea for a comedy about a rock band and used it on The Ben Stiller Show in the early 1990s. The sketch was titled "The Grungies", a dark parody of The Monkees television series focusing on an outrageous grunge band. The emails were subsequently leaked and widely circulated online.
