= List of Mighty Med episodes =

Mighty Med is an American Disney XD original series created by Jim Bernstein and Andy Schwartz and produced by It's a Laugh Productions for Disney XD. It stars Bradley Steven Perry, Jake Short, Paris Berelc, Devan Leos, and Augie Isaac. The series aired for two seasons, premiering on October 7, 2013, and running through September 9, 2015.

== Series overview ==
Season	Episodes	Originally released	
Season	Episodes	First released	Last released
1	24	October 7, 2013	September 15, 2014
2	20	October 20, 2014	September 9, 2015

== Episodes ==
=== Season 1 (2013–14) ===
No. overall	No. in season	Title	Directed by	Written by	Original release date	Prod. code	U.S. viewers (millions)
1	1	"Saving the People Who Save People"	Eric Dean Seaton	Jim Bernstein; Andy Schwartz	October 7, 2013	101–102	1.02
Kaz and Oliver are two teenage fanboys who love hanging out at a comic book shop called The Domain. Kaz spots a man sneaking into a supply closet who looks like Blue Tornado, a superhero they read about. They enter the closet and Oliver moves a plunger to reveal a doorway to a hidden hospital for superheroes called Mighty Med. The boys use their comic book knowledge to save a hero and meet Horace Diaz, the chief of staff, who considers erasing their memories of the hospital but later lets them work there. They also meet Skylar Storm, a heroine who lost her powers, and Alan Diaz, Horace's nephew who dislikes normos and wants Kaz and Oliver gone. When Tecton, Kaz's favorite superhero, is rushed into the hospital, Kaz nearly gets him and Oliver fired by performing unauthorized surgery on him, but makes up for it by managing to cure Tecton in time to fight Megahertz, a villain who storms into Mighty Med. Kaz and Oliver get jobs at Mighty Med. It is revealed at the end that Wallace and Clyde, co-owners of The Domain, are twin oblivious super-villains who plan to use Kaz and Oliver to find Mighty Med . Guest stars: Carlos Lacámara as Horace, Augie Isaac as Gus, Cozi Zuehlsdorff as Jordan, Jason Sklar as Clyde, Randy Sklar as Wallace, Karan Soni as Benny, James Ryen as Megahertz, Jilon VanOver as Tecton, Angela Martinez as Newscaster
2	2	"Frighty Med"	Eric Dean Seaton	Vincent Brown	October 14, 2013	103	1.06
Oliver must follow through with creating a Frankenstein-inspired play when his dad becomes curious about where he goes every day after school. Meanwhile, Kaz and Skylar embark on a mission to uncover the mystery behind the disappearance of the superhero Brain Matter. When Kaz accidentally revives an evil Brain Matter, he and Skylar follow Brain Matter to Oliver's play. In the end, the audience thinks that Kaz, Skylar, and Brain Matter were just part of the play. Guest stars: Carlos Lacámara as Horace, Augie Isaac as Gus, Cozi Zuehlsdorff as Jordan, Napoleon Ryan as Brain Matter, Troy Brenna as Brain Matter Monster
3	3	"I, Normo"	Eric Dean Seaton	Clayton Sakoda; Ian Weinreich	October 21, 2013	104	0.82
Kaz wants to ask Stefanie to the carnival, but when she turns him down he makes up that he has a girlfriend named Connie Valentine. Meanwhile, Alan tries to prove himself as a doctor by curing the superhero Titanio of his amnesia. In the end, he succeeds, but Titanio thinks he is the Black Falcon and chases after him. Guest stars: Carlos Lacámara as Horace, Augie Isaac as Gus, Brooke Sorenson as Stefanie, Chris Elwood as Titanio
4	4	"Sm'Oliver's Travels"	Jon Rosenbaum	Mark Jordan Legan	October 28, 2013	105	0.70
Oliver uses his burgeoning medical skills at school when he performs CPR on Stefanie's Pomeranian, which quickly elevates his social status much to Kaz's chagrin. When Kaz thinks the popularity has gone to his head, he cuts Oliver down to size, literally, with a shrinking ray. Meanwhile, Horace cannot perform surgery on Citadel, an ailing superhero with an impenetrable metal exoskeleton. To perform the surgery, a shrunken Oliver is sent inside the hero's body to diagnose the problem, which turns out to be Micros, Citadel's arch nemesis. Elsewhere, Wallace and Clyde try to find Mighty Med and defeat Horace by placing a tracker on Kaz's backpack, but Gus takes Kaz's backpack by mistake while heading to the hospital and the twins inadvertently cause Gus' popularity to skyrocket. Guest stars: Carlos Lacámara as Horace, Augie Isaac as Gus, Jason Sklar as Clyde, Randy Sklar as Wallace, Brooke Sorenson as Stefanie, Adam Leadbeater as Micros Absent: Devan Leos as Alan Diaz
5	5	"Pranks for Nothing"	Jon Rosenbaum	Clayton Sakoda; Ian Weinreich	November 4, 2013	106	0.79
When Kaz and Oliver learn that pranks do not exist in Skylar's world, they set out to teach her how to prank. When the Great Defender joins in, he takes pranking too far and wreaks havoc on the hospital, which turns out to be another prank by Horace and Skylar. Meanwhile, Horace Diaz gives Alan the task of babysitting the Great Defender's daughter, who is a shape-shifter, so Alan can get a watch. After she is thrown into the garbage disposal by accident in her cup form, Alan nearly risks his life to save her while the havoc is in process. After saving her, Horace tells Alan that the girl is not the Great Defender's daughter. Alan marches off in anger, but then Horace reveals that the Great Defender doesn't have a child and that it was a prank on Alan. Special guest star: Dwight Howard as The Great Defender Guest stars: Carlos Lacámara as Horace, Zoe Hendrix as Jamie
6	6	"It's Not the End of the World"	Jon Rosenbaum	Jim Bernstein; Andy Schwartz	November 11, 2013	107	1.04
When Kaz and Oliver meet Timeline, a superhero who has the ability to see into the future and is Horace's cousin, they discover that villain Crimson Demon wants to release his demon brothers so they can destroy the world. Meanwhile, Skylar starts her first day of school as Connie Valentine. Unfortunately, Oliver gets upset when he thinks Skylar has a crush on Gus and intends to find out why. When Crimson Demon tries to open the portal, Kaz, Oliver, Skylar, and Timeline seal him in the portal. Guest stars: Carlos Lacámara as Timeline, Augie Isaac as Gus, Cozi Zuehlsdorff as Jordan, Lauren Burns as Ms. Kessler Absent: Devan Leos as Alan Diaz
7	7	"Evil Gus"	Jon Rosenbaum	Stephen Engel	January 13, 2014	108	0.67
When Gus contracts a strange illness, Kaz and Oliver devise a plan to sneak him into the ER for treatment, where he ends up becoming a villain due to the vaccine. Meanwhile, Skylar asks Horace to pretend to be her father for parent-teacher conference, but Horace takes the role very seriously. Guest stars: Carlos Lacámara as Horace, Augie Isaac as Gus, Lori Alan as Ms. Gleason
8	8	"Alan's Reign of Terror"	Sean Lambert	Stephen Engel; Vincent Brown	February 3, 2014	109	0.58
Oliver believes Alan might become a villain because of Horace being mean to him, so he has a talk with Horace. He agrees to let Alan be in charge for the day, but Alan bosses everybody around and they feel miserable. Meanwhile, Kaz and Clyde have a game-off, with the help of Jordan. Kaz loses and is forced to give his nice-looking pants to Clyde and he and Oliver are banned from the store. Wallace then reminds Clyde in private that they need Kaz and Oliver to find Mighty Med, so the two are no longer banned. Guest stars: Jason Sklar as Clyde, Randy Sklar as Wallace, Cozi Zuehlsdorff as Jordan
9	9	"So You Think You Can Be a Sidekick"	Sean Lambert	Jim Bernstein; Mark Jordan Legan	February 10, 2014	110	0.58
Kaz wants to be the superhero Tecton's sidekick, but Oliver is chosen instead. Oliver then does many horrific and dangerous chores for Tecton, while Kaz relents that it should be him. They plan to get Oliver fired, but Megahertz comes and kidnaps him. Kaz and Skylar must come to his rescue. Meanwhile, outraged at Oliver's appointment as Tecton's sidekick, Alan and Benny plan to become a superhero duo. In the end, Alan becomes Tecton's sidekick instead of Oliver. Guest stars: Karan Soni as Benny, Jilon VanOver as Tecton, James Ryen as Megahertz, Angela Martinez as Newscaster
10	10	"Lockdown"	Sean Lambert	Stephen Engel; Vincent Brown	February 24, 2014	111	0.50
Kaz plans a surprise birthday party for Oliver at the Domain, but there is a security lockdown at Mighty Med just as they attempt to leave. Kaz attempts to lure Oliver out of Mighty Med multiple times, resulting in Oliver yelling at him. When Kaz opens the vent, the villain trying to sneak into the hospital, Revengeance, takes over Horace and the hospital staff with the intent of using the nine mighty administrators to unlock the hospital's positron reactor to turn himself human. Kaz, Oliver, and Alan must work together to stop the villainous cloud before he becomes human. Meanwhile, Wallace tries to convince Clyde to turn good and has an intervention with several former villains. The intervention fails and the former villains go evil again. It turns out Wallace and Clyde have some form of melting with firepower. At The Domain, Skylar and Gus put Oliver's surprise party together. Guest stars: Augie Isaac as Gus, Carlos Lacámara as Horace, Jason Sklar as Clyde, Randy Sklar as Wallace, Patton Oswalt as Ed
11	11	"All That Kaz"	Sean Lambert	Mark Jordan Legan; Andy Schwartz	March 10, 2014	112	0.59
Mighty Med's patients rank the hospital staff and Kaz ends up getting number one. Oliver gets second to last and wants to change his rank. Neocortex, a superhero with mind control, communication, and altering powers, is checked into Mighty Med and Oliver convinces him to change his personality to be like Kaz's. Oliver becomes popular among the staff and patients, but Kaz gets jealous. He convinces Neocortex to change Oliver back, but Oliver, not wanting to change back, reflects his power back at him. Neocortex's neural nuclear reactor is about to go off, which will destroy the hospital. Kaz must step up and be Oliver and comes up with a plan to get Neocortex back to normal. Oliver uses a reversed polarity defibrillator and Neocortex returns to normal. The hero then changes Oliver back. Meanwhile, Skylar has the normo flu and Alan notices she can fly again. Thinking it is a medical breakthrough, Alan tells Horace, severely weakening Skylar's health in the process, but Horace says that it is just a temporary side effect and is disappointed again. Guest stars: Carlos Lacámara as Horace, Mike Bradecich as Neocortex
12	12	"The Friend of My Friend Is My Enemy"	Rich Correll	Jim Bernstein; Andy Schwartz	March 24, 2014	113	0.60
Skylar's longtime friend, Experion, checks into Mighty Med and instantly reconnects with her. A jealous Oliver believes Experion is trying to kill Skylar and disguises himself as her to prove it. When he seems to be mistaken, he and Kaz leave Skylar and Experion alone, where Experion reveals Oliver was right and he is trying to capture Skylar to deliver her to the Annihilator, her nemesis. He paralyzes her and they attempt to leave. When Skylar says she prefers coal over diamonds, Oliver realizes that she's trying to signal their help, as coal is her weakness. Oliver initiates a lockdown on Mighty Med and Skylar breaks free of Experion. While they fight, Oliver turns off the light, as no one from Skylar and Experion's planet, Caldera, can see in the darkness, and Kaz retrieves night vision goggles for Skylar, who defeats Experion easily. Meanwhile, feeling unappreciated, Alan creates a comic book about Mighty Med, including revealing the location of the hospital, and wants Wallace and Clyde to sell it, not knowing that his uncle Horace erased their memory of Mighty Med and they're trying to find it. They send Gus to read it, but they play the bagpipes, use a jackhammer, and make other loud sounds just as Alan tells Gus the secrets of Mighty Med. At the end of the episode, Alan once again tries to pursue the two to buy his comic, but they say no, so Alan leaves his comic on a shelf in the store. Guest stars: Augie Isaac as Gus, Jason Sklar as Clyde, Randy Sklar as Wallace, Chase Austin as Experion
13	13	"Atomic Blast from the Past"	Jon Rosenbaum	Clayton Sakoda; Ian Weinreich	March 31, 2014	114	0.48
Kaz opens a wormhole and lets out a superhero from 1953 named Captain Atomic. Meanwhile, Gus, Stefanie, and Connie (Skylar) make a Skylar Storm movie. When every hero in the city gets bested by the Black Falcon, Captain Atomic tries to help, but gets severely injured. Oliver figures out that his atomic battery is corroded and Horace sends them back to 1953, where the 1953 Captain Atomic captures them, but Oliver escapes with Kaz and the battery. With a new battery, Captain Atomic fights the Black Falcon with the help of Skylar. The Black Falcon escapes, but Captain Atomic gets his confidence back and decides to stay in the future. Guest stars: Carlos Lacámara as Horace, Brooke Sorenson as Stefanie, Bradley Dodds as Captain Atomic, Scott Anthony Leet as Black Falcon Absent: Devan Leos as Alan Diaz
14	14	"Growing Pains"	Jon Rosenbaum	Stephen Engel; Mark Jordan Legan	April 7, 2014	117	0.44
Kaz and Oliver gripe about not being able to buy a video game from a new employee at The Domain due to their age. At Mighty Med, Horace operates on a toy-Brain Matter. When Brain Matter grows back to normal, Horace reveals his serum worked and Brain Matter has the powers he intended to give himself. When testing out his telekinesis, he makes a tree grow older. Kaz sees this as an opportunity to finish his biology lab due Monday in 30 seconds rather than 30 days. However, the caterpillar eggs intended to grow older shrink into eggs, as does a bird in the rec room. Later on, this affects Oliver, reverting him back to the age of 4. Brain Matter attempt to fix it, but Oliver grows from a four-year-old to a thirty-year-old. After buying the game they wanted at the beginning, Oliver grows into an elder man. With Oliver in danger of dying of old age, Kaz feeds Oliver his eggs and he returns to being 4. He is later returned to his original age via an orange that Brain Matter used his powers on. Meanwhile, Alan's power to turn into animals is developing, but he refuses to talk to Horace about it, so Skylar tries to play middle man and get them to talk. Guest stars: Carlos Lacámara as Horace, Napoleon Ryan as Brain Matter, Jeremy Howard as Philip, Kurt Ela as Bryan, Luke Judy as young Oliver, Corey Sorenson as adult Oliver, Porter Fowler as old Oliver
15	15	"Night of the Living Nightmare"	Adam Weissman	Mark Jordan Legan; Vincent Brown	April 14, 2014	121	0.87
Kaz and Oliver are exhausted and stuck working the overnight shift during a lunar eclipse. When Neocortex arrives, Kaz discovers that he is putting people into daydreams, but when the lunar eclipse strikes, Neocortex's problem gets worse when people who fall asleep and die inside nightmares also die in real life, as shown on Alley Cat, who thankfully has nine lives. Horace, Oliver, Kaz, and Neocortex try to keep everyone awake, but Kaz falls asleep while helping Oliver convince his mom that he's at Kaz's house. In his nightmare, Kaz is facing Megahertz at the school. Oliver gets into Kaz's head thanks to Neocortex and tells Kaz he has superpowers and can fight back in the nightmare. Kaz clones himself and manages to defeat Megahertz. Kaz wakes up, but the rest of the hospital has fallen asleep. Oliver prays for a miracle and, thankfully, the lunar eclipse ends and Neocortex returns to normal, deducing that the lunar eclipse was messing with his powers. Meanwhile, Skylar tries to get Jordan to like her and participates in a nerd game at The Domain. After Jordan insults Skylar, Skylar battles her, but both end up killing each other in the game. Skylar and Jordan decide to be friends. Guest stars: Carlos Lacámara as Horace, Jason Sklar as Clyde, Randy Sklar as Wallace, Cozi Zuehlsdorff as Jordan, James Ryan as Megahertz, Mike Bradecich as Neocortex, Jeremy Howard as Philip, Kurt Ela as Bryan Absent: Devan Leos as Alan Diaz
16	16	"Mighty Mad"	Danny J. Boyle	Stephen Engel; Mark Jordan Legan	April 21, 2014	115	0.53
Logan High is full of fighting, anger, and negativity. Kaz suspects the gym teacher, Mr. Patterson, is the super villain Dr. Wrath, because he saw him walk through a solid door; Dr. Wrath feeds on negative energy. Kaz confronts him during detention and accidentally paralyzes him. However, Skylar reveals that he's actually a secret superhero agent. Kaz then wonders who Dr. Wrath is when Stefanie reveals it is her and ties Kaz and Skylar up in negative chains, but they escape by saying positive things about each other. Skylar fights Stefanie while Kaz messes with her ionic blaster. It turns out that Kaz reversed the polarity and caused the blaster to release positive energy instead of negative. Dr. Wrath morphs into his real form and disintegrates. The agent arrives and takes Dr. Wrath away. Gus reveals the real Stefanie was locked in a closet with no memory. Meanwhile, Oliver tries to fulfill a community service project through Alan by getting him to try normo food. He succeeds, but normo food has strange side effects on Alan. Guest stars: Windell D. Middlebrooks as Mr. Patterson/Agent Blaylock, Brooke Sorenson as Stefanie
17	17	"Fantasy League of Heroes"	Alfonso Ribeiro	Clayton Sakoda; Ian Weinreich	June 9, 2014	119	N/A
Kaz's fantasy football team always loses, so he wants to create a superhero fantasy league since he knows everything about superheroes. While Skylar believes it's a huge mistake, the league is successful until Kaz trades Tecton for Captain Atomic; the two superheroes begin arguing about who's the best superhero. When a runaway Ferris wheel has every superhero in the hospital after it for points, no one is stopping Sonic Shriek, a villain who wants to destroy the Benjamin Franklin bridge. Kaz and Skylar must save the bridge alone, until Tecton and Captain Atomic arrive and fight each other rather than Sonic Shriek. Skylar defeats Sonic Shriek and while Tecton and Captain Atomic deal with him and his bomb, Skylar reprimands Kaz for his league, but changes her tune after learning she's now in first place. Meanwhile, Oliver teaches Horace about normo football. When Alan says he knows more about football than Oliver, they settle their differences with a trivia contest. However, Oliver is distracted by Alan's partner, Adrian Peterson. In the end, Oliver and Horace lose, so they have to sing a song about Alan. Special guest star: Adrian Peterson Guest stars: Carlos Lacámara as Horace, Jilon VanOver as Tecton, Bradley Dodds as Captain Atomic, Jeremy Howard as Philip, Marcus Giamatti as Sonic Shriek, Angela Martinez as Newscaster
18	18	"Copy Kaz"	Alfonso Ribeiro	Stephen Engel; Vincent Brown	June 16, 2014	120	N/A
Kaz and Oliver must study for a Mighty Med exam that will allow them to learn deeper secrets of Mighty Med, but if they fail, they will be cubed. Meanwhile, Wallace uses an optical image replicator to turn Clyde into an identical look-alike of Kaz. Clyde successfully follows Oliver into Mighty Med, but when he tries to steal the missing half of the Dyad of Nebulon, Horace senses something is amiss and sends the guards after him, just as the real Kaz walks back into Mighty Med. Horace catches a Kaz and, thanks to Oliver, doesn't cube him, but erases his memory. The guards send out the Kaz and the other Kaz appears. Oliver realizes that this Kaz is the real Kaz and the other one was an impersonator. Horace explains that the other half of the dyad is with a villain named Catastrophe, who, upon being defeated, split into two humans: Wallace and Clyde. Back at The Domain, Wallace is trying to recall Clyde's memory of Mighty Med, which was successfully wiped. Kaz and Oliver pass their exam and learn the secrets of Mighty Med. Meanwhile, when Alan comes to Skylar for advice on a girl he likes, she suspects it's her and tries to dissuade him, only to learn it was a nurse who's also an octopus. Guest stars: Carlos Lacámara as Horace, Jason Sklar as Clyde, Randy Sklar as Wallace
19	19	"Guitar Superhero"	Rob Schiller	Stephen Engel; Mark Jordan Legan	June 23, 2014	122	N/A
When a freak accident suddenly gives edgy rock star Jade super powers at a concert, attendees Kaz and Oliver recognize a new hero in her and introduce her to Mighty Med. Jade becomes the hero Remix with Kaz and Oliver's help, but Skylar isn't convinced she's a hero when she's very demanding of service and fame. Skylar decides to teach her a lesson by having Titanio dress like Soul Slayer, a teleporting villain, to attack her during rehearsal. When the real Soul Slayer arrives, Jade must become a real hero to save a powerless Skylar from Soul Slayer. Meanwhile, Jordan and Gus learn they will be dissecting frogs in class and Jordan plots to steal it to save it from dissection, but when they attempt to retrieve Gus' ransom note, their teacher catches them and reveals that when she discovered it was gone, she assumed they were trying to save it and told a local animal rights organization who will give the savior one thousand dollars, which goes to Gus since Jordan made him take the blame, much to her disappointment. Special guest star: Debby Ryan as Jade/Remix Guest stars: Cozi Zuehlsdorff as Jordan, Chris Elwood as Titanio, Lori Alan as Ms. Gleason, Scott Connors as Soul Slayer Absent: Devan Leos as Alan Diaz
20	20	"Free Wi-Fi"	Jon Rosenbaum	Jim Bernstein; Andy Schwartz	June 30, 2014	118	N/A
Kaz hasn't read his reading book again, so he decides to copy Oliver's study guide, which is on his flash drive. Kaz retrieves the flash drive from the junk drawer, but when he follows the instructions the personal computer assistant gives him, he releases the assistant, who reveals himself to be a villain, and the flash drive was really a digital prison. The villain traps Kaz in the computer and begins searching for Mighty Med's main computer. When Oliver opens the laptop and finds Kaz, he brings it to Benny, who reveals the villain is Wi-Fi, and Kaz will be deleted if Wi-Fi's virus reaches him. Oliver brings him to a 3D printer and Kaz is released just in time. However, Wi-Fi is searching for the list of superheroes to sell to the other villains and rewires Titanio to attack Kaz, Oliver, and Benny. Kaz says he's going to transfer the files onto Horace's laptop out loud and Wi-Fi jumps in the computer and opens the downloaded file, only to discover they're all pictures of bridges, and Kaz puts Wi-Fi back in the flash drive before the villain figures it out. Meanwhile, Alan wants to meet his father, a superhero named Optimo, but Horace won't allow because Optimo's too important and it could put them in danger. Skylar agrees to help him find the mysterious superhero, but all they find is a regular guy named Nelson. Skylar realizes his father must be a normo, and when Horace arrives to collect them, he reluctantly confirms it. Alan is desperate to prove his father is a superhero and uses his powers so Nelson will save him, but is proven wrong. Horace stays back to wipe Nelson's mind of Alan's powers, but it is revealed Nelson really is the superhero Optimo, who acknowledges Alan as his son, but knows he could put them in danger if he has a relationship with him. Guest stars: Carlos Lacámara as Horace, Karan Soni as Benny, Chris Elwood as Titanio, Mike Beaver as Nelson, John Griffin as Wi-Fi
21	21	"Two Writers Make a Wrong"	Rob Schiller	Clayton Sakoda; Ian Weinreich	July 7, 2014	123	N/A
When Horace complains that comic book sales are down, Kaz and Oliver decide to join the comic book department, who they discover is just one guy named Ambrose. Kaz and Oliver discover his boring stories and convince him to embellish the stories just a little bit more. It works and Mighty Med regains its funds. However, all goes awry when Dark Warrior gets beaten by Dreadlock and stuffed into a hamburger and Kaz and Oliver change the ending to where Dark Warrior wins and Dreadlock looks like a fool. In anger, Dreadlock challenges Dark Warrior to a rematch. However, Dark Warrior must remain in the hospital, so Oliver takes his place. When Oliver fights Dreadlock, he discovers the villain sent his assistant, who had the same plan, to bluff his way through the fight, as Oliver. Worrying what comic book sales will do when this story gets released, Oliver makes one final embellishment, a cliffhanger, with Kaz and Ambrose's help. Meanwhile, upset that he's half normo, Alan believes he's pathetic, until Skylar says she's lost all of her powers, making her even more pathetic, so the two have a normolympics, hosted by Horace. The two compete in events such as 26-day TV watching, all-you-can-eat buffet snacking, and not saving a life. Alan wins when Skylar refuses to let Lizard Man remain trapped and Skylar worsens her score when she gives an impassioned speech about normos being heroes as well. However, the experience reminds her that she is still a hero. Guest stars: Carlos Lacámara as Horace, Ben Giroux as Dark Warrior, Elisha Yaffe as Bob, Oliver Muirhead as Ambrose, Bruno Gunn as Dreadlock
22	22	"Are You Afraid of the Shark?"	Adam Weissman	Vincent Brown	July 18, 2014	116	N/A
Horace asks Oliver and Skylar to pet-sit his dog, but when they arrive at the aquatic wing of Mighty Med, they realize Horace has a shark named Dawg. When Oliver gets scared by Dawg, he drops in a whole box of treats that cause Dawg to evolve into a man-shark. Dawg begins eating the hospital's patrons and Oliver and Skylar enlist Alan to help. They manage to lure Dawg back to the aquatic wing just as Horace arrives with his superior, Dr. Bridges. Oliver gives Dawg more treats that make him evolve into a man. Dr. Bridges allow Horace to keep his job based on the genetic research. Horace reveals that he's been trying to evolve Dawg for years and is extremely impressed. Meanwhile, due to a lack of income, Wallace and Clyde start making customers pay for everything, upsetting Kaz and Gus. Gus gets the idea to have his dad buy The Domain from Wallace and Clyde and turn it into a Chinese restaurant. Kaz gets the idea to have the health inspector shut it down, but somehow Gus passes. When the restaurant fails to generate income, Gus agrees to sell it back to Wallace and Clyde. Guest stars: Carlos Lacámara as Horace, Jason Sklar as Clyde, Randy Sklar as Wallace, Anjali Bhimani as Dr. Bridges, Tom Detrinis as Lysander Oglivy, Noah James Butler as British Dawg
23	23	"The Pen Is Mighty Med-ier than the Sword"	Stephen Engel	Amanda Steinhoff; Sarah Jeanne Terry	July 21, 2014	124	N/A
Kaz learns of a powerful device at Mighty Med known as the Pandorean, a pen that can make whatever it draws real. Horace uses the Pandorean to draw a pair of fusion forceps to save Valkira. Kaz steals the Pandorean to make a necklace for Stefanie, but puts it in his torn pocket. Back at the hospital, panic has ensued when the Pandorean is nowhere to be found and another pair of fusion forceps must be drawn to save Valkira. Horace explains that objects drawn with the Pandorean vanish after six hours, and right on cue, all of the fancy things Kaz has drawn vanish. Kaz discovers the Pandorean is missing and returns to the school to retrieve it. Meanwhile, Gus has found the Pandorean, but is oblivious to the drawings that become real behind him. One of the drawings is a battle monster for Gus' video game that goes after Kaz. Meanwhile, Skylar is upset that Oliver can cure every superhero in the hospital except her. Oliver then stays up all night using Incognito's serum to create a drink that will restore Skylar's power of invisibility. When it doesn't work, he lies and says it does. Skylar decides to stay invisible all day and Oliver must reluctantly play along. When Kaz calls for help, the two rush to school and help fight the monster. Kaz realizes that ripping up the drawings must also destroy the object. He chases after Gus and rips up his drawings one by one, inadvertently vanishing Oliver and Skylar's weapons. Eventually, the drawing and the monster are destroyed and Kaz brings the Pandorean back to Mighty Med, but learns that it was merely a backup for the real one in Horace's pocket and it vanishes shortly thereafter. Horace used the real Pandorean to save Valkira. Skylar then reveals to Oliver that she knew all along his serum didn't work and tells him to be honest with her from now on. Also starring: Augie Isaac as Gus Guest stars: Carlos Lacámara as Horace, Brooke Sorensen as Stefanie Absent: Devan Leos as Alan Diaz
24	24	"There's a Storm Coming"	Rich Correll	Jim Bernstein; Andy Schwartz	September 15, 2014	125	0.75
It has been nearly one year since Skylar, Kaz, and Oliver became friends and Kaz and Oliver throw a party to celebrate their friendship. However, the boys learn not only is Skylar in danger of losing her powers forever, but she will also die. The boys help Skylar, and in order for Skylar to reclaim her powers, she has to fight her nemesis, the Annihilator. At the same time, Wallace and Clyde trick Alan into getting them the other half of the Dyad of Nebulon which they use to become Catastrophe as he plans to get revenge on Horace. During the fight against the Annihilator, Megahertz and Experion show up to fight after escaping from Mighty Max Prison. The boys, Skylar and Alan must work together to stop a deadly villain infestation, prevent the Annihilator from keeping Skylar's powers, and keep Mighty Med and also Horace from being destroyed forever. Catastrophe captures Horace but Alan steals the dyad and destroys it. Experion, Megahertz, Wallace and Clyde are later arrested by Mighty Med Agents and are placed in the Mighty Max Prison. In a twist ending, it is revealed that the Annihilator had tampered with Skylar's powers during their battle to make her serve him. Also starring: Augie Isaac as Gus Guest stars: Carlos Lacámara as Horace, Jason Sklar as Clyde, Randy Sklar as Wallace, Chase Austin as Experion, James Ryen as Megahertz, Jeremy Howard as Philip, Derek Mears as Catastrophe

=== Season 2 (2014–15) ===
No. overall	No. in season	Title	Directed by	Written by	Original release date	Prod. code	U.S. viewers (millions)
25	1	"How the Mighty Med Have Fallen" "How the Mighty Med Has Fallen"	Rich Correll	Jim Bernstein; Andy Schwartz	October 20, 2014	201–202	0.64
Picking up right after the first season finale, Kaz and Oliver are trapped in the ER by an evil Skylar and the Annihilator. The two villains plan to take over the hospital and, eventually, the world. In the end, all the superheroes arrive and overpower Skylar and the Annihilator. Skylar turns back time using a tube of powers and pretends she isn't evil at the previous time where the staff find out she's evil. Guest stars: Carlos Lacámara as Horace, Cozi Zuehlsdorff as Jordan, James Ryen as Megahertz, Chris Elwood as Titanio, David Sobolov as the voice of the Annihilator, Morgan Benoit as the Annihilator
26	2	"Lair, Lair"	Rich Correll	Mark Jordan Legan; Vincent Brown	October 24, 2014	203	0.27
Oliver and Kaz attempt to visit the Annihilator's lair to take his collection of superpowers and restore them to the superheroes, but they end up trapped in space by a still evil Skylar. Meanwhile, Alan insists on attending his first normo Halloween party. In the end, a super-heroine with the power to freeze solid objects is turned evil by the corrupted Skylar. Guest stars: Carlos Lacámara as Horace, Jeremy Howard as Philip, Jilon VanOver as Tecton, Ben Giroux as Dark Warrior, David Sobolov as the voice of the Annihilator, Morgan Benoit as the Annihilator
27	3	"Mighty Mole"	Rob Schiller	Clayton Sadoka; Ian Weinreich	November 3, 2014	204	0.69
Kaz and Oliver discover that there's a mole working for the Annihilator and turning superheroes evil for the villain after Neocortex tells them that he was attacked by two superheroes. While Agent Blaylock is on the case, Oliver tries to prove that Alan is the mole. In the end, they find out that Skylar is the mole after she turns Agent Blaylock into a statue. Meanwhile, Skylar is having trouble keeping the fact that she's working for the Annihilator a secret, especially from Horace. Guest stars: Carlos Lacámara as Horace, Windell D. Middlebrooks as Agent Blaylock, Mike Bradecich as Neocortex, David Sobolov as the voice of the Annihilator, Morgan Benoit as the Annihilator Absent: Augie Isaac as Gus
28	4	"The Claw Prank Redemption"	Rob Schiller	Stephen Engel; Vincent Brown	November 10, 2014	205	0.57
Kaz and Oliver worry about what Skylar has planned for them now that they know she's evil. While they try to keep it under wraps, things get significantly more complicated when Skylar invites Oliver to the school dance. Oliver begins to believe Skylar isn't really evil, but Kaz, still not convinced, dresses up like a villain, No-Name, and feebly attempts to "take over" Mighty Med so he'll get thrown in Mighty Max prison. In Mighty Max, Kaz's cellmates are none other than Wallace and Clyde. The twins inform him that Skylar is indeed evil and the Annihilator and Skylar want to kill Oliver and destroy Philadelphia. The way Oliver might be able to lift Skylar from her evil spell is with a kiss, but when Kaz hangs up, the twins realize they got the spell mixed up with Sleeping Beauty and Oliver will die if he kisses Skylar. Kaz then tells new guard Philip to release him so he can save Oliver. Meanwhile, Alan decides to delve further into his normo roots and begins going to Logan High. Alan tries to control his anger problem, but he is caught in the crossfire when Gus and Jordan have a prank war, in which he is drenched in hot popcorn and lifted and dropped from a huge metal claw. Jordan crosses the line and snags his sweater vest, causing Alan to lose control and morph into a pig in a sweater vest. However, Gus and Jordan think he pranked the rival school by stealing their mascot and putting it in a sweater vest. Alan is declared King of Pranks as a result. Elsewhere, Skylar doesn't want Oliver to die, but the Annihilator orders it, so Skylar is forced to kiss Oliver and kill him, but is stopped when Alan in pig form runs between them. Skylar lies for Oliver by telling the Annihilator he is dead. Guest stars: Cozi Zuehlsdorff as Jordan, Randy Sklar as Wallace, Jason Sklar as Clyde, Jeremy Howard as Philip, David Sobolov as the voice of the Annihilator, Morgan Benoit as the Annihilator
29	5	"Do You Want to Build a Lava-Man?"	Jody Margolin Hahn	Stephen Engel; Mark Jordan Legan	December 1, 2014	206	0.59
Kaz and Oliver feverishly search The Domain for any information that can help them defeat the Annihilator. When Oliver finds the first Annihilator comic book, telling how Hapax the Elder mentored the Annihilator as a boy, training him to become a superhero, but his anger at being called a freak turned him to a super-villain, Kaz decides to find Hapax on Skylar's home planet, Caldera, to convince the mentor to come back to Earth and defeat the Annihilator. The boys steal the wormhole generator from Horace's desk and travel to Caldera. Once there, Kaz and Oliver find identical Skylar Calderians, as well as Skylar's pet doringbosh, who has a resemblance of Gus. It leads them to Hapax's cave and they find that Hapax bears a striking resemblance to Alan. Back on Earth, in Mighty Med, Optimo reveals he's coming to the hospital for a rash, but really just wants to see Alan. However, Horace discovers that the rash actually is serious and will kill Optimo within 10 minutes unless Alan donates some super-erythrocytes. Horace scrambles to keep Alan from seeing Optimo, and when Horace asks Alan to donate, he faints at the needle, allowing Horace to take the erythrocytes and cure Optimo. Meanwhile, Hapax is reluctant to return to Earth, and says if the boys can recover the Box of Azimuth, he'll accompany them. Kaz, Oliver, and the doringbosh make it up the volcano and fight the guardian, an old lady who breathes lava. The doringbosh sacrifices himself to knock the guardian into the lava pit and Kaz and Oliver recover the box and successfully prove their bravery to Hapax, who reveals the box just contains something to hold up his coffee table. He agrees to accompany them. As he leaves to get something, Skylar and the Annihilator arrive via space portal and ambush the boys. Guest stars: Carlos Lacámara as Horace, Mike Beaver as Optimo, Irene Roseen as Dracaina, Morgan Benoit as the Annihilator
30	6	"Storm's End"	Jody Margolin Hahn	Jim Bernstein; Andy Schwartz	January 5, 2015	207	N/A
Picking up from where "Do You Want to Build a Lava-Man?" left off, Kaz, Oliver, and Hapax are trapped by the Annihilator and Skylar. Hapax battles the Annihilator, using their mutant powers against each other. When Hapax appears to lose, Oliver grabs the Annihilator's power cannon and threatens to kill the Annihilator if Skylar doesn't surrender. To everyone's surprise, Skylar saves Oliver the trouble by appearing to kill the Annihilator herself, then announcing that she wants to rule the whole universe, with Kaz and Oliver as her evil minion friends by her side, but the reappearance of the doringbosh allows Kaz, Oliver, and a weak Hapax to escape. Out in the desert, Kaz and Oliver argue about what to do next, as Kaz now believes Skylar is beyond rescue and brutally tells Oliver that a future with Skylar isn't possible. Skylar catches the trio, but Oliver weakens her with a lump of coal. Hapax drains Skylar of her powers, turning her back to normal. However, the Annihilator, having survived Skylar's blast, weakly attempts one final act of revenge and shoots Skylar with a shot of stolen Black Widower's poison. Hapax kills the Annihilator, which sends out a blast that turns every infected superhero good again, but Skylar is now in danger of dying. Hapax transports the boys and Skylar back to Mighty Med, where the doctors try to save Skylar, but it's too late and Skylar dies. Kaz and Oliver plead with Horace to do something, so Horace uses a unique power to bring Skylar back to life. When Kaz and Oliver question him, Horace tells them that the only one who can bring people back to life is Caduceo, the Legendary Healer of Superheroes. Horace reveals that he is Caduceo and that he has five lives he can bring back, now down to one. Meanwhile, after the Annihilator saw Oliver alive on Caldera, Skylar allowed him to think that Caduceo was responsible for saving Oliver. The brainwashed Tecton and Blue Tornado arrive at The Domain to seek a legendary mirror to drain Caduceo's powers. Unbeknownst to them, Gus and Jordan are now running The Domain, and Jordan sees Tecton land and transform. Unable to convince Gus, Jordan displays a Kaz-and-Oliver like knowledge of superheroes to prove that the visitor is Tecton. When she hits Tecton in the leg with a spear, he seems genuinely hurt and Jordan believes she was mistaken. When Gus and Jordan's backs are turned, Tecton heals himself easily. He then requests the mirror from Gus, who breaks it, trying to prove a point. Angry, Tecton picks up the couch to throw it from behind at Gus when Hapax's blast pulse turns him back to normal. He puts the couch down, but Gus now thinks he knows Tecton from somewhere. Guest stars: Carlos Lacámara as Horace, Cozi Zuehlsdorff as Jordan, Jilon VanOver as Tecton, David Sobolov as the voice of the Annihilator, Morgan Benoit as the Annihilator
31	7	"Future Tense"	Jon Rosenbaum	Clayton Sakoda; Ian Weinreich	January 12, 2015	209	N/A
Kaz from the future visits the boys to stop Oliver from becoming a villain. Future Kaz later turns into a villain. Skylar tries to make everyone at Mighty Med like her again. However, Alan, enjoying not being hated at the hospital, tries to sabotage her plans, which makes the hospital reaffirm their hatred. Skylar catches on to his ruse one day and tells Alan of her plan to give hurtful presents to everyone; e.g., a video of bridges being demolished for Horace, and a big hat for Philip, who is already self-conscious about his head. When Alan tells her that people will hate her more than they already do, she tells him she doesn't care that she will lose her friendships with everyone, already having a lot of bad stuff happen to her. Alan feels remorseful, and when Skylar gathers everyone to give the presents to them, Alan runs in and ruins all of her presents by stepping on them and throwing them on the ground. As a result, everyone in the hospital hates Alan again, and Skylar thanks him, having realized why he destroyed the presents on purpose. Guest stars: Jeremy Howard as Philip, Kevin Linehan as future Kaz Absent: Augie Isaac as Gus
32	8	"Stop Bugging Me"	Jon Rosenbaum	Mark Jordan Legan; Vincent Brown	March 4, 2015	208	0.51
Oliver leaves Mighty Med to go work on a science project and Kaz stays back, but when Captain Atomic arrives injured by the villain Ballistic, Oliver is hesitant to leave Mighty Med because he doesn't want Kaz to be alone because of his irresponsibility and dumb tendencies that might wreak havoc on Captain Atomic. Kaz convinces Oliver to go to the school to work on the project and Kaz surprisingly doesn't cause chaos. When Oliver comes back to Mighty Med because he realized he forgot his things when he went to the school, Kaz gets angry and calls Oliver a control freak. Oliver then turns on a security camera so he can watch after Kaz. He then sees a busheon beetle, a dangerous alien bug that will kill Kaz. When Oliver goes to Mighty Med, Kaz reveals he set the whole thing up because he knew Oliver was spying on him and had the hero Replicate transform into a busheon beetle. A real busheon Beetle appears and bites Oliver. Kaz then recruits the nurses to help save Oliver and then has Captain Atomic save Oliver, Oliver then apologizes to Kaz and they make up. Meanwhile, Skylar wants to do her idea for the energy project that she, Oliver, Alan, and Gus are doing, but Oliver insists on his idea. When they test out Skylar's idea, it fails, but Oliver's works. Although it gets tested before Oliver comes back, Oliver, learning that he is a control freak, destroys the project without realizing that it had worked. Guest star: Bradley Dodds as Captain Atomic
33	9	"Less than Hero"	Jon Rosenbaum	Jim Bernstein; Mark Jordan Legan	March 11, 2015	210	0.51
When Kaz and Alan go on a mission to help one of the superheroes in the Amazonian Rainforest, they get attacked by the villain Ambush, and it is up to Oliver and Skylar to save them. Guest stars: Carlos Lacámara as Horace, Brian Kimmet as Fred, Mustafa Shakir as Ambusher
34	10	"Oliver Hatches the Eggs"	Linda Mendoza	Stephen Engel; Vincent Brown	March 25, 2015	211	N/A
When the pregnant superhero Arachnia is admitted to the ER, Oliver must wear her egg sac and become the new host until he is ready to give birth to Arachnia's babies. At school, Kaz helps Oliver hide his "pregnancy". Guest stars: Carlos Lacámara as Horace, Brett Wagner as Hunter
35	11	"Sparks Fly"	Adam Weissman	Stephen Engel; Andy Schwartz	April 1, 2015	212	N/A
Spark makes a connection with Kaz. Horace puts Skylar in charge of security to keep villains out of Mighty Med. Guest stars: Carlos Lacámara as Horace, Jeremy Howard as Philip, Gianna Lepera as Spark, Morgan Benoit as Nightstrike Absent: Devan Leos as Alan Diaz
36	12	"Wallace and Clyde: A Grand Day Out"	Rich Correll	Jim Bernstein; Mark Jordan Legan	April 7, 2015	214	N/A
Horace allows Oliver to prove that Wallace and Clyde are no longer evil. Kaz finds out that Phillip has a pet camel named Camela Anderson. Kaz attempts to gain superpowers by drinking Camela's milk. While not paying attention, Camela eats medicine and begins shooting lasers. Guest stars: Carlos Lacámara as Horace, Jason Sklar as Clyde, Randy Sklar as Wallace, Patton Oswalt as Exterminator, Jeremy Howard as Philip Absent: Devan Leos as Alan Diaz, Augie Isaac as Gus
37	13	"The Key to Being a Hero"	Adam Weissman	Stephen Engel; Andy Schwartz	April 15, 2015	213	0.47
Oliver finds out his mother, Bridget, is dating Horace. Skylar receives the Key of Steel from the Key Keeper. Kaz tries to obtain the key from her so he can gain superpowers. Horace announces to Oliver that he and Bridget are engaged. Guest stars: Carlos Lacámara as Horace, Jamie Denbo as Bridget, Casey Campbell as Key Keeper, David Mattey as Slaughter Master Absent: Augie Isaac as Gus
38	14	"New Kids Are the Docs"	Stephen Engel	Kenny Byerly	July 1, 2015	219	0.27
Gulliver and Chaz get accepted into Mighty Med, which threatens Oliver and Kaz's chances of staying at Mighty Med. Meanwhile, Skylar sets up a hospital suggestion box. Guest stars: Carlos Lacámara as Horace, Harrison Boxley as Gulliver, Elliott Carr as Chaz
39	15	"It's a Matter of Principal"	Gregory Hobson	Stephen Engel; Vincent Brown	July 8, 2015	215	0.30
Jordan thinks that superheroes are real. Kaz and Oliver try to not let her find out about Mighty Med, when Captain Atomic becomes a substitute teacher. Gus finds radiation in the history teacher who is actually Captain Atomic. Captain Atomic gets fired by Principal Howard. Principal Howard kidnaps Jordan because he is part of a secret villain league and actually a robot. Captain Atomic fights Principal Howard, but he knocks out Jordan, who does not remember it later on. Meanwhile, Connie Valentine (Skylar) acts like she is a princess so Stefanie and Gus do not find out that she is really Skylar Storm. They end up in the fight between Captain Atomic and Principal Howard. Gus runs away from the fight. Stefanie hits Principal Howard with a shoe because she thinks he is a rebel trying to kill Connie. Connie tells Stefanie to wait in the schoolyard. Connie knights Stefanie as a Duchess in the schoolyard as long as Stefanie does not tell anybody about Connie's secret while Gus remains as her royal bodyguard. Guest stars: Cozi Zuehlsdorff as Jordan, Bradley Dodds as Captain Atomic, Brooke Sorenson as Stefanie, Matt Price as Principal Howard Absent: Devan Leos as Alan Diaz
40	16	"Living the Dream"	Shannon Flynn	Jim Bernstein; Andy Schwartz	July 15, 2015	216	0.39
Oliver is flung off a board at the school construction site. Oliver later has an unusual dream due to a strange rock he touched at the school construction site. Alan annoys Horace so that he can be his best man at his wedding. Horace asks Skylar to tell Alan that he does not want him to be his best man at his wedding. Skylar tells Alan that he is extremely annoying and relays Horace's message to Alan. Kaz is kidnapped by two lackeys who pretend to be movie producers, but Kaz is later saved by Oliver and Tecton. In the episode, Oliver uses the name Quimby Fletcher (a reference to his character's name on A.N.T. Farm, Fletcher Quimby) as his fake name to be featured in an issue of a comic book. Guest stars: Carlos Lacámara as Horace, Jilon VanOver as Tecton, John J. Joseph as Mort, Oliver Muirhead as Ambrose, Richard Epcar as the voice of Mr. Terror
41	17	"Lab Rats vs. Mighty Med"	Rich Correll	Teleplay by : Mark Brazill and Vincent Brown; Story by : Clayton Sakoda & Ian Weinreich	July 22, 2015	220	1.07
The bionic heroes—the Lab Rats, Kaz, Oliver, and Skylar Storm—team up to fight the Incapacitator. Adam, Bree, Oliver, and Skylar find and later fight the Incapacitator at the replica of the Eiffel Tower in Las Vegas, Nevada. Chase, Leo, and Kaz arrive later to help Adam, Bree, Oliver, and Skylar fight the Incapacitator. Kaz tricks the Incapacitator to absorb the proton energy and the hardware virus inside of Chase. After the Incapacitator absorbs the proton energy and the hardware virus inside of Chase, he explodes and is defeated. The Lab Rats say a heartfelt goodbye to Kaz, Oliver, and Skylar at Mighty Med Hospital. Bree and Skylar get over their crush on Oliver. The Lab Rats then return home. Starring: Billy Unger, Spencer Boldman, Kelli Berglund, Tyrel Jackson Williams, Hal Sparks Guest stars: Jilon VanOver as Tecton, Damion Poitier as Incapacitator, Carlos Lacámara as Horace Absent: Devan Leos as Alan Diaz, Augie Isaac as Gus Note: This is a combined special episode of both Lab Rats and Mighty Med.
42	18	"Thanks for the Memory Drives"	Rich Correll	Stephen Engel; Mark Jordan Legan	August 12, 2015	217	0.43
Following the events of Living the Dream, Kaz and Skylar try to find the memory drive so that they can find out the facts about the school principal, where he came from, and what type of villain he is. Meanwhile, Oliver is trying on outfits for the wedding of Horace and his mother. Later, it is revealed that the leader of the villains is Oliver's mother. Guest stars: Carlos Lacámara as Horace, Cozi Zuehlsdorff as Jordan, Jamie Denbo as Bridget, Matt Price as Principal Howard, John J. Joseph as Mort, Richard Epcar as the voice of Mr. Terror
43	19	"The Dirt on Kaz & Skylar"	Linda Mendoza	Amanda Steinhoff; Sarah Jeanne Terry	August 19, 2015	218	0.55
Following the events of Living the Dream, Kaz and Skylar search for the strange rock Oliver touched at the school construction site. The strange rock is known as the all-powerful Arcturion. The super villains are drawn towards the all-powerful Arcturion. Oliver wants to help Kaz and Skylar's search for the all-powerful Arcturion. Oliver asks Megahertz for his assistance. Megahertz convinces Oliver that he is no longer evil. Megahertz claims the prison rehabilitation program he is in is helping him rid himself of his evil desires. Megahertz protects Oliver from Mr. Terror's minions. Megahertz later turns on Oliver, Kaz, and Skylar. Megahertz attacks all three of them. Megahertz is sent back to prison. Oliver, Kaz, and Skylar successfully recover the all-powerful Arcturion. Guest stars: James Ryen as Megahertz, John J. Joseph as Mort, Matthew Jaeger as Alien Hologram Absent: Devan Leos as Alan Diaz
44	20	"The Mother of All Villains"	Rich Correll	Mark Jordan Legan; Vincent Brown; Jim Bernstein; Andy Schwartz	September 9, 2015	221–222	N/A
On the wedding day of Horace and Oliver's mother, Oliver is trying to unlock Mort's phone to get Mr. Terror's contact information. Meanwhile, it is revealed that Philip is from a planet called Baaaaahh. One of the scientists there created the Arcturion a thousand years ago. However, since it was too dangerous, they made a spaceship to destroy it by launching it into the nearest sun. However, Philip accidentally launched the spaceship, which subsequently crashed. Philip has never seen the Arcturion since then. Kaz suggests that if they can repair the engine then Philip could finally destroy the Arcturion. Later, Oliver discovers that his mother is Mr. Terror. She manages to get the Arcturion's power, but it kills her. Kaz and Skylar go to Caldera to bring Hapax, who can suck her power out, and then Horace can revive her. However, Horace arrives earlier and revives the still evil Bridget. Bridget reveals that she only wanted to marry Horace because she knew Horace is Caduceo. Bridget gets powers and becomes unstoppable. Everything went as Bridget had planned. All attempts to stop her fail. Kaz and Oliver discover they got the ability to fly because they touched the Arcturion when they tried to stop Bridget. Meanwhile, Alan gets a conversation with Optimo. Guest stars: Carlos Lacámara as Horace, Jamie Denbo as Bridget, Jeremy Howard as Philip, Devan Leos as Hapax, Mike Beaver as Optimo, John J. Joseph as Mort, David Mattey as Slaughter Master, Morgan Benoit as Nightstrike, Richard Epcar as the voice of Mr. Terror Note: This episode ends on an unresolved cliffhanger, leaving open the continuation for the spin-off series, Lab Rats: Elite Force.
