= List of Mighty Med characters =

Mighty Med is an American Disney XD original series which ran for two seasons, premiering on October 7, 2013, and running through September 9, 2015. The two main characters, Kaz and Oliver, are comic book fans who are offered the chance to become doctors in a secret hospital for superheroes. They are played by Bradley Steven Perry and Jake Short.

The series also features guest stars such as football player Adrian Peterson of the Minnesota Vikings and Patton Oswalt as an ex-villain called "The Exterminator".

== Main ==
- Kaz (portrayed by Bradley Steven Perry) is Oliver's best friend. He is lazy in school and, while devoted to Oliver, he will often try to get away with a shortcut that ends up getting both him and Oliver into trouble. While he seems stupid sometimes, he can unexpectedly come up with a smart solution to a problem. In the episode "The Mother of All Villains", Kaz and Oliver gain superpowers from exposure to the Arcturion.
- Oliver (portrayed by Jake Short) is Kaz's best friend and puts up with his flaws because he sees good in him. He is intelligent, sweet, and sarcastic, acting as a foil to Kaz. In "The Mother of All Villains", Oliver discovers that his mother Bridget is actually Mr. Terror. In addition, he and Kaz gain superpowers from exposure to the Arcturion.
- Skylar Storm (portrayed by Paris Berelc) is a superhero from the volcanic planet Caldera and Oliver's love interest. Besides having peak human condition, Skylar has 24 superpowers include X-ray vision, explosive induction, laser vision/heat vision, telekinesis, portal creation, gyrokinesis (the ability to manipulate gravity), manipulation of celestial bodies, size alteration, paralysis inducement, flight, super strength, intangibility, camouflage, invisibility, petrification, space survivability, and super speed. Skylar lost her superpowers and her invisible fling motorcycle in a battle against her nemesis, Annihilator, and is now a normo patient at Mighty Med, where she is working to find a way to regain her superpowers. In the first-season finale, Skylar regains her powers. However, she falls under Annihilator's control due to her tampering with them, giving her several more powers like the Kiss of Death. Oliver tricks Skylar into thinking that he has given up as Hapax removes the corrupted powers from her.
- Alan Diaz (portrayed by Devan Leos) is the nephew of Horace and possesses telekinetic abilities. He slightly dislikes Kaz and Oliver because of their status as normos, so he does everything in his power to get rid of them. Although there are some occasions where he helps Kaz and Oliver. In "Growing Pains", it is revealed that when Alan gets scared, he either turns into an animal or sprouts an animal body part. He also has the ability to turn other people into animals.
- Gus (portrayed by Augie Isaac) is Kaz and Oliver's friend, but is unaware of their secret job. He is very quirky, sometimes unlikable, and lacks normal social skills. Over time, Gus develops a crush on Jordan. Gus' character started out as recurring, but became a series regular in the second season. Throughout the whole series, it has been mentioned that his family is rich, even capable of buying The Domain.

== Recurring ==
- Jordan (portrayed by Cozi Zuehlsdorff) is Kaz and Oliver's friend and hates Gus. She is very negative. Just like Kaz and Oliver, she loves video games and comics.
- Stefanie (portrayed by Brooke Sorenson) is a popular girl at Logan High School.

== Mighty Med hospital staff ==
- Horace Diaz (portrayed by Carlos Lacámara) is the chief of staff of Mighty Med and Alan's maternal uncle. He has the power of freezing people and is a bit eccentric. In "Atomic Blast from the Past", he is revealed to be 3,006 years old and has never aged since 1953. Some even consider that he is immortal. In "Storm's End", it is revealed that Horace is actually Caduceo and can only restore life five times with the side effect of having him gain weight in the hips. He appears in most of the episodes, despite only having a guest star role.
- Benny (portrayed by Karan Soni) is a worker at Mighty Med and a superhero named What's His Face. He has super speed, but it only works when he runs backwards. In addition, Benny has the ability to throw objects in slow motion.
- Lizard Man (portrayed by Dirk Ellis) is a humanoid lizard who stays at Mighty Med because he does not fit anywhere else. He is a frequently recurring character seen as an employee at Mighty Med.
- Philip (portrayed by Jeremy Howard) is an alien doctor with a large head, though it is very small compared to other inhabitants of his planet. He appears to dislike almost everyone at Mighty Med, even Horace. In "The Claw Prank Redemption", it is revealed that Philip is the new security guard for Mighty Max. In "The Mother of All Villains", it is revealed that Philip is from the planet Baaaaahh and that his species created the Arcturion.
- The Newscaster (portrayed by Angela Martinez) is the unnamed news anchor for a news channel exclusively for superheroes that is shown on the televisions at Mighty Med.
- Ambrose (portrayed by Oliver Muirhead) is a member of Mighty Med's comic book department. He has the power to see visions of other heroes' lives, allowing him to write and illustrate incredibly fast.

== Superheroes ==
- Tecton (portrayed by Jilon VanOver) is Kaz's favorite superhero who is a parody of Superman and Hyperion. He has superhuman strength and speed as well as flight, immunity to pain, and the ability to cause tectonic activity with a stomp of his foot. He is also capable of healing at a rapid rate, but if exposed to a gas that only exists when delta radiation mixes with gold, he will not be able to heal.
- Solar Flare (portrayed by Carly Hollas) is a female superhero with pyrokinesis. Although the most recurring of the superheroes, Solar Flare has yet to have a speaking role.
- Incognito is an invisible superhero. Nobody knew what he looked like until the episode "Copy Kaz". His appearance is a white-faced human with silver clothing, ginger hair, and an eye-patch.
- Blue Tornado (portrayed by Brett Johnson) is a superhero with atmosphere manipulation, which allows him to spin at the speed of sound and shoot lightning from his hands.
- The Crusher (portrayed by Jeffrey James Lippold) is the strongest man in the universe, capable of hurling someone across a room just by giving them a high-five. He was the first superhero to have his life saved by Kaz and Oliver, in which they shocked his feet to give him cardiac aid. According to Tecton, his real name is Glenn Crushman. Near the end of the first season, the Crusher gets married; however, his wife does not like him doing anything dangerous.
- Brain Matter (portrayed by Napoleon Ryan as a human and Troy Brenna as a monster) was once a hero with superhuman intelligence, which he used to create weapons, but he grew envious of superheroes with other powers. He created a serum that would give him more powers, but the experiment backfired and went horribly wrong—the serum turned him into a large, blue-skinned monster with super-strength and the desire to eat brains. Brain Matter reappears in "Growing Pains" where he has been cured of the serum and given all the powers he intended to give himself, along with the ability to alter the age of any living thing.
- Titanio (portrayed by Chris Elwood) was a test pilot turned aero space engineer who is also a billionaire. He became Titanio to battle the forces of evil. He has no powers, but he has a robotic suit with a stun ray, a jet pack, and strength boosters like Iron Man.
- Mesmera (portrayed by Tiphani Abney) is a female superhero who has an eye on the palm of her right hand that can hypnotize anyone.
- Citadel is a superhero with indestructible skin who can deflect magnetic fields. Citadel first appeared in "Sm'oliver's Travels", where he had stomach pains. Due to his indestructible skin, surgery could not be performed on him, so Oliver was shrunken and sent inside his body to remove the source of the pain.
- The Great Defender (portrayed by Dwight Howard) is from another planet, like Skylar. His suit is indestructible and his powers consist of ice ball projection, superhuman strength, and spinning things at high speed on his fingertips like a basketball. Despite being six feet and 11 inches, he is the shortest person on his planet.
- Captain Atomic (portrayed by Bradley Dodds) was hit by a radioactive bullet in the 1950s, but survived thanks to the lucky yo-yo given to him by his girlfriend. Captain Atomic has the power of flight and can infuse atomic power into his yo-yo, allowing him to use it as a shield and a whip. Atomic attempted to stop an intergalactic war in 1953, but a mishap trapped him in a wormhole for 61 years. In the present, the wormhole was opened by Oliver. After he was given a new battery to help him survive and defeating the Black Falcon, Captain Atomic decided to stick around in the present.
- Mr. Quick (portrayed by Demetris Hartman) is a superhero with super speed.
- Owl Girl (portrayed by Erica Arrias) is an owl-themed female superhero who can fly and is good at hand-to-hand combat.
- Timeline (portrayed by Carlos Lacámara) is Horace's cousin, though they do not get along. He can see into the future and temporarily freeze time. He appeared in "It's Not the End of the World", where he came to Mighty Med because his powers were acting up.
- Gray Granite (portrayed by Mike O'Hearn) is a rock-based superhero who was first seen in "Evil Gus".
- Neocortex (portrayed by Mike Bradecich) is a telepathic superhero who can communicate mentally, alter one's personality, link minds, and put people into dreams and nightmares. Neocortex also has neuron-manipulation, which means he can send out psychic bursts that can immobilize a villain or control their behavior.
- Surge (portrayed by Dirk Ellis) is a superhero who can generate and control electricity.
- Absolute Zero is a superhero who can generate and control ice.
- Snowstorm (portrayed by Pernilla Nylander) is a female superhero who can generate and control ice. At some point the Annihilator stole her powers and left her helpless. He took them and placed them on his trophy shelf with all the others. Later she was attacked by her nemesis and left in critical condition. She was taken to Mighty Med, but without her powers to save her, she would die. Kaz and Oliver manage to restore her powers.
- Jade/Remix (portrayed by Debby Ryan) was once an average, self-centered rock star who first appeared in "Guitar Superhero". During one of her concerts, Jade was covered with yak's milk lotion irradiated by sunlight. When she strummed her guitar with her tongue, the electric shock gave her flight, energy projection, and force field projection. With Kaz and Oliver's help, she learned what it meant to be a hero and became the superhero Remix.
- Spotlight (portrayed by Ben Schreen) is a superhero who can shoot beams of light and can teleport.
- Alley Cat (portrayed by Alina Andrei) is a cat-themed superhero with nine lives.
- Agent Blaylock (portrayed by Windell D. Middlebrooks) is a member of the Secret Superhero Service Division who can become intangible. In "Mighty Mole", Agent Blaylock looks for a mole in Mighty Med when one is suspected of helping the Annihilator. When he finds that it is Skylar, Blaylock is petrified by Skylar.
- Optimo (portrayed by Mike Beaver) is an undercover telekinetic superhero who is part of the Super Secret Heroes in Hiding. He is Alan's father and Horace's brother-in-law. In "Do You Want to Build a Lava Man?", Optimo visits Horace to be cured of a virus that will turn him into goo.
- Dark Warrior (portrayed by Ben Giroux) is a parody of Batman who uses a voice modulator to speak. Even though Dark Warrior appears tall, he has raised parts in his boots; his real height has him near the same size as Oliver. He wields a utility belt which contains various weapons and gadgets. He has a dark, corrupt personality and he has a tendency to break that character.
- Valkira is a valkyrie-themed superhero.
- Gamma Girl is a gamma-powered superhero who can manipulate gamma energy.
- Amicus (voiced by Matt Nolan) is a dog-like superhero.
- Harold is Amicus' pet human.
- Bubble Man is bubble-themed superhero who first appeared in "There's a Storm Coming", popping in and out of Skylar's party to eat chips. He is not liked by Alan.
- Hapax (portrayed by Devan Leos) is a mutant human who taught the Annihilator how to use his powers. His powers include climate adaptions, age reversal, telekinesis, energy projection, life force absorption, and teleporting.
- Dynamo is a superhero whose power canister was seen on the Annihilator's shelf. Dynamo first appears in person in the episode "Future Tense".
- Human Blade is a superhero with rotating fan blades for hands. In "Future Tense", Skylar hires Human Blade to make smoothies for the superheroes so that they would stop hating her for having been used as the Annihilator's servant. Alan uses Surge to charge Human Blade, which results in Lizard Man's tail and Solar Flare's pony tail getting chopped off.
- Scarlet Ace is a superhero. She is first mentioned in "There's a Storm Coming", when her power canister was seen on the Annihilator's shelf in his lair. After this episode, she was not seen until "Mighty Mole".
- Disgusto (portrayed by Bud Galloway) is a smelly superhero.
- Queen Hornet (portrayed by Bethany Levy) is a hornet-themed superhero. She came to Mighty Med in "Stop Bugging Me", where she was affected by the chemicals used by an exterminator.
- Replicate is a shape-shifting superhero who appeared in "Stop Bugging Me".
- Gravitas is a superhero. He was once injured by Ambush in "Less than Hero".
- Lady Spectrum is a rainbow-themed superhero who was originally seen as Nurse Gladis. She first appeared in "Less than Hero", where she was impaled by Harpooner. After the program that auditions possible superheroes was terminated, Lady Spectrum cheers up Skylar by making a rainbow for her.
- The Skipper (portrayed by Brian Kimmet) is an ambulance driver who came to Mighty Med in "Less than Hero" in hopes of becoming a superhero. He was ultimately rejected when he failed to demonstrate his power of super speed. When he let Kaz drive the invisible ambulance, Kaz made him a superhero as an award.
- Arachnia (portrayed by Jasmine Delaney) is a spider-themed alien superhero who can weave strong webs.
- Spark (portrayed by Gianna LePera) is a teenage superhero whose mother was hit with gamma rays while orbiting around Mars, causing Spark to be born with superhuman physical attributes, flight, electrokinesis, and limited gravity manipulation.

== Supervillains ==
- The Annihilator (portrayed by Morgan Benoit and voiced by David Sobolov) is an armored supervillain who is the main archenemy of Skylar, Kaz and Oliver. He was once a human named Neil Gundenhauser who developed superpowers and was tormented and teased for being a freak. He was trained by Hapax to be a superhero, which did not go as Hapax planned. He keeps a trophy of the superpowers and weapons he steals from defeated superheroes. The Annihilator is responsible for stealing Skylar's powers and her invisible motorcycle in an ambush.
- Wallace and Clyde (portrayed by Randy Sklar and Jason Sklar) are owners of The Domain and want to destroy the superheroes at Mighty Med and get revenge on Horace. In "Copy Kaz", it is revealed that Wallace and Clyde were once a being called Catastrophe (portrayed by Derek Mears), the most powerful villain in the galaxy. Catastrophe was eventually defeated by Horace and divided into two pathetic humans with little power. When apart or together, Wallace and Clyde can disintegrate anything. Dr. Diaz puts Oliver in charge of reforming Wallace and Clyde, which they eventually succeed in.
- Megahertz (portrayed by James Ryen) is a human/titanium cyborg forged in a freak accident at a power plant and Tecton's nemesis. Like his name suggests, Megahertz has high voltage electric abilities. If he uses his powers too much, he has to go back to the power plant where he became Megahertz and recharge.
- Micros (portrayed by Adam Leadbeater) is a supervillain who can make himself microscopic. He is the archenemy of Citadel, where he stated that Citadel stole his girlfriend in college. When he was inside Citadel, he used a laser gun and utility saw to try to destroy the superhero from inside. He used both of these to try to kill Oliver as well.
- Crimson Demon (portrayed by Douglas Tait) is a demonic supervillain who wields a fire staff that shoots fireballs. His brothers, Blue Demon, White Demon, and Matt Demon, were imprisoned in a lower dimension by Tecton where Crimson Demon plotted to free them.
- Experion (portrayed by Chase Austin) is a former superhero and Skylar's former childhood friend from the planet Caldera. He appeared in the episode "The Friend of My Friend Is My Enemy", supposedly attempting to restore Skylar's powers, but in truth, he had actually turned to the dark side and was attempting to bring her to the Annihilator. His powers are magnetism and gravokinesis.
- Black Falcon (portrayed by Scott Anthony Leet) is a villain who can fly and shoot deadly energy blasts. He has a staff that can enhance his powers, which serves as his main weapon of choice. In "How the Mighty Med Have Fallen", it was revealed that Black Falcon was turned into a limited action figure by Mighty Max's Chamber of Certain Destruction.
- Dr. Wrath is a shapeshifting supervillain who feeds off negative energy. No one knew what Dr. Wrath really looked like due to them always wearing a cloak and being a shapeshifter. They arrived at Logan High School where they shapeshifted into Stefanie and impersonated her, spreading negative energy to strengthen them while building a machine that would make the whole world negative. Kaz and Skylar end up getting captured, but manage to break free, and Skylar confronts and fights Dr. Wrath, while Kaz alters the machine. However, Dr. Wrath proves too powerful for Skylar and the machine activates. However, due to Kaz's alterations, instead of creating negativity, it created positive elements, disintegrating Dr. Wrath.
- Sonic Shriek (portrayed by Marcus Giamatti) was originally an inventor who tried to make limitless energy out of sound, but one of his inventions malfunctioned and he gained super powers. After that, he vowed to destroy any monument named after an inventor, regardless of how many lives were destroyed in the process.
- Revengeance is a supervillain who became a disembodied cloud following a battle with Tecton. Revengeance plans on regaining his physical form and conquering the world. He has flight and mind control, allowing him to possess others.
- Disembowler is a re-retired supervillain with knives for fingers who first appeared in "Lockdown", where he is part of Wallace's intervention to get Clyde to give up his evil ways.
- Soul Slayer (portrayed by Scott Connors) is Titanio's nemesis. Soul Slayer has energy projection and teleportation.
- Wi-Fi (portrayed by John Griffin) is a supervillain who wants to steal all of Mighty Med's secrets and share them with the rest of the supervillains except for Counterfeit. He has the power to go into computers, which is how he attempts to steal Mighty Med's secrets.
- Dreadlock (portrayed by Bruno Gunn) is Dark Warrior's nemesis. Dreadlock designs weapons that counteract his nemesis' weapons.
- Bob (portrayed by Elisha Yaffe) is Dreadlock's henchman. He had to battle Oliver in Dreadlock's place when Dreadlock had a stomach virus.
- The Ambusher (portrayed by Mustafa Shakir) is a supervillain who has super strength and is an expert chemist. In "Less than Hero", he injured Gravitas and had come up with a chemical to destroy all plant life in the Amazon Rainforest.
- Hunter Bounty (portrayed by Brett Wagner) is a notorious bounty hunter known throughout seven galaxies.
- Nightstrike (portrayed by Morgan Benoit) is the nemesis of Spark. He is capable of teleporting and summoning weapons.
- Slaughter Master (portrayed by David Mattey) is a supervillain with super-strength and flight who wields the Hammer of Achelon.
- Mr. Terror (portrayed by Jamie Denbo and voiced by Richard Epcar) is a mysterious crime lord and evil genius who wears a black mask over his entire face. Mr. Terror's true identity is Oliver's overbearing mother Bridget, who uses a voice modulator to disguise her voice. Her plan is to obtain the Arcturion so she can become the most powerful villain in existence.
- Mort (portrayed by John J. Joseph) is a reptilian minion of Mr. Terror.
