= Vanover =

Vanover or VanOver is a surname. Notable people with the surname include:

- Jilon VanOver (born 1978), American actor
- Larry Vanover (born 1955), American baseball umpire
- Roscoe Vanover (1863–1927), American judge
- Tamarick Vanover (born 1974), American football player
