= It's a Laugh Productions =

American television production company

It's a Laugh Productions, Inc.
- Logo used since 2019
- Type: Subsidiary
- Industry: Film; Television
- Genre: Teen sitcoms and Sketch comedy
- Founded: November 3, 2003; 23 years ago
- Founder: Don Mink; Amy Rabins
- Headquarters: Studio City, Los Angeles, California, US
- Parent: Disney Kids & Family

It's a Laugh Productions, Inc. is an American production company owned by The Walt Disney Company which produces live-action teen sitcoms and sketch comedies airing on Disney Channel and Disney XD. It is a division of Disney Kids & Family.

With the notable exception of Jonas, most shows are produced and filmed before a live studio audience using a multi-camera setup, and released with a laugh track. While production takes place mostly at Hollywood Center Studios, other locations, such as Sunset Bronson Studios (as is the case for Hannah Montana), The Burbank Studios and Los Angeles Center Studios, have also been used.

== History ==
The 2009 version of the logo of It's a Laugh Productions, used until 2020.

It's a Laugh Productions, Inc. was founded on November 3, 2003, by Don Mink and Amy Rabins, former talent agents of Brookwell McNamara Entertainment.

== Filmography ==
=== Television ===
#	Name	Creator(s)	Co-production with	Premiere date	End date	No. of episodes	Network
1	That's So Raven	Michael Poryes; Susan Sherman	Brookwell McNamara Entertainment (seasons 1–3); That So Productions (season 4); Warren & Rinsler Productions (season 4)	January 17, 2003	November 10, 2007	100	Disney Channel
2	The Suite Life of Zack & Cody	Danny Kallis; Jim Geoghan		March 18, 2005	September 1, 2008	87	Disney Channel
3	Hannah Montana	Michael Poryes; Rich Correll; Barry O'Brien	Michael Poryes Productions	March 24, 2006	January 16, 2011	98	Disney Channel
4	Cory in the House	Dennis Rinsler; Marc Warren	Warren & Rinsler Productions	January 12, 2007	September 12, 2008	34	Disney Channel
5	Wizards of Waverly Place	Todd J. Greenwald		October 12, 2007	January 6, 2012	106	Disney Channel
6	The Suite Life on Deck	Danny Kallis; Jim Geoghan	Danny Kallis Productions (seasons 1–2); Bon Mot Productions (season 3)	September 26, 2008	May 6, 2011	71	Disney Channel
7	Sonny with a Chance	Steve Marmel	Varsity Pictures	February 8, 2009	January 2, 2011	47	Disney Channel
8	Jonas	Michael Curtis; Roger S. H. Schulman	Mantis Productions (season 1)	May 2, 2009	October 3, 2010	34	Disney Channel
9	I'm in the Band	Michael B. Kaplan; Ron Rappaport		November 27, 2009	December 9, 2011	41	Disney XD
10	Good Luck Charlie	Phil Baker; Drew Vaupen		April 4, 2010	February 16, 2014	97	Disney Channel
11	Pair of Kings	Dan Cross; David Hoge		September 10, 2010	February 18, 2013	67	Disney XD
12	Shake It Up	Chris Thompson		November 7, 2010	November 10, 2013	75	Disney Channel
13	A.N.T. Farm	Dan Signer	Gravy Boat Productions	May 6, 2011	March 21, 2014	62	Disney Channel
14	So Random!	Steve Marmel	Varsity Pictures	June 5, 2011	March 25, 2012	26	Disney Channel
15	Kickin' It	Jim O'Doherty	Poor Soul	June 13, 2011	March 25, 2015	84	Disney XD
16	Jessie	Pamela Eells O'Connell	Bon Mot Productions	September 30, 2011	October 16, 2015	98	Disney Channel
17	Austin & Ally	Kevin Kopelow; Heath Seifert	Kevin & Heath Productions	December 2, 2011	January 10, 2016	87	Disney Channel
18	Lab Rats	Chris Peterson; Bryan Moore		February 27, 2012	February 3, 2016	89	Disney XD
19	Crash & Bernstein	Eric Friedman		October 8, 2012	August 11, 2014	39	Disney XD
20	Dog with a Blog	Michael B. Kaplan; Philip Stark	Diphthong Productions	October 12, 2012	September 25, 2015	69	Disney Channel
21	Liv and Maddie	John D. Beck; Ron Hart	Beck & Hart Productions; Oops Doughnuts Productions	July 19, 2013	March 24, 2017	80	Disney Channel
22	Mighty Med	Jim Bernstein; Andy Schwartz		October 7, 2013	September 9, 2015	44	Disney XD
23	I Didn't Do It	Tod Himmel; Josh Silverstein	That's Not So Funny Productions (season 2)	January 17, 2014	October 16, 2015	39	Disney Channel
24	Girl Meets World	Michael Jacobs; April Kelly	Michael Jacobs Productions	June 27, 2014	January 20, 2017	72	Disney Channel
25	K.C. Undercover	Corinne Marshall	Rob Lotterstein Productions	January 18, 2015	February 2, 2018	75	Disney Channel
26	Best Friends Whenever	Jed Elinoff; Scott Thomas	Diphthong Productions (season 1); Entertainment Force	June 26, 2015	December 11, 2016	30	Disney Channel
27	Gamer's Guide to Pretty Much Everything	Devin Bunje; Nick Stanton	Poor Soul; 37 Monkeys (season 2)	July 22, 2015	January 2, 2017	37	Disney XD
28	Bunk'd	Pamela Eells O'Connell	Bon Mot Productions (seasons 1–3); That's Not So Funny Productions (season 4); A Little Too You (seasons 5–7)	July 31, 2015	August 2, 2024	161	Disney Channel
29	Lab Rats: Elite Force	Chris Peterson; Bryan Moore	Britelite Productions	March 2, 2016	October 22, 2016	15	Disney XD
30	Bizaardvark	Kyle Stegina; Josh Lehrman		June 24, 2016	April 13, 2019	63	Disney Channel
31	Raven's Home	Michael Poryes; Susan Sherman	Entertainment Force (seasons 1, 5–6); November 13 (season 2); Done Deal Productions (season 2); Funny Boone Productions (season 3; episodes 1–14); Institute for Individual Education (season 3; episodes 15–season 4)	July 21, 2017	September 3, 2023	122	Disney Channel
32	Coop & Cami Ask the World	Boyce Bugliari; Jamie McLaughlin	Bugliari/McLaughlin Productions	October 12, 2018	September 11, 2020	49	Disney Channel
33	Sydney to the Max	Mark Reisman	Mark Reisman Productions	January 25, 2019	November 26, 2021	63	Disney Channel
34	The Villains of Valley View	Chris Peterson; Bryan Moore	Britelite Productions	June 3, 2022	December 1, 2023	37	Disney Channel
35	Wizards Beyond Waverly Place (season 1 only)	Todd J. Greenwald	Entertainment Force; Potato Monkey Productions	October 29, 2024	February 28, 2025	21	Disney Channel

=== Films ===
==== Theatrical films ====
#	Title	Director	Writer	Producer(s)	Release date	Budget	Gross	RT	IMDb
1	Hannah Montana: The Movie	Peter Chelsom	Dan Berendsen	David Blocker; Billy Ray Cyrus; Alfred Gough; Miles Millar; Steven Peterman; Michael Poryes	April 10, 2009	$30 million	$169.2 million	44%	4.5

==== Television films ====
#	Title	Release date
1	Wizards of Waverly Place: The Movie	August 28, 2009
2	The Suite Life Movie	March 25, 2011
3	Good Luck Charlie, It's Christmas!	December 2, 2011
4	The Wizards Return: Alex vs. Alex	March 15, 2013

== Crossovers ==
#	Title	Air date	Crossover between
1	That's So Suite Life of Hannah Montana	July 28, 2006	That's So Raven, The Suite Life of Zack & Cody, and Hannah Montana
2	Take This Job and Love It	June 16, 2007	Hannah Montana and Cory in the House
3	Wizards on Deck with Hannah Montana	July 17, 2009	Wizards of Waverly Place, The Suite Life on Deck, and Hannah Montana
4	Weasels on Deck	October 11, 2010	I'm in the Band and The Suite Life on Deck
5	Charlie Shakes It Up	June 5, 2011	Good Luck Charlie and Shake It Up
6	Austin & Jessie & Ally All Star New Year	December 7, 2012	Austin & Ally and Jessie
7	Good Luck Jessie: NYC Christmas	November 29, 2013	Good Luck Charlie and Jessie
8	Jessie's Aloha Holidays with Parker and Joey	November 28, 2014	Jessie and Liv and Maddie
9	Karate Kid-tastrophe	March 27, 2015	Jessie and The Suite Life on Deck
10	Lab Rats vs. Mighty Med	July 22, 2015	Lab Rats and Mighty Med
11	The Ghostest with the Mostest	October 2, 2015	Jessie and I Didn't Do It
12	Girl Meets World of Terror 2	October 2, 2015	Girl Meets World and Austin & Ally
13	Bite Club	October 2, 2015	I Didn't Do It and Austin & Ally
14	All Howl's Eve	October 4, 2015	K.C. Undercover and Jessie
15	Cyd and Shelby's Haunted Escape	October 4, 2015	Best Friends Whenever and Girl Meets World
16	Scary Spirits & Spooky Stories	October 4, 2015	Austin & Ally and K.C. Undercover
17	Haunt-a-Rooney	October 4, 2015	Liv and Maddie and Best Friends Whenever
18	Raven About Bunk'd	July 24, 2020	Raven's Home and Bunk'd

Notes:

- Both "That's So Suite Life of Hannah Montana" and "Wizards on Deck with Hannah Montana" are counted as three separate episodes (the former being the That's So Raven episode "Checkin' Out", The Suite Life of Zack & Cody episode, "That's So Suite Life of Hannah Montana", and the Hannah Montana episode "On the Road Again", while the latter being the Wizards of Waverly Place episode "Cast-Away (To Another Show)", The Suite Life on Deck episode "Double-Crossed", and the Hannah Montana episode "Super(stitious) Girl").
- "Take This Job and Love It" is officially counted as a Hannah Montana episode.
- "Weasels on Deck" is counted as an I'm in the Band episode.
- "Charlie Shakes It Up" is counted as a Good Luck Charlie episode.
- "Austin & Jessie & Ally All Star New Year", "Lab Rats vs. Mighty Med", "Raven About Bunk'd", and "Good Luck Jessie: NYC Christmas" are counted as an episode for both series, due to them being a separate event.
- Part 1 of "Austin & Jessie & Ally All Star New Year" is produced as an Austin & Ally episode while part 2 was produced as a Jessie episode.
- Part 1 of "Lab Rats vs. Mighty Med" was produced as a Lab Rats episode while part 2 was produced as a Mighty Med episode.
- Part 1 of "Good Luck Jessie: NYC Christmas" was produced as a Good Luck Charlie episode while part 2 was produced as a Jessie episode.
- "Jessie's Aloha Holidays with Parker and Joey" is officially counted as a Jessie one-hour episode with Liv and Maddie characters.
- Part 1 of "Raven About Bunk'd" was produced as a Raven's Home episode while part 2 was produced as a Bunk'd episode.
- All the crossovers released on October 2 and 4, 2015 are connected to each other, taking place on the same stage, at a Halloween night party in Central Park.
