= Crimson Demon =

Crimson Demon may refer to:

- Sanada Yukimura (1567–1615), Japanese samurai nicknamed the "Crimson Demon of War"
- The Blood Demon, a 1967 West German horror film, advertised in Rhode Island newspapers as Crimson Demon
- Crimson Demon, a fictional character in the video game BloodRayne: Betrayal
- Crimson Demons, fictional characters in the light novel series KonoSuba
- Crimson Demon, a fictional character in the television series Mighty Med
- Crimson Demons, fictional characters in the video game The Seven Deadly Sins: Grand Cross

== See also ==
- Crimson King, a fictional character in the novel series The Dark Tower
- Cyttorak, a Marvel Comics character
