= Jake Short =

American actor (born 1997)

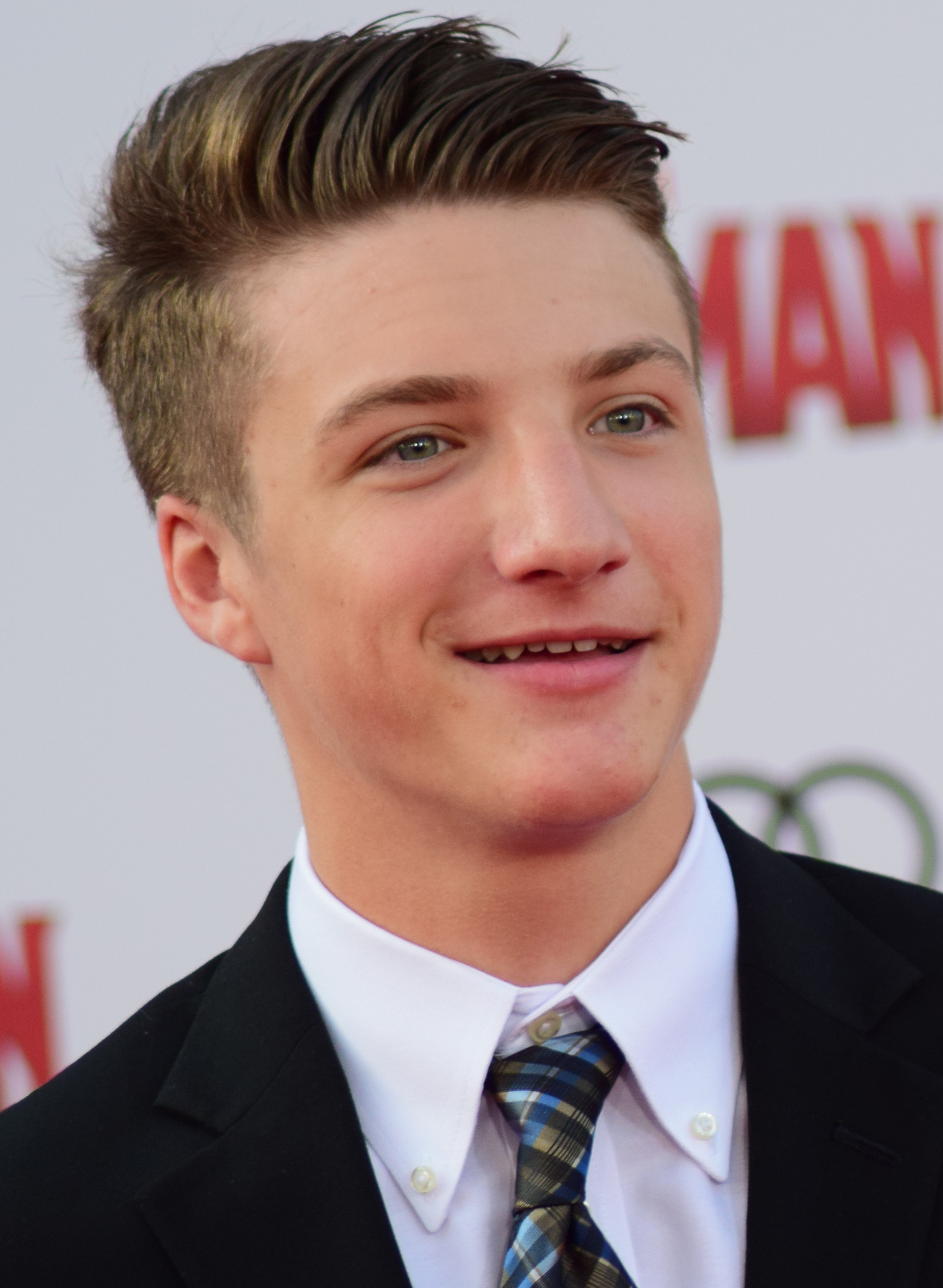
- Short in 2015
- Born: Jacob Patrick Short; May 30, 1997 (age 29); Indianapolis, Indiana, U.S.
- Occupation: Actor
- Years active: 2007–present

Jacob Patrick Short (born May 30, 1997) is an American actor. His roles have included Fletcher Quimby in the Disney Channel sitcom A.N.T. Farm (2011–2014), Oliver in the Disney XD series Mighty Med (2013–2015) and Lab Rats: Elite Force (2016), and Mattie Sullivan on the British sitcom The First Team (2020).

== Early life ==
Short was born Jacob Patrick Short on May 30, 1997, in Indianapolis, Indiana, to Kimberly (née Hankins) and James K. Short (1964–2004). He has one brother and two sisters. Short's father died when he was 6 years old.

== Career ==
His first major role was Fletcher Quimby in Disney Channel's comedy series A.N.T. Farm. He also starred as Nose Noseworthy in the 2009 film Shorts, and has acted in numerous commercials.

In 2013, Short began co-starring as Oliver on the Disney XD original series Mighty Med and its spinoff Lab Rats: Elite Force.

In 2020, Short starred as Mattie Sullivan in the British soccer-based sitcom The First Team.

On November 16, 2022, Short started a podcast called Hit the Brake (later The Sit and Chat) with Bradley Steven Perry. In 2025, the podcast went on an indefinite hiatus before all videos were removed from their YouTube channel for undisclosed reasons, although episodes were still able to be listened to on Apple Podcasts.

== Personal life ==
In 2025, Short got engaged to his longtime girlfriend, actress Mika Abdalla. The two met on the set of the Hulu comedy Sex Appeal. In June 2026, it was announced the pair had called off their engagement but remained friends. After the announcement, a 2024 podcast clip resurfaced in which Short referred to Abdalla as "some bitch", prompting criticism online. Short subsequently apologized, describing the remark as a "disrespectful, juvenile joke".

== Filmography ==
=== Film ===
Year	Title	Role	Notes
2007	The Anna Nicole Smith Story	Child Daniel	Film debut
2009	Shorts	Nose Noseworthy	
2011	It Is Dark in Here	Adam	Short film
2012	A Son Like You	Eli	Short film
2013	Unraveled	—	Co-director/producer/script supervisor
2018	#Roxy	Cyrus Nollen	
2019	Confessional	Sai	
2020	This Is the Year	Mikey	
2021	Supercool	Neil	
2022	Sex Appeal	Larson	

=== Television ===
Year	Title	Role	Notes
2009	Zeke and Luther	Kenny Coffey	Episode: "Bros Go Pro"
2009	Dexter	Scott Smith	Episodes: "Lost Boys", "Hello, Dexter Morgan", "The Getaway"
2009	Jack and Janet Save the Planet	Mookie	Pilot
2010	Futurestates	Tyler	Episode: "The Other Side"
2011	$#*! My Dad Says	Timmy	Episode: "Goodson Goes Deep"
2011–2014	A.N.T. Farm	Fletcher Quimby	Main role
2013–2015	Mighty Med	Oliver	Main role
2014	Win, Lose or Draw	Himself	Game show; panelist, 3 episodes
2014	Just Kidding	Jake	Episode: "Just a Catchphrase"
2015	Lab Rats	Oliver	Episode: "Lab Rats vs. Mighty Med: Part 1"
2016	Lab Rats: Elite Force	Oliver	Main role
2018	All Night	Fig	Main role
2020	The First Team	Mattie Sullivan	Main role
2023	Lessons in Chemistry	Ralph Bailey	Guest role
2025	High Potential	Phineas Dougherty	Episode: "Content Warning"
2026	9-1-1	Flynn	Episode: "D.I.Y."

=== Music videos ===
Year	Title	Artist(s)	Role
2011	"Dynamite"	China Anne McClain	Judge

== Awards and nominations ==
Year	Award	Category	Work	Result	Ref.
2009	Young Artist Awards	Young Artist Award for Best Performance in a Young Ensemble Cast	Shorts	Won	
2012	Kids' Choice Awards	Favorite TV Actor	A.N.T. Farm	Won	
2014	Kids' Choice Awards	Favorite TV Actor	A.N.T. Farm	Nominated	
