= Lab Rats: Elite Force =

American television sitcom

- Genre: Sitcom; Science fiction; Superhero
- Created by: Chris Peterson & Bryan Moore
- Based on: Characters created by Andy Schwartz & Jim Bernstein
- Starring: William Brent; Bradley Steven Perry; Jake Short; Paris Berelc; Kelli Berglund
- Theme music composer: Niclas Molinder; Joacim Persson; Johan Alkenäs
- Composer: Bert Selen
- Country of origin: United States
- Original language: English
- No. of seasons: 1
- No. of episodes: 15

Production
- Executive producers: Chris Peterson & Bryan Moore
- Producer: Ken Blankstein
- Cinematography: Scott Winig
- Camera setup: Multi-camera
- Running time: 21–23 minutes
- Production companies: Britelite Productions; It's a Laugh Productions

Original release
- Network: Disney XD
- Release: March 2 – October 22, 2016

Related
- Lab Rats (2012–16); Mighty Med (2013–15)

Lab Rats: Elite Force is an American comedy television series created by Chris Peterson and Bryan Moore that aired on Disney XD from March 2 to October 22, 2016. The series is a combined spinoff of Lab Rats and Mighty Med and stars William Brent, Bradley Steven Perry, Jake Short, Paris Berelc, and Kelli Berglund.

== Premise ==
Davenport has come up with a plan to form an elite team of bionic heroes and superheroes to fight a common threat from their headquarters in Centium City. He puts his plan into action after villains have destroyed Mighty Med Hospital.

== Cast and characters ==
=== Main ===
- William Brent as Chase, the intellectual bionic brother of Bree and the Elite Force’s mission leader until the events of Follow The Leader. (Note: William Brent and Bradley Steven Perry are given equal billing as lead actors in the series.)
- Bradley Steven Perry as Kaz, Oliver’s immature best friend who doesn’t always think things through but takes saving others seriously.
- Jake Short as Oliver, Kaz's best friend. Oliver works on controlling the superpowers that he, like Kaz, received in the finale of Mighty Med. He has a crush on his other best friend, Skylar.
- Paris Berelc as Skylar, the alien superhero from the planet Caldera, who is trying to get her powers restored, and Bree’s new ‘sister figure’.
- Kelli Berglund as Bree, the sister of Chase, who is also bionic and Skylar’s new best friend. Later in the series, Bree gains superpowers from the Arcturion space rock and is currently learning how to adjust both them and her bionics combined.

=== Notable guest stars ===
- Hal Sparks as Davenport
- Booboo Stewart as Roman
- Ryan Potter as Riker
- Jeremy Kent Jackson as Douglas
- Johnathan McClain as Tony
- Maile Flanagan as Perry
- Brandon Salgado-Telis as Bob
- Angel Parker as Tasha

== Production ==
Lab Rats: Elite Force was created by Chris Peterson and Bryan Moore, the duo who created Lab Rats. It is produced by Britelite Productions and It's a Laugh Productions for Disney XD. On September 3, 2015, it was announced that Lab Rats and Mighty Med would have a joint spinoff series called Lab Rats: Elite Force. Only William Brent, formerly credited as Billy Unger, and Kelli Berglund from Lab Rats and Bradley Steven Perry, Jake Short, and Paris Berelc from Mighty Med were announced as returning for the new spinoff series. Production on the series began in October 2015. It was subsequently announced that Lab Rats: Elite Force would premiere on Disney XD broadcast services on March 2, 2016, and will be available for earlier viewing on the channel's video-on-demand services on February 29, 2016.

In October 2016, actress Kelli Berglund reported on Twitter that there would not be a second season of Lab Rats: Elite Force.

== Broadcast ==
The series premiered in Canada on Disney XD on March 2, 2016, and on Disney Channel on March 6, 2016.

On October 13, 2016, series co-creator Bryan Moore posted on Twitter that there would be a Lab Rats marathon followed by the finale of Lab Rats: Elite Force, "The Attack", which aired on October 22, 2016.

== Reception ==
Emily Ashby of Common Sense Media gave the series four out of five stars.

== Episodes ==
No.	Title	Directed by	Written by	Original release date	Prod. code	U.S. viewers (millions)
1	"The Rise of Five"	Guy Distad	Chris Peterson & Bryan Moore	March 2, 2016	101	0.52
Following the events of the Lab Rats series finale, Davenport brings Chase and Bree to their new residence at the penthouse in Davenport Tower, a skyscraper in Centium City that includes a mission command center in the basement. Davenport also introduces them to their new teammates, Kaz, Oliver, and Skylar, who together form the Elite Force. Kaz immediately wants to find the people who recently destroyed Mighty Med, while the others want to come up with a plan first. A message is delivered to the penthouse, declaring that all superheroes will be destroyed, followed by Kaz, Oliver, Skylar, and anyone who protects them. Kaz runs off to find the culprits and meets them in an alley, but he is surprised to find out that they are shapeshifters Roman and Riker, the sons of a former superhero named Rodissius, whose superpowers Kaz and Oliver had earlier taken away in order to save his life. Believing that life without superpowers is worse than death, Roman and Riker want to eliminate Kaz and Oliver to get revenge. A confrontation between them and the Elite Force ensues, but the Elite Force is eventually knocked out and Roman and Riker take Skylar away. The team later locates Skylar, Roman, and Riker, and Oliver uses his cryo blast to freeze the cloud that Roman and Riker form; however, as the Elite Force celebrates with a team selfie, Roman and Riker escape. Special guest star: Hal Sparks as Davenport Guest stars: Booboo Stewart as Roman, Ryan Potter as Riker
2	"Holding Out for a Hero"	Guy Distad	Mark Brazill	March 9, 2016	102	0.64
Kaz discovers a new superpower which enables him to shoot fire out of his mouth; he impresses Davenport and Chase with his new ability during superhero training, while Oliver feels intimidated as he is still struggling with controlling his new superpowers. Later, Oliver discovers a new superpower that he calls cyclone fingers, but when he shows Davenport his new superpower on the penthouse terrace, things go awry and he accidentally sends Davenport flying over the railing. Rather than plummeting to the ground below, Davenport is able to hang off a giant bust of his head on the side of the skyscraper. Oliver goes to save him, while Chase and Kaz watch him with no backup plan. Still not in complete control of his ability to fly, Oliver crash lands and also hangs from Davenport's bust, but he gains confidence and eventually saves Davenport. Meanwhile, when Bree says Skylar is like a sister to her, Skylar begins rough-housing with Bree. Skylar explains that on her planet, all girls roughhouse with their siblings as a way of having fun and showing love to them. Later, Skylar agrees to limit her rough play with Bree, and the two form a bond. Special guest star: Hal Sparks as Davenport
3	"Power Play"	Guy Distad	Andy Schwartz	March 16, 2016	103	0.58
Oliver has always had a major crush on Skylar, and now that he has superpowers, she does not like it because she has lost her superpowers. Chase decides to come up with a solution to give Skylar her superpowers back, but he must inject coal into her body, her one weakness. Oliver gets jealous because he wants to be the one to give Skylar her superpowers back, so Chase decides to let him take the credit despite being reluctant to it. After injecting the cure, Skylar starts to become weak and ill from the coal, coughing up vapor that can kill everyone in the building. However, Skylar pulls through and gets her superpowers back and learns that the illness was just a side effect. Meanwhile, Kaz goes behind Bree's back and agrees to babysit a pet pig for Mrs. Ramsey, their neighbor. The pig later outsmarts Kaz and Bree, locking them out on the balcony, and they realize that Mrs. Ramsey is a thief after she enters the penthouse to steal their belongings. Skylar stops Mrs. Ramsey with her newly restored superpowers. Guest star: Patrika Darbo as Mrs. Ramsey
4	"The Superhero Code"	Victor Gonzalez	Julia Miranda	March 23, 2016	106	0.44
When Kaz's younger brother Kyle visits, Kaz becomes jealous that Kyle seems to like Chase more than him, and Kaz cannot reveal his identity as a superhero due to the superhero code. Chase's controlling attitude gets on Kaz's nerves and he and Kyle explore the unauthorized areas of the mission command center. However, Kyle ends up trapped inside an electrified cage after messing with the mainframe computer. Chase attempts to get Kyle out but is knocked out by a shock from the cage. Kaz uses his firepower to break the cage gate open, which initially frightens Kyle. When Kyle thinks that Kaz is now bionic, Kaz and the others go along with the belief to avoid breaking the superhero code. After Kyle leaves, Oliver and Skylar agree they will pass themselves off as bionic in public so that they can use their superpowers freely. Meanwhile, Oliver is still having difficulty controlling his superpowers. When Bree's tablet computer is found broken, she blames Oliver. Skylar eventually accepts responsibility, revealing that she accidentally broke several of Bree's belongings because she has not yet mastered her regained powers. Guest star: Tristan DeVan as Kyle
5	"Need for Speed"	Victor Gonzalez	Greg Schaffer	March 30, 2016	104	0.50
Davenport returns to Mission Creek to be with Tasha as she approaches the end of her pregnancy. He sends Douglas to stay at the penthouse and create the new mission suits for the Elite Force, but Chase has already begun designing his own version of the suit. Following disagreements, Chase and Kaz team up against Douglas and Oliver to see who can create the better mission suit. The two teams add various features to their suit designs in an attempt to outdo each other, but the suits prove to be impractical when Kaz and Oliver test them out. Chase and Douglas then agree to work together on creating an acceptable suit. Meanwhile, in the park, Bree uses her super speed to film a commercial for her new line of shoes. Bree tries running backward, but she falls and nearly hits a baby in a stroller. After Skylar uses her super speed to rescue the baby, the commercial director is impressed and decides to have her star in the commercial instead. Skylar accepts the role but later declines so Bree can have it. However, when they get into an argument about who is faster, they decide to have a high-speed race through the park to determine who will get the role. Both are disqualified for the role after it is learned that they cheated against each other in the race. Guest stars: Jeremy Kent Jackson as Douglas, Johnathan McClain as Tony
6	"Follow the Leader"	Guy Distad	Ken Blankstein	April 6, 2016	105	0.58
Chase discovers that Perry is living in the mission command center as a vacation spot, and he becomes trapped with her when she accidentally shoots out the controls of the elevator, thinking he was an intruder. Chase is trapped during the team's first mission, so Skylar steps in as mission leader; however, this makes Chase jealous when the other team members want her to be their fulltime leader. On the next mission, when Skylar is downstairs with Perry, Chase disables the elevator to trap her. Led by Chase, the team responds to a collapsed tunnel to rescue people. Perry leads Skylar out of the mission command center and to the mission site through the tunnels that Perry initially used to break in. Skylar, Perry and Chase become trapped when part of the tunnel collapses. After Perry reveals that Chase disabled the elevator, he admits it and says that he feared losing the respect of the entire team. After Kaz rescues the three, Skylar is asked by the other team members why she missed the mission and she tells them that the elevator malfunctioned again. She subsequently tells Chase that she felt the same way he did when she lost her superpowers. Later, Perry uses this opportunity to blackmail Chase into getting her a penthouse next to theirs. Guest star: Maile Flanagan as Perry
7	"The List"	Victor Gonzalez	Kenny Byerly	April 13, 2016	107	0.62
With help from Kaz, Chase is able to compile a list of all the superheroes from Mighty Med so they can be warned of the threat from Roman and Riker. Among the superheroes is Crossbow, Skylar's mentor and first friend, who is living undercover as a groundskeeper for a park in Centium City. Worried that Crossbow did not receive the message, Skylar sets out with Oliver to find her, despite Chase's warning that tracking her down could endanger her life. Skylar and Oliver find Crossbow in the park and warn her about Roman and Riker, who had been eavesdropping on Skylar and Oliver earlier. Riker shows up at mission command in disguise as Kaz so he can retrieve the list of superheroes, but Chase and Bree realize who he is and freeze him. Roman shows up in the park and attacks Skylar, Oliver and Crossbow. Bree and Chase arrive as Roman is about to leave with Crossbow. A swap is made between the two sides: Crossbow in exchange for Riker and the superhero list. However, Roman kills Crossbow after she destroys the list. Skylar becomes upset and attacks Roman and Riker, forcing them to retreat. Later, Kaz and Oliver are able to revive Crossbow. Guest stars: Booboo Stewart as Roman, Ryan Potter as Riker, Eric Steinberg as Rodissius, Pepi Sonuga as Crossbow
8	"Coming Through in the Clutch"	Hal Sparks	Jason Dorris	July 25, 2016	109	0.44
When Oliver's weightlifting hero Clutch is in town, he gets excited and wants to meet him at the Olympics Sendoff Celebration in the park. At the event, Oliver is upset when Kaz is chosen to be Clutch's spotter as he lifts 1,000 pounds. Clutch soon struggles, and when Oliver attempts to help, he accidentally drops the weight on Clutch's foot and breaks it. Later, Oliver feels sorry for hurting his hero, so Skylar uses her super speed to abduct Clutch and bring him to the penthouse to have Oliver heal his injury. Oliver is initially unsure of himself in healing a non-superhero, but after a pep talk from Skylar, he realizes a way to instantly heal Clutch's foot by using one of his powers. Meanwhile, at the park, Chase and Bree attend a mini-Olympics competition for children, where they run into Bob. Chase is upset that he cannot compete in the real Olympics because of his bionics, which would offer him an unfair advantage. Instead, he decides to coach Bob in the mini-Olympics, which do not have strict rules about the use of bionics. Bree decides to coach a girl named Zoe to compete against Bob. Guest stars: Brandon Salgado-Telis as Bob, Justin Lopez as Clutch, Sanai Victoria as Zoe
9	"The Intruder"	Jody Margolin Hahn	Ken Blankstein	September 10, 2016	112	0.41
The Elite Force decides to hold a boys versus girls competition to see which team can go longer without using bionics or superpowers, but Chase is immediately disqualified after he uses his bionic intellect to calculate his team's odds of winning. AJ, a ten-year-old computer genius boy who lives in the same building as the Elite Force, manages to break into the mission command center. Chase improves the security system by installing retina scanners, but AJ manages to get back in after hacking Chase's bionic chip and having him disable the security system. However, Chase's magnetism app glitches because of the hacking, causing metal objects to cling onto Chase. AJ devises a solution by having Chase get into his capsule, which resets his operating system and restores him to normal. Because AJ is lonely, Chase agrees to let him occasionally visit the team. Meanwhile, the team's competition has come down to Kaz and Skylar, with the girls ultimately prevailing over the boys. Guest stars: Jeremy Kent Jackson as Douglas, Elisha Henig as AJ
10	"The Rock"	Hal Sparks	Mark Brazill	September 17, 2016	114	0.46
The team is annoyed by the persistent presence of AJ, and is then surprised when he reveals his awareness that Kaz, Oliver, and Skylar are all superheroes. AJ then compiles a ranked list of the team members based on their powers and usefulness, causing hurt feelings with Bree and Chase. Chase attempts to prove that he doesn’t deserve to be last on the list by making a hover bike with AJ that that competes with Bree's super speed. Meanwhile, Oliver learns that Kaz is a hoarder and has been unknowingly keeping the Arcturion in storage among many other items. Bree is also upset about her low ranking, but tries not to show her anger and jealously after Skylar boasts about her powers and having a higher ranking than Bree. But when Bree learns about the Arcturion that gave Oliver and Kaz their powers, she plans to take drastic measures to boost her own powers at the expense of putting her life at risk. Guest star: Elisha Henig as AJ
11	"Home Sweet Home"	Victor Gonzalez	Greg Schaffer and Andy Schwartz	September 24, 2016	110–111	0.54
When Skylar's friend Scarlett from Caldera visits, she tries convincing Skylar to come back to Caldera. When Skylar declines, Scarlett kidnaps her and imprisons her on Caldera. Scarlett reveals that Caldera is having a civil war with the old government, who wants to help others, and the opposition, who wants to help themselves. Scarlett is part of the opposition. Bree and Oliver find out about Skylar and head to Caldera to rescue her, but Scarlett imprisons them with Skylar. Scarlett threatens to keep Oliver and Bree locked up unless Skylar joins her. Skylar agrees and is stripped of her ability to travel to Earth. Later, Bree is able to send an email to Chase and Kaz for help. Meanwhile, Chase creates a robotic girlfriend named Christina, but she falls in love with Kaz. Chase creates six additional girlfriends, but they all fall in love with Kaz as well. When Chase and Kaz get Bree's message, they head for Caldera. Scarlett releases Oliver and Bree, but imprisons them and Skylar again when Oliver tries to escape with Skylar. Scarlett plans to kill them by lowering their metal cage into a lava pit. Chase and Kaz arrive and help the others escape. Scarlett attempts to kill the group, but falls to her death trying to do so. Later, Skylar is depressed over Caldera's civil war, but Bree tells her that Earth is her home. Guest stars: Angeline Appel as Christina, Alexxis Lemire as Scarlett Double, Melissa Christine as Skylar Double Note: This is a double-length special episode.
12	"Sheep-Shifting"	Bradley Steven Perry	Maxwell Theodore Vivian	October 1, 2016	115	0.41
Chase attempts to learn more about Roman and Riker's shapeshifting abilities by developing a potion. While Chase is not around, Kaz drinks the potion to test it out on himself and gains shapeshifting abilities. While demonstrating his abilities to Oliver and Skylar, Kaz turns himself into a sheep, but is unable to revert to his human appearance. Chase discovers that Kaz drank the potion and explains that when he became a sheep, he also took on its mental capacity, preventing him from knowing how to change back. The effects of the potion eventually wear off and Kaz returns to his former self. Meanwhile, Perry reveals to Bree that she starred on a television series when she was a child and that a cast or crew member has died on every Halloween since the series ended. As Perry is the last surviving member, she fears for her life, so she has Bree protect her. Guest star: Maile Flanagan as Perry
13	"Game of Drones"	Guy Distad	Mark Brazill	October 8, 2016	108	0.34
Oliver becomes jealous when Kaz begins spending time with Chase to build a drone for a drone race. Chase agrees to implement Kaz's unusual ideas into the drone design, but reveals to Oliver that he plans to remove the designs before the competition to increase the chances of winning. After Oliver tells Kaz about Chase's plans, he and Kaz decide to take one of Davenport's drones and enter it in the competition against Chase. At the competition, Chase tells Kaz and Oliver that the drone they activated is an attack drone designed to destroy any threat it senses. Chase also reveals that he had chosen to leave Kaz's design ideas intact. Meanwhile, Perry reveals that she comes from a family of circus people and that the women in her family were skilled tightrope walkers. Perry, feeling the need to achieve an accomplishment of her own, decides to tightrope walk between two skyscrapers, which makes Bree nervous for Perry's safety. Later, Perry unfortunately slips from the tightrope after the attack drone flies past her, though she manages to grab onto the rope before falling. The attack drone targets Perry, who destroys it with her umbrella. Guest star: Maile Flanagan as Perry
14	"They Grow Up So Fast"	Paul Hoen	Julia Miranda	October 15, 2016	113	0.27
Chase becomes obsessed with developing an age-reversal device after Kaz uses a mobile phone app to show him a picture of what he will look like when he is older. Meanwhile, Tasha brings her baby daughter Naomi to visit the Elite Force. Naomi cries whenever she is held by Bree, who becomes jealous when she sees that Naomi likes being held by Skylar. Tasha says she has had little free time since Naomi was born and asks the team if they will watch the baby for a while. Despite that she is not well-liked by Naomi, Bree insists on taking care of the baby to show Tasha that she can be trusted. While Bree is distracted by cleaning baby food off of her shirt, Naomi wanders away and finds the mission command center, where she uses Chase's anti-aging device; however, the device is not finished and instead ages Naomi to a 16-year-old. Tasha returns and meets the older Naomi, who Skylar and Bree say is actually a friend of theirs. When Chase is unable to turn Naomi back into a baby, Bree realizes she must confess to Tasha. As Bree is about to tell Tasha, Chase realizes how to turn Naomi back and successfully does so without Tasha finding out what happened. Guest stars: Angel Parker as Tasha, Camille Hyde as Naomi
15	"The Attack"	William Brent	Chris Peterson & Bryan Moore	October 22, 2016	116	0.55
The Elite Force is surprised to see that Chase now has a girlfriend named Reese, who he just met at a library. They later learn that Roman and Riker are using their shapeshifting abilities to terrorize the city. Later, power goes out all over the city, and the Elite Force goes out to stop Roman and Riker. Reese is left at the penthouse with Douglas, and Perry comes to be with Douglas as she is afraid of the chaos outside. Douglas leaves to activate the skyscraper's emergency generator, while Perry insists on her and Reese giving each other makeovers. The Elite Force arrives on the city streets to battle Roman and Riker, but they realize that they are actually up against a lot of shapeshifters. Rodissius arrives and reveals that the shapeshifters are his children, who are avenging him and the loss of his powers by attacking the city. Rodissius reveals that Reese is one of his children and that his plan is for her to obtain the superhero list from the mission command center while it is unprotected. After learning that Reese was just using Chase, Bree becomes upset and uses a new superhero ability to attack Rodissius. While Reese is obtaining the superhero list at the mission command center, Douglas comes in, where he is attacked by her. Reese escapes with the superhero list and then rescues her father. Perry and the Elite Force find Douglas badly injured and discover that communications have been blocked, preventing them from warning the superheroes of Rodissius' plan, so Chase declares war against Rodissius and his children. Guest stars: Maile Flanagan as Perry, Jeremy Kent Jackson as Douglas, Eric Steinberg as Rodissius, Fivel Stewart as Reese

== Ratings ==
Viewership and ratings per season of Lab Rats: Elite Force
Season	Episodes	First aired		Last aired		Avg. viewers (millions)
Season	Episodes	Date	Viewers (millions)	Date	Viewers (millions)	Avg. viewers (millions)
1	15	March 2, 2016	0.52	October 22, 2016	0.55	0.49
