= Zach Sage Fox =

American entertainer

- Born: 1993 or 1994 (age 32–33)
- Education: University of Pennsylvania
- Occupations: Internet personality and CEO of Fat Camp Films

Instagram information
- Page: @zach.sage
- Followers: 260,000

TikTok information
- Page: @zach.sage
- Followers: 1.1 million
- Last updated: 8 May 2026
- Website: fatcampfilms.com

Zach Sage Fox (Zachary Sage) is an American comedian, actor, producer and content creator known for his content in support of Israel.

== Early life and education ==
Fox grew up in Berwyn, a suburb of Philadelphia, Pennsylvania. Fox's father Fred Fox is the CEO of Planalytics, the weather analytics company Fred founded with his father Richard J. Fox. Zach Fox attended a Jewish day school and Conestoga High School. At age 12, Fox attended weight loss camp, where he became close friends with Omri Dorani. Fox attended UCLA. He was a member of the AEPi fraternity at the University of Pennsylvania, graduating in 2017.

== Career ==
As teens, Fox and Dorani founded Fat Camp Films. Fox created comedy videos on YouTube interviewing people on the street, which attracted interest from Disney XD. In 2012, when he was 18, Disney ordered a pilot for a comedy show about Fox's high school years. He also began hosting their prank-themed television show, Just Kidding. Pranks included convincing people that his tongue had frozen to an ice cream cart and that children had been eaten by a couch.

In 2015, Fox worked as a "comedian, videographer, good-looking person in tights” for No Labels, a political group that seeks to promote bipartisanship in US politics. As part of the gig, he created YouTube videos, including one where he eats fried cheese curd and asks Iowa State Fair attendees about their preferred political candidates. In 2017, Fox and Dorani wrote and directed How to Get Girls, a teen comedy starring Fox, Chris Elliott, David Koechner, and Chris Kattan. It was acquired by Hulu in 2018.

Fox's LinkedIn account describes Fat Camp Films as "the production arm" for Fuckjerry and LADbible, two social media content aggregators. According to the Fat Camp Films website, they have collaborated with the Lincoln Project and Rock the Vote. The website also states that Fox worked on social media for Michael Bloomberg's campaign during the 2020 Democratic Party presidential primaries.

In March 2025, he ran to be a delegate to the 39th World Zionist Congress as part of a right-wing, Orthodox slate affiliated with Aish HaTorah. In October 2025, Fox announced that he was working on social media for Andrew Cuomo's campaign against Zohran Mamdani in the 2025 New York City mayoral election.

=== Pro-Israel content creation ===
Since the October 7 attacks, Fox has used his social media accounts to support Israel during the Gaza war and raise awareness about antisemitism. He directs Facts for Peace, a pro-Israel social media campaign.

In 2024, Fox posted a video of himself dressed as Moses asking New York University students if they believed Hamas should release the Israeli hostages. In a video called "Wild West Bank", he travels to Ramallah, Palestine, and speaks to local residents. According to Fox, everyone he spoke to was pro-Hamas and anti-semitic; additionally, he stated that he had to delete his footage after he was threatened by a group of Palestinian men. In another video, he attempted to recruit college students for a fake pro-Hamas fraternity; he said that about half of the students he approached agreed and that "Antisemitism on college campuses is rampant". That year, he began writing columns for The Jerusalem Post. Fox supported efforts to ban TikTok in the United States.

In February 2025, Fox posted a video called "Gaza Graduation Part 2" in which he interviewed Jewish college students about their experiences with antisemitism. In September 2025, Fox and other pro-Israel influencers attended a meeting hosted by Benjamin Netanyahu in New York City. At the meeting, Netanyahu referred to social media as a "weapon" to boost US opinion of Israel.

In 2026, ynet recognized Fox on a list of "40 Future Young Voices", calling him "one of the most prominent pro-Israel voices online".

== Filmography ==
Year	Type	Media	Credit	Ref
2012	TV show	Just Kidding	Presenter	
2017	Film	How to Get Girls	Writer, director, lead role	
