= Paris Berelc =

American actress and model

- Born: December 29, 1998 (age 27); Milwaukee, Wisconsin, U.S.
- Occupations: Actress; model
- Years active: 2008–present

External image
- Berelc at an event for Stranger Things in 2017

Paris Berelc (born December 29, 1998) is an American actress and model. She is known for her roles as Skylar Storm in the Disney XD series Mighty Med and Lab Rats: Elite Force, and Alexa Mendoza in the Netflix sitcom Alexa & Katie.

== Life and career ==
Berelc was born in Milwaukee, Wisconsin, and is of Filipino descent on her mother's side. Her mother is from Cavite, while her grandmother is Ilonggo. She was discovered by Ford Models at the age of nine, and was featured in ads for Kohl's, Boston Store, Sears, and K-mart. She appeared on the cover of American Girl magazine for their November/December Issue in 2009. In 2010, at the age of 12, Berelc took her first acting classes at the Acting Studio Chicago. Two years later, Berelc's parents decided to take her to Los Angeles to try acting professionally. She began her professional acting career in 2013, at the age of 14.

Beginning in 2013, Berelc starred as Skylar Storm on the Disney XD action sitcom Mighty Med. In 2015, Berelc portrayed Molly in the Disney Channel Original Movie, Invisible Sister, which premiered in October. The same year, Mighty Med ended its run, but Berelc continued to play Skylar Storm on its spinoff series Lab Rats: Elite Force, which premiered on March 2, 2016.

In April 2017, Berelc was cast in the co-lead role of Alexa in Alexa & Katie, a multi-camera Netflix sitcom, which premiered March 23, 2018. In 2019, she starred in the Netflix original film Tall Girl as Liz. In 2020, she appeared as Megan McNally in the Netflix original film Hubie Halloween.

== Filmography ==
Film roles
Year	Show	Role	Notes
2018	Deadly Scholars	Brittany Gomez	a.k.a. #SquadGoals
2019	Confessional	June	
2019	Tall Girl	Liz	
2020	Hubie Halloween	Megan McNally	
2022	1Up	Vivian	
2022	Do Revenge	Meghan Perez	
2025	For Worse	Aspen	
2026	Kissing Is the Easy Part	Flora	

Television roles
Year	Show	Role	Notes
2013–2015	Mighty Med	Skylar Storm	Main role
2014	Just Kidding	Herself	2 episodes
2015	Invisible Sister	Molly	Disney Channel Original Movie
2016	Lab Rats: Elite Force	Skylar Storm	Main role
2016	WTH: Welcome to Howler	Sofia	Web series; recurring role, 6 episodes
2018–2020	Alexa & Katie	Alexa Mendoza	Lead role
2018	The Thundermans	Phoebe Actor	Episode: "The Thundredth"
2019	Sugar Rush	Herself	Guest judge; episode: "Science of Sweets"
2020	Group Chat with Jayden & Brent	Herself	Episode: "Halloween – Sliming For Apples"
2021	The Crew	Jessie De La Cruz	Recurring role, 5 episodes
2021	Robot Chicken	Black Widow / Monopoly Daughter	Voice role; episode: "May Cause Light Cannibalism"
