= Roscoe Vanover =

American judge

Paris Roscoe Vanover
- Born: September 7, 1863; Wise County, Virginia, United States
- Died: September 18, 1927 (aged 64); Pikeville, Kentucky, United States
- Occupations: attorney, judge
- Spouse: Martha Potter

Paris Roscoe Vanover Sr. (September 7, 1863–September 18, 1927) was a United States circuit court judge for Pike and Letcher counties in Kentucky.

== Early life, career and family ==
Roscoe (he did not use his given first name of Paris) Vanover Sr. was born in the Cumberland Mountain district of Wise County, Virginia. He was the son of John and Keziah (Landreth) Vanover. His father was a deputy county clerk and Justice of the Peace in Pike County, Kentucky. His mother was a relative of the Confederate President Jefferson Davis. Roscoe was the youngest of ten children.

Roscoe attended a small pine-log school house as a young boy. When he was eighteen, he began teaching school in the rural districts of Pike County, where he remained for fourteen years. His interest in the law began at this time, when he started writing legal papers for his father and neighbors. He was a self-taught student and was admitted to the bar in 1895. He taught Sunday school and served as an elder for twenty-five years in the Christian Church of Pikeville. He was married to Martha Potter in 1885. They had thirteen children. His wife Martha Jane Potter is mentioned in Kerr's History of Kentucky (under Judge Roscoe Vanover's article) and given the honor of knitting more wool sock for the soldiers during World War I than any other female in the United States.

Before being elected to District Court Judge, Vanover served as Deputy Sheriff of Pike County, Kentucky and was a practicing attorney-at-law. As a lawyer he was regarded as one of the leading members of the Pike County bar and his impartiality and thorough knowledge and application of the law made his position a permanent one in the judicial history of Kentucky. During his legal career, he conducted as many cases than any other attorney in eastern Kentucky. As a Trustee, he helped to establish Christian Normal Institute (now known as Kentucky Christian University) in Grayson, Kentucky. A tribute page was given to him in their 1927–28 yearbook, the Graysonian, at the time of his death. He helped students financially, who wanted to pursue a legal education and also helped students attend the Christian Normal Institute who could not afford to do so. In 1919, he was elected Judge of the Circuit Court of Pike and Letcher counties of Kentucky.

== Circuit Court Judge for Pike and Letcher County, Kentucky ==
As a judge, he established an enviable record for his fight against the illegal whisky interests. He destroyed over 150 illegal moonshine stills. His slogan when he was running for office was "Destroy the Stills and Save the BOYS". Judge Vanover's fight against illegal moonshine was so successful he managed to jail a wealthy local contractor, and even the county's deputy sheriff and the deputy sheriff's two teenage sons, for whisky violations. Instead of making and running moonshine, Judge Vanover told the guilty they should join up and fight in World War I. His impartiality was unlimited; he sent two of his own sons to jail for being mixed up in a whisky selling scheme. Of the twenty-six murder cases tried in Pike and Letcher county, Kentucky in 1921, twenty-five were directly caused by whisky according to Judge Vanover, "Stamp out whisky and you put down murder and other forms of lawlessness". His goal was to stamp out bootlegging in the two counties.

In 1920, his Letcher County grand juries had returned more than 400 true bills against whiskey traffickers. He served as circuit court judge for only two years, 1919 through 1921, but in these two years he was able to accomplish more in ridding Pike and Letcher Counties of their illegal moonshine business than any other judge. He had a good record as a trial judge and the record of his services, as revealed by the decisions of the Court of Appeals, shows that reversals of his rulings were rare. As Judge of Pike and Letcher Counties, one of his first duties, for the first time in history, was to open each session of court with prayer for the court and the juries. He himself would lead the court in prayer.

At the time of his death, in September 1927, he was the eldest member of the bar in active practice. A street in downtown Pikeville was named in his honor. He remained a law student all his life, as he was constantly reading law books. He only stopped studying the law two weeks prior to his death, because he was too ill to continue. His knowledge of the law was so great that he memorized all the Statutes and Code of Practice and could describe from memory the indexes and tables of contents. Any particular section he wished to find was fixed in his memory.
