= Billy Unger =

American actor (born 1995)

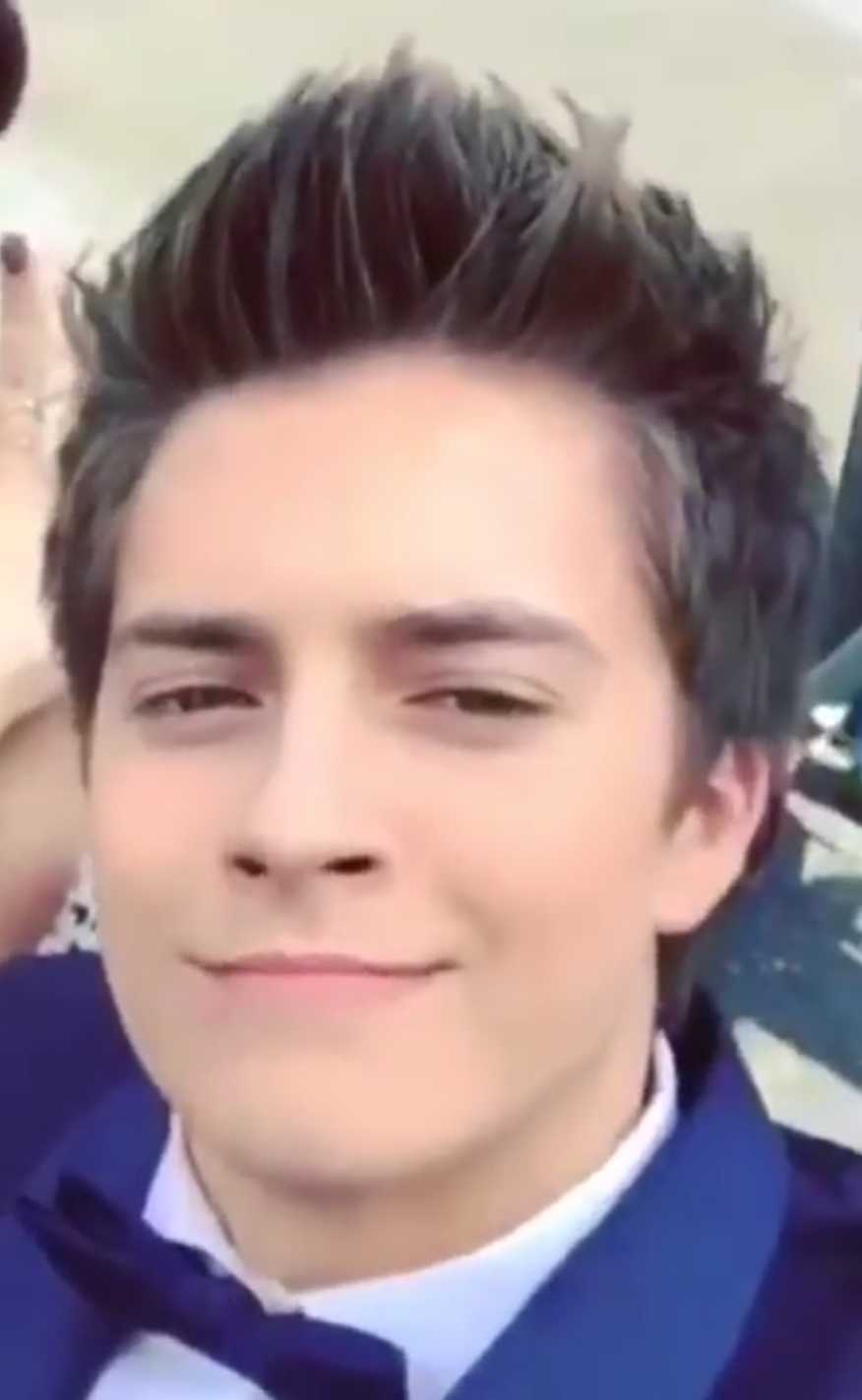
- Unger in 2015
- Born: William Brent Unger; October 15, 1995 (age 31); Palm Beach County, Florida, U.S.
- Other name: William Brent
- Occupation: Actor
- Years active: 2007–2016
- Known for: Lab Rats (2012–2016); Lab Rats: Elite Force (2016)
- Spouse: Angela Moreno (m. 2015)
- Children: 2

William Brent Unger (born October 15, 1995) is an American former actor. He is known for playing Chase on the Disney XD series Lab Rats and Lab Rats: Elite Force. Credited as Billy Unger before 2016, starting with Lab Rats: Elite Force, he is credited as William Brent.

== Early and personal life ==
Unger was born William Brent Unger on October 15, 1995, in Palm Beach County, Florida to William and Karley (née Pence) Unger. He moved to Hollywood with his family in 2006. In 2015, Unger married his wife Angela Moreno. They have two sons together.

== Career ==
Since moving to LA, Unger has guest starred on Disney XD's Kickin' It, Disney Channel's Sonny with a Chance and A.N.T. Farm, and on No Ordinary Family, Ghost Whisperer, Hawthorne, Terminator: The Sarah Connor Chronicles, Mental, Medium, Desperate Housewives, Cold Case, and Scrubs. He also made an appearance on The Tonight Show with Jay Leno.

Unger has appeared in the films National Treasure: Book of Secrets, You Again, Monster Mutt, Opposite Day, Jack and the Beanstalk, and Rock Slyde.

Beginning in 2012 he began starring as Chase, the youngest of the super-human bionic teens, in the Disney XD series Lab Rats. In 2016, he continued to play Chase on the Lab Rats spinoff series Lab Rats: Elite Force, now credited as William Brent. After Lab Rats: Elite Force's cancellation, Brent retired from acting to focus on his family and music career.

== Filmography ==
=== Film ===
Year	Title	Role	Notes
2007	Seven's Eleven: Sweet Toys	Frankie	
2007	National Treasure: Book of Secrets	Charles Gates	
2008	Rock Slyde	Young Rock Slyde	
2008	Cop Dog	Robby North	
2008	Opposite Day	Samuel "Sammy" Benson	
2009	Crank: High Voltage	Young Chev Chelios	
2010	Jack and the Beanstalk	Prince Charming	
2010	Monster Mutt	Zack Taylor	
2010	A Turtle's Tale: Sammy's Adventures	Hatchling Sammy	Voice role
2010	You Again	Ben Olsen	
2013	The Lost Medallion: The Adventures of Billy Stone	Billy Stone	

=== Television ===
Year	Title	Role	Notes
2007	Scrubs	Devin	Episode: "My Turf War"
2007	Cold Case	Jeff Reed	Episode: "Stalker"
2007	Desperate Housewives	Chad	Episode: "Gossip"
2007	Desperate Housewives	Jeremy McMullin	Episode: "Something's Coming"
2008	Medium	Young Joey / Teddy Carmichael	Episode: "Being Joey Carmichael"
2008	Can You Teach My Alligator Manners?	Eric	Voice role; episodes: "Birthday Manners", "Good Sport Gator"
2008	Terminator: The Sarah Connor Chronicles	Martin "Marty" Bedell	Episode: "Goodbye to All That"
2008	Family Guy	various roles	Voice role; episode: "Tales of a Third Grade Nothing"
2009	Special Agent Oso	Michael	Voice role; episode: "The Boy with the Golden Gift"
2009	Mental	Conor Stephens	Episode: "Manic at the Disco"
2009	Hawthorne	Sam	Episode: "Yielding"
2010	Ghost Whisperer	Pete Murphy	Episode: "The Children's Parade"
2010	Sonny with a Chance	Wesley	Episode: "Sonny With a 100% Chance of Meddling"
2011	No Ordinary Family	Troy Cotten	Episode: "No Ordinary Friends"
2012–2016	Lab Rats	Chase Davenport	Main role
2012	Kickin' It	Brody	Episode: "The Wrath of Swan"
2012	A.N.T. Farm	Neville	Episode: "endurANTs"
2016	Lab Rats: Elite Force	Chase	Main role; credited as William Brent; final role

=== Video game ===
- Uncharted 3: Drake's Deception (2011), as Young Nathan Drake (voice role; also motion capture)

== Awards and nominations ==
Year	Award	Category	Role	Result	Refs
2009	Young Artist Award	Best Performance in a DVD Film	Cop Dog	Won	
2009	Young Artist Award	Best Performance in a TV Series – Guest Starring Young Actor	Medium	Nominated	
2010	Young Artist Award	Guest Starring Young Actor 13 and Under	Mental	Won	
2011	Young Artist Award	Best Performance Feature Film – Supporting Young Actor	You Again	Won	
2011	Young Artist Award	Best Performance in a TV Series – Guest Starring Young Actor 14–17	Ghost Whisperer	Nominated	
2012	Young Artist Award	Best Performance in a DVD Film – Young Ensemble Cast	Monster Mutt	Nominated	
