= Mighty Med =

- Genre: Comedy; Superhero
- Created by: Jim Bernstein; Andy Schwartz
- Starring: Bradley Steven Perry; Jake Short; Paris Berelc; Devan Leos; Augie Isaac
- Theme music composer: Todd P. Andrew; Douglas Starling Jones; Christian Salyer
- Opening theme: "You Never Know" performed by Brandon Mychal Smith & Adam Hicks
- Ending theme: "You Never Know" (instrumental)
- Composer: Jamie Dunlap
- Country of origin: United States
- Original language: English
- No. of seasons: 2
- No. of episodes: 44 (list of episodes)

Production
- Executive producers: Jim Bernstein; Stephen Engel
- Producer: Kevin O'Donnell
- Camera setup: Multi-camera
- Running time: 22 minutes
- Production company: It's a Laugh Productions

Original release
- Network: Disney XD
- Release: October 7, 2013 – September 9, 2015

Related
- Lab Rats: Elite Force

Mighty Med is an American science fiction comedy television series created by Jim Bernstein and Andy Schwartz and produced by It's a Laugh Productions for Disney XD. It stars Bradley Steven Perry, Jake Short, Paris Berelc, Devan Leos, and Augie Isaac. The series aired for two seasons, premiering on October 7, 2013, and running through September 9, 2015.

== Premise ==
While at a comic book store called The Domain, which is located in Philadelphia, Pennsylvania, two boys named Kaz and Oliver find themselves in a superhero hospital called Mighty Med upon finding its secret entrance at the local hospital. They become doctors and youth observers at Mighty Med under the supervision of Horace Diaz, despite the fact that they are "normos" (a term given to ordinary humans). Kaz and Oliver work on various injured superheroes while having some misadventures along the way that would involve encounters with various supervillains.

== Episodes ==
Season	Episodes	Originally released	
Season	Episodes	First released	Last released
1	24	October 7, 2013	September 15, 2014
2	20	October 20, 2014	September 9, 2015

== Cast ==
- Bradley Steven Perry as Kaz
- Jake Short as Oliver
- Paris Berelc as Skylar Storm
- Carlos Lacámara as Horace Diaz
- Devan Leos as Alan Diaz
- Augie Isaac as Gus (recurring season 1, starring season 2)

== Production ==
The series was greenlit in April 2013. It premiered with a one-hour episode on October 7, 2013 and aired on Disney Channel on October 12, 2013.

On May 22, 2014, Disney renewed the series for a second season with production to resume in July. The second season started on October 20, 2014, and completed its run on September 9, 2015.

== Broadcast ==
The series originally premiered on October 7, 2013, on Disney XD and on October 12, 2013, on Disney Channel. It premiered on Disney XD (Canada) on November 2, 2013, on February 17, 2014, on Disney XD (Malaysia), and on February 27, 2014, on Disney XD (UK & Ireland). It premiered on March 7, 2014, on Disney Channel (Southeast Asia), and also on Disney XD (Europe, Middle East and Africa). It premiered on April 11, 2014, on Disney XD (Australia).

== Spinoff series ==
On September 3, 2015, it was announced that Mighty Med would end after its second season and would be followed by a spinoff series called Lab Rats: Elite Force that will also include two characters from Lab Rats. Jake Short, Bradley Steven Perry, and Paris Berelc were the only cast members that were announced as returning for the spinoff series. It was subsequently announced that Lab Rats: Elite Force would premiere on Disney XD on March 2, 2016.
