= Jilon VanOver =

American actor (born 1978)

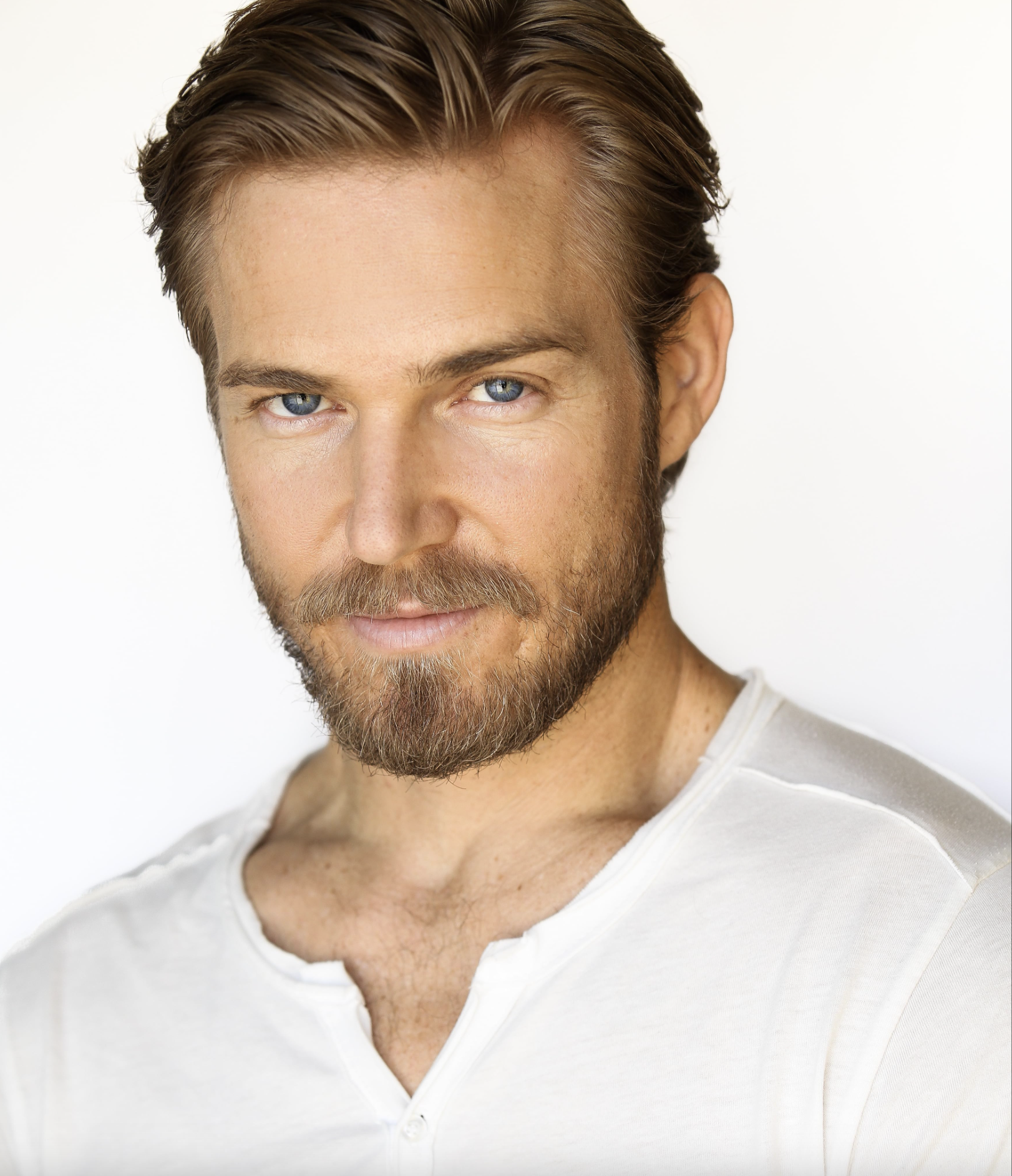
- Born: Jilon Ghai VanOver; August 24, 1978 (age 48); Loma Linda, California, United States
- Occupation: Actor
- Years active: 2002-present
- Spouse: Kylie King (m. 2012)

Jilon Ghai VanOver (/‘ʒɪloʊn ‘gaɪ ‘vænoʊvər/; born August 24, 1978) is an American actor. He is best known for his portrayal of "Ransom Bray" in the History Channel’s Emmy Award winning miniseries, Hatfields & McCoys, as well as "Tecton" in the Disney XD Original Series, Mighty Med.

== Early life ==
VanOver was born in Loma Linda, California. His father, James Otto “Jim” VanOver, is a Muay Thai trainer and university professor, and his mother, Geni Elizabeth King, is an auditory-sensory integration therapist. He was raised in the high desert of Baldy Mesa, California, with his older sister, Guebri, and three younger brothers, Gaven, Jamiel, and Jerid.

He has a black belt in Shorin-Ryu and he has been known to perform with various local Los Angeles bands, playing a number of instruments including the saxophone, clarinet, and harmonica.

VanOver attended Serrano High School in Phelan, California, before receiving a football scholarship to attend Murray State University in Murray, Kentucky. In 2001, he graduated with a degree in Theatre Arts and returned to California to pursue an acting career.

== Career ==
He has had several guest starring roles in popular television series including Better Call Saul, Cold Case, Chicago P.D., NCIS: Los Angeles, Psych, Lab Rats, and Mighty Med. On July 22, 2015, VanOver made a special appearance in a series crossover episode of Lab Rats as the Mighty Med superhero, "Tecton."

In 2013, VanOver portrayed “Lucas Holst,” an Amish farmer in the Lifetime movie, An Amish Murder, opposite Neve Campbell and directed by Stephen Gyllenhaal. He also co-starred as super agent “Ray Harris” in the television movie Strawberry Summer and as movie star “Bobby Savage” in the digital series Chasing the Hill.

In a voice-over role, VanOver lent his voice to the post-apocalyptic creatures of the film I Am Legend starring Will Smith, which was released in 2007.
