= Just Kidding (TV series) =

Canadian hidden camera reality television series

- Genre: Comedy
- Created by: Pierre Girard; Jacques Chevalier
- Based on: Just for Laughs
- Presented by: Zach Fox; Jason Earles; Tyrel Jackson Williams; Calum Worthy
- Country of origin: Canada
- Original language: Silent
- No. of seasons: 4
- No. of episodes: 65

Production
- Production location: Canada
- Running time: 22 minutes

Original release
- Network: Teletoon; Trans TV
- Release: February 3, 2013 – April 1, 2015

Just Kidding is a Canadian hidden camera reality television series that first aired on February 3, 2013 on its Canadian channel, Teletoon, and November 19, 2012 on Disney XD. It is not broadcast on Télétoon due to TVA's broadcasting rights of the series in French-Canadian territories. However, on September 1, 2015, the series moved over to La Chaîne Disney. The series has also been broadcast in the UK (CBBC), France, Australia, Southeast Asia, Poland, Brazil, Spain, Norway, Turkey, and Sweden. Unlike the international versions, the Disney XD version is hosted by YouTube sensation Zach Fox, and the Disney XD stars Jason Earles and Tyrel Jackson Williams, and since 2014, is hosted by the Disney Channel star Calum Worthy. In 2014, Just Kidding (along with other live-action Teletoon shows, My Babysitter's a Vampire and R.L. Stine's The Haunting Hour) moved from Teletoon to YTV. The series was cancelled on November 30, 2014.

The show is loosely based on Just for Laughs Gags (which is itself based on the American show Candid Camera), with some inspiration from René Cardona's La risa en vacaciones series to boot, only this show's premise focuses on kids pulling jokes. The series plays with no written dialogue, apart from the main theme which gives the impression that all the kids share the hosting position.

== Episodes ==
=== Series overview ===
Season	Episodes	Originally released	
Season	Episodes	First released	Last released
1	26	November 18, 2012	February 11, 2013
2	16	November 8, 2014	April 1, 2015

=== Season 1 (2012–13) ===
No. overall	No. in season	Title	Original release date
1	1	"Picture Perfect"	November 19, 2012
Zach poses as a photographer and catches people's candid reactions when a broken seat drops them to the ground as they say "cheese." Marshmallows fall from the sky.
2	2	"Baseball Robot"	November 20, 2012
A prank involving broken science equipment. Also: an art exhibit comes to life.
3	3	"Scary Tarantula"	November 21, 2012
A prank involving a tarantula. Also: a moving piranha mural.
4	4	"Frozen Tongue"	November 22, 2012
Pranks are pulled on unsuspecting people. In the opener, host Zach Fox tricks bystanders into believing that his tongue is stuck to an ice-cream cart cooler. Also: a sofa that swallows kids; a water-squirting watermelon
5	5	"Human Door Knocker"	November 23, 2012
Zach disguises himself as part of a door knocker and surprises people as they try to deliver a package. Also: a park-bench toilet; a life size jack-in-the-box.
6	6	"Underarm Juice"	November 26, 2012
Zach squeezes fresh orange juice using his underarm. Also: a fake frozen dog; a paper-shredding mailbox.
7	7	"Golf"	November 27, 2012
8	8	"Hockey"	November 28, 2012
9	9	"Arm Wrestling"	November 29, 2012
10	10	"Foosball"	November 30, 2012
11	11	"High Five"	December 3, 2012
12	12	"Instruments"	December 4, 2012
13	13	"Football"	December 5, 2012
14	14	"Autobiography"	December 6, 2012
15	15	"Dodge Ball"	December 7, 2012
16	16	"Tyrel Vanishes"	December 10, 2012
17	17	"Extreme Sports"	December 11, 2012
18	18	"Scared"	December 12, 2012
19	19	"Dancing"	December 13, 2012
20	20	"Street Performing"	December 14, 2012
21	21	"Ghost Tyrel"	January 7, 2013
22	22	"Garageys"	January 14, 2013
23	23	"Jump Rope"	January 21, 2013
24	24	"Tyrel Leaves"	January 28, 2013
25	25	"Thumb War"	February 4, 2013
26	26	"Working Out"	February 11, 2013

=== Season 2 (2014–15) ===
No. overall	No. in season	Title	Original release date
27	1	"Just a Pop Star"	November 7, 2014
28	2	"Just a Catchphrase"	November 15, 2014
29	3	"Just an Illusion"	November 22, 2014
30	4	"Just a Pitch"	November 29, 2014
31	5	"Just a Laugh"	December 6, 2014
32	6	"Just my Assistant"	January 17, 2015
33	7	"Just a Prank on Me?"	January 24, 2015
34	8	"Just Locked In"	January 31, 2015
35	9	"Just a Competition"	February 7, 2015
36	10	"Just Resting"	February 14, 2015
37	11	"Just Behind the Scenes"	February 21, 2015
38	12	"Just Fit"	February 25, 2015
39	13	"Just a New Look"	March 7, 2015
40	14	"Just Knitting"	March 14, 2015
41	15	"Just a Sneeze"	March 25, 2015
42	16	"Just a Cookie"	April 1, 2015
