= Jim Bernstein =

American television writer

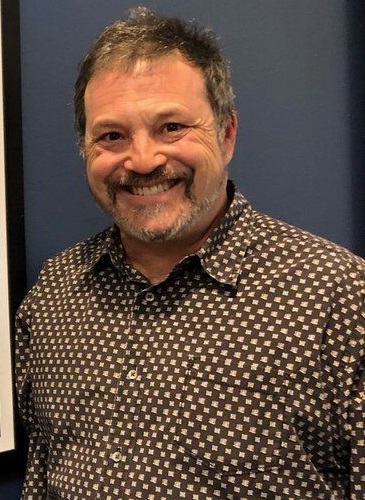
- Education: University of California, Santa Cruz; University of Southern California
- Occupations: screenwriter, producer
- Years active: 1996–present
- Known for: Family Guy; American Dad; Phineas and Ferb; Milo Murphy's Law; Mighty Med

Jim Bernstein is an American screenwriter and producer. He is co-creator and executive producer of the Disney XD series Mighty Med. He is a graduate of the USC School of Cinematic Arts and has been nominated for three Emmy awards. In 2021, he won an Emmy Award for Outstanding Writing Team for a Daytime Animated Program for Phineas and Ferb the Movie: Candace Against the Universe.

== Writer ==
- Homeboys in Outer Space TV Series (1996) (staff writer)
- Big Wolf on Campus TV Series (1999–2000) (staff writer)
- Family Guy TV Series (1999–2002) (story editor)
- The Trouble With Normal TV Series (2000) (story editor)
- Off Centre TV Series (2001) (consultant)
- Oliver Beene TV Series (2003) (supervising producer)
- Andy Richter Controls the Universe TV Series (2002–2004) (producer)
- Quintuplets (2004) TV Series (supervising producer)
- American Dad! (2005) TV Series (co-executive producer)—Emmy Nomination
- Shane (2007) TV Pilot (co-creator)
- Phineas and Ferb (2007) TV Series (writer)—Emmy Nomination
- Mighty Med (2013) TV Series (co-creator/executive producer)
- Milo Murphy's Law (2016) TV Series (writer)
- Phineas and Ferb the Movie: Candace Against the Universe (2020) Movie (co-writer)—Emmy Award Winner
- Hamster & Gretel (2020) TV Series (writer)
