= Jonas season 1 =

Jonas
- Season 1
- Season 1 poster
- Starring: Joe Jonas; Kevin Jonas; Nick Jonas; Chelsea Staub; Nicole Anderson; John Ducey
- No. of episodes: 21

Release
- Original network: Disney Channel
- Original release: May 2, 2009 – March 14, 2010

Season chronology
- Next → Season 2

The first season of the television series Jonas was aired on Disney Channel from May 2, 2009, to March 14, 2010, and included 21 episodes. It introduces the six main characters of the series and follows the Jonas Brothers as they live pop star lives and deal with ordinary teenage problems.

The season's soundtrack was never officially released. The season itself was released on DVD in two volumes: "JONAS: Rockin' The House", released on September 22, 2009, and "I Heart JONAS", released on January 26, 2010, both by Disney DVD. Three volumes making up the entire first season of JONAS were released on Region 2 DVD in the United Kingdom and Region 4 in Australia. The three new titles being: "Rockstars In the House", "Ready To Rock" and "Keeping It Real".

== Production ==
This season was set in New Jersey, before the setting changed to Los Angeles for the second season and was shot at Hollywood Center Studios, which has also been the home to several other Disney Channel sitcoms over the years including The Suite Life on Deck and Wizards of Waverly Place. This is the first original series on the channel to be broadcast in high definition since its first season.

== Opening sequence ==
The theme song for JONAS is "Live to Party", performed by the Jonas Brothers (as JONAS). The song's lyrics describe the basic premise of the television series – the Jonas' lifestyle.

The full-length version, which is 2 minutes, 55 seconds in length, was included on Disney Channel Playlist, the video game "JONAS" and a UK bonus track for the band's third album, A Little Bit Longer. For the TV version of the theme, which lasts only 50 seconds, only the first two stanzas and the last two were used.

The opening sequence shows the main cast members as the Jonas perform a song, with the creator's names appearing in the second-to-last part. The show's title logo design appears at the end of the sequence.

== Casting ==
Nicole Anderson also auditioned for the role of Stella, but actress Chelsea Staub ended up winning the part. According to Staub, her previous work with director Sean McNamara helped her land the role. After the series plot changed, producers decided to create a best friend for Stella and offered Anderson, Staub's real life best friend, the role of Macy.

JONAS was intended to star Kevin, Nick, and Joe Jonas, who lend their first names to their television counterparts. The role of Frankie Lucas was also created with Frankie Jonas in mind. In addition, Robert "Big Rob" Feggans, the Jonas Brothers real-life head of security, plays The Big Man, the JONAS bodyguard.

== Episodes ==
No. overall	No. in season	Title	Directed by	Written by	Original release date	Prod. code	US viewers (millions)
1	1	"Wrong Song"	Jerry Levine	Ivan Menchell	May 2, 2009	105	4.0
Kevin and Joe warn Nick that he's falling too fast for his crush, Penny, but Nick doesn't listen to them. Nick then becomes heartbroken when he hears Penny singing the love song, that he wrote especially for her, to her boyfriend. Meanwhile, Stella creates a new line of clothing called Stellcro and uses Macy to test it. Jonas Songs featured: "Give Love a Try" Guest Star: Bridgit Mendler as Penny
2	2	"Groovy Movies"	Paul Hoen	Ivan Menchell	May 9, 2009	102	2.2
After ruining their mom’s home videos on her birthday, the boys feel very sorry. So, they decided to reenact all the scenes. Guest Stars: Rebecca Creskoff as Sandy, Frankie Jonas as Frankie; Absent: Nicole Anderson as Macy Misa Note: The home videos shown in this episode are actual Jonas Brothers home videos.
3	3	"Pizza Girl (US)" "Slice of Life (UK)"	Paul Hoen	Heather MacGillvray & Linda Mathious	May 16, 2009	108	3.3
The guys all fall for their pizza delivery woman and they break their JONAS code by competing with each other for her affection. Jonas Songs featured: "Pizza Girl"; Guest Stars: Rebecca Creskoff as Sandy, Frankie Jonas as Frankie and Scheana Marie Jancan as Maria Notes: Kevin makes a reference to Maria from The Sound of Music.
4	4	"Keeping It Real"	Lev L. Spiro	Michael Curtis & Roger S. H. Schulman	May 17, 2009	103	3.4
The boys try to impress their mom by doing normal chores, but are unable to do so because of screaming fans. Jonas Songs featured: "Keep It Real" Guest Star: Rebecca Creskoff as Sandy, Frankie Jonas as Frankie and Kara Stribling as Little Girl
5	5	"Band's Best Friend"	Linda Mendoza	Kevin Kopelow & Heath Seifert	June 7, 2009	109	3.7
Joe's childhood friend Carl comes to visit them, but manipulates their popularity for his own gain so they teach him a lesson. Meanwhile, Stella is furious with Macy for using the money she lent her to buy a collector potato chip that has a resemblance to Joe. Jonas Songs featured: "We Got To Work It Out" Guest Star: Nate Hartley as Carl Schuster and John Lloyd Taylor as Mr. Costello
6	6	"Chasing the Dream"	Paul Hoen	Kevin Kopelow & Heath Seifert	June 14, 2009	104	2.5
When Kevin allows Macy to be a backup singer after their normal backup singer falls ill, he is put in an awkward situation when Macy turns out to be tone deaf. Meanwhile, Frankie designs a T-shirt for the JONAS merchandise, but it only features himself. Jonas Songs featured: "Keep It Real" Guest Stars: Rif Hutton as Malcolm Meckle
7	7	"Fashion Victim"	Lev L. Spiro	Michael Curtis & Roger S.H. Schulman	June 21, 2009	101	4.0
Joe gets jealous when Stella goes on a date with Van Dyke, so he calls for an emergency fashion meeting, ruining Stella's date. In turn, Stella gives Joe a bad outfit to wear when meeting the Queen of the United Kingdom. Jonas Songs featured: "Tell Me Why" Guest Stars: Frankie Jonas as Frankie, Chuck Hittinger as Van Dyke Tosh and Millicent Martin as Her Majesty
8	8	"That Ding You Do"	Paul Hoen	Heather MacGillvray & Linda Mathious	June 28, 2009	106	3.5
Joe finds that it is rough being a member of JONAS when he develops a crush on a cello player who dislikes rock stars, so he decides to play the triangle in the orchestra. Meanwhile, Macy and Stella have a bet on who can go longest minus their so called obsessions. (Macy can't say JONAS and Stella can't text.) Jonas Songs featured: "Blue Danube" (Rock version); Guest Stars: Peter MacKenzie as Mr. Phelps and Mariah Buzolin as Angelina Title Reference: That Thing You Do
9	9	"Complete Repeat"	Sean McNamara	Ivan Menchell	July 5, 2009	110	3.0
Nick experiences writer's block as part of a really bad day. When he falls asleep, he dreams of writing a great song but can't remember it once he wakes up, so Joe and Kevin try to re-create Nick's bad day to so that he will be able to dream his great song again. Jonas Songs featured: "I Did It All Again"; Guest Star: Samantha Boscarino as Amy Absent: Nicole Anderson as Macy Misa
10	10	"Love Sick"	Paul Hoen	Michael Curtis & Roger S.H. Schulman	August 2, 2009	113	3.7
Joe questions his relationship with Stella when invited to a fashion event. Meanwhile, Macy accepts a date with Randolph and decides to make him into a "Nick clone". Jonas Songs featured: "Love Sick" Guest Star: Graham Patrick Martin as Randolph
11	11	"The Three Musketeers"	Savage Steve Holland	Kim Duran & Zachary Rosenblatt	August 9, 2009	114	N/A
The members of JONAS try their hand at acting in a school production of the Three Musketeers. Joe then becomes jealous after finding out that Van Dyke Tosh, who fills in for Joe due to stage fright, is Stella's love interest. Meanwhile, Macy tries to find her lucky charm bracelet with the help of Kevin. Jonas Songs featured: "Tell Me Why" Guest Stars: Chuck Hittinger as Van Dyke Tosh and Tangelia Rouse as Mrs. Snark
12	12	"Frantic Romantic (US)" "Undercover Paparazzi (UK)"	Jerry Levine	Ivan Menchell	August 16, 2009	116	N/A
A magazine linked Joe in a relationship with a celebrity named Fiona Skye. When Fiona begins to follow Joe, he and his brothers realize that something must be done. Guest Star: Sara Paxton as Fiona Skye
13	13	"Detention"	Paul Hoen	Julie Sherman Wolfe	August 23, 2009	112	N/A
A teacher lets Joe slide on an accident with a fire alarm, but gives his friend Abby detention for the same mistake. Meanwhile, Stella struggles with her grade in P.E. class. Jonas Songs featured: "Tell Me Why" and "Keep It Real"; Guest Stars: Tangelia Rouse as Mrs. Snark, Carly Lang as Abby, and Bob Glouberman as Mr. Spencer Absent: John Ducey as Tom Lucas
14	14	"Karaoke Surprise"	Paul Hoen	Michael Curtis & Heather MacGillvray	September 6, 2009	115	N/A
For their 15th Friendship Anniversary, Joe suggests to throw a party for Stella and enlists the help of Macy, but Stella gets suspicious when she sees Joe and Macy snooping behind her back. Meanwhile Nick and Kevin bet who's better at Hackeysack and Kevin takes a kung-fu twist to the competition. Jonas Songs featured: "Give Love a Try" and "Keep It Real"
15	15	"Home Not Alone"	David Kendall	Linda Mathious & Heather MacGillvray	September 20, 2009	118	N/A
Kevin, Joe and Nick are left home alone for a week and they try to behave and impress their parents, but when Frankie throws a party, their plans go into a tailspin. Meanwhile, Stella unwittingly "takes control" of the JONAS fan club from Macy. Title Reference: Home Alone
16	16	"Forgetting Stella's Birthday"	Paul Hoen	Zachary Rosenblatt & Kim Duran	September 27, 2009	117	N/A
When Joe, Nick, and Kevin forget Stella's birthday, they try to plan her another one, but schedule it at the same time as a "big interview". Jonas Songs featured: "Time Is On Our Side" Guest Star: Jim Turner as Robert Lincoln Coler
17	17	"The Tale of the Haunted Firehouse"	Paul Hoen	Juile Sherman Wolfe	October 11, 2009	119	N/A
When Kevin thinks there is a ghost in the firehouse, he enlists Stella, Joe and Nick to help him find it. Absent: Nicole Anderson as Macy Misa Notes: This episode aired first on Disney Channel Middle East on October 3, 2009 as part of Disney Channel's "Wiz-Tober 2009".
18	18	"Double Date"	Michael Curtis	Roger S.H. Schulman & Michael Curtis	November 8, 2009	120	N/A
Van Dyke asks Stella on a date to El Meat, a new, all-meat restaurant, and a jealous Joe crashes the date with Macy, in order to keep an eye on Stella. Meanwhile, Kevin has an addiction to Nick's cookies and Nick tries to teach Kevin a lesson about self-control. Guest star: Chuck Hittinger as Van Dyke Tosh Absent: John Ducey as Tom Lucas
19	19	"Cold Shoulder"	Paul Hoen	Heather MacGillvray & Linda Mathious	December 6, 2009 (Note: This episode can also be seen on the DVD "JONAS: Rocking the House" that was released on September 22, 2009, as a bonus feature. Scandinavia is the first song from the Jonas Brothers in which Kevin Jonas sings lead vocals.)	111	N/A
Kevin's old girlfriend, Anya has joined the school, but the kids in school make fun of her because they find her eccentric. Meanwhile, Joe, Nick, Stella and Macy try to find out who has been taking picture of Jonas and uploading it on Macy's website. Jonas Songs featured: "I Left My Heart in Scandinavia" Guest Star: Madison Riley as Anya
20	20	"Beauty and the Beat"	Savage Steve Holland	Kevin Kopelow & Heath Seifert	January 24, 2010 (Note: This episode can also be seen on the DVD "JONAS: Rocking the House" that was released on September 22, 2009 as a bonus feature.)	107	N/A
The boys are the judges of a beauty contest that Stella decides to be a part of, but she ends up humiliating herself. Jonas Songs featured: "We Got To Work It Out"; Guest Stars: Mark DeCarlo as himself, Cindy Ambuehl as Maggie Belle, and Chelsea Harris as Carrie Sue; Absent: Nicole Anderson as Macy Misa; Title Reference: Beauty and the Beast Event Allusion: Miss Teen South Carolina USA 2007 Caitlin Upton answering her final question in a strange and grammarless manner at the Miss Teen USA 2007 beauty pageant.
21	21	"Exam Jam"	Paul Hoen	Ivan Menchell	March 14, 2010	121	3.6
As the JONAS World Concert Tour draws closer, Joe and Stella come to terms with being apart from one another over the summer. Meanwhile, Kevin and Joe devise a plan to help Nick ace his geometry test after their dad threatens not to send the brothers on tour unless they pass all of their school exams. Macy narrates throughout the episode. Jonas Songs featured: "Time Is On Our Side", "Love Sick", "Give Love a Try", "Scandinavia" (new version), "Work It Out", and "Keep It Real" Notes: This episode first aired on Disney Channel India on January 22. This is the first season finale, with their tour continuing from this episode. This is John Ducey's final episode as a regular cast member.
