= Jonas season 2 =

Jonas
- Season 2
- Season 2 poster
- Starring: Joe Jonas; Kevin Jonas; Nick Jonas; Chelsea Staub; Nicole Anderson
- No. of episodes: 13

Release
- Original network: Disney Channel
- Original release: June 20 – October 3, 2010

Season chronology
- ← Previous; Season 1

The second and final season of the television series Jonas, rebranded Jonas L.A. for this season, aired on Disney Channel from June 20, 2010 to October 3, 2010, and included 13 episodes. It follows the five main characters of the series as they spend their summer vacation in Los Angeles after the Jonas' tour was over, a few months after the events of the first season.

The season was never officially released on DVD, being available only in digital format. After the season finale, it was announced that the show would not be returning for another season.

== Production ==
The series was originally set in New Jersey, before the setting changed to Los Angeles for the second season and was shot at Hollywood Center Studios, which has also been the home to several other Disney Channel sitcoms over the years including The Suite Life on Deck and Wizards of Waverly Place. As of November 2010, JONAS L.A. was the only live-action Disney Channel Original Series, produced by It's a Laugh Productions, not filmed before a live studio audience.

Disney Channel officially announced in November 2010 that JONAS L.A. would not return for a third season.

== Opening sequence ==
The theme song for JONAS L.A. is "Live to Party", performed by the Jonas Brothers (as Jonas).

The opening sequence shows the main cast members as the Jonas perform a song, with the creator's names appearing in the second-to-last part. The show's title logo has been redesigned to match the series new theme.

== Cast ==
=== Main ===
- Joe Jonas as Joe Lucas
- Nick Jonas as Nick Lucas
- Kevin Jonas as Kevin Lucas
- Chelsea Staub as Stella Malone
- Nicole Anderson as Macy Misa

=== Recurring ===
- Adam Hicks as Dennis "DZ" Zimmer
- Chris Warren Jr. as Jake Williams
- Abby Pivaronas as Vanessa Paige
- Beth Crosby as Lisa Malone
- Debi Mazar as Mona Klein
- China Anne McClain as Kiara Tyshanna
- John Ducey as Tom Lucas

== Music ==
Some of the songs for this season (such as "L.A. Baby" and "Feelin' Alive") were used to promote the season two of JONAS. The soundtrack was officially released on July 20, 2010.

== Episodes ==
| No. overall | No. in season | Title | Directed by | Written by | Original release date | Prod. code | US viewers (millions) |
|---|---|---|---|---|---|---|---|
| 22 | 1 | "House Party" | Paul Hoen | Lester Lewis | June 20, 2010 | 201 | 3.3 |
When the boys arrive in Los Angeles, they are told by their new neighbor, DZ (parody of JZ), that they have to throw a party to fit in, and the boys decide to do it. Meanwhile, Stella and Macy arrive in L.A., with Stella thinking that Joe wants to continue their romantic relationship. But things go downhill when he's spotted hugging actress Vanessa Page (Abby Pivaronas). Songs: "L.A. Baby" Guest Stars: Adam Hicks as DZ, Emma Roberts as Herself and Anna Maria Perez de Taglé as Herself (uncredited)
| 23 | 2 | "Back to the Beach" | Eyal Gordin | Marc Warren | June 27, 2010 | 202 | 4.2 |
Joe prepares for an audition with Vanessa Page, but when he arrives, he is faced with a room full of actors who all resemble him. Stella and Kevin help him while doing a scene for his audition. Meanwhile, Nick gets jealous when pro surfer Stone Stevens asks Macy to work on his website. Songs: "Fall" Guest Stars: Adam Hicks as DZ, Debi Mazar as Mona Klein and Austin Butler as Stone Stevens
| 24 | 3 | "Date Expectations" | Paul Hoen | Paul Ruehl | July 2, 2010 | 203 | 3.2 |
Stella meets a new friend, Ben, while hiking with Macy and he asks her out. She accepts, causing Joe to get very jealous and confront Ben. Meanwhile, it's an all out war between Kevin and Nick to see who gets the spot in Justin Timberlake's Ping-Pong Tournament. Songs: "Make It Right"; Guest Stars: Chris Warren Jr. as Jake, Adam Hicks as DZ and Robert Adamson as Ben Note: This episode was originally slated to premiere on July 4, but it was moved up to July 2.
| 25 | 4 | "And... Action" | Paul Hoen | Ned Goldreyer | July 11, 2010 | 204 | 3.7 |
Joe arrives late to movie set, angering Mona. Stella's aunt takes up a new hobby. Meanwhile, Macy gives DZ a makeover and tips about what girls like in a guy. But the tips are actually what she likes in a guy, hinting to Nick. Songs: "Invisible"; Guest Stars: Adam Hicks as DZ, Debi Mazar as Mona Klein, Kym Whitley as Officer Evie and Claire Demorest as Andrea Munroe Note: The scenes of Joe and Vanessa on the set of Forever April were filmed on the Universal Lot on the original "Bates Motel" set from the movie Psycho. And the spa session that Macy gave DZ included: new clothes, eyebrow waxing, doing his hair (which was tough because of hair tonic and hair glue), and gives him advice on girls.
| 26 | 5 | "America's Sweethearts" | Eyal Gordin | Jessica Kaminsky | July 25, 2010 | 205 | 3.5 |
Joe asks Stella to find out if Vanessa likes him, but she is unwilling and thus fails. Stella lies to Joe that Vanessa doesn't have feelings for him, which results in both costars being hurt until Stella comes clean. Kevin becomes Mona's assistant. Songs: "Hey You"; Guest Stars: Debi Mazar as Mona Klein Absent: Nicole Anderson as Macy Misa
| 27 | 6 | "The Secret" | Paul Hoen | Grace Parra | August 1, 2010 | 206 | 4.1 |
When Big Man leaves Nick in charge of watching his niece Kiara for the day, she figures out that Nick and Macy have been keeping their relationship a secret from everyone else. In order to keep her quiet, Nick agrees to record a song with her. Meanwhile, Joe accidentally gives Kevin a black eye during his movie fight training. Songs: "Your Biggest Fan", "Keep It Real" and "Set This Party Off"; Guest Star: China Anne McClain as Kiara Tyshanna Note: According to Nicole Anderson, a kiss between her and Nick Jonas was filmed for this episode, but was deleted.
| 28 | 7 | "A Wasabi Story" | John Scott | Danny Warren | August 8, 2010 | 207 | N/A |
Vanessa arranges a double date with Stella & Ben and her & Joe to have a world-famous sushi chef for them. Things get complicated when Ben and Vanessa find out that Joe and Stella had something between each other before. Kevin and Nick are going to a golf course and Macy asks if she can come along. Songs: "Chillin' In The Summertime" Guest Star: Alec Mapa as Chef Shiraki, Chris Warren Jr. as Jake and Robert Adamson as Ben
| 29 | 8 | "Up in the Air" | John Scott | Marc Warren | August 15, 2010 | 208 | N/A |
Mona asks Joe if Stella wants to be the new designer on set, much to Vanessa's annoyance. Meanwhile, Kevin tells Nick that Macy only likes handmade gifts, so he makes a mug for her for their "1 month-iversary". Songs: "Things Will Never Be The Same"; Guest Stars: Debi Mazar as Mona Klein and China McClain as Kiara Tyshanna Note: This episode premiered on Joe Jonas' 21st birthday.
| 30 | 9 | "Direct to Video" | Paul Hoen | Ned Goldreyer & Paul Ruehl | August 22, 2010 | 209 | 3.8 |
The brothers decide to make a new music video which Kevin wants to direct, but is upset after his father hires a popular music video director, McP, to direct the video instead. Meanwhile, Frankie has a crush on Macy and is trying to win her heart away from Nick. Also, Stella gets sick and Aunt Lisa takes care of her. Songs: "Drive" Guest Stars: John Ducey as Tom Lucas, Frankie Jonas as Frankie Lucas and Antony Del Rio as McP
| 31 | 10 | "The Flirt Locker" | Paul Hoen | Jennifer Fisher | August 29, 2010 | 210 | 3.4 |
A well-known celebrity blogger named Jessika nicknamed "The Movie Brat" interviews Joe for his movie, so Joe decides to flirt with her to prove to Stella that his charm is universal. Nick meets with a music producer. Also, Big Man makes Kevin do a vigorous workout to get back into shape. Songs: "Critical"; Guest Star: Abbie Cobb as Jessika Note: This episode premiered on Nicole Anderson's 20th birthday.
| 32 | 11 | "Boat Trip" | Savage Steve Holland | Lester Lewis | September 12, 2010 | 211 | 2.8 |
With Joe and Stella not speaking to each other, Nick and Macy come up with a plan to get them to talk. Meanwhile, David Henrie challenges Kevin to a reality show competition. Songs: "Chillin in the Summer Time"; Special Guest Star: David Henrie as Himself Special appearance by: Emily Osment as Herself
| 33 | 12 | "On the Radio" | Savage Steve Holland | Jessica Kaminsky | September 26, 2010 | 212 | 2.8 |
Joe, Nick and Kevin do an interview on the radio to assure their fans that they are not breaking up. During the interview, they find out each of them have been doing a side project. Songs: "Summer Rain"; Special Guest Star: David Henrie as Himself Guest Star: Debi Mazar as Mona Klein, Chris Warren Jr. as Jake and Abby Pirvonas as Vanessa Paige
| 34 | 13 | "Band of Brothers" | Ryan Shiraki | Ryan Shiraki | October 3, 2010 | 213 | 3.5 |
In the series finale, The Jonas Brothers plan a secret concert to show their fans that they are not breaking up. Meanwhile, Stella feels betrayed when Joe doesn't tell her that he has to go to New Zealand to shoot his sequel movie "Forever April", so she leaves L.A. But right before she gets on the airplane, Joe runs into the airport and kisses her. They end up getting back together and they all have to get to the concert, where Nick and Macy have been waiting for them the whole time. Songs: "Feelin Alive" "Critical" and "L.A. Baby (Acoustic Version)" Guest Stars: China Anne McClain as Kiara Tyshanna, Frankie Jonas as Frankie Lucas, Abby Pirivonas as Vanessa Paige, Chris Warren Jr. as Jake and Debi Mazar as Mona Klein
