= List of The Soul Man episodes =

The Soul Man is an American comedy series created by Suzanne Martin and Cedric the Entertainer. A spin-off of Hot in Cleveland, the series stars Cedric the Entertainer as Reverend Boyce "The Voice" Ballantine, a former R&B singer who relocates to St. Louis to become a minister. The Soul Man also stars Niecy Nash as Lolli, Boyce's wife, Jazz Raycole as their daughter Lyric, Wesley Jonathan as Boyce's younger brother "Stamps", and John Beasley as Barton, the father of Boyce and Stamps.

Twelve episodes of the series were ordered for the first season, and the pilot was made available online for a limited time on June 13, 2012. The series officially premiered on June 20, 2012. On December 13, 2012, TV Land officially picked up The Soul Man for a second season of 10 episodes. The second season premiered on June 19, 2013.

The Soul Man was renewed for a third season that consisted of eight episodes and premiered on March 26, 2014 with a special live episode. A fourth season of twelve episodes began airing on March 18, 2015 with a live episode.

As of June 22, 2016, 54 episodes of The Soul Man have aired, concluding the fifth season and the series.

== Series overview ==
Season	Episodes	Originally released	
Season	Episodes	First released	Last released
1	12	June 20, 2012	September 5, 2012
2	10	June 19, 2013	August 28, 2013
3	8	March 26, 2014	May 14, 2014
4	12	March 18, 2015	May 27, 2015
5	12	March 30, 2016	June 22, 2016

== Episodes ==
=== Season 1 (2012) ===
No. overall	No. in season	Title	Directed by	Written by	Original release date	Prod. code	US viewers (millions)
1	1	"Lost in the Move"	Stan Lathan	Suzanne Martin & Cedric the Entertainer	June 20, 2012	101	1.92
Only being in the ministry for a few weeks, Reverend Boyce Ballantine deals with the ups and downs of his church and family life. Boyce helps his wife Lolli get more customers for her salon. Meanwhile, Boyce's daughter Lyric wants to have her sweet sixteen filmed for a television reality program.
2	2	"Pastor Interference"	Stan Lathan	Devon Shepard	June 27, 2012	102	1.20
Barton interferes with the way Boyce practices his ministry. Lyric wants her own car, so Boyce and Lolli make her practice driving by running errands with Stamps tagging along.
3	3	"The Ballentine Hands"	Stan Lathan	Robert Peacock	July 4, 2012	105	0.81
Choir director Lester (Gary Anthony Williams) convinces Boyce to hire outside singers (Tamar Braxton and Trina Braxton) to win an annual choir competition. Lolli hires Stamps as the salon shampoo boy, but his womanizing ways nearly sabotage Lolli's business.
4	4	"I Wanna Spend Time Witchoo"	Stan Lathan	Teri Schaffer & Raynelle Swilling	July 11, 2012	108	0.88
It's Boyce's birthday and his quiet plans with Lolli are interrupted when Paul and Robin (Cedric Yarbrough and Yvette Nicole Brown), his bickering neighbors from Las Vegas, pay a visit. Meanwhile, at the church, Stamps, Lyric and Barton plan a surprise party for Boyce.
5	5	"My Old Flame"	Stan Lathan	Phoef Sutton	July 18, 2012	103	0.85
Boyce is visited by his first high school girlfriend (Tamala Jones) who is having marital problems, and it is clear that she wants more than spiritual guidance. Meanwhile, after attending a funeral, Barton decides to reveal his will to his sons while still alive, but Boyce is not entirely pleased with the will's contents.
6	6	"Preacher's Block"	Stan Lathan	Raynelle Swilling & Teri Schaffer	July 25, 2012	104	1.12
Boyce is suddenly at a loss for words when preparing a sermon, so Lolli asks his old songwriting partner, Sweet Brown Taylor (Anthony Anderson), to help. Meanwhile, Barton and Stamps get trapped after installing an alarm system in Boyce's office.
7	7	"The God-Fathers"	Stan Lathan	Joe Furey	August 1, 2012	106	0.95
Lolli's tea party for the female parishioners gets a little crazy after Boyce's cousin Nikki (Sherri Shepherd) spikes the punch. Meanwhile, a powerful clerical organization could determine the future of Boyce's church.
8	8	"J.C. Carpenter's Gospel Show"	Stan Lathan	Norm Gunzenhauser	August 8, 2012	107	1.03
Boyce's former backup singer, Willie (Cee Lo Green), now touring as mega-preacher J.C. Carpenter with a huge following, decides to back out of the spotlight and wants Boyce to break the news to his congregation. Meanwhile, Barton turns to Lolli for romantic advice.
9	9	"How to Be a Church Lady"	Stan Lathan	Todd Jones & Earl Richey Jones	August 15, 2012	109	1.03
Lolli is caught gossiping about a church member's wife, Carolyn (Cynthia Stevenson), and the news gets back to Boyce. Meanwhile, Barton does not approve of Stamps' new girlfriend Renee (Reagan Gomez), but changes his tune after realizing she cooks a fantastic breakfast.
10	10	"Loving Las Vegas"	Stan Lathan	Joe Furey	August 22, 2012	110	0.97
The family travels back to Las Vegas for a restful vacation, but things turn stressful when Barton faces the temptations of Sin City and they meet the casino manager Henry (Tim Reid). Elsewhere, Lolli takes a decidedly non-"churchy" side trip with Pearlie and Wanda, and Stamps steals a round of golf with Michael Jordan that was intended for Boyce.
11	11	"To Leave or Not to Leave"	Stan Lathan	Robert Peacock	August 29, 2012	111	1.01
After visiting his brother in Florida, Barton starts making plans to move there. Meanwhile, the Ballentines brace for the perfect storm, as both bad weather and Barton's ex-wife, Della (Loretta Devine), are headed for St. Louis.
12	12	"Momma's Home"	Stan Lathan	Phoeff Sutton	September 5, 2012	112	0.99
Continuing from the previous episode, a blackout caused by the storm coincides with the arrival of Barton's ex-wife in St. Louis. Boyce attempts to counsel his father and mother.

=== Season 2 (2013) ===
No. overall	No. in season	Title	Directed by	Written by	Original release date	Prod. code	US viewers (millions)
13	1	"Get Thee Behind Me"	Shelley Jensen	Michael Curtis & Roger S. H. Schulman	June 19, 2013	202	N/A
Boyce has to undergo a physical exam to fulfill the church's insurance policy. When Dr. Owens (Kim Wayans) tells Boyce the exam reveals that he needs a colonoscopy, he considers skipping the procedure until Barton sets him straight. Meanwhile, Lolli's sister Kim (Kellee Stewart) is in town and needs a place to stay while she searches for an apartment.
14	2	"My Brother's Keeper"	Shelley Jensen	Story by : Yvette Lee Bowser; Teleplay by : Devon Shepard	June 26, 2013	201	N/A
While Lolli is despondent after taking Lyric to a remote boarding school, Boyce reminds her that they now have the house to themselves. Their alone time is short-lived, however, as Barton kicks out Stamps and kicks him "in" to Boyce's and Lolli's home.
15	3	"Daddy and Mommy Dearest"	Leonard R. Garner, Jr.	Teri Schaffer & Raynelle Swilling	July 10, 2013	204	N/A
Paul and Robin, Boyce and Lolli's bickering old neighbors from Las Vegas, are back. This time they have a teenage Foster child in tow, and announce that they're planning to move to St. Louis permanently.
16	4	"Love Thy Neighbor"	Phill Lewis	David M. Matthews	July 17, 2013	203	N/A
Lolli notices that Kevin and Danielle (Jamie Kennedy and Arden Myrin), the neighbors across the street, throw numerous parties without inviting them. Boyce invites them to a party at the Ballentine house, but soon discovers that few people feel comfortable partying with a minister. He amps it up by singing some of his old songs, kicking the party into high gear, only to discover that Kevin and Danielle are into a different kind of "party". Meanwhile, Stamps begins to show feelings for Lolli's sister Kim.
17	5	"The Punching Preacher"	Phill Lewis	Devon Shepard	July 24, 2013	206	N/A
Boyce decks a man who was constantly hitting on Lolli, and the incident is caught on video. Stamps mixes the video with music, uploads it to YouTube, and the "Punching Preacher" goes viral. Boyce is enjoying the hero worship, until a young man in his flock (Maestro Harrell) emulates the video and punches out a friend.
18	6	"Bride and Prejudice"	Leonard R. Garner, Jr.	Carla Banks Waddles	July 31, 2013	208	0.90
Boyce has reservations when a lesbian couple (Paula Jai Parker and Toni Trucks) wants to get married in his church, until he sees similarities in their relationship to the one he shares with Lolli.
19	7	"Save the Last Dance for Me"	Shelley Jensen	Phoef Sutton	August 7, 2013	207	0.90
Barton is trying to get over a second breakup with his ex, Della, so Boyce tries to convince his father to attend a "steppin'" dance night at Bird's with a waitress who likes him.
20	8	"Boyce in the Hood"	Shelley Jensen	Carla Banks Waddles	August 14, 2013	205	N/A
Boyce tries to get jobs for three ex-cons in his second-chance program. Meanwhile, Stamps has an idea for an "old school" dessert bakery and asks Boyce to finance it, while Kim learns that Stamps likes her.
21	9	"Music and Lyric"	Leonard R. Garner, Jr.	Michael Curtis & Roger S. H. Schulman	August 21, 2013	209	N/A
A video of Lyric rapping a raunchier version of "I Wanna Have Sex Witchoo" surfaces, which has Lolli, Boyce and Boyce's flock concerned. When Boyce and Lolli's parental advice falls on deaf ears, they try to talk some sense into Lyric by becoming her managers. Meanwhile, the relationship between Stamps and Kim is heating up, but they decide to keep it a secret for now.
22	10	"Revelations"	Leonard R. Garner, Jr.	Gayle Abrams & Pat Bullard	August 28, 2013	210	0.89
Boyce is back in the studio to record a song, with his old songwriting partner Sweet Brown Taylor now producing. At the same time, the TV show 30 Minutes is doing a retrospective on Boyce's career change and family life. Things get interesting after Boyce starts acting (in Lolli's words) "like a diva," while Kim gets annoyed when Stamps allows the 30 Minutes host (Elise Neal) to flirt with him.

=== Season 3 (2014) ===
No. overall	No. in season	Title	Directed by	Written by	Original release date	Prod. code	US viewers (millions)
23	1	"All the Way Live"	Stan Lathan	Devon Shepard	March 26, 2014	301	1.02
In a special live episode, Boyce is excited about doing his first concert in years to raise money for a children's charity. But his excitement wanes when he finds the church elders want to prohibit him from doing his "suggestive" top hits, the band bus breaks down in Iowa, and the venue for the show is double-booked for a bar mitzvah. Meanwhile, Lolli convinces Boyce to pressure Stamps into getting his own place, but the move backfires when Stamps makes plans to move in with Kim.
24	2	"Obama Drama"	Stan Lathan	Michael Curtis & Roger S. H. Schulman	April 2, 2014	302	TBA
Boyce and Lolli are preparing to attend a fundraising dinner where President Barack Obama and First Lady Michelle Obama will be present, when Lyric brings home her new boyfriend (David Alan Grier), a record producer at least Boyce's age. Boyce pulls the man aside and hints that he should just end things now before Lyric starts looking for a commitment, but the man instead proposes to Lyric at the dinner, causing Boyce to react angrily and get thrown out. Meanwhile, Stamps has prepared a "healthy" cupcake he plans to give to the First Lady, in the hopes that she'll give it her endorsement.
25	3	"Brother, Can You Spare a Kidney?"	Stan Lathan	David M. Matthews	April 9, 2014	303	TBA
Paul and Robin are back, and this time Paul asks Boyce if he'd give up a kidney for him. After much soul searching, Boyce finally agrees, only to find that Paul doesn't need one -- at least not right now. Elsewhere, Stamps has moved in with Kim, but the two still aren't comfortable doing certain "personal" things in front of each other.
26	4	"Oh My Goddy"	Stan Lathan	Alyssa Forleiter & Andrew Lee & Michael J. S. Murphy	April 16, 2014	304	TBA
Boyce learns he has been nominated for a Greatness of Divinity award, casually known as a "Goddy", which Barton had won 16 times before him. In advance of the award voting, Boyce visits an area prison with Stamps and his video camera to better publicize his second chance program. While there, he allows an habitual escapee (Bob Clendenin) to be unshackled, inadvertently getting him shot during an escape attempt. Meanwhile, Boyce's full schedule has Lolli fighting for his attention. She sets up a striptease in his office, only to have Barton and the church elders walk in on her.
27	5	"Back in the Day"	Stan Lathan	Pat Bullard	April 23, 2014	306	TBA
One of Boyce's old stage jackets, coupled with Kim and Stamps fighting, leads Boyce and Lolli to reflect on some rocky times during the first few months of their relationship, when Boyce was singing in Las Vegas. Deion Sanders guest stars as one of Lolli's brief flings.
28	6	"Daddy Issues"	Stan Lathan	Carla Banks Waddles	April 30, 2014	305	TBA
Barton, Boyce and Stamps take a road trip to buy back a 1968 Ford Mustang that Barton once owned. Just before they leave, Kim tells Lolli that she's pregnant and Lolli leaks the information to Boyce. While trying to keep from telling Stamps, Boyce harps on him during the entire trip to start being more responsible. Stamps eventually gets the news out of Boyce, before learning from Kim that her test was a false positive.
29	7	"My Sweet Lord"	Stan Lathan	Michael Curtis & Roger S. H. Schulman	May 7, 2014	307	TBA
After a blood test shows that Boyce is at risk for diabetes, he cancels the church's annual bake-off. This upsets the parishioners, to the point where they all (including Lolli) decide to take the contest underground. Elsewhere, Stamps starts avoiding Kim in the bedroom following the pregnancy scare, and Barton tries his luck at stand-up comedy.
30	8	"Moving on Up"	Stan Lathan	Carla Banks Waddles & David M. Matthews	May 14, 2014	308	0.77
Lester, now a newly-certified real estate agent, helps Boyce and Lolli find their dream condo. But soon after they move in, their space is encroached by Barton, Stamps, Kim, Lyric and Lyric's new "drummer-slash-boyfriend". Later, when Lester finds a buyer for the Ballentines' house, Boyce and Lolli start to pine for their old home.

=== Season 4 (2015) ===
No. overall	No. in season	Title	Directed by	Written by	Original release date	Prod. code	US viewers (millions)
31	1	"Oh Snow You Didn't"	Stan Lathan	Chris Kelly	March 18, 2015	401	N/A
A blizzard has shut down most of St. Louis for days, forcing Boyce and Lolli to spend far too much time indoors with family, including Boyce's irritating cousin Nikki (Sherri Shepherd). Things get worse as more unexpected guests arrive due to a road accident nearby. Meanwhile, Kim has started her medical internship in Atlanta, and Stamps is having difficulty adjusting to their new long-distance relationship.
32	2	"No Weddings and Ten Funerals"	Stan Lathan	Bill Martin & Mike Schiff	March 25, 2015	402	N/A
Having to administer an unusual number of funerals lately, Boyce worries that his congregation doesn't have enough young people. He visits a megachurch in town that his cousin Nikki likes to attend, hoping to get some ideas that will lure the youth to his flock. One of the recent funerals is for the church treasurer, and Barton names Nikki the new treasurer, meaning she will move to St. Louis permanently. Meanwhile, Stamps meets a young woman at one of the funerals, and accidentally leads the woman to believe that Kim has died.
33	3	"Shopping While Black"	Stan Lathan	Don D. Scott	April 1, 2015	403	N/A
While browsing in a high-end boutique, Lolli is constantly tailed by a white security guard who then accuses her of theft. A furious Boyce organizes a protest in front of the store, and he and Lolli are invited in to see the manager, who they are surprised to see is black. After apologies and an expensive gift to Lolli, the air appears to be cleared. But later, the security guard shows up at Boyce's church to say he was "only following store policy" in profiling Lolli, and he also says the manager Boyce talked to was brought in from a different store.
34	4	"Voice Over"	Stan Lathan	David Bickel	April 8, 2015	404	N/A
While waiting for a zoning decision that will allow Lolli to combine her new styling business with the salon, she has to use the Ballentine home for her customers. She asks Boyce to clear out his music memorabilia from the spare room, and he agrees after being told he can make a lot of money for Barton's soup kitchen if he posts the wares online for auction. But this only leads to disappointment when the items don't sell. Meanwhile, Stamps is going to be audited for the taxes he never paid on his cupcake truck business. After hearing from Barton that churches don't pay taxes, Stamps figures he can dodge the IRS by becoming a minister online.
35	5	"Home Boyce"	Stan Lathan	Kriss Turner	April 15, 2015	405	N/A
Nikki reveals to Boyce that she and her friends don't want to take Lolli along on their annual "Chocolate Sisters" weekend in Chicago, because Lolli no longer has as much fun since becoming a preacher's wife. Lolli invites herself along and is determined to show the girls she can still party like she used to. Meanwhile, Stamps is looking forward to spending some bro time with Boyce while the women are gone, but Boyce was looking forward to having the house to himself.
36	6	"Tell It Like It Isn't"	Stan Lathan	David J. Booth	April 22, 2015	406	N/A
Boyce likes to tell his flock stories about Gooch, a troublemaker who was his childhood friend, to make moral points. But when the real Gooch (Clifton Powell) shows up, he asks Boyce to stop and threatens to reveal a secret from their teenage days that Boyce has kept from Barton all these years. Meanwhile, Lolli deals with Yelp reviews of her salon that suggest she bullies her customers into taking her hair and fashion advice.
37	7	"Be My Ballentine"	Stan Lathan	Megan Neuringer	April 29, 2015	407	N/A
Lester laments that he can't find the right woman at the same time that Boyce and Lolli are trying to keep Nikki from tagging along wherever they go. They set up Nikki with Lester and the four have dinner together. When Lolli swoons over how romantic Lester is towards Nikki, Boyce realizes he hasn't romanced Lolli in a very long time and vows to step up his game. Meanwhile, Stamps has been using several dating apps to achieve meaningless hook-ups before deciding he wants more. He tries an app that promises to find his perfect match, but it backfires.
38	8	"Wife of a Preacherman"	Stan Lathan	David A. Katz	May 6, 2015	408	N/A
Lolli has to deliver the sermon at church when Boyce and Barton are late returning from a trip out of town. After a rough start, Lolli gets in a groove and the flock enjoys her sermon. Having caught the preaching bug, Lolli wants to share the sermon with Boyce at the next service, much to her husband's chagrin. Meanwhile, Stamps starts dating a single mother from the church, but the woman's successful young son does not think Stamps is good enough for her.
39	9	"Who Let the Dog In?"	Stan Lathan	Malik Sanon	May 13, 2015	409	N/A
Boyce becomes irritated with Nikki refusing to recognize his authority at the church, especially when she starts bringing her dog to work. Meanwhile, Barton's favorite barbershop closes down, so Lolli offers him a free haircut at her salon. Soon after, he invites a bunch of his friends to take advantage of Lolli's "first cut free" policy. But Barton's friends then start treating the salon like it's their old barbershop, and Lolli can't get rid of them.
40	10	"Mo' Momma, Mo' Problems"	Stan Lathan	Jameel Saleem	May 20, 2015	410	N/A
Lolli's mother CeCe (Anna Maria Horsford) arrives for a visit, along with Kim, whom CeCe has been living with in Atlanta. Lolli worries about possible fireworks between Boyce and CeCe, who have historically hated each other, but she is shocked when the two actually make a connection while getting pedicures. Meanwhile, Stamps tries to hide the fact that he's a lowly video game tester from Kim, instead pretending to be a V.P. of Research & Development for the video game company.
41	11	"Roar!"	Stan Lathan	Mike Schiff	May 27, 2015	411	N/A
Nikki is ensnared by a self-help guru (Jaleel White), and soon convinces Stamps and Lolli to follow the guy's techniques. Certain that the man is a fraud, Boyce attends his next event to prove his family members are being taken. Meanwhile, Barton has a sore tooth and refuses to go to the dentist because he's never had a cavity in his life.
42	12	"Busting Boyce"	Stan Lathan	Bill Martin	May 27, 2015	412	N/A
It is Boyce's fifth anniversary as pastor of the church, and some of the staff and parishioners have an unflattering bust of him made as a gift. When Boyce "accidentally" breaks the bust, most of the guests back out of his anniversary bash because they now view him as ungrateful. Lolli and Treasurer Nikki butt heads when Lolli's grandiose ideas for the party won't fit into the church's budget. In the end, Lolli determines that the only way to get good attendance is to make the anniversary party a roast of Boyce.

=== Season 5 (2016) ===
No. overall	No. in season	Title	Directed by	Written by	Original release date	Prod. code	US viewers (millions)
43	1	"Rev. Run"	Stan Lathan	Mike Schiff	March 30, 2016	501	0.445
Boyce and Stamps get the bureaucratic runaround while trying to pay Stamps' traffic ticket. Boyce invites the mayor to the church for an open discussion, but the mayor is a no-show, inspiring Boyce to run for mayor himself. Meanwhile, Lolli badly needs glasses but refuses to get them, seeing it as a sign that she's getting old.
44	2	"Boyce's Choices"	Stan Lathan	Bill Martin	April 6, 2016	502	0.398
After attempting to have the family run his campaign for mayor, Boyce goes behind their backs and hires Alicia (Missi Pyle) to be his campaign manager.
45	3	"Hangin' with Mr. Cupper"	Stan Lathan	Don D. Scott	April 13, 2016	503	0.301
As Boyce prepares for his first press conference as a candidate, Alicia discovers that a member of his staff has a criminal background that includes multiple Lewd Conduct charges. While Boyce emphasizes his belief in forgiveness and second chances, Alicia still urges him to fire the man. Meanwhile, Lolli reluctantly calls upon Stamps to help find an embarrassing photo of her on the internet, and scrub it before it can hurt Boyce's campaign.
46	4	"Leader of the PAC"	Stan Lathan	David Bickel	April 20, 2016	504	0.358
As Alicia continues to turn away Lolli's help on Boyce's campaign, Boyce suggests that Lolli form a Political Action Committee (PAC) that can operate independently from the official campaign. But when Lolli and Stamps put together a casino night to raise funds, they don't vet the guests thoroughly, leading to potential problems.
47	5	"Southern Discomfort"	Stan Lathan	Chris Kelly	April 27, 2016	505	0.308
Alicia encourages Boyce to attend a party hosted by local businessman Denny Doyle (David Koechner) in expectation of a big campaign contribution, but when Boyce and Lolli arrive, they find Doyle's home decorated with multiple Confederate flags. Meanwhile, Boyce agrees to let Barton find a temporary preacher for the church during the campaign, but it appears no one can measure up to Barton's lofty standards.
48	6	"Soul Train"	Stan Lathan	Kriss Turner	May 4, 2016	506	0.311
During their "chocolate chicks" weekend, Lolli and her friends get kicked off a wine-tasting train for being too loud and obnoxious. She wants Boyce to have her back and help her complain to the rail company, but Boyce secretly thinks the train employees were justified. Elsewhere, Alicia is wound tighter than usual and cracking the whip at campaign headquarters, so Stamps helps her with a little "stress relief".
49	7	"Sex, Lies, and Video Store"	Stan Lathan	David J. Booth	May 11, 2016	507	0.276
Paul and Robin run into Boyce and Lolli at the grocery store and invite themselves to the viewing party for Boyce's first campaign ad. The couple are as annoying as ever, so Boyce and Lolli finally let it be known that they can't stand their company. Meanwhile, Stamps is tired of being nothing more than a booty call for Alicia, and he shares his feelings with her.
50	8	"This Mud's for You"	Stan Lathan	David A. Katz	May 18, 2016	508	0.391
As Boyce prepares for his first televised debate against current Mayor Ron Saxby (Kevin Nealon), Lolli surprisingly makes friends backstage with Saxby's wife, Linda (Paula Marshall). Despite Alicia's encouragement to go negative, Boyce vows to have a clean debate that focuses on the issues. But the gloves come off when a story Lolli told Linda in a casual conversation comes out in the debate.
51	9	"No Bingo, No Peace"	Bill Martin	Malik Sanon	May 25, 2016	509	0.298
As retaliation for Boyce humiliating him in the debate, Saxby shuts off power and water to the Ballentine home, while also ordering construction crews to do work near the house at all hours. When garbage collectors stop picking up the Ballentines' trash, Boyce and Lolli try to appeal to the sanitation technicians union and turn them against Saxby, but it backfires when the union goes on strike and Boyce is blamed in the media. Meanwhile, Saxby also revokes the church's permit to use a recreation center for bingo, causing Barton to organize a sit-in.
52	10	"White Trash"	Cedric the Entertainer	Megan Neuringer	June 1, 2016	510	0.314
Still dealing with the fallout from the garbage collectors strike, Boyce and Lolli discover something that helps them turn the tables on Saxby, and they score a major victory in the media. However, their celebration is short-lived, as Barton starts having shortness of breath and has to go to the hospital. Also, Alicia announces she is going to work on a Senate campaign in Virginia when this election is over, and she offers Stamps a fundraising job.
53	11	"Numb and Number"	Stan Lathan	Elizabeth Rose Quinn	June 15, 2016	511	0.315
The latest poll results show Boyce trailing Saxby, 49% to 48%. While Barton recovers in the hospital, Boyce tries to convince the third candidate, a local dentist who holds the remaining 3% in the polls, to back out of the race and endorse him. Though Boyce comes through and gets the dentist to do this, he overhears Lolli saying she isn't looking forward to life in the spotlight as a politician's wife.
54	12	"Boyce Don't Cry"	Stan Lathan	Bill Martin & Mike Schiff	June 22, 2016	512	0.322
To get Lolli feeling more comfortable about being a mayor's wife, Boyce tells her they've survived major changes before and stayed strong, and convinces her that they will do so again. Stamps finally tells Boyce that he will be leaving to work with Alicia in Virginia a few days after the election. Boyce eventually does win the election and becomes Mayor of St. Louis.
