= Broadcast Blues =

Broadcast Blues may refer to:

- Broadcast Blues (documentary), a documentary film about the concentration of media ownership by corporations, FCC deregulation, and the Fairness Doctrine.
- Broadcast Blues episode of the Disney Channel comedy series Phil of the Future.
