= List of Jonas episodes =

Jonas is an American sitcom created as a Disney Channel Original Series. The series premiered on May 2, 2009 as Jonas for its first season, and was renamed Jonas L.A. for its second season ending on October 3, 2010 with 34 episodes produced.

== Series overview ==
Season	Episodes	Originally released	
Season	Episodes	First released	Last released
1	21	May 2, 2009	March 14, 2010
2	13	June 20, 2010	October 3, 2010

== Episodes ==
=== Season 1 (2009–10) ===
No. overall	No. in season	Title	Directed by	Written by	Original release date	Prod. code	US viewers (millions)
1	1	"Wrong Song"	Jerry Levine	Ivan Menchell	May 2, 2009	105	4.0
2	2	"Groovy Movies"	Paul Hoen	Ivan Menchell	May 9, 2009	102	2.2
3	3	"Pizza Girl (US)" "Slice of Life (UK)"	Paul Hoen	Heather MacGillvray & Linda Mathious	May 16, 2009	108	3.3
4	4	"Keeping It Real"	Lev L. Spiro	Michael Curtis & Roger S. H. Schulman	May 17, 2009	103	3.4
5	5	"Band's Best Friend"	Linda Mendoza	Kevin Kopelow & Heath Seifert	June 7, 2009	109	3.7
6	6	"Chasing the Dream"	Paul Hoen	Kevin Kopelow & Heath Seifert	June 14, 2009	104	2.5
7	7	"Fashion Victim"	Lev L. Spiro	Michael Curtis & Roger S.H. Schulman	June 21, 2009	101	4.0
8	8	"That Ding You Do"	Paul Hoen	Heather MacGillvray & Linda Mathious	June 28, 2009	106	3.5
9	9	"Complete Repeat"	Sean McNamara	Ivan Menchell	July 5, 2009	110	3.0
10	10	"Love Sick"	Paul Hoen	Michael Curtis & Roger S.H. Schulman	August 2, 2009	113	3.7
11	11	"The Three Musketeers"	Savage Steve Holland	Kim Duran & Zachary Rosenblatt	August 9, 2009	114	N/A
12	12	"Frantic Romantic (US)" "Undercover Paparazzi (UK)"	Jerry Levine	Ivan Menchell	August 16, 2009	116	N/A
13	13	"Detention"	Paul Hoen	Julie Sherman Wolfe	August 23, 2009	112	N/A
14	14	"Karaoke Surprise"	Paul Hoen	Michael Curtis & Heather MacGillvray	September 6, 2009	115	N/A
15	15	"Home Not Alone"	David Kendall	Linda Mathious & Heather MacGillvray	September 20, 2009	118	N/A
16	16	"Forgetting Stella's Birthday"	Paul Hoen	Zachary Rosenblatt & Kim Duran	September 27, 2009	117	N/A
17	17	"The Tale of the Haunted Firehouse"	Paul Hoen	Juile Sherman Wolfe	October 11, 2009	119	N/A
18	18	"Double Date"	Michael Curtis	Roger S.H. Schulman & Michael Curtis	November 8, 2009	120	N/A
19	19	"Cold Shoulder"	Paul Hoen	Heather MacGillvray & Linda Mathious	December 6, 2009 (Note: This episode can also be seen on the DVD "JONAS: Rocking the House" that was released on September 22, 2009, as a bonus feature. Scandinavia is the first song from the Jonas Brothers in which Kevin Jonas sings lead vocals.)	111	N/A
20	20	"Beauty and the Beat"	Savage Steve Holland	Kevin Kopelow & Heath Seifert	January 24, 2010 (Note: This episode can also be seen on the DVD "JONAS: Rocking the House" that was released on September 22, 2009 as a bonus feature.)	107	N/A
21	21	"Exam Jam"	Paul Hoen	Ivan Menchell	March 14, 2010	121	3.6

=== Season 2 (2010) ===
No. overall	No. in season	Title	Directed by	Written by	Original release date	Prod. code	US viewers (millions)
22	1	"House Party"	Paul Hoen	Lester Lewis	June 20, 2010	201	3.3
23	2	"Back to the Beach"	Eyal Gordin	Marc Warren	June 27, 2010	202	4.2
24	3	"Date Expectations"	Paul Hoen	Paul Ruehl	July 2, 2010	203	3.2
25	4	"And... Action"	Paul Hoen	Ned Goldreyer	July 11, 2010	204	3.7
26	5	"America's Sweethearts"	Eyal Gordin	Jessica Kaminsky	July 25, 2010	205	3.5
27	6	"The Secret"	Paul Hoen	Grace Parra	August 1, 2010	206	4.1
28	7	"A Wasabi Story"	John Scott	Danny Warren	August 8, 2010	207	N/A
29	8	"Up in the Air"	John Scott	Marc Warren	August 15, 2010	208	N/A
30	9	"Direct to Video"	Paul Hoen	Ned Goldreyer & Paul Ruehl	August 22, 2010	209	3.8
31	10	"The Flirt Locker"	Paul Hoen	Jennifer Fisher	August 29, 2010	210	3.4
32	11	"Boat Trip"	Savage Steve Holland	Lester Lewis	September 12, 2010	211	2.8
33	12	"On the Radio"	Savage Steve Holland	Jessica Kaminsky	September 26, 2010	212	2.8
34	13	"Band of Brothers"	Ryan Shiraki	Ryan Shiraki	October 3, 2010	213	3.5
