= Abigail Walker =

Abigail Walker may refer to:

- Fetch (Infamous), Abigail "Fetch" Walker, a character from the Infamous video game series
- Abby Walker, a character from American television series Walker: Independence
- Abby Walker, American actress
- Abi Walker (born 1982), Scottish field hockey player
