= Michael Curtis (TV producer) =

American television producer and writer

- Occupation: Producer • Writer
- Years active: 1988–present
- Known for: Creator of JONAS and Executive Producer on Friends

Michael Curtis is a television producer and writer known for Friends and Disney Channel's Phil of the Future and Jonas.

== Early life ==
A Navy brat from year zero, Michael John Curtis was born at the Naval Submarine Base New London in Connecticut. He lived in various locations around the United States including Charleston, South Carolina, Dam Neck Naval Base (Training Support Center Hampton Roads), Virginia, and overseas in Wollongong, Australia. Curtis attended White Point Elementary School in San Pedro, California (where he was awarded "Most Books Read") for 5th grade. and Fallbrook Union High School in Fallbrook, California.

== Career ==
He was a writer and executive producer of Friends during seasons 2 to 5 and also executive producer (with Roger S. H. Schulman) of Disney Channel's Phil of the Future (season 2, but not season 1). In 2008–2009 he worked with the Jonas Brothers and the Disney Channel as executive producer and co-creator of the series Jonas (Emmy Award nominated season 1, but not season 2). He co-wrote the biblical mockumentary The Making of '...And God Spoke' which had its theatrical debut at the Sundance Film Festival, and directed the series finale of Phil of the Future, "Back to the Future (Not the Movie)" and the season 1 finale of Jonas, "Double Date". He was co-founder of "Mantis Productions" (2007–2017) alongside Roger S.H. Schulman, co-creator of Jonas and the actual writer of Shrek.}

In 2009, Curtis earned a PhD in religion from the Universal Life Church.

== Filmography ==
=== Film ===
Year	Title	Contribution	Notes
1988	Return of the Killer Tomatoes!	Property Assistant	
1988	Party Line	Second Second Assistant Director	
1988	Phantasm II	Production Assistant	
1988	Survival Quest	Production Staff	
1988	976-EVIL	Production Assistant	
1989	Tax Season	Second Second Assistant Director	
1989	Veiled Threat	Second Assistant Director	
1989	Think Big	Second Assistant Director	
1989	The Banker	Second Assistant Director	
1990	The First Power	Second Second Assistant Director	
1990	Crash and Burn	Second Assistant Director	Direct-to-Video
1990	Kid	Second Assistant Director	
1990	Arduous Moon	First Assistant Director	Short film
1992	Falling from Grace	First Assistant Director	
1992	World Song	First Assistant Director	Short film
1992	Little Sister	Second Assistant Director	
1992	Miracle Beach	Second Assistant Director	
1993	The Making of '...And God Spoke'	Writer	Screenplay

=== Television ===
Year	Title	Contribution	Notes
1988	40th Annual Primetime Emmy Awards	Production Staff	Award ceremony
1992	Dream On	Writer	2 episodes
1992	The Wonder Years	Writer	Episode: "Scenes from a Wedding"
1992	Great Scott!	Executive Story Editor/Writer	Executive Story Editor of 12 episodes Writer of Episode: "Stripe Gripe"
1993	Daddy Dearest	Executive Story Editor/Writer	Executive Story Editor of 13 episodes Writer of Episode: "Thanks, But No Thanks"
1995	Double Rush	Writer	2 episodes
1995–1999	Friends	Producer/Executive Producer/Co-Executive Producer/Executive Story Editor/Writer	Producer of 25 episodes Executive Producer of 24 episodes Co-Executive Producer of 24 episodes Executive Story Editor of 24 episodes Writer of 12 episodes Nominated – Primetime Emmy Award for Outstanding Comedy Series (1999) - Nominated Golden Globe Award for Comedy Series (1998)
1999	Work with Me	Co-Executive Producer/Writer	Episode: "Time Apart?"
2000–2001	The Weber Show	Co-Executive Producer/Writer	Co-Executive Producer of 17 episodes Writer of 3 episodes
2002	Nikki	Executive Producer/Writer	Executive Producer of 19 episodes Writer of Episode: "Welcome to the Rest of Your Life"
2003	Run of the House	Consulting Producer	Television Series starring Joey Lawrence, Margo Harshman, Mo Gaffney
2003	Old School	Executive Producer	Television Pilot starring Natasha Lyonne, John Krasinski, Jorge Garcia
2003–2013	The Joe Schmo Show	Head Writer/Writer	Head Writer of 9 episodes Writer of 7 episodes
2004	Humor Me aka "The Lost Pilots""	Executive Producer/Writer	Television Pilot starring Dane Cook
2005	Love, Inc.	Consulting Producer/Writer	Consulting Producer of 5 episodes Writer of Episode: "Thick and Thin"
2006	Phil of the Future	Director/Writer/Executive Producer	Director of Episode: "Back to the Future (Not the Movie)"; Writer of 3 episodes Executive Producer of 22 episodes
2006	Haversham Hall	Executive Producer/Writer	Television Pilot starring Aly Michalka & AJ Michalka
2009–2010	Jonas	Co-Creator/Director/Writer/Executive Producer	Co-Creator of 24 episodes Director of Episode: "Double Date"; Writer of 3 episodes Executive Producer of 21 episodes Teen Choice Award for Choice TV Breakout Show (2009); Nominated – Primetime Emmy Award for Outstanding Children's Program (2010)
2013–2014	The Soul Man	Writer/Consulting Producer	Writer of 4 episodes Consulting Producer of 13 episodes
2014–2015	Melissa & Joey	Consulting Producer/Writer/Co-Executive Producer	Consulting Producer of 17 episodes Writer of 5 episodes Co-Executive Producer of 5 episodes
2016–2018	Bizaardvark	Co-Executive Producer/Writer	Co-Executive Producer of 22 episodes Writer of 3 episodes
