= Jonas (TV series) =

Disney Channel series starring the Jonas Brothers

- Also known as: Jonas L.A.
- Genre: Teen sitcom
- Created by: Michael Curtis; Roger S. H. Schulman
- Developed by: Disney Channel
- Starring: Kevin Jonas; Joe Jonas; Nick Jonas; Chelsea Staub; Nicole Anderson; John Ducey
- Opening theme: "Live to Party" by Jonas Brothers
- Ending theme: "Live to Party" (Instrumental)
- Composer: Kenneth Burgomaster
- Country of origin: United States
- Original language: English
- No. of seasons: 2
- No. of episodes: 34 (list of episodes)

Production
- Executive producers: Michael Curtis; Roger S. H. Schulman; Paul Hoen; Lester Lewis
- Producer: Mark Spitz
- Production locations: Hollywood Center Studios, Hollywood, California
- Camera setup: Film; Single-camera
- Running time: 25 minutes
- Production companies: It's a Laugh Productions; Mantis Productions

Original release
- Network: Disney Channel
- Release: May 2, 2009 – October 3, 2010

Jonas (also known as Jonas L.A. for the second season), is a Disney Channel Original Series created by Michael Curtis and Roger S. H. Schulman, starring the Jonas Brothers. The pilot was filmed in September 2008, the series premiered on Disney Channel on May 2, 2009, and became available on demand starting on April 25, 2009.

Jonas was the first Disney Channel Original Series since Phil of the Future not to be shot on videotape in a multi-camera format, be filmed before a live studio audience, or use a laugh track. The series was the first on the network to premiere on a Saturday night, part of a deliberate strategy by Disney to open up the night to original programming.

On November 9, 2009, it was announced that Jonas was being picked up for a second season. On May 5, 2010, it was revealed that the name of the series was changed to Jonas L.A., reflecting the move to Los Angeles, making it the first Disney Channel sitcom to have the show's main setting change during the course of the series. The second season premiered on June 20, 2010, and ended on October 3, 2010. In November 2010, the series was canceled after two seasons.

== Development ==
Following the Jonas Brothers guest appearance on the Disney Channel Series Hannah Montana for an episode "Me and Mr. Jonas and Mr. Jonas and Mr. Jonas", development for a TV series starring the band began.

The original concept for the TV series was about the band playing concerts as a cover while working as government secret agents to save the world and was entitled J.O.N.A.S. (an acronym which stood for "Junior Operatives Networking as Spies"). At the same time, they tried to hide their double lives from their mother and Frankie. Meanwhile, Stella, ignorant of the Jonas' double lives, dated each of the famous brothers without informing the others and reported the details in her teen magazine column. Said Staub, "So pretty much the entire show, it's all of us lying to each other, and kind of everything backfiring, and us getting caught in awkward situations." She described the concept as, "like The Monkees and a little of bit of Mr. & Mrs. Smith. There's going to be fun action sequences and still be a sitcom".

The original J.O.N.A.S. pilot was shot in 2007, but the 2007–2008 Writers Guild of America strike impeded progress. However, Disney Channel Asia aired part of it during the sneak peek 2008. Instead, Disney Channel filmed a mini reality show, the 2008 Disney Channel Original Short Series Jonas Brothers: Living the Dream, which followed the Jonas Brothers on a concert tour and premiered May 16. A few weeks later on June 20, 2008, the Disney Channel Original Movie Camp Rock, in which the brothers starred as the fictional band "Connect 3", debuted. The Jonas Brothers also released Jonas Brothers: The 3D Concert Experience, a Disney Digital 3-D concert film. "After this rush of releases, the Jonas Brothers became too popular to imagine them as anything but more dramatic versions of themselves," explained executive producer Michael Curtis. "The spy concept was very big and very ambitious and it started to not feel quite right. As the band got bigger and bigger, doing a show that captured more of their real lives and trying to turn that into a more grounded, real version of what they might be doing became more interesting to do and more fun to do." "It is now about us being a band and balancing a normal life," Nick Jonas told Access Hollywood. The title of the series changed from J.O.N.A.S. to JONAS, dropping the acronym but remaining in all capitals. The pilot for the actual show was eventually filmed in September 2008.

Producers have drawn connections between Jonas and productions by earlier bands. Show creator and producer Roger S. H. Schulman claims that "It's hard not to make parallel comparisons to The Beatles in 1962 and 1963 when you see the kind of response that the Jonas Brothers' fans have to them," and describes the 1964 A Hard Day's Night and 1965 Help! as "very much a template" for the series. Producers and critics have also compared the series to The Monkees, a popular but short-lived mid-1960s television comedy also following a real life band. At the Television Critics Association winter press tour in January 2009, Gary Marsh, entertainment president of Disney Channel Worldwide, described Jonas as a cross between The Monkees and Flight of the Conchords. The Chicago Sun-Times remarks that Joe Jonas parallels "goofy Micky Dolenz", Kevin Jonas "quirky Michael Nesmith", and Nick Jonas "dreamy Davy Jones". The Jonas Brothers reportedly watched episodes of The Partridge Family and The Monkees "for literally three days straight" for inspiration.

== Characters ==
=== Main ===
Cast of Jonas

- Joseph "Joe" Lucas (Joe Jonas) is known as the teen heartthrob of the group. He performs lead vocals, as well as keyboards and the rhythm guitar for the brothers' band, JONAS. Girl crazy and flirtatious, Joe will go to any length to get a girl to like him. He is shown to be the most superficial and appearance oriented member of the band, and is obsessed with his hair. Joe tends to be goofier than Nick, but is not quite as quirky as Kevin. Joe likes stuffed animals that make noises. His pockets and backpack are seemingly bottomless and capable of holding comically large quantities. He always carries a blue panda pencil with him. Joe and Stella – the brothers' childhood friend and band's stylist – are shown to have mutual romantic feelings for one another from the beginning, but both agree that they will not go out, as a potential break-up could ruin both their longtime friendship and working relationship. However, this agreement does nothing to quash Joe's crush on Stella, and he often flirts with her and tries to spend as much time with her as possible. Near the end of season 1, in the episode "Double Date", Joe and Stella kiss, resolving their romantic tension. They soon decide to become a couple. When the brothers move to Los Angeles, Joe decides to spend his time exploring a career in acting and the film industry. He lands a role in a movie with famous actress Vanessa Page. In the first episode of season 2, "House Party", Stella witnesses Joe hugging Vanessa, which hurts her and leads to her telling Joe that she'd rather they stay friends. Following the breakup, Joe becomes very jealous when Ben asks Stella out and she accepts. Joe then decides to pursue Vanessa. With Stella dating Ben and Joe dating Vanessa, they still have feelings for one another – however, both parties are oblivious to this fact. Joe eventually breaks up with Vanessa after discovering that she dislikes Stella, whom he loves. At the end of the series, he and Stella reunite as a couple, after they both become aware of their feelings.
- Kevin Percy Lucas (Kevin Jonas) is the oldest of the brothers, and is usually seen as wild and goofy. Kevin is known to think outside of the box, and likes to imagine wacky animals, such as an otter that can play the trumpet and a bear in a bikini. Kevin often comes up with plans that are insane or impossible, which can make him look naïve and unintelligent. However, he shows glimpses of profound thoughts and intellect, and sometimes comes up with genuinely good ideas. Kevin is shown to be very honest, as he's a poor liar; when he lies, his voice becomes comically high-pitched. He owns a full moving rack of guitars, and likes woodland creature stuffed animals. He plays lead guitar and does backup vocals in the brothers' band JONAS, though he once performed lead vocals. He had a crush on a girl that he met in Scandinavia and, when that romance didn't work out, fell for another girl from France, which suggests that he has an affinity for foreign girls. He is more of a risk taker than his brothers. Despite sometimes having a bit of a rivalry (like when they're both vying to get a spot in Justin Timberlake's ping-pong tournament), Nick and Kevin are very close. He also enjoys filmmaking, which is shown in "Direct to Video", where Kevin wants to direct the band's new music video. His middle name, Percy, is revealed by Nick in "Date Expectations".
- Nicholas "Nick" Lucas (Nick Jonas) is portrayed as being the calm and collected member of the band. He has many short-lived relationships, and his family has criticized him for falling in love too fast. Nick is much more serious than his brothers, sometimes losing his patience with Kevin's silly antics. Nick likes stuffed animals that swim. Nick is the drummer for JONAS, and he occasionally plays the guitar and rhythm guitar for the band. When he was a baby, according to his family, he never smiled – Nick claims he was waiting for his teeth to come in (however, when Joe asks what his excuse is now, he does not have a response). Nick is also the mastermind of creative plans gone awry, and can keep a level head amid chaos. He is also seen baking many times in the show; Kevin is unable to resist his blue cookies. In season 2, he develops a relationship with Macy Misa, being smitten by her transformation into a different and more relaxed person who no longer acts like a rabid fangirl to the band. His moments with Macy tend to get interrupted by DZ, to humorous effect. In "The Secret", Nick is forced to watch over Big Man's niece, Kiara (China Anne McClain), who is aware that he and Macy are dating. In exchange for her silence about their relationship, Nick begrudgingly agrees to do a collaboration with her. He ends up telling the rest of the friends about his relationship through the song that he and Kiara made. Nick is seen to be very thoughtful, and makes a handmade mug for Macy for their one-month anniversary, after learning from Kevin that she likes homemade gifts. Nick suffers from Type 1 diabetes much like Nick Jonas does in real life.
- Stella Malone (Chelsea Staub) is Jonas's stylist. She is best friends with Macy and is the brothers' childhood friend – she has known the boys since she was three. Stella and Joe both know that they like one another, but don't date, as they don't want a potential breakup to ruin their friendship. However, she gets jealous if she sees Joe with another girl, which was shown when she thought Joe and Macy were dating. Stella created an automated outfit selector called the StellaVator, and is constantly trying to adapt clothes to Jonas' hectic lifestyle. She gets annoyed when her outfits get ruined, which happens a lot more than she'd like. She is addicted to texting, and always has her phone on her. Stella also tries her best to help Macy talk to Jonas normally, instead of like an obsessed fangirl. Unlike her best friend Macy, who is a great athlete, Stella is horrible at sports. She is, however, an excellent seamstress, and once created a dozen girls' volleyball uniforms with very little notice. In the episode "Double Date", Joe and Stella kiss, and soon become a couple. However, at the beginning of season 2, she sees Joe hugging Vanessa Page, and assumes that they are romantically involved. The incident with Vanessa makes her decide that she only wants to be friends with Joe, rather than be in a relationship. While hiking with Macy, she meets a boy named Ben, whom she goes out with, much to Joe's disappointment. In the episode "America's Sweethearts", Stella is jealous when Joe's producer asks him to kiss Vanessa. After Joe says that he likes Vanessa, she lies to him, saying that Vanessa doesn't like him back. Stella feels guilty, and admits that she lied. Joe and Vanessa date, and Stella tries her best to not be jealous and spends time with Ben. Neither Joe nor Stella have lost their feelings for one another, however, after Vanessa tells Joe that she doesn't like Stella, Joe breaks up with her. After realizing that they both love one another, Stella and Joe become a couple in the series finale.
- Macy Misa (Nicole Anderson) is Stella's best friend, as well as the president of JONAS's fan club. In season 1, whenever she approaches the members of Jonas, she becomes incredibly nervous and excited, and either faints or accidentally injures them. She commonly steps on the boys' feet, or hits them in the head with her sports equipment. She often refers to each boy as "(first name) of JONAS." When she dates a boy, Randolph, she tries to make him into a JONAS member, even calling the boy "Nick" as a "nickname". Macy is very athletic, and plays on a number of sports teams. She also works in her mother's thrift store, called Misa's Pieces. Macy is revealed to be tone deaf, so much so that, according to Stella, they once called Animal Control under the belief that Macy's singing was an injured manatee at a softball game. Macy's dedicated fangirl attitude about Jonas changes into a real friendship with the boys late in season 1, as she begins to see them as people rather than popstars. In the episode "Frantic Romantic", she and Stella attend a Hollywood Private Party with the boys. In season 2, Macy is shown to have greatly changed, no longer being a passionate fan. This different attitude and the appearance of her real personality intrigues Nick, who eventually falls for her. Her moments with Nick tend to get interrupted by DZ, to a comical effect. In the episode "The Secret", it officially shows that Macy and Nick are dating – however, they want to keep their relationship a secret. It is revealed in a later episode that she has many brothers, and they are a big golfing family. It is also revealed that her mother taught her to play golf and her family only gives handmade gifts. Nick tries to please Macy by making her a mug for their one-month anniversary. Nick and Macy's relationship is eventually revealed, and by the end of the series, they are openly dating.
- Thomas "Tom" Lucas (John Ducey; main, season 1; guest, season 2) is Joe, Nick, Kevin, and Frankie's father and Sandy's husband, as well as the manager of Jonas. He is sometimes the voice of reason when his boys have crushes on girls. In his downtime, he often plays hide and seek with Frankie. He is usually nervous when famous people interview the band. It is also shown that he likes woodland creature stuffed animals that can swim and make noises, which are combinations of his son's favorite toys.

=== Recurring ===
- Frankie Lucas (Frankie Jonas) is the youngest Lucas brother. He is constantly trying to get in the Jonas spotlight. Frankie hopes to get a chance to perform with the band, but his brothers don't think that is likely. Frankie can move very fast, and is an expert at hide-and-seek. He's also very skilled in getting his way. He was raised in New Jersey, and enjoys playing ping-pong. He has a crush on Macy, and was briefly mad at Nick for dating her, even going to lengths to try and "steal" her.
- Big Man (Robert "Big Rob" Feggans) is the bodyguard who escorts the band everywhere. He is seen to live with the boys in L.A. He has a niece, Kiara.
- Sandy Lucas (Rebecca Creskoff; season 1) is the mother of Kevin, Joe, Nick, and Frankie, and is Tom's wife. She's down to earth and always proud of her sons, despite their mistakes. Mrs. Lucas just wants to have a normal family, but has acknowledged that it may not be possible with famous children. She is mostly an off-screen character.
- Van Dyke Tosh (Chuck Hittinger; season 1) is Stella's occasional love interest, who habitually makes Joe jealous. Van Dyke asks Stella on a date in the episode "Double Date", which causes Joe to crash their date.
- Mrs. Snark (Tangelina Rouse; season 1) is the biology/drama teacher who loves Joe, Nick, and Kevin. Much to Joe's chagrin, she often gives them preferential treatment in school, sometimes causing tension between the boys and other students. Her niece is a huge Jonas fan.
- Dennis Zimmer "DZ" (Adam Hicks; season 2) is a new friend who the band meets while in L.A. He is the son of a very wealthy and successful record producer. He shows the band the "hot spots" in Los Angeles. He is very fun and outgoing. He is also an aspiring rapper, and tries to get his father to listen to his songs but can never get the chance.
- Vanessa Paige (Abby Pivaronas; season 2) is a popular actress who co-stars with Joe in a big-time film, "Forever April". She is also briefly his girlfriend on the show, until he breaks up with her because she dislikes Stella.
- Lisa Malone (Beth Crosby; season 2) is Stella's aunt who Stella and Macy stay with while residing in Los Angeles. She doesn't want them to date rock stars, as she made the mistake of dating rock stars twelve times. She appears in nearly all of the episodes in season 2, despite not being a main character.
- Mona Klein (Debi Mazar; season 2) is the director of Forever April. In "Up in the Air", after Joe and Vanessa break up, Mona gives some advice to Joe, saying "when you find something real, never let it go".
- Kiara Tyshanna (China Anne McClain; season 2) is the niece of Big Man. She is the first one to find out about Nick and Macy dating.

== Production ==
The series was shot at Hollywood Center Studios, which has also been the home to several other Disney Channel sitcoms over the years including The Suite Life on Deck and Wizards of Waverly Place. The series was originally set in New Jersey for the first season, with comedic storylines on the boys trying to lead "normal" lives while being famous. For the second season, the setting changed to Los Angeles, and shifted towards a more drama, serial-driven story line.

In November 2010, Disney Channel officially announced that Jonas L.A. would not return for a third season. The network did mention, however, that they would be working with the Jonas Brothers in the future. Jonas L.A. remains the only Disney Channel Original Series produced by It's a Laugh Productions to not be filmed before a live studio audience.

In their 2019 documentary Chasing Happiness, the brothers revealed that they regretted doing the series. All three agreed that the series was "not good" and felt that it negatively impacted their image. Nick also felt that the second season in particular limited their growth as a band.

=== Casting ===
Nicole Anderson also auditioned for the role of Stella, but actress Chelsea Staub ended up winning the part. According to Staub, her previous work with director Sean McNamara helped her land the role. After the series plot changed, producers decided to create a best friend for Stella and offered Anderson, Staub's real life best friend, the role of Macy.

Jonas was intended to star Kevin, Nick, and Joe Jonas, who lend their first names to their television counterparts. The role of Frankie Lucas was also created with Frankie Jonas in mind. In addition, Robert "Big Rob" Feggans, the Jonas Brothers real-life head of security, plays The Big Man, the JONAS bodyguard.

== Episodes ==
Season	Episodes	Originally released	
Season	Episodes	First released	Last released
1	21	May 2, 2009	March 14, 2010
2	13	June 20, 2010	October 3, 2010

== Broadcast ==
=== Season 1 ===
The series originally premiered on May 2, 2009, on Disney Channel. It premiered on June 12, 2009, on Family Channel, on June 15, 2009, on Disney Channel (Australia and New Zealand) as well as on TV2 in New Zealand on April 17, 2010, on August 9, 2009, on Disney Channel (Southeast Asia), on September 11, 2009, on Disney Channel (UK and Ireland), on October 10, 2009, on Disney Channel (Europe, Middle East and Africa), an on November 30, 2009, on Disney Channel (India).

=== Season 2 ===
The second season originally premiered on June 20, 2010. It premiered on July 23, 2010, in Canada, on September 6, 2010, in Australia, on the same date in New Zealand and on May 31, 2012, on TV2, on October 23, 2010, in Southeast Asia, on August 13, 2010, in the UK and Ireland, and on September 18, 2010, in South Africa.

== Home media ==
Season 1

Title	Release date	Episodes
JONAS: Rockin' The House	September 22, 2009 (USA)	Wrong Song, Groovy Movies, Pizza Girl, Chasing the Dream, Band's Best Friend, Cold Shoulder, Beauty and the Beat
Bonus features are five episodes from the series plus two never-before aired episodes and a special feature titled You've Just Been Jo' Bro'd: Surprising Chelsea Staub.
I Heart JONAS	January 26, 2010 (USA)	Karaoke Surprise, Love Sick, Frantic Romantic, The Three Musketeers, Forgetting Stella's Birthday, Double Date, Fashion Victim.
Bonus features are seven episodes from the series and a special feature titled You've Just Been Jo' Bro'd: Surprising Jordin Sparks.
Volume 1: Keeping It Real	March 3, 2010 (Australia) August 16, 2010 (UK)	Wrong Song, Groovy Movies, Pizza Girl, Keeping it Real, Band's Best Friend, Chasing the Dream, Fashion Victim.
Special feature titled You've Just Been Jo' Bro'd: Part 1.
Volume 2: Rockstars In the House	June 2, 2010 (Australia) September 6, 2010 (UK)	That Ding You Do, Complete Repeat, Love Sick, Three Musketeers, Frantic Romantic, Detention, Karaoke Surprise.
Special feature titled You've Just Been Jo' Bro'd: Part 2.
Volume 3: Ready to Rock	August 4, 2010 (Australia) September 20, 2010 (UK)	Home Not Alone, Forgetting Stella’s Birthday, The Tale Of The Haunted Firehouse, Double Date, Cold Shoulder, Beauty And The Beat, Exam Jam.
Special feature titled Dylan & Cole Sprouse Blu-ray/DVD Featurette.

== Video game ==
Disney Interactive Studios released a video game based on the series for the Nintendo DS in America on November 10, 2009. The game is based on many of the sets used in the TV show, including the school. The player can play as any of the brothers and play 6 concerts. The game was not well received, mainly due to poor graphics and bad gameplay, as stated on IGN, only earning a score of 4.0 out of ten.

== Music ==
=== Season 1 ===
Jonas

Soundtrack album by Jonas Brothers
- Recorded: 2009
- Genre: Pop rock
- Label: Walt Disney
- Producer: John Fields

The soundtrack for the first season was never released. Only the songs from the second season were included in the official soundtrack, Jonas L.A.. Some songs from the first season were never leaked or released complete.

==== Songs information ====
- The full version of "Live to Party" was featured on Disney Channel Playlist, the video game "Jonas" and a UK bonus track for their third album, A Little Bit Longer.
- The full version of "Give Love a Try" was featured on Radio Disney Jams, Vol. 12.
- The full version of "Keep It Real" was featured on Lines, Vines, and Trying Times and the video game Jonas.
- The full versions of "Tell Me Why", "Work It Out", "Love Sick" and "Time Is on Our Side" were featured on the video game Jonas. The full versions of the six songs of the video game were uploaded on YouTube in January 2010.

==== Track listing ====
No.	Title	Episode	Length
1.	"Give Love a Try" (Nick Jonas and Bridgit Mendler solo)	"Wrong Song"	3:23
2.	"Pizza Girl"	"Pizza Girl"	2:16
3.	"Keep It Real"	"Keeping It Real", "Exam Jam" and "The Secret"	2:51
4.	"We Got to Work It Out"	"Band's Best Friend", "Beauty and the Beat" and "Exam Jam"	3:18
5.	"Why"	"Fashion Victim", "Detention" and "The Three Musketeers"	2:53
6.	"Blue Danube"	"That Ding You Do"	1:10
7.	"I Did It All Again"	"Complete Repeat"	2:40
8.	"Love Sick"	"Love Sick" and "Exam Jam"	3:19
9.	"Give Love a Try" (Joe Jonas solo)	"Karaoke Surprise" and "Exam Jam"	1:55
10.	"Time Is on Our Side"	"Forgetting Stella's Birthday" and "Exam Jam"	2:38
11.	"Scandinavia" (Kevin Jonas solo)	"Cold Shoulder" and "Exam Jam"	1:33
12.	"Live to Party"	All episodes	2:55

=== Music videos ===
Year	Album	Title
2009	Jonas	"Give Love a Try (Nick Jonas Version)"
2009	Jonas	"Pizza Girl"
2009	Jonas	"Keep It Real"
2009	Jonas	"We Got to Work It Out"
2009	Jonas	"Why"
2009	Jonas	"Blue Danube"
2009	Jonas	"I Did It All Again"
2009	Jonas	"Love Sick"
2009	Jonas	"Give Love a Try (Joe Jonas version)"
2009	Jonas	"Time Is on Our Side"
2009	Jonas	"I Left My Heart in Scandinavia"
2009	Jonas	"Live to Party"
2010	Jonas L.A.	"Feelin' Alive"
2010	Jonas L.A.	"L.A. Baby (Where Dreams Are Made Of)"
2010	Jonas L.A.	"Your Biggest Fan"
2010	Jonas L.A.	"Critical"
2010	Jonas L.A.	"Hey You"
2010	Jonas L.A.	"Things Will Never Be the Same"
2010	Jonas L.A.	"Fall"
2010	Jonas L.A.	"Summer Rain"
2010	Jonas L.A.	"Drive"
2010	Jonas L.A.	"Invisible"
2010	Jonas L.A.	"Make It Right"
2010	Jonas L.A.	"Chillin' in the Summertime"
2010	Jonas L.A.	"Set This Party Off"

== Reception ==
=== Critical reception ===
Jonas received mixed reviews for its premiere. Ken Tucker of Entertainment Weekly called the show "The Monkees for millennials" and enjoyed the featured Jonas Brothers music. Variety magazine reviewer Brian Lowry believed that Jonas Brothers' adorers would be pleased with the result, and that those who are not fans would still find an amiable charm within the series. Paige Wiser of the Chicago Sun-Times found the series better than Hannah Montana, but commented that Nick Jonas' reserved nature made him the weak link of the premiere episode and that the boys' amateur acting is "endearing until they play a scene opposite someone with real comedic timing – like John Ducey." The New York Times' John Carmanica was also disappointed with Nick's performance, particularly because, according to Carmanica, he gives off the savviest air in the band's off screen life. Carmanica also criticizes the series' script as blithe, unfunny, and "seeded with profound cynicism", but praised the believable fraternal interactions and Kevin Jonas' acting.

=== Viewer reception ===
The series was the first series on Disney Channel to premiere on a Saturday night, part of a deliberate strategy by Disney to open up the night to original programming and compete with Nickelodeon's traditional dominance of the evening. The show was paired with the established series Wizards of Waverly Place, which moved from a Sunday early evening timeslot, in the 8 p.m. (Eastern Time) slot. The series debuted on Disney Channel on May 2, 2009, and drew a solid 4.00 million viewers in the US, 73% of which was female. While this amounted to Disney Channel's best ratings in the time slot in eight months, it was also Disney Channel's second-lowest rated live-action series premiere in nearly four years. The Hollywood Reporter comments that "Jonas didn't do poorly, exactly. [...] It's just that one expects the premiere of a show by a heavily promoted major Disney brand like the Jonas Brothers to make a bigger splash."

Viewership for the series second episode the following week fell sharply to nearly half its premiere audience—2.2 million total U.S. viewers and beyond cable's Top 100, which E!: Entertainment Television notes "in the grand scheme of things, is still a very good showing - unless you're trying to live up to the media's expectations for a world famous act." E! credits the decline to the premiere of Nickelodeon's hour-long iCarly special, "iDate a Bad Boy", which earned 6.5 million viewers. Ratings improved over the following episodes, and the New York Times reported, "If "Jonas" can dent ratings for iCarly [...] the brothers’ sitcom will be considered a big success internally. However, just weeks after its premiere Disney Channel moved Jonas and Wizards of Waverly Place to Sunday and Friday evenings, respectively, and began airing movies in its old timeslot. In its Sunday timeslot, Jonas has been doing well in key kids demographics and averaging 3.4 million viewers.

However, the move to Sundays and Fridays and declining ratings, along with the change in setting and ill-fated strategies in promoting the show would result in Disney's decision to pull the plug on "Jonas L.A." On November 8, 2010, it announced that the show would not return for a third season. In a statement from a Disney Channel spokesperson: "We've been fortunate to work with the enormously talented Jonas Brothers on several projects, including the Emmy-nominated series JONAS L.A.," adding that "We look forward to working with them on new projects in the future."

== Awards and nominations ==
Year	Award	Category	Recipient(s)	Result	Refs
2009	Teen Choice Awards	Choice TV Actor: Comedy	Jonas Brothers	Won	
2009	Teen Choice Awards	Choice TV: Breakout Star Female	Chelsea Staub	Nominated	
2009	Teen Choice Awards	Choice TV: Breakout Star Male	Frankie Jonas	Won	
2009	Teen Choice Awards	Choice TV: Breakout Show	Jonas	Won	
2010	Kids' Choice Awards	Favorite TV Actor	Joe Jonas	Nominated	
2010	Kids' Choice Awards	Favorite TV Actor	Nick Jonas	Nominated	
2010	Teen Choice Awards	Choice TV Actor: Comedy	Jonas Brothers	Won	
2010	Hollywood Teen TV Awards	Teen Pick Actress: Comedy	Chelsea Staub	Nominated	
2010	Primetime Emmy Awards	Outstanding Children's Program	Jonas	Nominated	
2010	Kids' Choice Awards Mexico	Favorite International Character Male	Joe Jonas	Nominated	
2010	Kids' Choice Awards Mexico	Favorite International Character Male	Nick Jonas	Nominated	
2010	Kids' Choice Awards Mexico	Favorite Show	Jonas L.A	Nominated	
2011	Kids' Choice Awards	Favorite TV Actor	Nick Jonas	Nominated	
2011	Kids' Choice Awards	Favorite TV Actor	Joe Jonas	Nominated	
