= Ghosting: The Spirit of Christmas =

2019 American television film

- Film poster
- Genre: Romantic comedy Christmas; Fantasy
- Screenplay by: Laura Donney
- Directed by: Theresa Bennett
- Starring: Aisha Dee; Kimiko Glenn; Kendrick Sampson; Jazz Raycole; Missi Pyle; LisaGay Hamilton
- Music by: Brian H. Kim
- Country of origin: United States
- Original language: English

Production
- Executive producers: Dan Bucatinsky; Lisa Kudrow; Tony Phelan; Joan Rater
- Producer: Tracey Jeffrey
- Cinematography: Amy Belling
- Editor: David Cordon
- Running time: 87 minutes
- Production companies: Freeform; Is or Isn't Entertainment; Midwest Livestock

Original release
- Network: Freeform
- Release: December 4, 2019

Ghosting: The Spirit of Christmas is a 2019 American Christmas fantasy romantic comedy television film. Directed by Theresa Bennett and written by Laura Donney, the film stars Aisha Dee, Kimiko Glenn, Kendrick Sampson, Jazz Raycole, Missi Pyle, and LisaGay Hamilton. The film premiered on Freeform on December 4, 2019.

== Plot ==
Following the best first date of her life, Jess is preoccupied with texting. She dies texting while driving and wakes up as a ghost. She has to settle unfinished business. With the help of her best friend Kara (Kimiko Glenn), they embark on a hilarious, bittersweet and final adventure, so that Jess can ascend to the afterlife.

== Cast ==
- Aisha Dee as Jess, a young woman who dies and has to settle unfinished business
- Kimiko Glenn as Kara, Jess' best friend who can see her as a ghost
- Kendrick Sampson as Ben, Jess' ongoing boyfriend who can also see her as a ghost
- Jazz Raycole as Mae, Ben's sister and Kara's ongoing girlfriend
- Missi Pyle as Chrissy, a lifestyle guru
- LisaGay Hamilton as Deb, Jess' mother

== Release ==
The film premiered on Freeform on December 4, 2019.

== Reception ==
The film was met with positive reviews, praising the performances, the concept, and romance. It drew 353,000 viewers in its premiere.

Christopher Ross of Glamour call it "the wildest, most delightful holiday movie you'll watch this year." Jamie Primeau of Cosmopolitan says that "the movie has all the key ingredients for made-for-TV Christmas movie magic: absurdity, romance, friendship, drama, and just the right amount of cheesiness."
