= Lise Simms =

American actress (born 1963)

- Born: Elisabeth Caroline Simms; March 17, 1963 (age 63); Southern Colorado, U.S.
- Occupations: Actress, dancer, designer, singer
- Years active: 1992–present
- Spouse: Terry Rhoads (until 2013; his death)
- Children: 2

Elisabeth Caroline "Lise" Simms (born March 17, 1963) is an American actress, designer, dancer, and singer.

== Career ==
=== Broadway and theater ===
Simms began her acting career at age 13. After graduating from high school, she started acting on Broadway in numerous plays, including Other People's Money, Mame, Can-Can, Sweet Charity and Bye Bye Birdie during the 1980s. She was a member of the original Los Angeles, California cast of Beauty and the Beast and toured around the world with A Chorus Line in 1986.

=== Television ===
Simms was the host of Style Network's Area. She had a recurring role on Sunset Beach, but is best known for her role as "Barbara Diffy", Phil's mom in the Disney Channel original series Phil of the Future, where she also played "The Timekeeper" in the episode "It's a Wonder-Phil Life". She had a recurring role as "Connie Wayne" in the soap opera The Young and the Restless and made guest appearances on Friends, Providence, MADtv, 3rd Rock from the Sun, Star Trek: Voyager, iCarly and many others. She performed for President Reagan in 1988's Great Performances at the White House series, which aired on the Public Broadcasting Service.

Simms was a co-host and interior designer on Home & Garden Television's Desperate Spaces. She and co-host and designer Daniel Kucan chose one room of a house and redecorated it in two days with only $2,500. Desperate Spaces premiered on January 1, 2008.

Simms had a guest spot on the February 3, 2009 episode of 90210 as Ty's mother, Louise Collins.

== Filmography ==
=== Film ===
- Perry Mason: The Case of the Heartbroken Bride (1992) - female guest
- The Dentist (1996) - Paula Roberts
- The Omega Code (1999) - talk show reporter
- Star Trek: Away Team (2001) - T'Andoria
- Dragonfly (2002) - nephrology desk nurse
- Suits on the Loose (2006) - Christine
- Snow Buddies (2008) - Meg

=== Television ===
- Sunset Beach (1997) - Nurse Kathy Baker (1998)
- The Young and the Restless (1973) - Connie Wayne (1999–2004)
- Area (2002) - herself
- Phil of the Future (2004–2006) - Barbara Diffy/Time Keeper
- Express Yourself (2001) - herself (2004–05)
- Desperate Spaces (2008) - herself
- The Generations Project - herself/host (2010-2012)

==== Guest appearances ====
- NCIS (2018) - Kenna Reynolds
- Bones (2013) - Aunt Alice
- 90210 (2009) - Louise Collins
- United States of Tara (2009) - Barnabeez Lawyer
- iCarly (2008) - Mrs. Linda Peeloff
- ER (2006) - Emcee
- Night Stalker (2005) - TV Reporter
- Quintuplets (2004) - Coach Allison
- Dragnet (2003) - Brenda
- My Wife and Kids (2003) - Flight Attendant
- Birds of Prey (2002) - Detective Grace Tanner
- Nikki (2001) - Stephanie
- The Geena Davis Show (2000) - Natalie
- Opposite Sex (2000) - Phil's mom
- Ladies Man (2000) - Shirl Henderson
- Veronica's Closet (2000) - Yoga Instructor
- Providence (1999) - Shelly
- Friends (1999) - Kara
- The Pretender (1998) - Reporter
- Star Trek: Voyager (1997) - Annorax's wife Episode: "Year of Hell"
- 3rd Rock from the Sun (1997) - Gabby
- Sisters (1996) - Female Reporter
- Maybe This Time (1996) - Suzi
- Ellen (1995) - Lesley
- MADtv (1995) - Executive #2
- Love & War (1995) - Female Customer #1
