= The Generations Project =

- Genre: Reality
- Directed by: Tyler Weston
- Presented by: Lise Simms
- Narrated by: Lise Simms
- Composer: Micah Dahl Anderson
- Country of origin: United States
- Original language: English
- No. of seasons: 3
- No. of episodes: 38

Production
- Executive producers: Kendall Wilcox; Andra Johnson Duke
- Producers: Marissa Bernhard; Raquel Marvez; Agustina Perez; Josh Wagner
- Cinematography: Ty Arnold; Brandon Christensen; Travis Cline; Cole Webley
- Editors: Irina Cline; Jared Cook; Shark J. Gillins; Andrew James; Q. Bryce Randall; Ted McCurdy; Seth Warburton; Jonathan Wright
- Camera setup: Multi-camera
- Running time: 60 minutes
- Production company: BYU Television

Original release
- Network: BYU Television
- Release: January 4, 2010 – March 19, 2012

The Generations Project is a reality television series produced by and shown on BYU Television that helps those who have questions about their family history investigate their own identities by embarking on a journey to uncover the lives and stories of their ancestors. During this journey each participant attempts to retrace their ancestors footsteps often participating in immersion experiences, meeting experts, and even sometimes connecting with family they never knew they had. As each participant on the show sets out on their journey they discover new details about the lives of their ancestors, answer questions about identity, about time and place, and even discover things about themselves. Overall this journey helps participants learn where they have been and make their own conclusions about where they are going. It premiered on January 4, 2010. Three seasons were released, comprising a total of 38 episodes.

The Generation Project's prototype logo, used in 2009

== Episodes ==
=== Season 1: 2010 ===
#	Original air date	Participant	Ref.
101	March 29, 2010	Lakia Holmes	
102	February 22, 2010	James Walker	
103	January 4, 2010	Lumina Infinite Gershfield	
104	February 8, 2010	Deanna LaMadrid-Jensen	
105	January 18, 2010	Katie Newbold	
106	January 11, 2010	Durrell Daniels	
107	February 1, 2010	John Searcy	
108	March 1, 2010	Andrea Ann Campbell	
109	March 22, 2010	Vicki Biss	
110	March 8, 2010	Gloria Squires	
111	February 15, 2010	Danielle Jones	
112	March 15, 2010	Boyd Mossman	
113	January 25, 2010	Maile Mossman	

=== Season 2: 2011 ===
#	Original air date	Participant	Ref.
201	May 9, 2011	Will	
202	June 6, 2011	Sam	
203	April 4, 2011	Kerry	
204	March 28, 2011	Xander & Carrie	
205	May 16, 2011	Nick	
206	May 23, 2011	Rachel	
207	May 30, 2011	Ty	
208	May 2, 2011	Tara	
209	April 18, 2011	N/A	
210	April 11, 2011	Emily	
211	April 25, 2011	Pj & Heidi	
212	June 13, 2011	Sean	

=== Season 3: 2011 - 2012 ===
#	Original air date	Participant	Ref.
301	October 1, 2011	Ed	
302	October 3, 2011	Matthew	
303	October 10, 2011	N/A	
304	November 7, 2011	Graham	
305	November 14, 2011	Rachel	
306	November 21, 2011	Roi	
307	December 19, 2011	Raquel	
308	December 12, 2011	Amber	
309	January 30, 2012	Nancy	
310	February 6, 2012	David	
311	March 5, 2012	Jill	
312	March 12, 2012	Eli	
313	March 19, 2012	Natalie	
