= The Making of '...And God Spoke' =

1994 film by Arthur Borman

- Directed by: Arthur Borman
- Screenplay by: Gregory S. Malins; Michael Curtis
- Story by: Arthur Borman; Mark Borman
- Produced by: Mark Borman; Richard Raddon
- Starring: Michael Riley; Stephen Rappaport; Michael Hitchcock; Andy Dick; Lou Ferrigno; Eve Plumb; Soupy Sales; Chris Kattan
- Cinematography: Lee Daniel
- Edited by: Wendey Stanzler
- Production company: Brookwood Entertainment
- Distributed by: Live Entertainment
- Release dates: September 1993 (Toronto Film Festival); September 23, 1994 (U.S.)
- Running time: 82 minutes
- Country: United States
- Language: English
- Box office: $62,598 (US/Canada)

The Making of ‘…and God Spoke’ is a 1993 mockumentary about the production of a film based on the Bible that follows a producer and director through the various stages of making a $15 million Hollywood film.

== Plot ==
The film follows a film production from pre-production to its release. The cast and crew have to deal with a variety of problems including a Noah's Ark that is too big, an Eve with a tattoo, and a Moses who promotes Coca-Cola alongside the Ten Commandments.
