= Jazz Raycole =

American actress, dancer

- Born: Jazzmine Raycole Dillingham; Stockton, California, U.S.
- Other name: Jazzmine Raycole
- Occupations: Actress, dancer
- Years active: 1995–present

Jazzmine Raycole Dillingham is an American actress and dancer. She is best known for her role as Claire Kyle on the ABC sitcom My Wife and Kids during its first season. She is credited as Jazzmine Raycole.

== Early life and education ==
Raycole was born in Stockton, California, the daughter of Ray, a water company superintendent, and Claudia Dillingham, who owned a dance studio and managed Raycole's career during her childhood. A trained dancer, Raycole first danced when she was a toddler. Raycole studied dance under both her mother and Barbara Faulkner, and was a competitive dancer by the age of four. She attended a program at the Boston Ballet in 2001, and also taught dance classes that year when she was 13 years old. Raycole was home schooled by her mother.

== Career ==
Raycole's acting career began in 1995, when she appeared in two films: voicing a puppy in Babe and as Onika Harris in Waiting to Exhale. One of her earliest roles on television was a guest spot on sitcom Ellen. She also was once featured as the voice of a one-time appearing character named Chloe on Nickelodeon's Hey Arnold! in 2003.

In 2001, Raycole appeared in the first dozen episodes of My Wife and Kids as Claire Kyle, with Damon Wayans portraying her father. However, she was subsequently replaced on the show by Jennifer Freeman when the second season began. It is reported that Raycole herself said "I was 12 years old when I got that job. The producers wanted a different thing, they wanted someone a little bit older. I wasn't ready for that," she said. "I ended up going to New York to dance, which was my first passion. I really thank God for that because I got to grow and travel."

She has made several guest appearances on television series, including Malcolm & Eddie, The Jamie Foxx Show, Smart Guy, Everybody Hates Chris, Monk and Crazy Ex-Girlfriend. Between 2007 and 2008, she portrayed Allison Hawkins in the post-apocalyptic drama Jericho. She replaced Geffri Maya Hightower, who played the role in the show's pilot episode. Raycole appeared regularly as Lyric Ballentine on the TV Land sitcom The Soul Man (2012−14). From 2017 to 2018, Raycole starred as college student Sydney Fletcher on the BET series The Quad. She also played the daughter of Stanley Hudson on the TV show The Office.

Raycole appeared as Mae, the girlfriend of Kimiko Glenn's character, in the television film Ghosting: The Spirit of Christmas (2019). She portrayed Sage, a pregnant woman who has Gerstmann-Straussler-Scheinker syndrome, in short-lived series Council of Dads. In 2020, Raycole was set to play in the lead role of Izzy, Mickey's client in the drama series The Lincoln Lawyer, which was based on the Michael Connelly novels and was written by David E. Kelley. The pilot was passed on by CBS due to a scheduling conflict, but in 2021, Raycole was one of the few actors who returned in her role when Netflix picked up the series, taking it to air in 2022.

== Filmography ==
=== Film ===
| Year | Title | Role | Notes |
|---|---|---|---|
| 1995 | Babe | Puppy | Voice |
| 1995 | Waiting to Exhale | Onika Harris | |

=== Television ===
| Year | Title | Role | Notes |
|---|---|---|---|
| 1997 | The Parent 'Hood | Sierra | Episode: "Nick the Player" |
| 1998 | From the Earth to the Moon | Lead Dancer | Miniseries |
| 1998 | Ellen | Angela | Episode: "Ellen: A Hollywood Tribute: Part 2" |
| 1998 | Smart Guy | Vanessa | Episode: "Henderson House Party" |
| 1998 | The Jamie Foxx Show | Kayla | Episode: "We Got No Game" |
| 1999 | Malcolm & Eddie | Geneva Jensen | Episode: "Daddio" |
| 2001–2002 | My Wife and Kids | Claire Kyle | Main cast (season 1); last appeared in season 2 |
| 2003 | Hey Arnold! | Chloe (voice) | Episode: "Ghost Bride/Gerald vs. Jamie O." |
| 2004 | Law & Order: Special Victims Unit | Megan | Episode: "Careless" |
| 2004 | Clubhouse | Vicky | Episode: "Pilot" |
| 2005–2007 | Everybody Hates Chris | Lisa / Prom Girl | 4 episodes |
| 2006 | Monk | Kimberly | Episode: "Mr. Monk and the Big Game" |
| 2006, 2007 | The Office | Melissa Hudson | 2 episodes |
| 2006–2008 | Jericho | Allison Hawkins | Recurring role |
| 2007 | Lincoln Heights | Sharon | Episode: "Flashpoint" |
| 2008 | Without a Trace | Kelli Peters | Episode: "A Bend in the Road" |
| 2009 | 10 Things I Hate About You | Belinda | Episode: "Don't Give a Damn About My Bad Reputation" |
| 2009 | Eastwick | Justine | 2 episodes |
| 2010 | First Day | Paige | Main cast (season 1) |
| 2011 | Brave New World | Hillary King | TV movie |
| 2012 | New Girl | Miriam | Episode: "Fancyman Part 2" |
| 2012 | The Secret Life of the American Teenager | Jane | Episode: "Allies" |
| 2012 | Perception | Vicky | Episode: "Kilimanjaro" |
| 2012–2014 | The Soul Man | Lyric Ballentine | Main cast (season 1), recurring role (seasons 2–3) |
| 2013 | Suburgatory | Amber | Episode: "Body Talk" |
| 2013 | Rizzoli & Isles | Ashley Harper | Episode: "Judge, Jury and Executioner" |
| 2013 | Bones | Jessica Miller | Episode: "The Fury in the Jury" |
| 2014 | A Lesson in Romance | Eve | TV movie |
| 2014, 2015 | Faking It | Jasmine / Online Date | 2 episodes |
| 2015 | Vanity | Zoe | Main cast |
| 2015 | iZombie | Bethany Miller | Episode: "Real Dead Housewife of Seattle" |
| 2016 | Crazy Ex-Girlfriend | Tanya | Episode: "I'm Back at Camp with Josh!" |
| 2017 | Sweet/Vicious | Danielle Fox | Episode: "Pure Heroine" |
| 2017–2018 | The Quad | Sydney Fletcher | Main cast |
| 2019 | I Ship It | Winnie | Recurring role (season 2) |
| 2019 | Ghosting: The Spirit of Christmas | Mae | TV movie |
| 2020 | Council of Dads | Sage | 3 episodes |
| 2022–present | The Lincoln Lawyer | Izzy Letts | Main cast |
