= Jonas L.A. (soundtrack) =

2010 soundtrack album by Jonas Brothers

Jonas L.A. (Music from the TV Series)

Soundtrack album by Jonas Brothers
- Released: July 20, 2010
- Recorded: September 2009 – May 2010
- Length: 43:54
- Label: Hollywood
- Producer: John Fields

Jonas Brothers chronology
Jonas Brothers Live: Walmart Soundcheck (2009)	Jonas L.A. (2010)	LiVe (2013)

Jonas L.A. (Music from the TV Series) is the third soundtrack album by the American pop rock band Jonas Brothers, released on July 20, 2010, through Hollywood Records.

The album was released in companion to the second season of their Disney Channel series Jonas L.A, to positive reviews from critics and debuted at number seven on the Billboard 200. It has sold 132,000 copies in the United States.

== Promotion ==
"L.A. Baby (Where Dreams Are Made Of)"
A sample of "L.A. Baby (Where Dreams Are Made Of)" by Jonas Brothers, serviced as the lead single from Jonas L.A..

"L.A. Baby (Where Dreams Are Made Of)" was released as promotional single on Radio Disney on May 7, reaching #1 on the Top 30 Countdown, becoming their only #1 hit from the album on that chart, and it was released as a digital download on iTunes on June 29.

== Critical reception ==
Professional ratings
Review scores
Source	Rating
AllMusic	4/5 stars
Entertainment Weekly	C

Jonas L.A. (Music from the TV Series) received mixed to positive reviews from critics. Entertainment Weekly gave the album a "C" grading, with Mikael Wood writing that the songs "are longer on mewling boy-band vocals than on John Mayer-ish guitar work" from Nick Jonas's previous record, Who I Am (2010), but that he felt that, aside from the song "L.A. Baby", they lack "killer choruses".

Stephen Thomas Erlewine of AllMusic praised the less mature sound of the record, in regards to the band's previous outings, as he felt "this switch is a welcome relief" and that the album has "a true sense of fun". He concluded by stating: "Perhaps they're playing by the rules more than they did on Lines, but that's a good thing: they're letting themselves act like kids, not adults, winding up with a clutch of lively, effervescent pop."

== Commercial performance ==
Jonas L.A. (Music from the TV Series) debuted at number seven on the Billboard 200. As of February 2015, it has sold 132,000 copies in the United States.

== Track listing ==
Jonas L.A. (Music from the TV Series) track listing
No.	Title	Writer(s)	Producer(s)	Length
1.	"Feelin' Alive"	Michael Busbee; J. T. Harding	John Fields	3:13
2.	"L.A. Baby (Where Dreams Are Made Of)"	Niclas Molinder; Joacim Persson; Johan Alkenäs; Drew Ryan Scott; Nicholas Jonas	Molinder; Persson	3:14
3.	"Your Biggest Fan" (featuring China Anne McClain)	PJ Bianco; Joseph Jonas; Kevin Jonas II; N. Jonas	Molinder; Persson	3:59
4.	"Critical"	Molinder; Persson; Alkenas; Geraldo Sandell	Bianco	3:35
5.	"Hey You"	Molinder; Persson; Alkenas; Scott	Molinder; Persson	2:49
6.	"Things Will Never Be the Same"	Molinder; Persson; Alkenas; Scott; John Taylor; N. Jonas	Molinder; Persson	3:43
7.	"Fall"	Adam Anders; Jess Cates; N. Jonas	Anders; Nolan Sipe; Ryan Petersen	3:23
8.	"Summer Rain"	Adam Watts; Andy Dodd	Dodd; Watts	4:13
9.	"Drive"	Matthew Gerrard; Robbie Nevil; N. Jonas	Gerrard	3:45
10.	"Invisible"	Anders; Zac Poor; N. Jonas	Anders; Sipe; Petersen	2:54
11.	"Make It Right"	Watts; Dodd; N. Jonas	Watts; Dodd	3:44
12.	"Chillin' in the Summertime"	Ben Burgess; Sean D. McCarthy; Joe Acosta	Dodd	3:26
13.	"Set This Party Off"	Mitch Allan; Kara DioGuardi; N. Jonas	Allan	2:56
Total length:				43:54

iTunes bonus track
No.	Title	Writer(s)	Producer(s)	Length
14.	"Critical" (Acoustic Version)	Molinder; Persson; Alkenas; Geraldo Sandell	Bianco	3:38
Total length:				47:38

Note

- The Enhanced CD has full-length music videos and lyrics, and a special version of the song "Critical" featuring China Anne McClain.

== Charts ==
=== Weekly charts ===
Weekly chart performance for Jonas L.A. (Music from the TV Series)
Chart (2010)	Peak position
Belgian Albums (Ultratop Flanders)	59
Canadian Albums (Billboard)	10
Dutch Albums (Album Top 100)	84
French Albums (SNEP)	99
Greek Albums (IFPI)	46
Italian Albums (FIMI)	32
Mexican Albums (Top 100 Mexico)	16
Spanish Albums (Promusicae)	51
US Billboard 200	7
US Kid Albums (Billboard)	2
US Soundtrack Albums (Billboard)	1

=== Year-end charts ===
Year-end chart performance for Jonas L.A. (Music from the TV Series)
Chart (2010)	Position
US Soundtrack Albums (Billboard)	21

== Release history ==
Date	Region
June 16, 2010	Netherlands
June 19, 2010	Poland
July 20, 2010	USA
August 9, 2010	United Kingdom
August 20, 2010	Australia
December 3, 2010	Germany
