= Phil of the Future =

American science fiction comedy television series (2004–2006)

- Genre: Music
- Created by: Douglas Tuber; Tim Maile
- Starring: Raviv Ullman; Amy Bruckner; Craig Anton; Lise Simms; Alyson Michalka
- Theme music composer: John Adair; Steve Hampton
- Opening theme: "Phil of the Future", performed by Drew Davis Band
- Ending theme: "Phil of the Future (instrumental)"
- Composers: Christopher Brady (Season 1); Kenneth Burgomaster (Season 2)
- Country of origin: United States
- Original language: English
- No. of seasons: 2
- No. of episodes: 43

Production
- Executive producers: Douglas Tuber; Tim Maile (both; entire run); Tom Burkhard; Matt Dearborn; Tim O'Donnell (all; Season 1); Michael Curtis; Roger S.H. Schulman (both; Season 2)
- Production locations: Occidental Studios; Los Angeles, California
- Camera setup: Film; Single-camera
- Running time: 22 minutes
- Production companies: 2121 Productions; Brookwell McNamara Entertainment

Original release
- Network: Disney Channel
- Release: June 18, 2004 – August 19, 2006

Phil of the Future is an American science fiction comedy television series that originally aired on Disney Channel for two seasons from June 18, 2004, to August 19, 2006. Created by Douglas Tuber and Tim Maile, the series was produced by 2121 Productions, a division of Brookwell McNamara Entertainment. The series follows a family from the year 2121 who become stranded in the present day when their rented time machine breaks down during a vacation. It was filmed in single-camera format at Occidental Studios in Los Angeles.

The series received nominations from the Directors Guild of America, the Writers Guild of America, and the Young Artist Awards during its run. It has been available to stream on Disney+ since the platform's launch on November 12, 2019.

== Premise ==
While on a time-travel vacation, teenager Phil Diffy and his family from the year 2121 crash land and become stranded in the fictional town of Pickford, California, in the present day when their rented time machine malfunctions. Phil's father Lloyd, an engineer, works to repair the machine while the family attempts to blend in as an ordinary suburban household. Phil and his younger sister Pim enroll at H.G. Wells Junior/Senior High School, where Phil befriends and later falls for his neighbor Keely Teslow, the only person outside the family to learn their secret. The family also harbors Curtis, a Cro-Magnon caveman who stowed away in the time machine during a visit to the Stone Age. Much of the show's humor derives from the family's reliance on futuristic gadgets—such as the "Wizard" (a multipurpose handheld device), the "Skyak" (a flying vehicle), and spray-can food—which frequently cause complications in their efforts to remain inconspicuous.

== Cast and characters ==
=== Main ===
- Ricky Ullman as Philip "Phil" Diffy, a teenager from the year 2121 who adjusts to life as a high school freshman (Season 1) and sophomore (Season 2) in the present day. He becomes best friends and eventually romantic partners with Keely.
- Amy Bruckner as Pimilla "Pim" Diffy, Phil's mischievous younger sister, a middle school student with a tendency toward scheming and megalomania.
- Craig Anton as Lloyd Diffy, the family patriarch and an engineer from 2121 who spends the series attempting to repair the time machine.
- Lise Simms as Barbara "Barb" Diffy, Phil and Pim's mother, who enthusiastically but awkwardly adapts to 21st-century domestic life.
- Alyson Michalka as Keely Teslow, Phil's next-door neighbor, best friend, and eventual girlfriend, an aspiring news reporter who is the only outsider to know the Diffys' secret.

=== Recurring ===
- J. P. Manoux as Curtis, a Cro-Magnon caveman who stowed away in the Diffys' time machine, and as Vice Principal Neil Hackett, the series' primary antagonist, who suspects the Diffys are hiding something.
- Kay Panabaker as Debbie Berwick (Season 1), Pim's relentlessly cheerful classmate who considers Pim her best friend.
- Brenda Song as Tia Fedichelli (Season 1), Keely's popular best friend, who departed when Song joined the cast of The Suite Life of Zack & Cody.
- Evan Peters as Seth Wosmer (Season 1), Phil and Keely's nerdy friend.
- Spencer Locke as Candida Scobel (Season 2), a popular girl who antagonizes Pim.
- Brandon Smith as Li'l Danny Dawkins (Season 2), a younger student with a persistent crush on Pim.
- Juliet Holland-Rose as Olivia "Via" (Season 2), an English transfer student who replaces Tia as Keely's close friend.
- Michael Mitchell as Owen (Season 2), Phil's laid-back friend who replaces Seth.
- Joel Brooks as Mr. Messerschmitt (Season 2), Phil and Keely's demanding teacher.

== Episodes ==
Season	Episodes	Originally released	
Season	Episodes	First released	Last released
1	21	June 18, 2004	October 28, 2005
2	22	June 25, 2005	August 19, 2006

=== Season 1 (2004–05) ===
No. overall	No. in season	Title	Directed by	Written by	Original release date	Prod. code
1	1	"Your Cheatin' Heart"	David Kendall	Douglas Tuber & Tim Maile	June 18, 2004	111
Phil discovers that Keely's crush, Tanner, is cheating on her. He uses a futuristic gadget to expose the deception, though Keely initially believes Phil is just trying to break them up. Meanwhile, Pim schemes to break up Debbie and Bradley.
2	2	"Unification Day"	Tim O'Donnell	Dan Fybel & Rich Rinaldi	June 18, 2004	110
Phil must choose between celebrating his family's futuristic holiday, Unification Day, and attending an 11th-grade party. Debbie helps Pim after her cooking assignment goes wrong.
3	3	"Meet the Curtis"	Neal Israel	Dan Fybel & Rich Rinaldi	June 18, 2004	105
The Diffys discover a caveman stowed away in their time machine. Lloyd wants to get rid of him, but Phil advocates for keeping "Curtis" after he saves Lloyd's life. Meanwhile, Pim tries to escape from a sleepover at Debbie's house.
4	4	"Phillin' In"	David Kendall	Ellen Guylas	June 18, 2004	113
Phil must watch Pim while their parents are away for the weekend to earn an upgrade for his skyak, but Pim attempts to sabotage everything.
5	5	"Tanner"	Tim O'Donnell	Rachelle Romberg	June 25, 2004	118
Phil is sent back to the second grade to improve his penmanship, where Tanner's younger brother secretly films his embarrassing moments. When the footage is aired at school, Tanner's own embarrassing secrets are revealed in turn.
6	6	"Raging Bull"	Tim O'Donnell	Douglas Tuber & Tim Maile	July 2, 2004	120
Phil uses his Wizard gadget to save a classmate, while Pim pretends Curtis is her father for a parent conference.
7	7	"My Way"	Savage Steve Holland	Story by : Tim Maile; Teleplay by : Rachelle Romberg	July 9, 2004	115
Phil shrinks himself to secretly help Keely overcome her stage fright during a school talent show, where she performs "Protecting Me."
8	8	"Daddy Dearest"	Tim O'Donnell	Adam Lapidus	July 23, 2004	114
Lloyd plans to play American folk music at Phil's school assembly, leading Phil and Pim to confront their embarrassment over their father. Curtis visits the dentist.
9	9	"Pheremonally Yours"	Tim O'Donnell	Danny Kallis	August 6, 2004	106
Phil draws the unwanted affections of a Southern girl named Marla. Meanwhile, Pim joins the school orchestra and tries to sabotage Debbie's solo.
10	10	"Future Tutor"	Neal Israel	Tim O'Donnell	August 13, 2004	101
In the series pilot, Phil and Pim enroll at their new school. Phil tutors Keely in algebra and learns to accept people outside her clique, while Pim runs against Debbie for chalk monitor. This episode aired as part of a three-episode event with "Future Jock" and "You Say Toe-Mato."
11	11	"Future Jock"	David Kendall	Adam Lapidus & Steve Luchsinger	August 13, 2004	102
Phil uses a futuristic gadget to join the gymnastics team and compete in a tournament to impress Keely, while Pim tries to get him in trouble.
12	12	"You Say Toe-Mato"	Tim O'Donnell	Douglas Tuber & Tim Maile	August 13, 2004	104
A class field trip to a tomato farm threatens to expose Phil's secret—the Diffy family has only four toes on each foot. When Keely discovers the truth, Phil decides to tell her that his family is from the future.
13	13	"Doggie Daycare"	Rich Correll	Dan Fybel & Rich Rinaldi	August 27, 2004	117
Phil and Keely run a dog-sitting business to earn money for a concert, bonding with a dog named Max (voiced by Rodney Dangerfield, in one of his final performances). Pim feigns an injury to make Debbie wait on her.
14	14	"We'll Fix It in Editing"	Brian Roberts	Douglas Tuber & Tim Maile	October 1, 2004	108
A school video project causes Phil to overlook his friends' feelings. Pim competes as a fast walker in a track meet.
15	15	"Halloween"	Fred Savage	Story by : Rachelle Romberg; Teleplay by : Michael Caine & Jason Cox	October 8, 2004	119
Debbie is revealed to be an evil cyborg who terrorizes Pickford, leaving Phil and Keely to save Halloween. The canonicity of the episode is ambiguous, as Debbie appears in later-produced episodes.
16	16	"Age Before Beauty"	Tim O'Donnell	Tom Burkhard & Matt Dearborn	November 12, 2004	112
Keely uses Phil's age-altering gadget to see herself at 25, but complications arise when Vice Principal Hackett asks her older self out. Phil and Keely help Hackett gain confidence with his ex-girlfriend.
17	17	"Neander-Phil"	Matt Dearborn	Tom Burkhard & Matt Dearborn	December 10, 2004	121
A malfunctioning gadget intermittently switches Phil's and Curtis' personalities. Phil tries to impress a girl while Pim takes a yoga class taught by Debbie.
18	18	"Double Trouble"	Joanna Kerns	Tom Burkhard & Matt Dearborn	January 1, 2005	109
Phil and Pim deal with school bullies. When Phil stands up for Pim, the bully's older brother confronts him. Curtis adopts the neighbor's lawn ornaments.
19	19	"Milkin' It"	Savage Steve Holland	Rachelle Romberg	March 25, 2005	107
Lloyd fears Phil's science project will expose the family's secret and decides they must move. Phil and Keely go undercover at the science fair to prevent this. Pim misuses her gadgets for a school writing assignment.
20	20	"Corner Pocket"	Savage Steve Holland	Tom Burkhard & Matt Dearborn	April 8, 2005	103
Keely lies to her mother Mandy (Yeardley Smith) about making the cheerleading squad, and Phil helps stage a fake event to maintain the deception. Pim discovers Debbie's one weakness: raisins.
21	21	"Team Diffy"	Tim O'Donnell	James Kramer	October 28, 2005 (Note: This episode was first included in the Gadgets & Gizmos DVD, released on August 16, 2005, prior to premiering on Disney Channel. Although this is a season one episode, Disney Channel premiered this episode once they had already begun airing season two episodes.)	116
Phil is blackmailed by Andy Baxley (Orlando Brown), a rival from 2121, who threatens to expose the Diffys unless Phil pulls a prank on the mayor.

=== Season 2 (2005–06) ===
No. overall	No. in season	Title	Directed by	Written by	Original release date	Prod. code
22	1	"Versa Day"	Matthew Diamond	Roger S. H. Schulman	June 25, 2005	202
Lloyd forces Phil and Pim to switch bodies after their bickering escalates. Meanwhile, Lloyd tries to get Curtis a job.
23	2	"Virtu-Date"	Fred Savage	Michael Curtis & Roger S. H. Schulman	June 26, 2005	201
A fun day with Keely in Phil's virtual reality mall turns complicated when Keely develops a crush on a robot.
24	3	"The Giggle"	David Kendall	Bill Canterbury	July 9, 2005	204
Keely accidentally alters her future after using a futuristic internet machine, and she and Phil must pass an impossible test to set things right. Pim sneaks into an R-rated movie and is terrified by it.
25	4	"Dinner Time"	Henry Chan	Julie Sherman Wolfe	July 24, 2005	203
Phil invites Vice Principal Hackett to dinner after he moves in next door, hoping to defuse his suspicions about the family. Appearing "normal" proves more difficult than expected.
26	5	"Tia, Via, or Me... Uh"	David Kendall	Ivan Menchell	August 5, 2005	206
After Tia moves away, Keely enlists Phil for stereotypically feminine activities. Phil introduces Keely to a new student, Via, to free himself, but grows jealous when Keely begins spending more time with Via than with him.
27	6	"Get Ready to Go-Go"	Jace Alexander	Sharon A. Wong & Masha Tivyan	August 5, 2005	207
Phil and Keely plan to attend the school dance together, but Lloyd announces he has fixed the time machine and the family is leaving on the day of the dance.
28	7	"Phil Without a Future"	Savage Steve Holland	Sharon A. Wong & Masha Tivyan	August 21, 2005	208
During career week at school, Phil struggles to find a career that suits him. Pim decides to pursue a career as a corrections officer.
29	8	"Time Release Capsule"	Fred Savage	Michael Curtis	August 27, 2005	210
The school buries a time capsule that Lloyd and Barbara will find in 2121. Lloyd asks Phil to place a warning note inside, but doing so would erase Phil and Keely's memories of each other.
30	9	"Mummy's Boy"	Fred Savage	Dan Fybel & Rich Rinaldi	September 9, 2005	205
Phil finds a time machine component at a museum. Keely and Owen sneak into the museum basement to film material for a school project.
31	10	"Maybe-Sitting"	Fred Savage	Ivan Menchell	September 23, 2005	211
Phil and Keely babysit Mr. Messerschmitt's trouble-making nephew Nathan (Josh Flitter). When they use a futuristic behavior-changing device, it backfires, leaving Nathan acting elderly and Phil acting like a child.
32	11	"Good Phil Hunting"	Andrew Tsao	Peter Tibbals & Eric Goldberg	September 30, 2005	214
Phil solves one of Hackett's difficult math problems, but Keely accidentally gets the credit and is promoted to the advanced math class.
33	12	"Pim-Cipal"	David Kendall	Douglas Tuber & Tim Maile	October 21, 2005	217
Pim abuses her power when she becomes school principal for a day, and Phil must intervene to restore order.
34	13	"Phil of the Garage"	Roger S. H. Schulman	Roger S. H. Schulman	November 11, 2005	220
Frustrated by his family's invasion of privacy, Phil moves into the garage with Curtis, but finds independent living harder than anticipated.
35	14	"It's a Wonder-Phil Life"	Douglas Tuber	Ivan Menchell	November 27, 2005	218
Phil has a It's a Wonderful Life-style vision of what would happen if he revealed his family's secret to the world, showing that his newfound fame would destroy his friendship with Keely. Meanwhile, Pim enters a weightlifting competition.
36	15	"Christmas Break"	Fred Savage	Julie Sherman Wolfe	December 2, 2005	213
In a flashback episode, Phil and Lloyd recall the family's early days in Pickford, including Phil's first meeting with Keely.
37	16	"Stuck in the Meddle With You"	Fred Savage	Ivan Menchell	January 6, 2006	215
Keely tries to set up two classmates, Grace (Ashley Drane) and Grady (Jason Earles), but Grace develops a crush on Phil instead, leading to an awkward double date.
38	17	"Broadcast Blues"	Fred Savage	David Steven Cohen	March 24, 2006	219
Keely's school news show struggles for viewers until Pim convinces her to focus on fashion, transforming Keely into a trendsetter but compromising her journalistic ambitions.
39	18	"Happy Nird-day"	Christopher Erskin	Wayne Stamps	March 31, 2006	209
Phil gives Keely a skyak ride for her birthday, but Lloyd has drained all the family's gadget batteries. Pim meets a scheming student who matches her deviousness.
40	19	"Ill of the Future"	Henry Chan	Bill Canterbury	June 24, 2006	212
The Diffys contract a futuristic disease called "greenmia" that turns them green and causes them to behave opposite to their normal personalities.
41	20	"Where's the Wizard?"	J. P. Manoux	Michelle Wendt & Kimberly Joy Kessler	July 7, 2006	216
Phil, Keely, and Pim lose the Wizard gadget, which ends up in Vice Principal Hackett's hands.
42	21	"Not-So-Great Great Great Grandpa"	Fred Savage	Ivan Menchell	August 11, 2006	221
Phil discovers that a classmate is his great-great-grandfather on Barbara's side. When Phil accidentally disrupts the timeline, he, Pim, and Barbara begin to fade from existence.
43	22	"Back to the Future (Not the Movie)"	Michael Curtis	Michael Curtis & Roger S. H. Schulman	August 19, 2006	222
After being voted "Cutest Couple," Phil and Keely finally become a couple, only for Lloyd to reveal the time machine is repaired. It emerges that Lloyd had been intentionally delaying repairs because the family was happy in the present. Phil returns briefly to say goodbye to Keely, sharing a kiss broadcast on the school's television system. The series ends with the Diffys heading back to the present to retrieve Curtis, whom they accidentally left behind.

== Production ==
=== Development ===
Creators Douglas Tuber and Tim Maile, who had previously worked as writers on Lizzie McGuire, developed the series under the working title The Out-of-Timers, inspired by the Elvis Costello song "Man Out of Time." Tuber conceived the time-travel premise while browsing a record store that sold Costello's album, thinking, "What about if it's a kid out of time?" The year 2121 was settled on as the family's home era after a Disney Channel executive felt that the creators' initial idea of setting it in the year 2525—a reference to Zager and Evans' 1969 song "In the Year 2525"—was too far in the future.

The series was produced by 2121 Productions, a division of Brookwell McNamara Entertainment, the company behind other Disney Channel series including Even Stevens and That's So Raven. Tuber and Maile served as executive producers throughout the series' run, with additional executive producers including Tom Burkhard, Matt Dearborn, and Tim O'Donnell in Season 1, and Michael Curtis and Roger S.H. Schulman in Season 2.

=== Filming and format ===
The series was filmed at Occidental Studios in Los Angeles, California, using a single-camera setup without a laugh track. This distinguished it from the multi-camera, audience-filmed format that Disney Channel increasingly adopted through its partnership with It's a Laugh Productions during the same period, as seen in contemporaries like The Suite Life of Zack & Cody and Hannah Montana.

=== Casting and character changes ===
Lead actor Raviv Ullman, who was credited as "Ricky Ullman" during the series, was a high school student in Fairfield, Connecticut, when he was cast. He booked the role and filmed the Disney Channel Original Movie Pixel Perfect before beginning production on the first season. Aly Michalka, credited as "Alyson Michalka," was 13 at the start of filming and later formed the musical duo Aly & AJ with her sister Amanda.

Several character changes occurred between seasons. The character of Barbara Diffy was originally conceived as having a detachable head and artificial body. Creator Tim Maile explained that "in the pilot, mom had an artificial body. So her head was real," and actress Lise Simms wore chokers and turtlenecks throughout the first season to conceal where the head was supposed to detach. In a 2019 interview, Ullman recalled that scenes were filmed with the concept but it did not work as intended: "I think we had shot the entire first season that way... Then for the second season, we actually had to end up going back and reshooting a bunch of things." Between seasons, Brenda Song departed to star in The Suite Life of Zack & Cody, and her character Tia was replaced by Via (Juliet Holland-Rose). Similarly, Evan Peters' character Seth was replaced by Owen (Michael Mitchell), and Kay Panabaker's character Debbie was written out after Season 1.

=== Theme song ===
The theme song, also titled "Phil of the Future," was written and composed by John Adair and Steve Hampton, and performed by Loren Ellis with the Drew Davis Band, who also performed the theme song of The Suite Life of Zack & Cody.

== Reception ==
Phil of the Future aired for a total of 43 episodes across two seasons on Disney Channel from June 2004 to August 2006.

Critical reception was mixed. Common Sense Media gave the series a rating of 2 out of 5 stars, describing it as "harmless but unpleasant" and criticizing the "hackneyed situations and endless cheesy sound effects," while noting that Pim's antagonistic behavior was "so nasty, rude, and antagonistic that it makes the show nearly unwatchable." On Rotten Tomatoes, the series has limited critical coverage, with only one professional review aggregated for its first season.

== Awards and nominations ==
Year	Award	Category	Nominee	Result
2005	Young Artist Awards	Best Performance in a TV Series (Comedy or Drama): Leading Young Actress	Alyson Michalka	Nominated
2005	Young Artist Awards	Best Performance in a Television Series: Recurring Young Actor	Rory Thost	Nominated
2005	Young Artist Awards	Best Performance in a Television Series: Recurring Young Actress	Kay Panabaker	Nominated
2006	Young Artist Awards	Best Performance in a TV Series (Comedy or Drama): Leading Young Actress	Amy Bruckner	Nominated
2007	Directors Guild of America	Outstanding Directorial Achievement in Children's Programs	Fred Savage (for "Not-So-Great Great Great Grandpa")	Nominated
2007	Writers Guild of America	Children's Episodic & Specials	David Steven Cohen (for "Broadcast Blues")	Nominated

== Related media ==
=== Home video ===
A DVD of the series titled Gadgets & Gizmos was released on August 16, 2005, containing four episodes: "Double Trouble," "Age Before Beauty," "My Way," and the then-unaired "Team Diffy." The episode "Christmas Break" was released as a bonus feature on the Disney Channel Holiday DVD compilation on November 1, 2005. The complete series became available to stream on Disney+ in the United States when the platform launched on November 12, 2019.

=== Video game ===
A video game based on the series was released for the Game Boy Advance on August 22, 2006, in which players help Phil stop Pim's clones of a futuristic pet called "Blahs."

=== Books ===
Disney Publishing released a series of tie-in books throughout the 2000s, each adapting two episodes into novelized form. Titles include Stuck in Time, The Great Fake-out, Blast from the Past, and Far-out Phil.
