= Abby Walker =

American actress (active 2007–2016)

- Occupations: Actress, model
- Years active: 2007–2016

Abby Walker (credited as Abby Pivaronas through to 2013) is an American actress and model. She played Vanessa Page on Disney Channel sitcom Jonas.

== Life and career ==
Walker's other television credits include Gossip Girl, Lincoln Heights, Monk, The Glades and Privileged. She also appeared in the films Mostly Ghostly and the TV film Cheerleader Camp opposite Kristin Cavallari. Walker also appeared in the Funny or Die video Zac Efron's Pool Party.

== Filmography ==
Film
Year	Title	Role	Notes
2008	Mostly Ghostly	Rebecca	Direct-to-video
2008	Hutton Was a Butterfly	Wife	Short film
2014	Rabid weight Loss	Candice	Short film, first film credit as Abby Walker
2015	Hollywood Adventures	Kelly Ashley	

Television
Year	Title	Role	Notes
2008	Cheerleader Camp	Marla	TV movie
2008	Monk	Tiffany Preston	Episode: "Mr. Monk Goes to the Bank"
2008	Privileged	Emily	Episode: "All About Appearances"
2008	Lincoln Heights	Ashley Childress	Episode: "The Price You Pay"
2009	Gossip Girl	Veronica	Episode: "Valley Girls"
2010	Jonas	Vanessa Page	Recurring role
2010	The Glades	Erin Williams	Pilot episode
2012	Cassandra French's Finishing School for Boys	Lexi	Unsold pilot
2012	Two and a Half Men	Lady #2	Episode: "Why We Gave Up Women"
2012	CSI: NY	Melanie Rogers	Episode: "Late Admissions"
2013	The Flip Side	N/A	Episodes: "Sexy" & "Clubbing"
2013	Down Dog	Aja	Unsold pilot
2015–2016	Grandfathered	Cindy	Recurring role, first TV credit as Abby Walker
