= The Soul Man =

American sitcom (2012–2016)

- Genre: Sitcom
- Created by: Cedric the Entertainer; Suzanne Martin
- Starring: Cedric the Entertainer; Niecy Nash; Wesley Jonathan; Jazz Raycole; John Beasley
- Country of origin: United States
- Original language: English
- No. of seasons: 5
- No. of episodes: 54 (list of episodes)

Production
- Executive producers: Cedric the Entertainer; Eric Rhone; Keith Cox; Larry W. Jones; Sean Hayes; Suzanne Martin; Todd Milliner; Lynda Obst
- Camera setup: Multiple
- Running time: 22 minutes
- Production companies: A Bird and a Bear Entertainment; Hazy Mills Productions; SamJen Productions; TV Land Original Productions

Original release
- Network: TV Land
- Release: June 20, 2012 – June 22, 2016

Related
- Hot in Cleveland

The Soul Man is an American sitcom created by Suzanne Martin and Cedric the Entertainer. The series is a spin-off from Hot in Cleveland, in which Cedric guest starred in the 2011 episode "Bridezelka", the backdoor pilot for The Soul Man. The series premiered on TV Land on June 20, 2012, with a 12-episode order.

On December 13, 2012, TV Land picked up The Soul Man for a second season of 10 episodes with Yvette Lee Bowser replacing Phoef Sutton as showrunner. The second season premiered on June 19, 2013. On December 4, 2013, The Soul Man was renewed for a third season that consisted of eight episodes. Season 3 premiered on March 26, 2014 with a special live episode. On August 4, 2014, TV Land renewed The Soul Man for a 12-episode fourth season. The fourth season debuted on March 18, 2015 with the series' second live episode. On July 28, 2015, The Soul Man was renewed for a 12-episode fifth and final season, which premiered on March 30, 2016 at 10:30 PM ET/PT. The series aired its final episode on June 22, 2016.

== Synopsis ==
The series follows R&B superstar-turned-minister Reverend Boyce "The Voice" Ballantine (Cedric the Entertainer), who was living the high life in Las Vegas at the top of the music charts when he got "the calling" and decided to relocate to St. Louis with his family to become a preacher in his father's church. However, his family members — including wife Lolli (Niecy Nash), daughter Lyric (Jazz Raycole) and younger brother Stamps (Wesley Jonathan) — are not exactly eager to give up the fabulous superstar life for their new humble one.

== Cast and characters ==
=== Main cast ===
- Cedric the Entertainer as Reverend Sherman Boyce Ballentine, a former R&B singer turned minister. "Boyce" was the maiden name of Cedric's real-life mother.
- Niecy Nash as Lolli Ballentine, Boyce's wife, a beauty salon owner
- Wesley Jonathan as Fletcher Emmanuel "Stamps" Ballentine, Boyce's carefree younger brother. He was Boyce's tour manager in the music business, but now struggles to find employment.
- Jazz Raycole as Lyric Ballentine (main cast season 1, recurring seasons 2–3), Boyce's daughter, who is adjusting to her father's new lifestyle
- John Beasley as Barton Moses Ballentine (main cast season 1, recurring seasons 2–5), Boyce's and Stamps' father, a retired minister who now serves on the church Board of Elders, often to Boyce's annoyance

=== Recurring cast ===
- Gary Anthony Williams as Lester, member of the Ballentines' church who serves the church in various capacities, including choir director
- Hattie Winston as Sister Coriann Pearly (seasons 1–4), member of the Ballentines' church
- Kim Coles as Wanda (season 1), member of the Ballentines' church
- Cedric Yarbrough and Yvette Nicole Brown as Paul and Robyn (seasons 1–3, 5), the Ballentines' bickering former neighbors from Las Vegas
- Kellee Stewart as Kim (seasons 1–4), Lolli's younger sister who is an anesthesiologist; she later becomes Stamps' girlfriend
- Malcolm Barrett as Bird (season 2), co-owner (with Boyce) of Bird's, a bar & grill that the Ballentines frequent
- Malik S as Curtis (seasons 2–5), Stamps' friend who has spent time in prison
- Sherri Shepherd as Nikki (seasons 1 & 4), Boyce's irritating cousin from Chicago, who later becomes the new church treasurer
- Nyima Funk as Terri (season 4), a church member and Lolli's friend
- Aloma Wright as Shirley (seasons 4–5), a church member who serves as the church secretary
- Missi Pyle as Alicia (season 5), Boyce's campaign manager in his run for Mayor of St. Louis

== Episodes ==
| Season | Episodes | Originally released | |
| Season | Episodes | First released | Last released |
|---|---|---|---|
| 1 | 12 | June 20, 2012 | September 5, 2012 |
| 2 | 10 | June 19, 2013 | August 28, 2013 |
| 3 | 8 | March 26, 2014 | May 14, 2014 |
| 4 | 12 | March 18, 2015 | May 27, 2015 |
| 5 | 12 | March 30, 2016 | June 22, 2016 |

== Syndication ==
The Soul Man aired on NickMom from August 17 to September 27, 2015, and aired on BET Her between 2016 and 2018.

== Home media ==
Shout! Factory (under license from Paramount) released the complete first season on DVD in Region 1 on July 8, 2014. Season 2 was released on October 21, 2014.

== Development and production ==
On April 18, 2011, it was announced that Cedric the Entertainer would guest star in a season 2 episode of Hot in Cleveland, as a minister that gets caught up in the girls' problems. The episode served as a backdoor pilot for a spin-off series to star Cedric. The episode entitled "Bridezelka" was written by Hot in Cleveland creator Suzanne Martin and aired on August 24, 2011.

In November 2011, it was that announced that Niecy Nash was cast the female lead opposite Cedric. The two had previously worked together in the 2007 film Code Name: The Cleaner. John Beasley, Wesley Jonathan, and Jazz Raycole, were then cast, with Beasley playing Boyce's father; Jonathan playing Boyce's brother; and Raycole playing Boyce's daughter. Suzanne Martin and Cedric wrote the pilot and are executive producing with Sean Hayes and Todd Milliner. The pilot was filmed on December 2, 2011.

On January 12, 2012, TV Land officially picked up the pilot to series, under the title Have Faith, and set the first season at 12 episodes. On March 11, 2012 it was announced that the series' title was changed from Have Faith to The Soul Man.

For the first season, former Cheers writer/producer Phoef Sutton was hired as the showrunner. Stan Lathan, who previously directed Cedric in every episode of The Steve Harvey Show, served as the director of the first season. Anthony Anderson, Tamar Braxton, Trina Braxton, Robert Forster, Cee Lo Green, Tim Reid and Sherri Shepherd all guest starred during the show's first season.

== Reception ==
The series has received generally positive reviews from critics, with an initial score 65 out of 100 on Metacritic.
