= Roger S. H. Schulman =

American screenwriter and film producer

Roger S. H. Schulman is an American screenwriter and film producer. He co-wrote the animated feature Shrek, for which he won the British Academy Award for Best Adapted Screenplay and was nominated for an Oscar for Best Writing (Adapted Screenplay).

== Education ==
A native of Brooklyn, NY, he graduated from Brooklyn College with a degree in English. MS Journalism, Columbia University Graduate School of Journalism.

== Career ==
He co-wrote the animated feature Balto for executive producer Steven Spielberg, and wrote Mulan II and The Jungle Book 2 for Walt Disney Pictures. He developed and wrote the screenplay for an animated feature about the true story of a tortoise who befriends a baby hippo after the 2004 tsunami. The film has not yet been made. He also had written an unproduced version of Jungle Cruise, a screenplay for Disney, inspired by the theme park attraction, slated to star Tom Hanks and Tim Allen.

Schulman has also worked extensively as a producer and writer for television. He was co-creator and executive producer of the series Jonas for the Disney Channel, for which he was nominated for an Emmy award. He was also executive producer of Phil of the Future on Disney Channel. He developed and was executive producer of 2gether for MTV; he was executive producer for Living Single with Queen Latifah, for which he won an NAACP Image Award; he also wrote on Parker Lewis Can't Lose and ALF. In addition, he served as co-writer of the original pilot for The Wayans Bros. television series, as well as the pilots The Mother Load, Fresh Man and Just My Luck.

== Screenwriting credits ==
- series head writer denoted in bold

=== Television ===
- George Burns Comedy Week (1985)
- Fast Times (1986)
- The Ellen Burstyn Show (1987)
- Mr. President (1987)
- ALF Tales (1988)
- ALF (1989)
- Pee-Wee’s Playhouse (1990)
- Tiny Toon Adventures (1990)
- Parker Lewis Can’t Lose (1991–1993)
- Living Single (1993-1996)
- For Your Love (1998)
- Big Guy and Rusty the Boy Robot (1999, 2001)
- The War Next Door (2000)
- **2gether: The Series** (2000–2001)
- Teacher’s Pet (2002)
- Phil of the Future (2005–2006)
- Jonas (2009–2010) (also co-creator)
- The Soul Man (2013–2014)
- Melissa & Joey (2014–2015)
- Bizaardvark (2016–2017)

=== Films ===
- Balto (1995)
- Shrek (2001)
- The Jungle Book 2 (2003)
- Mulan II (2004)
- Bambi II (2006)
- The Fox and the Hound 2 (2006)
