= List of Bizaardvark episodes =

Bizaardvark is an American comedy television series created by Kyle Stegina and Josh Lehrman that premiered on Disney Channel on June 24, 2016. The series ran for three seasons consisting of 63 episodes, airing its final episode on April 13, 2019. The series stars Madison Hu, Olivia Rodrigo, Jake Paul, DeVore Ledridge, Ethan Wacker, Maxwell Simkins, and Elie Samouhi. In addition to the series' regular episodes, the series has also aired shorts under the title of Bizaardvark Shorts.

== Series overview ==
Season	Episodes	Originally released	
Season	Episodes	First released	Last released
1	20	June 24, 2016	January 27, 2017
2	22	June 23, 2017	April 13, 2018
3	21	July 24, 2018	April 13, 2019

== Episodes ==
=== Season 1 (2016–17) ===
No. overall	No. in season	Title	Directed by	Written by	Original release date	Prod. code	U.S. viewers (millions)
1	1	"First!"	David Kendall	Kyle Stegina & Josh Lehrman	June 24, 2016	101	2.41
Best friends Paige and Frankie, who have an online channel titled Bizaardvark, hit 10,000 subscribers and get accepted into the Vuuugle studios, a place for other Internet stars. Their friend, Bernie, tags along and tries to convince the girls to let him represent them. The girls meet Dirk, from DareMeBro, a series in which he takes dare requests. Dirk asks the girls if they want some of his cake. Frankie smashes the cake, thinking it is a cake smash dare, but Dirk tells them it was a birthday cake. The girls leave and meet Amelia, from Perfect Perfection with Amelia, a series about fashion. Amelia is stressed because her video will not upload to the Internet. Paige tells her she knows a trick to fix it, and in the process of doing such, she deletes Amelia's video. This leads the whole room to shun the girls. Later, the girls meet Liam, the son of the creator of Vuuugle, who asks them about their channel. Frankie and Paige say the channel was named by thinking of random words and combining them: "bizarre" and "aardvark". They also tell him about their video idea for the upcoming VidView party, and he tells them he does not get it, leading Paige and Frankie to believe they are too weird. They try to change their video, but they get stuck thinking everything they do is too weird. Upset, the girls leave the studio, deciding to quit with Bizaardvark. When Bernie reminds them of their fans, they remember why they make their videos and they resume their original video idea, "The Comeback Song". They show their video at the VidView party and receive praise from Dirk and Amelia who have forgiven them for what happened. The girls decide to let Bernie be their manager. Guest stars: Johnathan McClain as Liam, Joshua Carlon as Theo, Jimmy Fowlie as Angelo, Sean Lew as Robbie Song featured: "Comeback Song"
2	2	"Draw My Life"	David Kendall	Michael Curtis & Roger S.H. Schulman	July 10, 2016	102	1.19
Frankie and Paige are chosen to do a "Draw My Life", in which they create an animated story of their lives. When the girls realize they have nothing interesting to write about, they take up various new hobbies to create compelling stories. Dirk is dared to leap over a pond of snapping turtles, but declines due to a childhood fear of the animals. Bernie makes various attempts to help Dirk overcome his fear. Guest star: Jimmy Fowlie as Angelo
3	3	"Frankie Has a Hater"	Savage Steve Holland	Eric Friedman	July 17, 2016	105	1.07
Frankie becomes obsessed with locating the person who wrote a negative online comment about her, claiming that she is not funny. Paige tries unsuccessfully to convince Frankie not to worry about the comment. When Amelia discovers that she has been criticized for not being a good role model, she goes undercover at Paige and Frankie's school to learn about science so she can improve her image. Amelia discovers that the girls in the science club all watch her online series, and becomes convinced that she already is a good role model. After interrogating a classmate named Leon, Paige and Frankie discover that the negative comment came from a little girl who was merely complaining on the Internet using her older brother's laptop without any intention of insulting Frankie. Guest stars: Deborah Baker Jr. as Marge the Barista, Veronica McFarlane as Celeste, Jimmy Fowlie as Angelo, Joe Matthews as Leon, Zachary Conneen as Jeff Casoli, Tessa Espinola as Eva Song featured: "Love for the Haters"
4	4	"Superfan"	David Kendall	Heather Flanders	July 24, 2016	103	1.41
Bernie arranges for Paige and Frankie to perform songs live at a club on two consecutive nights. Paige and Frankie meet an obsessive fan of theirs named Belissa, who becomes an annoyance and eventually disrupts their performance. Bernie convinces the manager not to cancel the girls' second night at the club. Bernie wants to impress his critical grandmother and receives advice from Dirk. At the club, Bernie pretends that Amelia is his girlfriend to impress his grandmother. Amelia learns of Bernie's plan and agrees to go along with it. On the second night at the club, Bernie ends the fake relationship after being forced by Amelia to dress in tight clothing. Bernie's grandmother informs him that she knew the relationship was fake the entire time, but that she is proud of him. Guest stars: Maya Jade Frank as Belissa, Ellen Ratner as Grandma, Jimmy Fowlie as Angelo, Philip AJ Smithey as Booker
5	5	"The Collab"	Savage Steve Holland	Kyle Stegina & Josh Lehrman	July 31, 2016	106	1.04
According to Liam, those who have a million subscribers like JiffPom can get more studio time at Vuuugle. In order to raise their subscribers for Bizaardvark, Paige and Frankie plan to collaborate with the other Vuuuglers. They end up working with Victor of "Prank Town" because nobody else wanted to collaborate with the "newbies." What Paige and Frankie don't know is that Victor was secretly known for ruining the other Internet stars that used to work for Vuuugle. Eventually, Paige and Frankie teach Victor a lesson and threaten to expose him for who he really is by posting the truth online. While the girls realize that doing so would make them as bad as Victor, Bernie reveals that he was live streaming and Victor reveals that his remorse was fake and ends up getting more subscribers. Meanwhile, Dirk and Amelia do their video collaboration but struggle due to their differing views. Guest stars: Calum Worthy as Victor, Johnathan McClain as Liam, Nick Galarza as Teddy, Sanai Victoria as Girl, Mark Bloom as Guy Special appearance by: JiffPom
6	6	"Unboxing"	David Kendall	Tim Brenner	August 7, 2016	104	1.74
Frankie, Paige, Amelia, and Bernie discover that Dirk has been moonlighting as the unseen Princess Unboxer at Vuuugle. When in the truth circle, Paige admits that she takes mixed martial arts as part of her alone time as Frankie tries to join her in it. While learning of Amelia having made a lot of money, Dirk and Bernie try to impress her through various things. In the end, the circle of truth leads to Paige and Frankie getting into a fight but reconciling later with Paige earning her greenbelt and Frankie accepting that Paige needs her own time, Amelia ends up losing a thousand dollars due to Dirk and Bernie purchasing lunch on her account, and Bernie gets community service courtesy due to trying to cash in a fake check Amelia gave him and Dirk to teach him a lesson. Guest stars: Kevin A. Makely as Sensei, Albert Malafronte as Mayor Rollercoaster
7	7	"The First Law of Dirk"	David Kendall	Kyle Stegina & Josh Lehrman	August 14, 2016	108	1.53
Following Dirk's latest dare, Paige gets worried about his safety and finds that he is good at physics where she brings him to Ms. Tyson's physics class. This leads Dirk to work on perfecting his dares even when his brother Kirk shows up. Meanwhile, Frankie and Bernie try to get Liam to give Bernie an official office much different from the makeshift one that involves also having to keep Vuuugle's servers from overheating so that Bernie can meet with a TV network owner. Guest stars: Logan Paul as Kirk, Johnathan McClain as Liam, Devika Parikh as Ms. Tyson, Jonathan Runyon as TV Guy/Earl Squirrelson Absent: DeVore Ledridge as Amelia Duckworth
8	8	"Best Friend Tag"	Savage Steve Holland	Tracy Bitterolf & Miranda Russo	September 11, 2016	107	1.21
Paige and Frankie are suspicious about Amelia having an actual best friend named Becky who she claims travels the world. So Paige and Frankie invite Amelia over for a sleepover where Amelia's antics annoy Paige and Frankie. Meanwhile, a dare involving a bowling ball return causes Dirk and Bernie to accidentally destroy the robotic monitor that Liam speaks through as they work to dispose of it before someone finds out that they "killed" Liam. Guest stars: Johnathan McClain as Liam, Bryana Salaz as Becky, Jeremy Briggs as Rug Doug
9	9	"Bernie's in Charge"	David Kendall	Eric Friedman	September 18, 2016	109	1.04
Liam suspends Paige and Frankie from Vuuugle's studio for two weeks when he finds out that they plan to have pyrotechnics in their latest video. Bernie convinces Liam to take a vacation and leave him in charge. While Liam is away, Bernie actually listens to the other Vuuugler's issues which Liam never deals with. Meanwhile, Amelia enlists Marge to help her with Gliiink, a one second video app. Guest stars: Johnathan McClain as Liam, Deborah Baker Jr. as Marge the Barista, Danny Woodburn as Pyro Steve Absent: Jake Paul as Dirk Mann
10	10	"Pretty Con"	David Kendall	Michael Curtis & Roger S.H. Schulman	September 25, 2016	110	1.20
The beauty convention Pretty Con has come to Vuuugle and is being hosted by Meredith Foster. Due to Angelo resigning in order to finish med school and work in doctor-less countries, Paige and Frankie work with Amelia in exchange for showing the latest Bizaardvark video if she wins. Amelia ends up in a competition with a nine-year-old beauty guru named Didi. Meanwhile, Bernie goes through the initiations in order to attend Dirk's Dude Con. Guest stars: Meredith Foster as herself, Mckenna Grace as Didi, Cleo Berry as Sweaty Phil, David Light as Judge, Gregory Ballora as Puppeteer Song featured: "Bad Hair Day"
11	11	"Puff & Frankie"	Jon Rosenbaum	Tim Brenner	October 2, 2016	112	1.28
Bernie is still trying to get some other Vuuuglers to let him be his agent with no success. At the suggestion of Paige and Frankie, Bernie starts to meet with different Internet animal stars until he manages to land some cats and does some cat-themed videos mixed with some Bizaardvark songs which lands him on a spot for Britt Pickle's upcoming series at Vuuugle. Meanwhile, Belissa returns where she is interning at Vuuugle as Amelia tries to get Belissa to subscribe to Amelia's page. Guest stars: Maya Jade Frank as Belissa, Shakira Barrera as Britt Pickles Special appearance by: Grumpy Cat Absent: Jake Paul as Dirk Mann
12	12	"Halloweenvark"	David Kendall	Eric Friedman	October 7, 2016	116	1.92
Liam is asking Paige, Frankie, Dirk, Amelia, and Bernie for a Halloween video idea to post on Bizaardvark's main page. Paige and Frankie's story takes place at Hollander Prep where they are haunted by the ghost of Hollander Prep's founder. Dirk's story deals with a dystopian future where dares are outlawed. Amelia's story deals with a new shampoo turning everyone into zombie-like Ameliacs. After the stories are pitched, Liam ends up going with the Halloween video that Horse Face Guy just posted of him in a skeleton costume. Later, Bernie tells his story after being disappointed with dying in each one. While claiming in the story that he is invincible, he is zapped by Liam in the story. Guest star: Johnathan McClain as Liam
13	13	"Spoiler Alert: Belissa Returns"	Linda Mendoza	Heather Flanders	October 23, 2016	111	0.86
When Paige and Frankie have a hard time trying to write a song for Bizaardvark, Frankie accidentally wishes for bad things to happen to them. Still interning at Vuuugle, Belissa overhears this and "helps" them out where she steals Paige's phone, drops water on Paige's electric guitar and on Frankie's keyboard, tries to drop a studio light on Frankie, and later frames the girls for breaking inside the mayor's house. Meanwhile, Dirk and Amelia try to find Dirk's lucky bandage after it went missing when Amelia did an ambush reorganizing in Dirk's area. Guest stars: Maya Jade Frank as Belissa, Devika Parikh as Ms. Tyson, Dan Oster as Reporter/Cop Absent: Ethan Wacker as Bernie Schotz
14	14	"Bizaardvark vs. Vicki 'Hot Head' Fuego"	Robbie Countryman	Tracy Bitterolf & Miranda Russo	November 6, 2016	114	1.29
Inspired by Amelia's fake feud with JoJo Siwa and the feud between Horse Face Guy and Bagpipe Ninja, Paige and Frankie start a fake feud with Internet MMA fighter Vicki "Hot Head" Fuego which soon starts to turn into an actual feud within the ring that results in them asking Paige's sensei to help them train for the fight. Meanwhile, Bernie works for Amelia when he is unable to pay back the $500.00 she loaned to him and tries to make money from the upcoming live feuds at Vuuugle. Guest stars: JoJo Siwa as herself, Kevin Makely as Sensei, Ciara Wilson as Vicki "Hot Head" Fuego Absent: Jake Paul as Dirk Mann
15	15	"Moosetashio: A Cautionary Tale"	Sean Mulcahy	Kyle Stegina & Josh Lehrman	November 13, 2016	115	1.17
Paige and Frankie create the character named Moosetashio, where it becomes popular with the children and the child stars at Vuuugle Jr. Meanwhile, Dirk stays over at Bernie's house, but his antics annoy Bernie's grandmother. Guest stars: Ellen Ratner as Grandma, O'Neill Monahan as Milo, Katya Lidsky as Mommy Blogger Absent: DeVore Ledridge as Amelia Duckworth
16	16	"Control (Plus) Alt (Plus) Escape!"	Jon Rosenbaum	Eric Friedman	November 27, 2016	121	0.97
A rich fan named Hugh invites Paige and Frankie to his mansion as guests under cover of paying for their next project so that he can trap them and Amelia in order to help him become an Internet star. While trapped, they also meet Eva Gutowski who states that Hugh never lets his Internet star guests go. Guest stars: Eva Gutowski as herself, Annalisa Cochrane as Dare-Me-Girl, Elijah Nelson as Hugh Song featured: "The Party Don't Drop"
17	17	"Agh, Humbug"	Jon Rosenbaum	Vincent Brown	December 11, 2016	120	0.91
Vuuugle is having a Christmas party; unfortunately, Liam won't allow Bernie to attend since he is not a Vuuugler. After a plan for Paige and Frankie to have Rosanna Pansino sneak Bernie in a cake fails, Liam suggests that Bernie gets 10,000 subscribers of his own in order to join. Meanwhile, Dirk is having a hard time trying to figure out what to get Horse Face Guy for Christmas. Guest stars: Rosanna Pansino as herself, Johnathan McClain as Liam, Ellen Ratner as Grandma, Jackie Flynn as Chief Pulaski, Nicholas Oteri as Kid, JR Reed as Middle-Aged Man Role Song featured: "Kid at the Adult Table"
18	18	"Mom! Stop!"	Robbie Countryman	Matthew Roman	January 13, 2017	113	0.95
Paige's mother Gina invites Paige and Frankie to work for them at her restaurant where they can balance between singing their songs and waiting tables. This proves to be difficult for Paige when her mother tells embarrassing facts about her. Meanwhile, Dirk gets trapped in an avalanche of props as he struggles to get out. Guest stars: Tessie Santiago as Gina Olvera, Rebecca Bloom as Katie, Casey Campbell as Punching Bag Man Absent: DeVore Ledridge as Amelia Duckworth, Ethan Wacker as Bernie Schotz Song featured: "My Mom Writes Notes in My Lunch Bag"
19	19	"Paige's Birthday Is Gonna Be Great"	Jody Margolin Hahn	Michael Curtis & Roger S.H. Schulman	January 20, 2017	117	1.16
Paige is displeased that she didn't win a day off from school for her upcoming birthday party. In order to remedy this, Frankie enlists the Vuuuglers to help put together the best birthday party for Paige. As Amelia struggles to make a sideways cake, Frankie enlists her to help convince Lilly Singh to attend Paige's birthday party. Meanwhile, Dirk and Bernie are assigned to obtain ice for the party. Guest stars: Lilly Singh as herself, Devika Parikh as Ms. Tyson, Joshua Carlon as Theo
20	20	"In Your Space!"	Leslie Kolins Small	Tim Brenner	January 27, 2017	119	0.99
The latest season of the web-based reality show "In Your Space!" hosted by Ian Finkelman is going to be filmed at Vuuugle. Paige and Frankie end up in a competition against Dirk, Bagpipe Ninja, Sore Loser Guy, Horse Face Guy, Victor, and Teddy. The competition is fierce until Paige and Frankie are left. They are unaware that Victor and Teddy are the ones behind the show and planned to use it to break the duo apart. Frankie eventually catches on to their plan and manages informs Paige at the last minute. Everyone ends up losing but Paige and Frankie score a personal victory in exposing Victor and Teddy despite Victor selling an idea based off their fight to a TV production company. Meanwhile, Amelia watches "In Your Space!" from the house of Bernie's grandmother since she won't have access to the showers if she competed and due to the fact that the Wi-Fi at her house is down. Bernie takes this opportunity to impress Amelia in front of his grandmother. Guest stars: Calum Worthy as Victor, Ellen Ratner as Grandma, Nick Galarza as Teddy, Thomas Sanders as Ian, Steve Zaragoza as Sore Loser Guy, Ryan Rich as Man

=== Season 2 (2017–18) ===
No. overall	No. in season	Title	Directed by	Written by	Original release date	Prod. code	U.S. viewers (millions)
21	1	"First Day of School"	Bob Koherr	Kyle Stegina & Josh Lehrman	June 23, 2017	201	1.49
Paige, Frankie, Bernie, and Amelia begin their first day at Sierra High School. Paige and Frankie are disappointed when they learn that they will not have any classes together, but they decide to make the best of the situation and try to work through it. While Paige enjoys the new school and immediately makes several new friends, Frankie believes that she does not fit in after having a bad first day, as she has difficulty making new friends and keeps getting her hair caught in her locker. Paige cheers Frankie up and convinces her that it will take time before she fits in and makes new friends. Frankie becomes happy when several students recognize her and Paige from Bizaardvark. Meanwhile, Amelia realizes that her teacher and none of her classmates like her except for Bernie, who cheers her up. Dirk returns to the high school to perform a dare in which he uses rocket-powered leaf blowers to propel him through a wall. In the post-credits, Paige cuts Frankie's hair as they do their latest video about their first day of school. Guest stars: Rachna Khatau as Principal Karen, David Theune as Mr. Hattleberg, Isabella Revel as Claire, Tyler Cornell as Daniel, David Hadinger as Janitor, Zack Michael as Kid at Table, Sofie Dossi as herself
22	2	"Chocolate Bananas"	Jody Margolin Hahn	Tim Brenner	June 30, 2017	203	0.83
Paige and Frankie film a video for Bizaardvark in which they are dressed as chocolate bananas while singing a song. When they begin editing the video, they realize that their costumes actually resemble feces and decide not to publish the video. The next day, graffiti is discovered on some of Sierra High School's lockers. Paige and Frankie realize that they caught the suspect in the background on their video, but they are hesitant to show the embarrassing tape to Principal Karen. More graffiti appears the next day, and Amelia becomes the suspect after a security guard spotted her leaving school the night before. After Amelia receives detention, Paige and Frankie plan to secretly create new graffiti during a school event that she will be attending, in order to demonstrate that she is not the vandal. However, Paige and Frankie are caught with spray paint and are brought into Principal Karen's office. The real culprit Simon Vandalman is caught by Security Guard Clark before Paige and Frankie hand over their video to Karen, but the footage is taken anyway as possible evidence, leading to the video being aired on a news program. Meanwhile, Bernie considers Dirk to be his best friend and says so to him, but he is upset when Dirk does not repeat it back. Guest stars: Rachna Khatau as Principal Karen, Isabella Revel as Claire, Ross Ryman as Security Guard Clark, Garrett Westton as Bondo, Cady Walls as herself
23	3	"The Doctor Will See You Now"	Bob Koherr	Jessica Kaminsky	July 7, 2017	202	1.39
Dr. Wong, Frankie's father who works as a medical doctor, takes two weeks off from work so he can spend more time with her. Frankie neglects an upcoming test and term paper so she can spend time with her father, who began working more often after divorcing her mother so he could afford to provide Frankie with whatever she wanted. When Frankie becomes stressed out about not getting her homework finished on time, she tells her father, who decides to work less often from now on so they can spend more time together. Meanwhile, when Dirk becomes tired of Vuuugle's hot chocolate bar, a group of Vuuuglers unite with him to have it torn out for something better. The group rejects Amelia's idea to replace the hot chocolate bar with a beverage bar that would offer a variety of drinks. Dirk is unable to think of a concept worthy of replacing the hot chocolate bar, which he then unsuccessfully tries to put back together. Liam then has the space converted into a first-floor office for himself so that Viking Guy no longer has to carry his mobile monitor up the stairs, while Dirk and the other Vuuuglers set up a dart board outside the new office for their enjoyment. Guest stars: Tom Choi as Dr. Wong, Johnathan McClain as Liam, Adam Haas Hunter as Viking Guy, Zabeth Russell as Nurse Colleen, Kate Sullivan as Lemonade Stand Girl #1, Jayden Long as Lemonade Stand Girl #2 Song featured: "Lemonade"
24	4	"Paige Bugs Out"	David Kendall	Eric Friedman	July 14, 2017	205	1.16
Paige goes on a date with a boy she likes named Reese, who requests that she not make him the subject of any Bizaardvark videos; Paige assures him that she does not plan to do so, but Frankie encourages her to keep the possibility open. During a date, Reese reveals to Paige that he has a caterpillar named Roger, which inspires her and Frankie with numerous video ideas. Frankie convinces Paige to proceed with the videos and end the relationship with Reese. When Frankie realizes how much Reese likes Paige, she tells her to get back together with him. When Paige reveals to Reese her idea for a Bizaardvark video about his caterpillar, he approves of it and later appears in the video. Meanwhile, Bernie joins the school wrestling team and obtains a wrestling jacket, which gains him attention from girls, including an invitation from Amelia to a party she is having. Bernie is initially the only child in his weight class, but when Coach Carlson discovers that Bernie has gained weight, he is put in a wrestling match against a boy known as The Brick. After Bernie loses the match, his jacket is revoked and he is disinvited to the party. In the post-credits, Paige and Reese do their video with Frankie portraying Reese's caterpillar. Guest stars: Austin Kane as Reese Maynard, Kevin Will as Coach Carlson, Americus Abesamis as Sumo Wrestler
25	5	"Friend Fight!"	David Kendall	Ron Rappaport	July 28, 2017	204	1.47
Paige and Frankie are given a Vuuugle studio after Bizaardvark reaches 100,000 subscribers. However, they disagree on how to decorate the new studio. Frankie wants Paige and herself to decorate the studio, while Paige wants to let their fans decide how to decorate it. Their disagreement escalates when Frankie accuses Paige of being insecure and worrying about what other people think of her. Frankie, who is not insecure, later tells Paige that she has tried not to care about what other people think after her mother left the family. Paige and Frankie rekindle their friendship and decorate the studio themselves. Meanwhile, Amelia agrees to dance in a school fundraising event so she can become friends with the event's organizer, Rachel. However, Amelia does not know how to dance, so Bernie offers to teach her. Bernie also does not know how to dance, but learns from his grandmother by dancing with her. During practice, Bernie realizes that his grandmother only taught him how to perform dance moves meant for the role of a female dance partner, such as the dip. Instead, Amelia and Bernie decide to perform their own dance moves, but their performance is poorly received. In the post-credits, Paige and Frankie give the viewers a tour of their studio. Guest stars: Tom Choi as Dr. Wong, Ellen Ratner as Grandma, Johnathan McClain as Liam, Alexa Sutherland as Rachel Massey Absent: Jake Paul as Dirk Mann
26	6	"Hawkward"	Adam Weissman	Kyle Stegina & Josh Lehrman	August 4, 2017	118	1.01
Paige is upset to see that Sierra High School's mascot, an owl named Hawk, is confined to a cage. Paige secretly brings the owl to Frankie's house so she can eventually set it free, but then the girls learn that the animal will not be able to survive in the wild because it has no survival skills. Principal Karen locates the owl, and Paige confesses to taking it. Principal Karen tells them that Hawk is only put in a cage during school events, and that it otherwise lives at a 100-acre nature sanctuary. As punishment for their actions, the girls are required to take Principal Karen's six-hour owl safety seminar, pay a fine, and perform community service. Meanwhile, Dirk has agreed to watch his friend's eight-year-old brother Patrick who enjoys destroying things. Amelia and her friend, Alisha Marie, have created a shower chandelier which is meant to hang above a shower and dispense soap and shampoo. Patrick convinces Dirk and Bernie that he is actually an undercover CIA agent who has been tasked with destroying the shower chandelier because it poses a national security risk. Patrick eventually succeeds in destroying the shower chandelier much to the dismay of Amelia and Alisha. Guest stars: Alisha Marie as herself, Rachna Khatau as Principal Karen, Caleb Brown as Patrick Song featured: "The Worst Lullaby Ever"
27	7	"Frankie and Amelia's Fun Friend Weekend"	Sean Mulcahy	Alex Fox & Rachel Lewis	August 11, 2017	206	1.11
Bernie's grandmother decides to take Paige and Dirk camping so Bernie can demonstrate the skills he learned from a camp school. However, Bernie secretly tells Dirk that he did not attend camp school, choosing instead to play a dancing arcade game at Vuuugle during each day that the camp was held. Bernie pretends to have camping skills, but eventually tells his grandmother the truth. Meanwhile, Frankie and Amelia decline to go on the trip as they do not like camping. Frankie and Amelia decide to become closer friends, and learn that they both share an interest in winning a hot-wing-eating contest at a restaurant. However, after winning the contest, they struggle to think of any other interests that they share. When a raccoon enters Frankie's house, the two girls wind up camping outside to stay away from the animal. Guest stars: Ellen Ratner as Grandma, Galen Howard as Wolftooth, E.J. Callahan as Wing Time Willy, Charles Dougherty as Seamus, Alexander Dominguez as Shoe Salesman Song featured: "Flying Shoes"
28	8	"Frankie's Cheating Teacher"	David Kendall	Kyle Stegina & Josh Lehrman	August 18, 2017	207	1.10
When Frankie's father, Douglas, decides to start dating, she and Paige take him to a school meeting, hoping that he will meet a single woman there. The girls are surprised when Douglas takes an interest in their teacher, Ms. Dana Bates. The two begin dating, which discomforts Frankie, as she begins having delusions that the cool children at school are mocking her because of her father's new relationship. Frankie and Paige look through Dana's office, hoping to find something that will make Douglas want to end the relationship. The girls then overhear Dana during a phone conversation and believe that she is cheating on Douglas with a man named Max. Paige and Frankie confront Dana at a restaurant, where they learn that Max is actually her son. Frankie later approves of the relationship when she sees how happy Douglas and Dana are. Meanwhile, Dirk's back is hurting after two months of sleeping on the floor at Bernie's house, so the two decide to buy a bunk bed designed to look like a yacht. However, they lack the money needed to purchase the bed, and their request for a bank loan is rejected. Out of anger, Dirk punches a hole in the wall at the DareMeBro studio, and Bernie notices money inside the wall. Dirk explains that he uses the money as insulation. When Bernie attempts to punch a hole into the wall to retrieve more money, he breaks all the bones in his arm and the money is spent on medical treatment for him. Guest stars: Tom Choi as Dr. Wong, Jessica Makinson as Ms. Bates, Taylor Gregory as Max, David Fickas as Banker Absent: DeVore Ledridge as Amelia Duckworth
29	9	"Softball: The Musical"	Robbie Countryman	Eric Friedman	August 25, 2017	208	1.09
Paige and Frankie have Dirk join the Vuuugle softball team, but they are disappointed to discover that he does not play well. To avoid hurting Dirk's feelings, Paige and Frankie tell him that the upcoming softball game was cancelled. However, Dirk sees the team return to Vuuugle from the game while they are still wearing their softball uniforms. The team devises a cover story by telling Dirk that they were rehearsing for a Vuuugle musical titled Softball: The Musical. Dirk intends to see the show, forcing the softball team to put a real musical together, but he later announces that he now has plans to attend a wedding on the day of the show. Viking Guy, an unintelligent member of the softball team, tells Dirk that the musical can be rescheduled so Dirk can attend, thus forcing the team to continue with the show. Amelia invites her subscribers to see the musical. After the musical concludes, Viking Guy tells Dirk that it was only put on to avoid telling him the truth about his lack of softball skills. Paige and Frankie apologize to Dirk, and promise to be truthful from there on. Guest star: Adam Haas Hunter as Viking Guy
30	10	"Yes and No"	Robbie Countryman	Ron Rappaport	September 15, 2017	209	1.21
Paige and Frankie have a disagreement about what their next video should be, with Frankie saying no to each suggestion that Paige makes. Paige points this out to Frankie, who notes that Paige usually says yes to things. They make a bet in which Paige can only say no when asked questions, while Frankie can only say yes. The winner gets to choose how to spend their collection of arcade tickets. Paige realizes how relaxing her life can be when she says no to people, as she has more time for herself. Bernie introduces Gaby, a young girl, to Paige. Bernie says Gaby has traveled from Fiji to hear Paige sing, but Paige rejects her request as part of the bet. Paige then learns that Gaby was hired by Frankie in an attempt to make Paige lose the bet. Paige meets an unsanitary student named Marlene, who is in search of a school mentor. Paige tells Marlene to ask Frankie to be her mentor, and Frankie reluctantly accepts the request to avoid losing the bet. When Frankie tells Paige how tired she is of Marlene, Paige offers to spend some time with Marlene to give Frankie a break from her. Paige loses the bet when says yes during their conversation. Frankie had intended to get a fighting robot with the tickets, but she does not have enough tickets and instead settles for thousands of spider rings. Meanwhile, Amelia learns that her Vuuugle channel could gain new subscribers by posting outtakes of herself. However, she has never made a mistake during her videos, so Dirk and Bernie help her. Guest stars: Alexa Sutherland as Rachel Massey, Lori Mae Hernandez as Marlene, Alessandra Marino as Gaby, Molly Erdman as Teacher Song featured: "Anything Can Be a Dance"
31	11	"Science (Un)Fair"	Sean Mulcahy	Jessica Kaminsky	September 22, 2017	210	1.03
Frankie babysits her neighbor, a girl named Savannah, who is working on a science fair project about crickets. After learning that one of Savannah's classmates is getting help from his parents on his science fair project, Paige and Frankie are reminded of an earlier science project that they worked on, which lost to a boy whose project also received help from his parents. Paige and Frankie decide to help Savannah with her project, to avoid a repeat of what happened to them. Paige and Frankie have a Vuuugle science channel build a functioning satellite as Savannah's project, which they believe will easily win the contest. At the science fair, Savannah tells Paige and Frankie that she does not care about winning. Instead, Savannah presents her cricket project with help from Paige and Frankie, who portray the roles of cricket puppets. Meanwhile, Bernie is told by Liam that he must do a presentation for Bizaardvark so it can remain a Vuuugle channel. However, Bernie is occupied with thoughts of his presentation, and inadvertently ignores Liam's instructions on how it should be done. Bernie later gives his presentation and hopes for it to be adequate. Liam, busy fantasizing about quitting his job, inadvertently ignores the presentation but allows Bizaardvark to remain at Vuuugle. Guest stars: Johnathan McClain as Liam, Adam Haas Hunter as Viking Guy, Jordyn Curet as Savannah, Sarah Yarkin as Science Girl, Shemika Charles as herself Absent: Jake Paul as Dirk Mann, DeVore Ledridge as Amelia Duckworth
32	12	"Promposal Problems"	A. Laura James	Tim Brenner	September 29, 2017	211	1.08
Paige and Frankie help their fellow students to ask people out for prom by putting together elaborate prom proposals known as promposals. Paige and Frankie have successfully helped nine children get dates for the prom, but they are worried about disrupting their winning streak when Bernie asks them if they can get him a date with Kate, a tall tennis player who is an honor roll student and the president of her class. Paige and Frankie do not believe Kate would want to go to prom with Bernie, so they have Amelia ask him instead to spare him of public rejection. After Bernie learns the truth, Paige and Frankie decide to proceed with a promposal for Kate. Bernie eventually gets a date with Kate on his own, but because of his clumsiness, he inadvertently disrupts the prom and hurts Kate. Meanwhile, Dirk tries to avoid hearing spoilers about the season finale of a television series until he can watch it with his brother. However, Amelia and Viking Guy repeatedly discuss the finale while Dirk is around. After Dirk watches the finale, he learns that Amelia and Viking Guy are no longer interested in discussing it as they have begun watching a new television series. Guest stars: Adam Haas Hunter as Viking Guy, Elizabeth Sawatzky as Kate
33	13	"Halloweenvark: Part Boo!"	Jon Rosenbaum	Kyle Stegina & Josh Lehrman	October 6, 2017	213	1.07
Paige, Frankie, and their friends decide to tell Halloween stories after the power goes out at Vuuugle. In Paige and Frankie's story, Bernie visits a store that is operated by a witch who resembles Amelia. As a present for Paige and Frankie, Bernie purchases cursed dolls that resemble the girls. The dolls come to life and create their own Vuuugle web show, with plans to become more popular than Bizaardvark. Paige and Frankie destroy the dolls and eat them, not realizing that consuming them will turn the girls into dolls. In Dirk's story, he is dared to spend Halloween night at his Vuuugle studio. Dirk and Bernie visit the witch's store to buy him a coffin to sleep in. The morning after the dare, Dirk awakens as a vampire and later convinces Amelia, Bernie and Viking Guy to let him turn them into vampires. In Bernie's story, he purchases a cursed cologne from the witch and is transformed into a werewolf at school, where he becomes popular among the students. Paige, Frankie, Amelia and Dirk express disappointment with Bernie's story, leading him to expand it with further details that he adds in as the story progresses. Guest stars: Adam Haas Hunter as Viking Guy, Maya Jade Frank as Belissa Song featured: "The Night Dream"
34	14	"A Killer Robot Christmas"	Robbie Countryman	Amy-Jo Perry	December 8, 2017	220	1.23
Paige and Frankie invite several children to a Christmas party at Vuuugle, but Liam declares that the holiday has been cancelled after he started reading A Christmas Carol. Amelia, who has taken some computer coding lessons, reprograms Liam's robot so he cannot see that the children are continuing with their Christmas party. Amelia also gives the robot arms and a Santa Claus personality. Bernie accidentally disrupts Amelia's computer code, giving the robot an evil Santa personality who attacks the children and locks them inside the building. Frankie, Paige, and the children flee to the Bizaardvark studio. Frankie later returns to the main lobby to retrieve a key that opens an exit in their studio. Frankie, who does not enjoy Christmas, encounters the robot again and discovers that he only hurts people who like Christmas. Frankie lures the robot away from the studio and the children by pretending to like Christmas. Meanwhile, Bernie and Amelia have taken refuge in his office, where they send out a message for help. Liam arrives at Vuuugle in person and destroys the robot. Later, Paige, Frankie, Amelia, and Bernie celebrate Christmas by opening gifts from Horse Face Guy. Guest stars: Ariel Martin as Tiffany, Johnathan McClain as Liam, Reece Joy Caddell as Ramona Absent: Jake Paul as Dirk Mann
35	15	"Clash of the Superfans"	Jody Margolin Hahn	Alex Fox & Rachel Lewis	February 23, 2018	212	1.10
Principal Karen has developed an obsession with Bizaardvark and becomes a nuisance to Paige and Frankie, who visit Belissa for advice on what to do. The girls learn that Belissa was sent to a military school after she kidnapped them. Belissa advises the girls to tell Karen that her obsession with Bizaardvark is not helping them. After following Belissa's advice, Paige and Frankie then learn that she has escaped her military school and is searching for Karen. Believing that Belissa is jealous of Karen and wants to harm her, the girls hide Karen in the Bizaardvark studio. However, Belissa finds them and reveals that she only wanted to meet Karen because they are both super fans of Bizaardvark. Karen and Belissa then become friends. Meanwhile, Dirk and Bernie play a board game with Amelia and are upset that she keeps beating them. Guest stars: Rachna Khatau as Principal Karen, Maya Jade Frank as Belissa, Aaron Hendry as Sergeant Brenner
36	16	"Don't Think, Just Dare"	Erika Kaestle	Vincent Brown	March 2, 2018	214	1.00
Paige has become tired of Reese's boring behavior lately and decides to end their relationship, but she is not brave enough to do so. At Paige's request, Dirk helps her overcome her fear through various methods. As Paige is about to end the relationship, Reese tells her that they should break up and just be friends. Reese also reveals that he intentionally acted boring in the hope that she would be the one to end the relationship rather than him. Meanwhile, Frankie, Amelia and Bernie enroll in a dinosaur history class at school in hopes of easily earning A's to make up for their poor grades in Coach Carlson's gym class. However, their teacher, Mr. Trifone, has a calm voice that makes them fall asleep whenever they hear it, a problem that he has encountered at previous schools. Trifone eventually quits his teaching job to work for a sleep therapy company, where he will record his voice to help people fall asleep. Guest stars: Austin Kane as Reese Maynard, Kevin Will as Coach Carlson, Alex Alcheh as Mr. Trifone
37	17	"Bernie Moves Out"	A. Laura James	Eric Friedman	March 9, 2018	215	1.02
Bernie is tired of his grandmother's strict rules and her treating him like a baby, and Frankie is disappointed that he would rather talk to Paige about his issues. Frankie, wanting to show that she can be a good friend, convinces Bernie to talk to her, and she convinces him to stand up to his grandmother and her rules. Bernie eventually decides to move into Frankie's house, becoming a nuisance to her. To get rid of Bernie without hurting his feelings, Frankie pretends to have romantic feelings for him, hoping to make him feel uncomfortable enough to leave. However, Bernie realizes Frankie's plan and tells her she is a bad friend before moving into Dirk's Vuuugle studio. Frankie and Dirk learn that Bernie and his grandmother miss each other and help them get back together. Meanwhile, Paige is excited to audition for a co-starring role in singer Jessie Grant's new music video, but she is passed up instead for Amelia, who does not want to be in the video. Paige convinces Amelia to appear in the video and insists to Jessie that they appear as a duo. However, during the video shoot, Paige ends her involvement with the project after learning that the song and video are about Jessie's dislike for sea otters. Guest stars: Tom Choi as Dr. Wong, Ellen Ratner as Grandma, Belle Adams as Jessie Grant
38	18	"The BFF (Before Frankie Friend)"	David Kendall	Ron Rappaport	March 16, 2018	216	0.95
Paige is excited when her childhood friend Izzy comes to visit for a week. Although Paige had wanted Frankie and Izzy to become friends, she becomes jealous when they wind up spending time together without her, especially when they go to a horror film festival rather than join her for a three-person sundae dessert. Paige becomes further upset when Frankie and Izzy make a video together without her. Paige reveals her feelings to Frankie and they have an argument before they ultimately reconcile. Meanwhile, Bernie's grandmother pranks him into thinking he has inherited $1 million from his great uncle. Believing that he is now rich and better than everyone else, Bernie criticizes students at school and people at Vuuugle, including Amelia, Horse Face Guy, and Viking Guy. After Bernie's grandmother reveals the prank, he convinces people from Vuuugle to pull a revenge prank on her by scaring her one night when she returns home. However, because it is dark, she beats up everyone without realizing who they are. Guest stars: Jenna Ortega as Izzy, Ellen Ratner as Grandma, Adam Haas Hunter as Viking Guy Absent: Jake Paul as Dirk Mann Song featured: "If I Had a Dog"
39	19	"Amelia's Perfectly Imperfect Volleyball Adventure"	Jon Rosenbaum	Jessica Kaminsky	March 23, 2018	217	1.00
Amelia is initially excited to try out for the Sierra High School volleyball team until she learns she may have to work hard to be accepted by Coach Carlson. Paige trains Amelia and motivates her to try her best rather than give up. Later, Paige learns that Carlson has rejected Amelia, and that he is also at risk of being fired. Paige arranges a deal with him to save his job in exchange for him letting Amelia onto the team. Amelia, still inspired by Paige, challenges the state volleyball champion team to a match. Sierra High School's volleyball team loses to the champion team, and Paige reveals to Amelia that she was not actually accepted by Carlson. Amelia says she is glad that Paige pushed her to try hard. Meanwhile, Frankie discovers that Bernie had written a graphic novel, and she is surprised to find how good it is. However, she is disappointed to learn that Bernie never wrote the ending, so she makes him write it. Guest stars: Kevin Will as Coach Carlson, Clement von Franckenstein as Martin R.R. George Absent: Jake Paul as Dirk Mann
40	20	"Paige Is Wrong"	Jon Rosenbaum	Tim Brenner	March 30, 2018	218	0.99
Frankie is certain of her suspicions that a new girl at school named Jade is a bad person, so Paige sets out to prove her wrong. Paige and Frankie introduce themselves to Jade, who turns out to be nice and invites them to her house. However, Paige and Frankie are unaware that Jade is actually a burglar planning to rob the house where she claims to live. Jade tells Paige and Frankie that she forgot her key, so they enter the house through a window while the real residents are away. Jade then tells the girls that they must pack up expensive items in the house to be donated. Jade eventually reveals that she is a burglar and then flees the house with the stolen items as the real residents return. Frankie and Paige are arrested for the burglary but are soon released after Jade is captured. Meanwhile, Paige's visiting cousin, Tessa, is a big fan of Bernie. Tessa is hired by Bernie as his assistant, and she convinces him to expand his current business, Bernie Schotz Entertainment, which represents Vuuugle stars. Together, they form Bernie Schotz Enterprises, focusing on sports, concerts, and fashion. Guest stars: Hello Kylie as Tessa, Savannah May as Jade, Larry Bates as Homeowner, Cate Cohen as Investor Absent: Jake Paul as Dirk Mann, DeVore Ledridge as Amelia Duckworth
41	21	"Spring Break Video Spectacular"	Robbie Countryman	Matt Roman	April 6, 2018	221	1.14
To celebrate spring break, Paige and Frankie create various videos and sketches with their friends, including television advertisements for their fictional law firm. In addition, they also create a game show hosted by Bernie's grandmother, who questions contestants on what Bernie is and is not allowed to do. Paige and Frankie also create a video with their friend, Annie LeBlanc, in which they make ice cream sandwiches using random foods as cookies to hold the ice cream. Paige, Frankie, Amelia and Bernie then appear in a music video about Coach Carlson taking them on a field trip, which is actually a series of errands he has to complete with their help. In another sketch, Frankie portrays an evil clock who continually delays the beginning of spring break for a classroom because she is upset that the students always leave at the end of each school day, so the classroom's teacher takes the clock with her on her Hawaiian spring break vacation to cheer her up. Next, Paige and Frankie create and practice several dance moves with their friend, Jordyn Jones. Later, Paige, Frankie, Amelia and Bernie play telephone with their friends, Johnny and Lauren Orlando. In another sketch, Amelia is the judge of her own courtroom, followed by a music video by Paige and Frankie about winning participation awards. Guest stars: Ellen Ratner as Grandma, Adam Haas Hunter as Viking Guy, Kevin Will as Coach Carlson, Annie LeBlanc as herself, Jordyn Jones as herself, Johnny Orlando as himself, Lauren Orlando as herself Absent: Jake Paul as Dirk Mann Song featured: "Field Trip"
42	22	"Her, Me, and Hermie"	Bob Koherr	Alex Fox & Rachel Lewis	April 13, 2018	219	0.97
Paige agrees to take care of Horse Face Guy's hermit crab, Hermie, while he goes out of town. Convinced that something is wrong with Hermie, Paige takes him to a veterinarian named Yvette who has a Vuuugle animal channel. Yvette discovers and removes a splinter from Hermie. Paige, who has an interest in animals, decides she may want to become a veterinarian some day, and she eventually volunteers for Yvette's channel. Frankie becomes concerned about the future of Bizaardvark and her friendship with Paige, as Paige has become too busy with Yvette's channel to spend time with Frankie. To discourage Paige from becoming a veterinarian, Frankie hides Hermie and tells Paige that he has escaped, which convinces Paige that she could not be a good veterinarian. When Paige becomes too sad about Hermie's disappearance to make Bizaardvark videos, Frankie reveals the truth and Paige forgives her. Meanwhile, Amelia is excited to do morning school announcements on television because it will increase the attention she receives at school, but she is disappointed when she is paired up with Bernie as a co-anchor. Guest stars: Peter Oldring as Mr. Cunningham, Sara Guarnieri as Yvette Absent: Jake Paul as Dirk Mann

=== Season 3 (2018–19) ===
No. overall	No. in season	Title	Directed by	Written by	Original release date	Prod. code	U.S. viewers (millions)
43	1	"The Summer of Us"	Jon Rosenbaum	Eric Friedman	July 24, 2018	301	0.76
Frankie, Paige and Amelia are accepted into the Vuuugle House, a mansion located on Malibu Beach where Vuuuglers live and create Vuuugle videos during the summer. Frankie and Paige meet Zane and Rodney, noisy 10-year-old boys who have their own Vuuugle shows. Frankie and Paige become annoyed by the boys and plot to frame them so they will be removed from the house, but their scheme is overheard by Liam through a television monitor. Liam is disappointed that Frankie and Paige were not role models for Zane and Rodney, so he evicts the girls from the house. Later, Paige and Frankie learn that Zane and Rodney are big Bizaardvark fans and they forgive the girls for their plot. Liam is then convinced to let Frankie and Paige back into the house. Bernie also now lives at the Vuuugle House, but only because his grandmother was hired as one of the adult chaperones. Bernie wants to fit in at the house with the other Vuuuglers, who were chosen because of their talents, so he decides to create a vlog in which he films the Vuuuglers during the summer. Guest stars: Ellen Ratner as Grandma, Johnathan McClain as Liam
44	2	"Two Me's in a Pod"	Jon Rosenbaum	Ron Rappaport	July 26, 2018	302	0.74
Amelia's younger sister Sarah visits the Vuuugle House to appear on Perfect Perfection, but Amelia is surprised at how different Sarah has become since they last saw each other, as her interests have changed and she now goes by the name Willow. On Perfect Perfection, Willow becomes upset when Amelia tries to give her a makeover. Willow later reveals that she is tired of always being compared to Amelia, as it makes her feel imperfect. Amelia accepts Willow for who she is now, and changes her channel to Imperfect Imperfection to focus on people's unique characteristics. Meanwhile, the Vuuuglers are divided on whether to purchase an air hockey table or a pinball machine in light of Grandma Schotz and Horse Face Guy accidentally breaking the ping pong table, and Bernie is left as the deciding vote. Paige and Zane want an air hockey table, while Frankie and Rodney want a pinball machine; both groups try to influence Bernie's decision. Later, Rodney overhears Zane saying that he has wanted an air hockey table since he was five years old. When Bernie is ready to announce his decision, Rodney and Frankie change their votes to an air hockey table for Zane. Guest stars: Ellen Ratner as Grandma, Caitlin Reagan as Willow
45	3	"House Moms"	Jon Rosenbaum	Jessica Kaminsky	July 31, 2018	303	0.53
Paige and Frankie are upset when they learn that Zane and Rodney view them as the mother figures of the Vuuugle House. To prove they are cool, Paige and Frankie throw a party at the house. They allow Rodney to ride an electric scooter through the house and allow Zane to eat as much ice cream cake as he wants. Zane vomits after eating too much, and Rodney injures his knee when he crashes the scooter. After comforting the boys, Paige and Frankie realize that there is nothing wrong with being viewed as motherly. Meanwhile, Willow convinces Amelia that Bernie would be the perfect guest to have on Imperfect Imperfection. However, Bernie is upset when he later learns that the only reason he was chosen to be on the channel was because of his imperfections. On Imperfect Imperfection, Amelia has set up an elegant dinner to demonstrate Bernie's messy and clumsy behavior, but she is surprised when he arrives in a suit and behaves perfectly. Amelia winds up making a mess of the dinner, but is happy when she later learns that her fans enjoyed seeing her imperfect behavior. Guest stars: Ellen Ratner as Grandma, Caitlin Reagan as Willow
46	4	"No Way, Whoa!"	David Kendall	Justin Varava	August 2, 2018	304	0.75
Rory Finch, the star of a popular online entertainment show titled No Way, Woah!, visits the Vuuugle House to do a piece on it. Paige and Frankie are nervous during their interview with Rory, and they are later disappointed to learn that she was more interested in Zane and Rodney. Rory becomes upset and leaves after she realizes that Paige and Frankie have been competing against Zane and Rodney for her attention. Liam is worried about the Vuuugle House receiving a bad reputation as a result of the recent rivalry, but Rory is convinced to return to the house to see a dance performance by Paige, Frankie, Zane, and Rodney. Meanwhile, Bernie and Amelia become trapped in his basement bedroom when their only exit is blocked by a delivery of heavy boxes, containing Bernie's weight-lifting equipment. They become delirious but eventually escape through an air conditioning duct. As the others begin their performance, Bernie and Amelia fall from the air duct and become Rory's new interest. Guest stars: Johnathan McClain as Liam, Cyrina Fiallo as Rory Finch
47	5	"Tree's Company"	Sean Mulcahy	Tim Brenner	August 7, 2018	305	0.56
Amelia wants to spend time with Willow, but she realizes that they no longer have common interests. Later, Amelia climbs a tree to retrieve her hat, which had been blown away. Willow, who enjoys saving trees, sees Amelia in the tree and believes that she is there to protest against it being cut down; Amelia fakes an interest in the tree to spend time with Willow. The two sit in the tree until the arrival of a windstorm, when Amelia admits that she does not care about the tree, although Willow is still appreciative of Amelia's effort. Meanwhile, Bernie has decided to portray himself as the villain of the Vuuugle House to make his web show more interesting. Frankie believes she would be a more entertaining villain, and Bernie decides to hold auditions for the role. Bernie eventually hires Frankie, but only to upset her later when he tells her that he actually chose Zane and Rodney. Bernie then reveals to Frankie that this was his plan to convince her that he could be a suitable villain. Guest stars: Caitlin Reagan as Willow, David Lengel as Lou Scoopmaker
48	6	"Summer Schooled"	Erika Kaestle	Alex Fox & Rachel Lewis	August 9, 2018	306	0.56
Frankie learns she did not pass her chemistry class and will need to attend summer school. Paige, who has a vivid imagination, becomes suspicious when she learns that Principal Karen is filling in as the chemistry teacher. Paige concludes that the class is fake and part of a plan by Principal Karen to convince Frankie that she should be a starring member of Bizaardvark. Frankie starts to believe Paige's suspicions, so the two devise a plan to choose Principal Karen as the third member of Bizaardvark, hoping to expose her fake class. However, the girls learn that the class is real, and Paige is then enrolled in summer school as well when Principal Karen realizes that she failed to turn in her final project. Meanwhile, Amelia and Bernie appear on Zane's unboxing channel, but they are upset when Zane decides not to post their footage, as he believes they lack the skills needed to make interesting unboxing videos. Amelia and Bernie fail Zane's training to become better unboxers, but he later injures his wrist and enlists them to star in his latest video, in which they wind up impressing him. Guest star: Rachna Khatau as Principal Karen Absent: Elie Samouhi as Rodney
49	7	"Halloweenvark Part 3: Mali-Boo!"	Jon Rosenbaum	Tim Brenner	October 5, 2018	315	0.53
On Halloween at the Vuuugle House, Paige, Frankie, Amelia, Bernie, Zane, and Rodney forgot to get candy for the trick or treaters and instead tell them three Halloween stories. The first story has Paige and Bernie in a Victor Frankenstein and Igor-type role where they plan to place a genius brain in Frankie for Coach Carlson's science assignment only for Bernie to unknowingly obtain a monster brain since the genius brain is not on sale yet. This causes Frankie to act like Frankenstein's monster before eventually being changed back. In the second story, Zane has undergone an operation to replace his hands with scissors, believing that it will make him a better unboxer. After giving Rodney a haircut, the hair comes to life and terrorizes them, Amelia, and Bernie. When the hair morphs into a giant hair monster, Rodney uses hairspray that gives his hair the ability to attack and destroy the monster. The third story has Bernie discovering a portal in the Vuuugle House's foam pit that takes him to an alternate dimension where everything is made of foam. Paranormal expert Dr. Duckworth helps Paige, Frankie, Zane, and Rodney rescue Bernie, but they learn that he has been made king of the foam world and has no desire to leave. Guest star: Kevin Will as Coach Carlson
50	8	"Holiday Video Sketchtacular"	Sean Mulcahy	Katya Lidsky & Erin Pineda	December 7, 2018	319	0.49
The Vuuugle House produces various sketches to celebrate the holiday season, including one sketch in which Paige and Frankie are lawyers specializing in holiday issues. Another sketch involves Zane and Rodney inaccurately explaining holiday history. In another sketch, Bernie's grandmother is the host of a game show and asks contestants whether Bernie is allowed to open certain gifts, as he is easily prone to injury. The Vuuuglers also audition for various parts in a holiday pageant, including the roles of Santa Claus, a Christmas tree, and a Hanukkah dreidel. Guest stars: Ellen Ratner as Grandma, Caitlin Reagan as Willow, David Lengel as Lou Scoopmaker
51	9	"Who Is Horse Face Guy?"	Robbie Countryman	Matt Roman	January 19, 2019	310	0.59
When Horse Face Guy posts a video of himself dancing, it inspires a new dance craze. Following his increased popularity, Horse Face Guy decides to start speaking, which surprises the other Vuuuglers. He and Roman Winwood, owner of Winwood Studios, arrange a live Internet special for Horse Face Guy to remove his mask and reveal his identity. However, Bernie suspects that this is not the real Horse Face Guy, and he later proves himself right. Bernie is taken to the imposter's house, where the real Horse Face Guy has been tied up. After tying up Bernie, the imposter reveals himself as Ted Mulcahy, a former friend of Horse Face Guy. Ted had been known as Chicken Face Kid because of his chicken mask, and the two had been childhood friends who later began entertaining at local birthday parties, until Horse Face Guy decided to start making Internet videos instead. Jealous of Horse Face Guy's success, Ted plans to pose as him during the unmasking ceremony to claim his wealth and fame. Bernie manages to contact Frankie and Paige, who rescue him and Horse Face Guy. At the ceremony, Ted is revealed as an imposter, and when the audience chants for the real Horse Face Guy to reveal his identity, Bernie convinces them that he wants to remain anonymous. Guest stars: Matt Richards as Roman Winwood, David Lengel as Lou Scoopmaker, Darren Bluestone as Ted Mulcahy, Ross Kobelak as Horse Face Guy
52	10	"Where There's a Willow There's a Way"	Jody Margolin Hahn	Cailan Rose	January 26, 2019	307	0.52
Frankie and Paige agree to do chores for Bernie's grandmother in exchange for tickets to see a DJ. While Paige does her share of chores, Frankie realizes that people do what Willow asks because she is cute. Frankie decides she can use Willow's cuteness to her advantage by having Willow ask other people to do her chores. Frankie keeps her scheme a secret from Willow, telling her that she is too busy planning various environmental projects, something that Willow admires. Paige confronts Frankie upon learning of her scheme, but Paige later uses Willow to get out of posing for a painting that Bernie is making. Frankie and Paige argue over their use of Willow and accidentally mess up Grandma's large jigsaw puzzle. They ask Willow to take the blame, believing that Grandma will not punish her, but they are later proven wrong. Willow and Grandma then reveal their awareness of Paige and Frankie's scheme, and the two girls are grounded. Meanwhile, Amelia becomes obsessed with a song that Bernie has written for his Internet channel and decides to have Roman Winwood, of Winwood Records, listen to the song. However, Amelia has a professional singer, Leyonce, sing the song instead of Bernie, and Roman decides he is not interested in it. Guest stars: Ellen Ratner as Grandma, Caitlin Reagan as Willow, Matt Richards as Roman Winwood, Karibel Rodriguez as Leyonce Absent: Maxwell Simkins as Zane, Elie Samouhi as Rodney
53	11	"House Band"	Jody Margolin Hahn	Eric Friedman	February 2, 2019	308	0.69
Bernie, Rodney and Zane have become close friends, but their loud quality time annoys the other Vuuuglers, so Paige suggests they find a new hobby. When the boys create a band, the other Vuuuglers are upset by their loud music, so Paige has them perform in a garage to maintain peace, telling the boys to stay in there and discover what kind of sound their band should have. The boys later argue over what kind of band they should be, causing them to part ways. Paige learns Bernie felt like a big brother to Zane and Rodney, who were his first friends since Dirk left Vuuugle, so she gathers the boys and convinces them to reconcile and reunite the band. Meanwhile, Frankie helps Amelia plan a surprise party for Willow's 10th birthday. They initially arrange a farm-themed party, as Willow previously lived on a farm in Kentucky. However, shortly before the party begins, Amelia learns Willow is into surfing now, so a California beach party is planned instead. The boys' band performs at the party with Paige as their singer, since the boys are hoarse from a screaming contest that they held out of excitement following the band's reunion. Guest star: Caitlin Reagan as Willow
54	12	"Eye of the Duckworth"	David Kendall	Ron Rappaport	February 9, 2019	309	0.55
Paige and Willow are selling homemade granola at a farmers' market, and they decline Amelia's offer to help them be better businesspeople, as they are not concerned with making a profit. At the farmers' market, an elderly woman named Joyce poses as a friendly grandmother and charms Paige and Willow, who let her take several bags of granola. They realize Joyce is dishonest when she starts selling the granola as her own. To get revenge, the girls accept Amelia's advice, but it winds up turning Paige and Willow against each other as competitors at the market. Meanwhile, Bernie accidentally takes someone else's cell phone and then contacts the owner, a bodybuilder named Sheila. When Bernie requests reward money, Sheila thinks he stole the phone and is blackmailing her, so she threatens him. When she asks Bernie for his identity, he panics and gives his name as Frankie Wong. Frankie then contacts Sheila to explain the situation, but she further angers Sheila. Scared, Frankie gives out her name as Paige Olvera. When Sheila confronts Paige, she, Willow and Amelia stand up to the bodybuilder and scare her away from the market. Witnessing this, Joyce also flees. Paige and Willow then forgive each other. Guest stars: Caitlin Reagan as Willow, Maree Cheatham as Joyce, Twana Barnett as Sheila, Matt Price as Kenny Absent: Maxwell Simkins as Zane, Elie Samouhi as Rodney
55	13	"Bernie's Cousin Ernie"	Sean Mulcahy	Tim Brenner	February 16, 2019	312	0.47
Bernie is nervous about an upcoming visit from his popular cousin, Ernie Plotz, an aspiring doctor who makes Bernie feel jealous and bad about himself. To impress Ernie, Frankie and the other Vuuuglers portray Bernie as being very popular at the Vuuugle House, but this convinces Ernie to give up his future career to instead make Internet videos like Bernie. Frankie, with help from Bernie, stages a fake injury, hoping to convince Ernie that he should continue pursuing a medical career. However, Ernie reveals he has no medical expertise and only made up his popularity to impress Bernie out of jealousy. Bernie admits his own lack of popularity, and Ernie goes on to become an actor, portraying a doctor in a new television series. Meanwhile, Amelia, Willow, and Paige plan to visit an escape room, but they are secretly upset when Bernie's grandmother decides to join them, as they consider her to be crazy. They visit the escape room on their own, while telling Grandma they are only going out for frozen yogurt. However, she discovers their deceit after they finish the game. To make it up to her, they go through the escape room with her, but she destroys various items in the room while searching for clues to win the game. Guest stars: Ellen Ratner as Grandma, Caitlin Reagan as Willow, David Lengel as Lou Scoopmaker, Noah Crawford as Ernie Absent: Maxwell Simkins as Zane, Elie Samouhi as Rodney
56	14	"Paige's Way vs. Frankie's Way"	A. Laura James	Jessica Kaminsky	February 23, 2019	311	0.51
Bernie and Zane have decided to become magicians, but Paige and Frankie have different opinions about their poor magic acts. To settle their disagreement, the girls decide to have a competition: Paige will be supportive of Bernie's magic, while Frankie will be honest with Zane and convince him to do something other than magic. With Paige's support, Bernie decides to perform a dangerous magic act in which he must escape a box before being crushed by a refrigerator. After talking with Frankie, Zane decides to give up magic and ultimately starts a charity. Bernie successfully performs his magic act during a charity event organized by Zane, and the girls realize they were both right in their approaches. Meanwhile, Amelia gets Willow a dress made of hemp and burlap; Willow hates the way it looks and feels, but she keeps this a secret from Amelia, who does not like negative feedback. With help from Bernie's grandmother, Willow tries various methods to destroy the dress and make it look like an accident. However, none of the methods are successful as the dress is made of indestructible materials. Eventually, Willow makes an identical dress in Amelia's size and gives it to her, making her realize the dresses do not make good gifts. Guest stars: Ellen Ratner as Grandma, Caitlin Reagan as Willow Absent: Elie Samouhi as Rodney
57	15	"PK in da House"	Robbie Countryman	Cailan Rose	March 2, 2019	313	0.52
To get Principal Karen off Bizaardvark without hurting her feelings, Paige and Frankie lie to her by claiming Liam has a rule against new members joining their channel. Karen subsequently talks to Liam; unaware of the girls' lie, he hires Karen as the new chaperone of the Vuuugle House while Bernie's grandmother is on a holiday break. Karen redecorates the house, and Paige and Frankie are annoyed by her. Knowing that Liam dislikes talking to people, the girls tell Karen that Liam expects to be updated regularly by her, hoping she will annoy him to the point of being fired. However, Liam secretly falls in love with Karen and asks the girls to set them up on a date. Instead, they confess to Karen, and their scheme makes her think they are obsessed with her. As a result, Karen quits Bizaardvark and her chaperone job. Meanwhile, Amelia and Bernie want to try a restaurant's chocolate pancakes, but they are a children's menu item only available to those under the age of 12. Bernie and Amelia enlist Zane and Rodney in a plot to acquire the pancakes. Their first attempt is a success, but they are caught during a second attempt. Guest stars: Johnathan McClain as Liam, Rachna Khatau as Principal Karen, Sonya Leslie as Dina
58	16	"Bizaardvark Changes Lives"	Marian Deaton	Justin Varava	March 9, 2019	314	0.60
Paige and Frankie introduce a Bizaardvark segment in which they answer their viewers' questions, hoping to have a positive impact on their lives. The girls offer their advice to a boy named Jackson on how to ask his crush Sasha to a school dance, but his attempt does not go as planned when he follows the girls' contradictory advice. Wanting to fix the situation, Paige and Frankie arrive at the dance posing as Jackson's dates, hoping to make Sasha jealous enough to go out with him. However, he and Sasha are at the dance together already, after he asked her again. Thinking that Jackson has other dates, Sasha ends her relationship with him. Paige and Frankie are banned from Jackson's school, but still want to help him. They fly a drone into his school to communicate with him, but the drone goes out of control. While avoiding the drone, Jackson injures his ankle and is helped by Sasha, rekindling their relationship. Meanwhile, Willow spends time with Bernie and starts to act like him. When Amelia realizes this, she forbids Willow from hanging out with Bernie. Guest stars: Caitlin Reagan as Willow, Nicolas Cantu as Jackson, Ashley Brooke as Sasha Absent: Maxwell Simkins as Zane, Elie Samouhi as Rodney
59	17	"A Capella Problems"	Jon Rosenbaum	Alex Fox & Rachel Lewis	March 16, 2019	316	0.47
Paige is happy to be accepted into the school's a cappella group, despite having only a small role. Frankie, believing that Paige is deserving of a solo singing role, talks to the group leader, Mr. Finkle. In response, he kicks Paige out of the group, believing she is a diva. Although Frankie explains that Paige had nothing to do with the solo idea, Finkle still declines to let her rejoin, prompting the two to form their own a cappella group. However, school rules require any a cappella group to have at least four voices. To bypass this rule, Paige and Frankie create a video of themselves singing to accompany their live performance during a school concert. Their performance is well received, and the members of Finkle's group abandon him to join Paige and Frankie's group. Meanwhile, Amelia is set to appear in an advertising campaign for coconut water, but she loses a diamond necklace that she was supposed to wear in the upcoming photoshoot. Bernie, Zane and Rodney have developed an interest in metal detectors after they start spending time with Rodney's great uncle Morty and his elderly friends; the group later uses their metal detectors to help Amelia find the necklace. Guest stars: Paul Dooley as Uncle Morty, Jack Plotnick as Mr. Finkle, Tania Gunadi as Natalie, Nayah Damasen as Kathy
60	18	"The Stand-Up Standoff"	Jody Margolin Hahn	Eric Friedman	March 23, 2019	317	0.57
Paige and Frankie attend an open mic stand-up comedy routine at a café, where Frankie is also performing. Frankie initially fails to make the audience laugh until she starts joking about Paige's positive personality. Paige is upset by the jokes, but keeps her feelings a secret from Frankie. The hosts of the routine, Brittany and Whitney, have Frankie come back the next night to perform again, during which Frankie has Paige come onstage to talk about herself. When Paige jokes about Frankie, the two begin insulting each other; Brittany and Whitney decide to have them perform against each other later in an insult competition. Before the contest, Frankie learns that Brittany and Whitney gave up their friendship so they could insult each other for their own comedy routine, which prompts Frankie to reconcile with Paige. Meanwhile, Bernie loses a bet with Amelia and as a result, she can have him perform a one-time chicken dance whenever she chooses. When Bernie learns that a student named Lindsey likes him, he worries that Amelia will have him perform the dance in front of Lindsey and embarrass him. He eventually tells Amelia about his concern, and she calls off the bet. Guest stars: Ellen Ratner as Grandma, Brittany Ross as Brittany, Natalie Lander as Whitney, Stephanie Cood as Lindsey, Philip Labes as Heckler Absent: Maxwell Simkins as Zane, Elie Samouhi as Rodney
61	19	"BizRipOffs"	Erika Kaestle	Ron Rappaport	March 30, 2019	318	0.49
Zane and Rodney have developed crushes on their fellow students Mallory and Tiffany, who are Bizaardvark fans. To impress their crushes, the boys ask Paige and Frankie to speak in their school class. During their speech, Paige and Frankie mention their latest Bizaardvark video idea, which is later duplicated by Mallory and Tiffany's new web channel. Mallory and Tiffany visit the Vuuugle House to apologize to Paige and Frankie for using their idea. Paige and Frankie forgive them, but subsequently learn their Bizaardvark idea notebook has been stolen by the girls, who were using Zane and Rodney to get close to Bizaardvark in order to steal the ideas. Meanwhile, Bernie encourages Willow to write a letter to a fictional superhero character named Lucy Lightning. To keep Willow from getting upset, Bernie and Amelia write letters back to her, both masquerading as Lucy Lightning. Willow believes that Lucy Lightning has agreed to have lunch with her, so Amelia dresses up as the superhero to avoid disappointing her. However, the real Lucy Lightning actress arrives in costume, and Willow reveals that she knew all along that the letters were from Bernie and Amelia. Guest stars: Caitlin Reagan as Willow, Eva Hauge as Mallory, Abigail Dylan Harrison as Tiffany, Christie Herring as Lucy Lightning
62	20	"Rozes Are Red"	Jon Rosenbaum	Jessica Kaminsky	April 6, 2019	320	0.52
Frankie gets driving lessons from Bernie's grandmother, Roz, but Frankie loses her confidence and decides to quit her lessons after nearly running over Horse Face Guy's cat. Amelia and Willow's father, Red, visits the Vuuugle House, and he and Roz fall in love. Later, Bernie and Amelia mistakenly believe that Red plans to propose marriage to Roz, after reading a note he left her. Not wanting to become siblings, Bernie and Amelia intend to foil Red's proposal. They have Paige and Frankie take Roz out as a driving instructor again, despite Frankie's concerns about her driving. At the house, Bernie and Amelia gather three of Roz's ex-husbands to show Red that a relationship with her would not work out. Meanwhile, Willow unknowingly takes control of Frankie's vehicle through a tablet computer program, which Willow and Zane think is a video game. Frankie, Paige, and Roz are recklessly driven around before Willow gets bored with the program. When Frankie reveals her lack of driving confidence, Roz helps her regain faith in herself, and the girls decide to tell Roz that Red had planned to propose to her. Bernie and Amelia realize they misread the note, although Red and Roz decide to get married anyway. Special guest star: Darrell Hammond as Red Duckworth Guest stars: Ellen Ratner as Grandma, Caitlin Reagan as Willow Absent: Elie Samouhi as Rodney
63	21	"The End of the Beginning"	Jon Rosenbaum	Teleplay by : Eric Friedman; Story by : Savannah Kopp	April 13, 2019	321	0.55
Red and Grandma Roz get married, and Bernie, Amelia, and Willow become siblings. Liam announces that he is selling Vuuugle to resolve financial issues he is facing. Because of the sale, the Vuuuglers are forced to move out of the Vuuugle House. Bernie and his new sisters relocate with Red and Grandma to the Duckworth farm in Kentucky. Meanwhile, Roman Winwood has decided to create a show starring Paige and Frankie that will detail life in the Vuuugle House. Paige and Frankie go to New York to film the series on a set resembling the Vuuugle House. They meet the actors portraying Bernie and Amelia on the show, but the girls are disappointed that the actors are not interested in being friends with them. Feeling sad, Paige and Frankie gather Zane, Rodney, and Horse Face Guy for a group visit to see Bernie and Amelia. Meanwhile, Amelia and Bernie decide to visit Paige and Frankie in New York. They soon return to Kentucky once they learn the others are there at the farm. Upon reuniting, the Vuuugle group mentions the idea of either moving to the Duckworth farm or to Paige and Frankie's new penthouse in New York. Paige realizes that it does not matter where they are, as long as they are together. Special guest star: Darrell Hammond as Red Duckworth Guest stars: Ellen Ratner as Grandma, Johnathan McClain as Liam, Caitlin Reagan as Willow, Rachna Khatau as Principal Karen, Matt Richards as Roman Winwood, Adam Haas Hunter as Viking Guy, David Lengel as Lou Scoopmaker, Brooke Sorenson as Actor Amelia, Zach Hoffman as Actor Bernie

== Bizaardvark Shorts (2017) ==
- Bizaardvark Shorts consists of 2–4-minute shorts.

No.	Title	Original release date
1	"BizaArmBox"	May 8, 2017
2	"BizaArm Wrestling"	May 9, 2017
3	"BizHard Time"	May 10, 2017
4	"BizaArtists"	May 11, 2017
5	"BizaArxercise"	May 12, 2017
6	"BizaAnticipation"	June 19, 2017
7	"BizaRock Paper Scissors"	June 20, 2017
8	"BizaArtifacts"	June 21, 2017
9	"BizaArmed & Dangerous"	June 22, 2017
10	"BizHaircut"	June 23, 2017
11	"BizaArgentina"	June 28, 2017
12	"BizaArmageddon"	July 7, 2017
13	"BizaAroma"	July 14, 2017
14	"BizFeet"	July 21, 2017
