= Disney Channel Storytellers =

Disney Channel Storytellers is an annual program run by Disney Channel and It's a Laugh Productions which focuses on discovering and developing new talent in series creators and writers for programs on the channel. The salaried program runs for twenty weeks annually and is open to writers who are professionally represented. Disney Channel Storytellers was launched in 2014.

== Background ==
The Disney Chanel Storytellers program was developed as an initiative by Disney Channel and It's a Laugh Productions to develop new talent in series creators and writers for original programming content on Disney Channel and Disney XD. The participants are mentored by experienced advisers which include Disney Channel’s executives and producers in programming and development. Vice president of Disney Channels Worldwide, Jennilee Cummings, explained how the idea was conceived in an effort to search for a writers in a non-traditional way, stating, "Storytellers is a way to tap into some new voices and hopefully the end result will be programming that feels really fresh."

Participants (individuals or writing teams) of the salaried program develop one live-action script for consideration of a pilot, while creating ideas for potential programming and working on Disney’s existing development projects. Participants also contribute their writing services in other areas, such as original scripts and digital content. The program also extends to mentoring in pilot production and pitching to networks.

== History ==
=== 2014–15: First year and Bizaardvark ===
Disney Channel Storytellers was launched in 2014, with applications for the inaugural program opened in April. The program ran from August to January 2015 at Disney’s headquarters in Burbank, California. The program was run by Marc Warren, a multiple Emmy-nominated writer and producer, who had previously worked on Full House and Disney Channel series such as Even Stevens, That’s So Raven and Jonas. Warren stated he was looking for scripts that were "edgy" and for writers with "a quirky voice". The participants included three teams of two and one individual, chosen after hundreds of submissions. These included a writing team of Lacey Dyer and Julia Layton (Days of Our Lives), duo Kyle Stegina and Josh Lehrman, a partnership of Paul Jafee and Sophie Pustil, and soloist Sara Saedi. Participants were mentored by producers such as Rob Lotterstein, the showrunner of K.C. Undercover.

The first program to be created as a result of Disney Channel Storytellers was Bizaardvark, created by participants Stegina and Lehrman during their tenure. Originally known as Paige and Frankie, a pilot for the series was ordered in May 2015, before being greenlit for a full series order (retitled as Bizaardvark) in October 2015. The series stars Olivia Rodrigo and Madison Hu as Paige and Frankie respectively, two friends who create comedic music videos for their online channel called "Bizaardvark". Warren served as the executive producer for the pilot, while Stegina and Lehrman became co-executive producers for the series, alongside executive producer and showrunner Eric Friedman (Austin & Ally, Crash & Bernstein). The pair explained how they felt there were no Disney series centred around comedic music, and were inspired by contemporary online culture. Lehrman stated, "the emphasis [of the series] is on embracing your weirdness, and that’s what I’m most excited about." The series premiered in June 2016.

A second team from the inaugural group of writers; Dyer and Layton, joined the writing staff of Disney Channel’s Bunk'd in its first season. The pair wrote three episodes. (Note: Dyer and Layton wrote the episodes "Smells Like Camp Spirit", "Close Encounters of the Camp Kind", and "Boo Boos and Birthdays".)

=== 2015–16: Second year ===
Applications for the second year of Disney Channel Storytellers opened in September 2015, with the program to take place from November to April 2016. Warren returned as the program’s supervisor. The five participants were announced in February 2016 as Farhan Arshad (Dr. Ken, The McCarthys), Han-Yee Ling (Tangled: Before Ever After), Rachel McNevin (Austin & Ally), and the duo of Hunter Cope and Adam Aseraf (Sanjay and Craig).
