= Night Shift (2023 film) =

Horror film

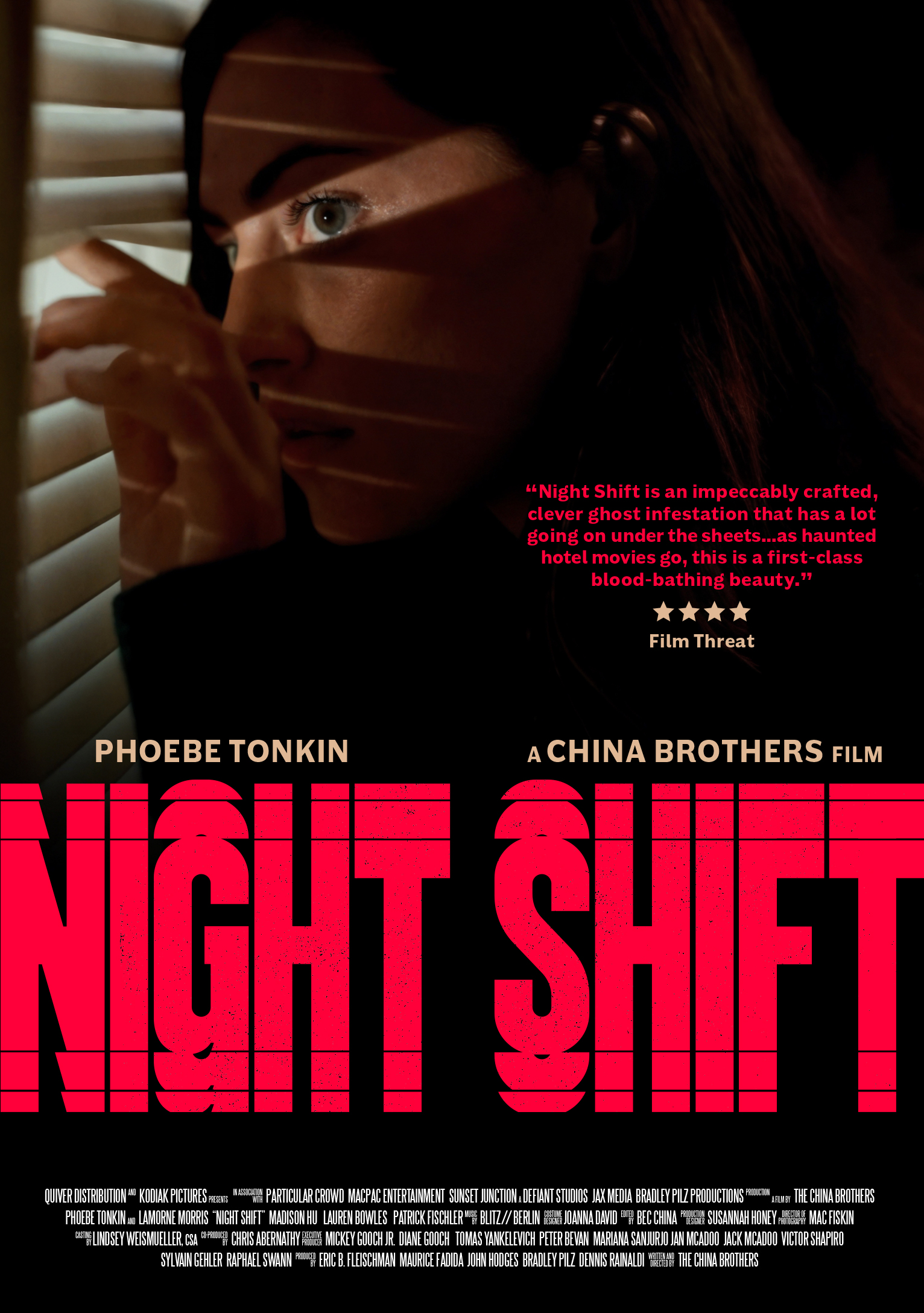
- Release poster
- Directed by: The China Brothers
- Screenplay by: The China Brothers
- Produced by: Eric B. Fleischman; Maurice Fadida; John Hodges; Bradley Pilz; Dennis Rainaldi; Chris Abernathy
- Starring: Phoebe Tonkin; Lamorne Morris; Madison Hu
- Cinematography: Mac Fisken
- Edited by: Bec China
- Music by: Blitz//Berlin
- Production companies: Defiant Studios; Bradley Pilz Productions; Jax Media; Kodiak Pictures; Sunset Junction Entertainment
- Distributed by: Quiver Distribution
- Release dates: March 3, 2023 (Mammoth Film Festival); March 8, 2024 (United States)
- Running time: 82 minutes
- Country: United States
- Language: English
- Budget: $500,000

Night Shift is a 2023 American horror film written and directed by Paul and Benjamin China, in their directorial debut. The film stars Phoebe Tonkin, Lamorne Morris, and Madison Hu.

== Plot ==
Gwen Taylor (Phoebe Tonkin) takes a job working her first overnight shift at the remote All Tucked Inn motel. She is introduced to the motel’s owner, Teddy Miles (Lamorne Morris), who gives her a brief tour and warns her that the night shift can feel long and lonely. Early in her shift, Gwen notices odd disturbances: lights flicker, doors creak open without cause, and she hears faint noises in the empty hallways. She also encounters Alice Marsh (Madison Hu), a teenage guest staying at the motel after running away from her mother, who claims she has seen people walking the halls who then vanish when approached.

As the night continues, Gwen begins to suspect she is not alone. She receives unsettling phone calls with static and whispers on the line, and glimpses of a shadowy man who seems to be following her in his car. These sightings unnerve Gwen, as they resemble a figure from her troubled past. Her attempts to contact Teddy for reassurance only deepen her anxiety, as he avoids her questions about the motel’s history. Alice, increasingly frightened, insists the motel is haunted and warns Gwen that something “doesn’t want them there.” Having dinner together, Gwen tells Alice about the man who murdered her family, Walton Grey, and believes he's escaped prison.

The disturbances escalate into full apparitions. Gwen sees ghostly figures in the hallways and experiences vivid visions such as a ghostly figure coming out of the sinkhole in the empty pool. Gwen is left uncertain whether she is experiencing supernatural activity, being hunted by a human threat, or suffering from paranoia brought on by her traumatic past.

After evading the apparitions, Gwen returns to the front desk as a car pulls into the lot. A middle-aged man enters and asks to check in. Gwen recognizes his face as the man convicted of killing her family and recently reported as having escaped prison. She stalls, pretending to verify a room, while quietly reaching for a makeshift weapon from the office. Leading him to his room, she takes the opportunity to stab the man with a pair of scissors. As he puts pressure onto his wound, the man admits that he is not Walton Grey, but rather Gwen's psychiatrist treating her for her paranoia. He reveals that Walton Grey is a figment of her imagination and an anagram of her own name, and that Gwen was the one who killed her family. Recalling everything that happened the night she killed her family, she murders her doctor and cuts out his tongue.

Waiting in their van outside, two orderlies from the mental hospital go check on the psychiatrist who hasn't been answering his phone. Before entering the room, Gwen appears with her hands covered in blood, offering to show the two men inside. Closing the door behind her, she begins to murder them as well. Alice, who hears strange noises from her own room, goes to check on the disturbance and opens the door to find one dead worker and the other in the process of being murdered by Gwen. Seeing what has happened, Alice runs away and is pursued by Gwen around the motel. Finally catching her, Gwen stabs Alice in the stomach with an axe. Arriving to the motel after his earlier call with Gwen, Teddy finds Gwen standing by the pool and invites him over to show him something. The screen fades to black but it is assumed that Gwen kills him too.

One year later, Gwen has revitalized the motel by giving it a paint job and fixing the sink hole to fill up the pool. Cole (Connor Price), driving to college, stops at the motel for the night and admires the pool when Gwen appears next to him and offers to check him in. Taking the man's payment, she sees the ghosts of her murdered family standing behind the man, and the ghost of Alice standing next to her. Asking if she is okay, Gwen offers to show the man to his room.

== Cast ==
- Phoebe Tonkin as Gwen Taylor
- Lamorne Morris as Teddy Miles
- Madison Hu as Alice Marsh
- Christopher Denham as Walton Grey
- Patrick Fischler as Warner
- Lauren Bowles as Birdie
- Connor Price as Cole

== Production ==
The film was shot in Los Angeles over 17 days during the COVID-19 pandemic.

== Release ==
Night Shift had its world premiere at the Mammoth Film Festival in 2023, where it won Best Genre Film. The film was released in the United States on March 8 by Quiver in limited theatrical and VOD.

== Reception ==
Night Shift received positive reviews, scoring a 78% fresh rating from critics and a 84% fresh rating from audiences on Rotten Tomatoes.

Michael Talbot-Haynes of Film Threat gave the film a score of 8.5 out of 10 stars, saying "Night Shift is an impeccably crafted, clever ghost infestation that has a lot going on under the sheets...as haunted hotel movies go, this is a first-class blood-bathing beauty."

Morgan Muscat of Rue Morgue called the film "An impressive and ambitious debut...the China Brothers imbue their film with a healthy supply of atmosphere and intrinsic creepiness, productively exploiting their single location to effective potential."

== Accolades ==
Award	Category	Subject	Result
Mammoth Film Festival	Festival Trophy for Best Genre Film	The China Brothers	Won
