= Brad Garrett =

American comedian and actor (born 1960)

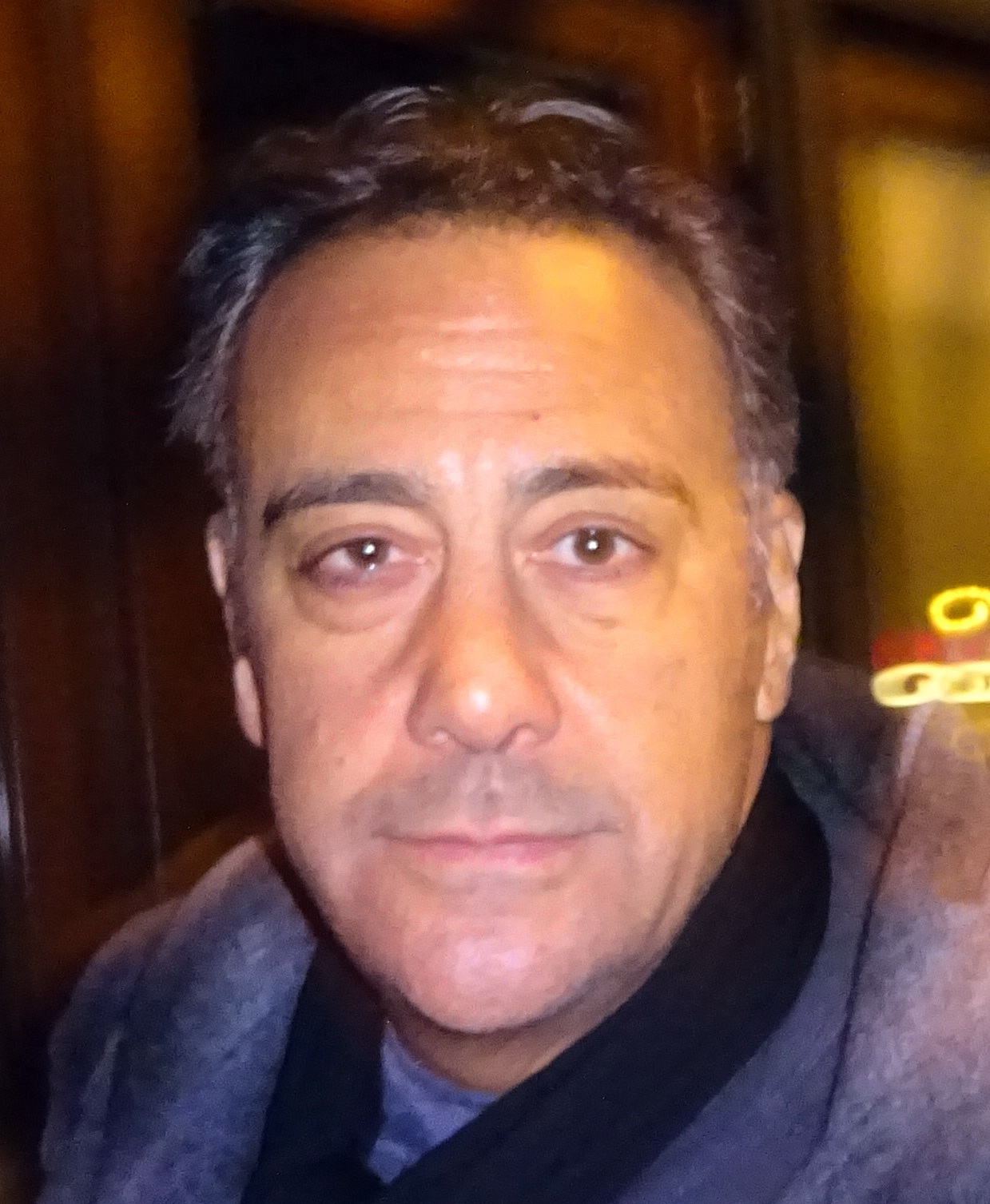
- Garrett in 2016
- Born: Brad H. Gerstenfeld; April 14, 1960 (age 66); Oxnard, California, U.S.
- Education: University of California, Los Angeles
- Occupations: Stand-up comedian; actor
- Spouses: Jill Diven (m. 1999; div. 2007) IsaBeall Quella (m. 2021)
- Children: 2

Comedy career
- Years active: 1980–present
- Medium: Stand-up; television; film
- Genres: Observational comedy; prop comedy; improvisational comedy; insult comedy; satire
- Subjects: American politics; American culture; marriage; family; human interaction; social awkwardness; gender differences; current events
- Website: bradgarrettcomedy.com

Brad H. Gerstenfeld (born April 14, 1960), known professionally as Brad Garrett, is an American stand-up comedian and actor.

In the early 1980s, Garrett was initially successful as a stand-up comedian. In the late 1980s, he leveraged that success as he began appearing in television and film, in minor and guest roles. His first major role was as Robert Barone on the CBS sitcom Everybody Loves Raymond, which debuted September 13, 1996, and ran for nine seasons. In 2002, he gave an Emmy-nominated and critically lauded performance as Jackie Gleason in the television film Gleason. Garrett also played the leading role of Eddie Stark on the Fox sitcom 'Til Death from 2006 to 2010. From 2018 to 2020, he starred in the ABC sitcom Single Parents.

In 2021, Garrett helped create Disney+'s Big Shot with David E. Kelley and Dean Lorey, and is known for voicing the Big Dog on 2 Stupid Dogs, as well as for the films such as Casper (1995), A Bug's Life (1998), An Extremely Goofy Movie (2000), The Country Bears (2002), Finding Nemo (2003), Garfield (2004), Tarzan II, Tom and Jerry: Blast Off to Mars (both 2005), Ratatouille (2007), Tangled (2010), Hoodwinked Too! Hood vs. Evil (2011), Planes franchise (2013-14), Teenage Mutant Ninja Turtles: Out of the Shadows (2016), Christopher Robin (2018) and Elio (2025). He later became the current voice of Eeyore in Disney's Winnie the Pooh franchise, becoming Peter Cullen's successor after his death in 2026.

Garrett has won three Primetime Emmy Awards, with three other nominations. He is still prominent within stand-up comedy and owns Brad Garrett's Comedy Club at the MGM Grand in Las Vegas, where he performs regularly.

== Early life ==
Garrett was born Brad H. Gerstenfeld on April 14, 1960, to Barbara and Alvin "Al" Gerstenfeld in Oxnard, California. He is Jewish. His grandparents were from Russia and Poland. Garrett has two brothers, Jeff and Paul. He attended George Ellery Hale Middle School and graduated from El Camino Real High School, both in the Woodland Hills section of Los Angeles, California. Garrett attended UCLA for less than two months before dropping out to pursue his comedy career.

== Career ==
Before comedy, Garrett was known for being on the rear cover of ELO's eighth studio album Discovery. In the early 1980s, he started doing standup at various comedy clubs in Los Angeles, including The Improv in Hollywood and The Ice House in Pasadena. In 1984, he became the first $100,000 grand champion winner in the comedy category of the TV show Star Search. This led to his first appearance, at age 23, on The Tonight Show Starring Johnny Carson, making him one of the youngest comedians ever to perform on the show. His appearance with Carson brought Garrett more national attention, and soon he was appearing as an opening act for such headliners as Diana Ross and Liza Minnelli. He also opened in Las Vegas for Frank Sinatra, David Copperfield, Smokey Robinson, Sammy Davis Jr., the Beach Boys, The Righteous Brothers, and Julio Iglesias.

After achieving a strong measure of success with stand-up comedy, Garrett began performing on TV. From 1985 to 1986, he was the voice of Hulk Hogan (in a voice similar to Rodney Dangerfield) in the animated series Hulk Hogan's Rock 'n Wrestling. He was featured on Family Feud during Ray Combs's tenure in a "Funny Men vs. Funny Women Week" during November sweeps. He also appeared for a week on the game show Super Password in 1987. He also appeared on Hollywood Squares including a moment when he impersonated Bill Cosby during a question about Jell-o. He then appeared in the short-lived summer comedy First Impressions (CBS, 1988), in which he was a divorced father who makes a living doing impressions, in a one-time spot as a bank loan officer on Roseanne (ABC), and The Pursuit of Happiness (NBC, 1995–96), in which he was the hero's gay best friend. Prior to these roles, Garrett had also had a minor part on Transformers, voicing the Decepticon base Trypticon in season three and as an ill-fated thug in Suicide Kings. He soon won the role of Ray Romano's brother Robert Barone on the family-oriented comedy Everybody Loves Raymond, and in 1998, he and Romano appeared together in their respective roles on a Season 1 episode of The King of Queens, titled "Road Rayge", in which Robert is jealous of his brother spending so much time with Doug Heffernan (the main character played by Kevin James). Garrett also appeared on The Fresh Prince of Bel-Air playing a hitman who attempts to kill Will Smith.

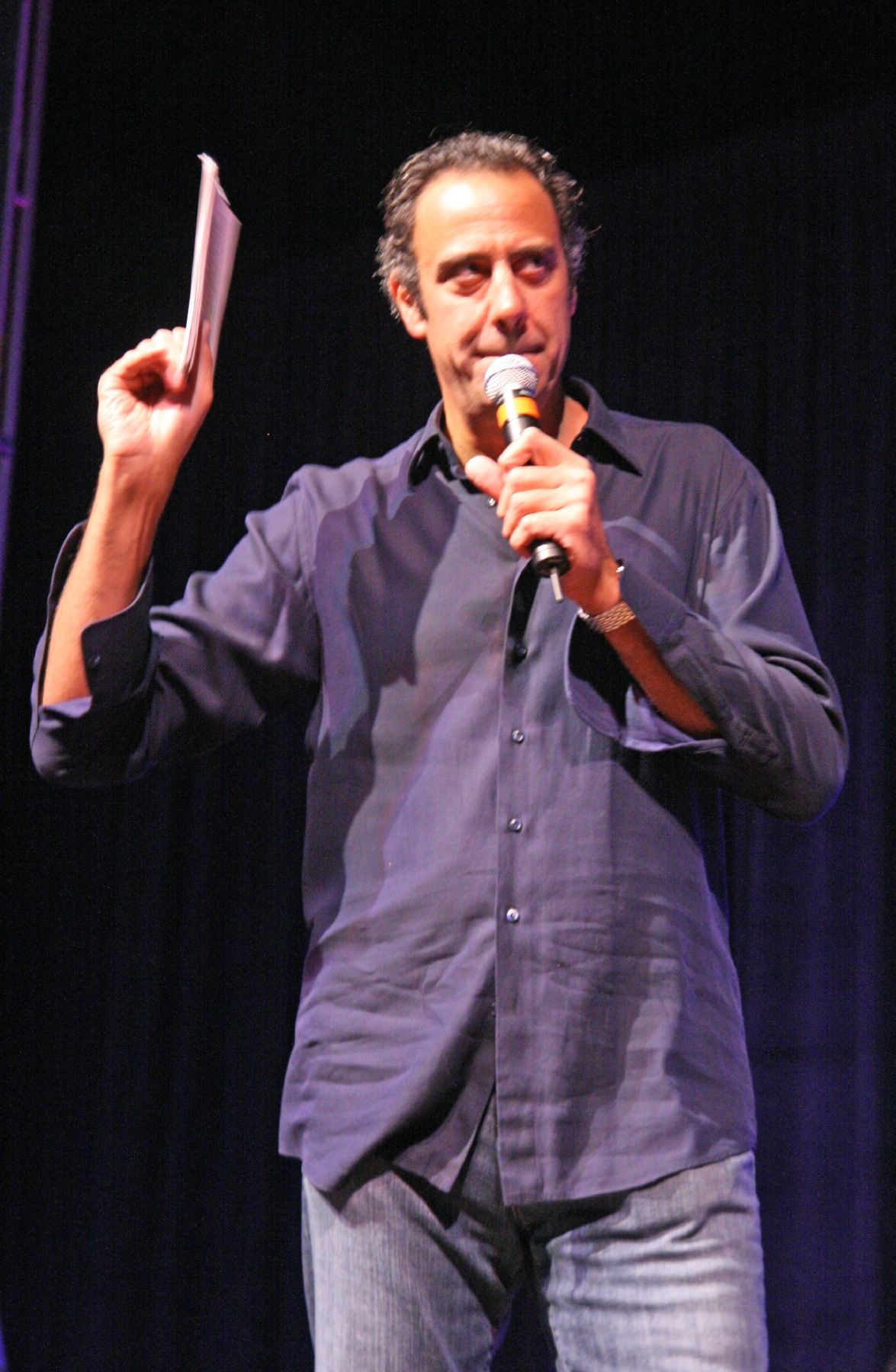
Garrett in 2007

His role on Everybody Loves Raymond won him five Emmy Award nominations, and the 2002, 2003 and 2005 Emmy Awards for Outstanding Supporting Actor in a Comedy Series.

In 1990, Garrett appeared as a semi-regular panelist on the revival of Match Game. On the May 2, 1996, episode of the sitcom Seinfeld, called "The Bottle Deposit", Garrett played a rogue auto mechanic who steals Jerry Seinfeld's car.

In 2003, Garrett was nominated for the Emmy Award for Outstanding Lead Actor in a Miniseries or Movie for Gleason. With his Raymond castmates, he won the 2003 Screen Actors Guild Award for Outstanding Performance by an Ensemble in a Comedy Series. He won the fifth season championship of Celebrity Poker Showdown, and played in the 2005, 2006 and 2007 World Series of Poker. Garrett was hoping to do a spin-off with his character Robert Barone from Everybody Loves Raymond when the show ended its nine-year run in 2005, but he withdrew in October 2005 due to inaction from CBS that led to a number of the writers from Raymond leaving and taking other jobs.

In 2005, Garrett appeared on Broadway playing Murray the Cop in the revival of Neil Simon's The Odd Couple with Nathan Lane and Matthew Broderick. He understudied Lane in the role of Oscar Madison, and substituted for him in January 2006, during Lane's illness. That same year, he starred in The Pacifier opposite Vin Diesel. In 2006, Fox announced they would pick up a new sitcom called 'Til Death starring Garrett in the lead role. The plot revolves around a long married couple whose new next door neighbors are a pair of feisty newlyweds. Joely Fisher plays Garrett's wife in the series. He also appeared onstage on American Idol season six (2007) during judging on week 11, to which Ryan Seacrest said, "And the next person off American Idol is—Brad, you're out."

In the fall of 2008, Garrett starred in, and was the executive producer for, the online reality series Dating Brad Garrett. In 2008, Garrett hosted a celebrity roast of Cheech & Chong, which was aired on TBS.

In 2009, Garrett entered the main event at the World Series of Poker, losing on the second day of the event. Garrett has starred in commercials for 7-Up, where he portrays a more happy, cheerful version of himself because of the soda.

In June 2010, he opened Brad Garrett's Comedy Club in the Tropicana Resort and Casino in Las Vegas. In December 2010, he was one of the narrators during performances of the Candlelight Processional at Epcot.

In June 2011, I Kid with Brad Garrett, a children's series starring Garrett, premiered on TLC. On December 12, 2011, Garrett closed his club at the Tropicana. He started a new club with the same name across the street at the MGM Grand, and is active as of April 2016.

In the summer of 2013, Garrett played Chug in the film Planes, marking the fourth time he starred in a film with John Ratzenberger. In the fall of 2013, Garrett played a recurring character in The Crazy Ones. In May 2016, he was confirmed to appear as the voice of Krang, in the sci-fi action comedy film Teenage Mutant Ninja Turtles: Out of the Shadows.

Garrett encouraging people to "stay home to save lives" as part of the Government of California's COVID-19 pandemic public service announcements in 2020

In November 2016, Garrett portrayed Frankenstein's monster in a Christmas commercial for Apple's iPhone 7. As of 2017, the ad has received over seven million views.

In 2018, Garrett voiced the character Eeyore in the live-action film Christopher Robin, based on Disney's Winnie the Pooh franchise, and in a cameo in the animated film Ralph Breaks the Internet. He previously voiced the character in the 1995 video game Disney's Animated Storybook: Winnie the Pooh and the Honey Tree.

As of 2021, he portrays a character named Tony Bolognavich in Jimmy John's commercials.

When asked whether he would do a revival of Everybody Loves Raymond, he stated:

There's no show without the parents. That's really the bottom line. Doris and Peter were such a huge part of the show. I miss them but some things you don't go back to, you know. We could never recreate that.

== Personal life ==
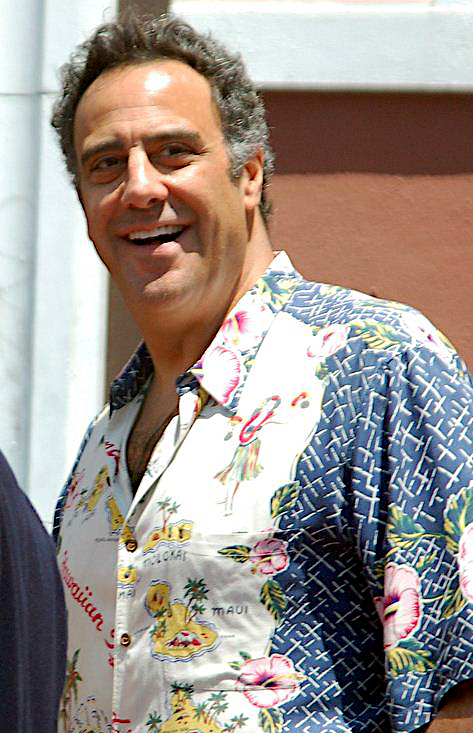
Garrett in 2012

In 1998, Garrett proposed to his then-girlfriend, Jill Diven, on the set of Everybody Loves Raymond, and they were married on May 18, 1999; together they have two children, a son and a daughter. Garrett and Diven separated in 2005, and Diven filed for divorce in July 2006. The divorce was finalized in November 2007.

In 2008, he began dating actress IsaBeall Quella, whom he met at a Vose art gallery in Boston. They were engaged in December 2015. The couple married on November 11, 2021.

Garrett stated in an interview in May 2015, that as his acting career began, he achieved sobriety from alcoholism, later admitting he was a "high-functioning alcoholic".

== Filmography ==
=== Film ===
Year	Title	Role	Notes
1986	Transformers: Five Faces of Darkness	Trypticon (voice)	Direct to video
1990	Jetsons: The Movie	Bertie Furbelow (voice)	
1995	Casper	Fatso (voice)	
1996	Spy Hard	Short Rancor Guard (voice)	
1996	Mighty Ducks the Movie: The First Face-Off	Grin	Voice, direct to video
1996	A Delicatessen Story	Sheldon Lutz	Short film
1997	George B.	Security Guard	
1997	Suicide Kings	Jeckyll	
1997	Sea World and Busch Gardens Adventures: Alien Vacation!	Robert	
1998	Postal Worker	Oren Starks	
1998	Pocahontas II: Journey to a New World	Uttamatomakkin	Voice, direct to video
1998	A Bug's Life	Dim	Voice
1999	Façade	Henry	
1999	Sweet and Lowdown	Joe Bedloe	
2000	An Extremely Goofy Movie	Tank	Voice, direct to video
2001	Bleacher Bums	Marvin	
2002	The Country Bears	Fred Bedderhead	Voice
2002	Stuart Little 2	Rob the Plumber	
2003	The Trailer	Victim	Short film
2003	Finding Nemo	Bloat	Voice
2004	Garfield: The Movie	Luca	Voice
2005	The Amateurs	Wally	
2005	Porco Rosso	Mamma Aiuto Boss	Voice, English dub
2005	The Pacifier	Vice Principal Dwayne Murney	
2005	Tom and Jerry: Blast Off to Mars	Commander Bristle, Martian Guard No. 3	Voice, direct to video
2005	Mickey's Around the World in 80 Days	Additional Voices	Direct to video
2005	Tarzan II	Uto	Voice, direct to video
2006	Asterix and the Vikings	Obelix	Voice, Original version
2006	Night at the Museum	Easter Island Head	Voice
2007	Music and Lyrics	Chris Riley	
2007	Finding Nemo Submarine Voyage	Bloat	Voice, short film
2007	Ratatouille	Auguste Gusteau	Voice
2007	Underdog	Riff Raff	Voice
2007	Christmas Is Here Again	Charlee	Voice, direct to video
2008	3 Pigs and a Baby	Mason Pig	Voice
2009	Night at the Museum: Battle of the Smithsonian	Easter Island Head	Voice
2010	Tangled	Hook Hand Thug	Voice
2011	Hoodwinked Too! Hood vs. Evil	The Giant	Voice
2012	Not Fade Away	Jerry Ragovoy	
2012	Delhi Safari	Bagga	Voice, English dub
2013	The Incredible Burt Wonderstone	Dominic 'Dom', Burt's Lawyer	
2013	Planes	Chug	Voice
2014	Planes: Fire & Rescue	Chug	Voice
2014	Night at the Museum: Secret of the Tomb	Easter Island Head	Voice
2014	The Clockwork Girl	T-Bolt	Voice
2016	Teenage Mutant Ninja Turtles: Out of the Shadows	Krang	Voice
2016	Finding Dory	Bloat	Voice
2018	Christopher Robin	Eeyore	Voice
2018	Ralph Breaks the Internet	Eeyore	Voice, cameo
2018	Gloria Bell	Dustin	
2019	Jake and Kyle Get Wedding Dates	Stu Westen	Voice, direct to video
2022	Cha Cha Real Smooth	Stepdad Greg	
2022	Wildflower	Earl	
2024	Saturday Night	Borscht Belt comedian	
2025	Magic Hour	Erin's Friend	
2025	Elio	Lord Grigon	Voice

=== Television ===
Year	Title	Role	Notes
1983–1984	Star Search	As himself	Grand Champion in Comedy category
1985–1986	Hulk Hogan's Rock 'n' Wrestling	Hulk Hogan	Voice, 23 episodes
1986	The Transformers	Trypticon	Voice, 5 episodes
1987	The Real Ghostbusters	Arzuun, Tolay	Voice, episode: "Egon's Ghost"
1988	First Impressions	Frank Dutton	8 episodes
1990	The Adventures of Don Coyote and Sancho Panda	Rosinante	Voice, main role
1991	Where's Wally?	Wizard Whitebeard	Voice, main role
1991	Roseanne	Doug	Episode: "The Pied Piper of Lanford"
1991	Tom & Jerry Kids	Sir Butch-a-Lot	Voice, episode: "Catch That Mouse/Good Knight Droopy/Birthday Surprise"
1992	Goof Troop	Big Boy Bandit	Voice, episode: "To Catch a Goof"
1992–1996	Eek! The Cat	Thuggo, additional voices	21 episodes
1993	The Legend of Prince Valiant	King Aaron Goth	Voice, episode: "The Eyes of the Serpent"
1993	Mighty Max	Spike	Voice, episode: "Norman's Conquest"
1993	Biker Mice from Mars	Greasepit	Voice
1993	Wild West C.O.W.-Boys of Moo Mesa	Longhorn Silver	Voice, episode: "Cow Pirates of Swampy Cove"
1993	Problem Child	Additional voices	
1993	Bonkers	Louse, Babyface, Wolf, Fireball Frank	4 episodes
1993	Marsupilami	Santa Claus	Voice, episode: "Jingle Bells, Something Smells"
1993	Hollyrock-a-Bye Baby	Big Rock	Voice, television film
1993–1995	2 Stupid Dogs	Big Dog	Voice, main cast
1993–1996	Biker Mice from Mars	Greasepit	Voice, main cast
1994	The Fresh Prince of Bel-Air	John "Fingers" O'Neill	Episode: "Fresh Prince: The Movie"
1994	Batman: The Animated Series	Goliath	Voice, episode: "Sideshow"
1994	Bump in the Night	Big Mike	Voice, episode: "Baby Jail"
1994	The Bears Who Saved Christmas	Black Bart	Voice
1994	Bobby's World	Anthony, Anthony's Dad	Voice, episode: "Rebel Without a Clue"
1995	The Twisted Tales of Felix the Cat	Fufu Gauche	Voice, episode: "The Earth Heist/Attack of the Tacky"
1995	The Pursuit of Happiness	Alex Chosek	7 episodes
1995	The Shnookums & Meat Funny Cartoon Show	Commissioner Stress, Wrongo, Super Water Buffalo, Shirley Pimple, Santa Claus, Additional voices	Main role
1995	What a Cartoon!	Harley	Voice, episode: "Hard Luck Duck"
1995	Dumb and Dumber	Stump, Cop	Voice, episode: "Dixie Dolts"
1995	Fantastic Four	Hydro-Man	Voice, episode: "Inhumans Saga: Part 1: And the Wind Cries Medusa"
1995–1996	Timon & Pumbaa	Boss Beaver	Voice, 5 episodes
1996	Lois & Clark: The New Adventures of Superman	Reverend Bob	Episode: "I Now Pronounce You..."
1996	Mad About You	The Nurse	Episode: "The Sample"
1996	Seinfeld	Tony	Episode: "The Bottle Deposit"
1996	Tales from the Crypt	Drinky	Voice, episode: "The Third Pig"
1996	The Tick	Jim Rage	Voice, episode: "That Mustache Feeling"
1996	Earthworm Jim	The Lord of Nightmares	Voice, episode: "Evil in Love"
1996	Quack Pack	Beef Jerky	Voice, episode: "Ducks by Nature"
1996	Project G.e.e.K.e.R.	Noah	Voice, 5 episodes
1996	The Spooktacular New Adventures of Casper	Fatso	Voice, 22 episodes
1996–1997	Mighty Ducks	Grin Hardwing	Voice, main role
1996–1999	Superman: The Animated Series	Lobo, Bibbo Bibbowski	Voice, recurring role (10 episodes)
1996	Dexter's Laboratory	Magmanamus, Driver, Man No. 1	Voice, episode: "Magmanamus"
1996–2005	Everybody Loves Raymond	Robert Barone	Awards: Primetime Emmy Award for Outstanding Supporting Actor in a Comedy Series (2002, 2003 & 2005); Screen Actors Guild Award for Outstanding Performance by an Ensemble in a Comedy Series (2003); Nominations: Primetime Emmy Award for Outstanding Supporting Actor in a Comedy Series (2000, 2004); Prism Award for Performance in a TV Comedy Series (2006); Screen Actors Guild Award for Outstanding Performance by a Male Actor in a Comedy Series (2004); Screen Actors Guild Award for Outstanding Performance by an Ensemble in a Comedy Series (1999, 2000, 2002, 2004–06); Television Critics Association Award for Individual Achievement in Comedy (2003); TV Guide Award for Supporting Actor of the Year in a Comedy Series (2001); Viewers for Quality Television Award for Best Supporting Actor in a Quality Comedy Series (1997–2000)
1997	Don King: Only in America	Assassin	TV film
1997	101 Dalmatians: The Series	Buttons	Voice, episode: "Shake, Rattle and Woof/Cadpig Behind Bars"
1997	One Saturday Morning	Jelly Roll the Elephant	Voice
1997	Nightmare Ned	Ed	Voice, main role
1998	Murphy Brown	SWAT Team Captain	Episode: "Wee Small Hours"
1998	The King of Queens	Robert Barone	Episode: "Road Rayge"
1998	Voltron: The Third Dimension	Bull Max No. 7	Voice, episode: "A Rift in the Force"
1998	Mad Jack the Pirate	Darsh the Dragon, Biclops, Frank Sinatra	Voice, 13 episodes
1998	Toonsylvania	Phil	Voice, main role
1998–1999	Hercules	Midas Guards, Otus, Orthrus (mohawk head), Gegenees	Voice, 5 episodes
1999	Mickey Mouse Works	Muncey, additional voices	3 episodes
2000	Buzz Lightyear of Star Command	Torque	Voice, 5 episodes
2001	Club Land	Lou Montana	Television film
2001	Bleacher Bums	Marvin	Television film
2001–2002	House of Mouse	Muncey, additional voices	3 episodes
2002	Kim Possible	Big Mike	Voice, episode: "Tick-Tick-Tick"
2002	Gleason	Jackie Gleason	Television film; Nominations: Primetime Emmy Award for Outstanding Lead Actor in a Miniseries or Movie; Screen Actors Guild Award for Outstanding Performance by a Male Actor in a Television Movie or Miniseries
2002	Ozzy & Drix	Ernst Strepfinger	Voice, 2 episodes
2002	Robbie the Reindeer	Prancer, Viking No. 3	Voice, English dub
2002	Bear in the Big Blue House	Small Possum	Voice, episode: "Welcome to Woodland Valley"
2003	Justice League	Lobo	Voice, episode: "Hereafter"
2006–2007	Eloise: The Animated Series	Diamond Jim Johnson	Voice, 4 episodes
2006–2010	'Til Death	Eddie Stark	82 episodes; also producer (23 episodes), executive producer (40 episodes) and supervising producer (19 episodes)
2008	Monk	"Honest" Jake Phillips	Episode: "Mr. Monk Buys a House"
2009	Comedy Central Roast of Joan Rivers	Himself / Roaster	Special
2010	Glory Daze	Jerry Harrington	2 episodes
2010	Special Agent Oso	Professor Buffo	Voice, 2 episodes
2010	Kathy Griffin: My Life on the D-List	Himself	1 Episode, "Getting My House in Order"
2011	I Kid with Brad Garrett	Himself	5 episodes; also executive producer
2013	How to Live with Your Parents (For the Rest of Your Life)	Max Green	13 episodes
2013–2014	The Crazy Ones	Gordon Lewis	6 episodes
2014	Writers Guild Awards	Himself / Host	Special
2015	Fargo	Joe Bulo	5 episodes
2015	Manhattan	Eli Isaacs	Episode: "Human Error"
2016	Law & Order: Special Victims Unit	Gary Munson	2 episodes
2016	This Is Us	Wes Manning	Episode: "The Big Three"
2017	Bull	Ron Getman	Episode: "The Illusion of Control"
2017	The Get	Bill	Television film
2017	Michael Jackson's Halloween	Bubbles	Voice, television film
2018–2019	Rapunzel's Tangled Adventure	Fish Monger, Hook Hand	Voice, 2 episodes
2018	I'm Dying Up Here	Roy Martin	9 episodes
2018–2020	Single Parents	Douglas Fogerty	45 episodes
2020	Penny Dreadful: City of Angels	Benny Berman	3 episodes
2020–2021	To Tell the Truth	Himself	5 episodes
2021	Big Shot		Creator and executive producer
2021–2022	Kamp Koral: SpongeBob's Under Years	The Kraken	Voice, 2 episodes
2021	Hell's Kitchen	Himself	Episode: "A Game Show from Hell"
2021	Bubble Guppies	Tall Punyan	Voice, episode: "A Giant Harvest Day!"
2021	Amphibia	Robert Otto	Voice, episode: "Spider-Sprig"
2023	SpongeBob SquarePants	The Kraken	Voice, episode: "Abandon Twits"
2023	High Desert	Bruce	Main role
2024	Not Dead Yet	Duncan Rhodes	Main role (season 2)
2024	WondLa	Otto	Voice, main role
2024	Bookie	Brad	Episode: "Mahnanga"
TBA	Hidden Heroes: A Descendants Story	Ord	Voice, television film

=== Video games ===
Year	Title	Role	Notes
1995	Disney's Animated Storybook: Winnie the Pooh and the Honey Tree	Eeyore	
1996	Casper Brainy Book	Fatso	
1997	Ready to Read with Pooh	Eeyore	
1997	Fallout	Harry	
1998	A Bug's Life	Dim	
2000	Sacrifice	James	
2000	Buzz Lightyear of Star Command	Torque	
2003	Finding Nemo	Bloat	
2007	Ratatouille	Auguste Gusteau	
2014	Puzzle Charms	Additional voices	

=== Theme parks ===
Year	Title	Role	Notes
2007	Finding Nemo Submarine Voyage	Bloat	
