= Bizaardvark =

American comedy television series

- Genre: Comedy
- Created by: Kyle Stegina & Josh Lehrman
- Starring: Madison Hu; Olivia Rodrigo; Jake Paul; DeVore Ledridge; Ethan Wacker; Maxwell Simkins; Elie Samouhi
- Theme music composer: Matthew Tishler; Josh Lehrman; Kyle Stegina
- Opening theme: "Let's Go Make Some Videos" by Olivia Rodrigo and Madison Hu
- Composer: Scott Clausen
- Country of origin: United States
- Original language: English
- No. of seasons: 3
- No. of episodes: 63 (list of episodes)

Production
- Executive producers: Eric Friedman; Ron Rappaport
- Producers: Jason Shubb; Justin Varava
- Camera setup: Multi-camera
- Running time: 21–24 minutes
- Production company: It's a Laugh Productions

Original release
- Network: Disney Channel
- Release: June 24, 2016 – April 13, 2019

Bizaardvark is an American comedy television series created by Kyle Stegina and Josh Lehrman that premiered on Disney Channel on June 24, 2016. The series ran for three seasons consisting of 63 episodes, airing its final episode on April 13, 2019. The series stars Madison Hu, Olivia Rodrigo, Jake Paul, DeVore Ledridge, Ethan Wacker, Maxwell Simkins, and Elie Samouhi. In addition to the series' regular episodes, the series has aired shorts under the title of Bizaardvark Shorts.

== Premise ==
Frankie Wong and Paige Olvera are two teenage best friends who post funny songs and comedic videos on the Internet. After hitting 10,000 subscribers on their Vuuugle channel Bizaardvark, a portmanteau of the words "bizarre" and "aardvark", they are accepted into the Vuuugle studios, where they make their videos while also having to share them with other "Vuuuglers". In the third season, Frankie and Paige are among the Vuuuglers who attend the Vuuugle house in Malibu, where they, along with Amelia and Bernie, meet Zane and Rodney, two new Vuuuglers.

== Episodes ==
Season	Episodes	Originally released	
Season	Episodes	First released	Last released
1	20	June 24, 2016	January 27, 2017
2	22	June 23, 2017	April 13, 2018
3	21	July 24, 2018	April 13, 2019

== Cast and characters ==
=== Main ===
- Madison Hu as Frankie Wong, one star of Bizaardvark who plays the keyboard and piano
- Olivia Rodrigo as Paige Olvera, the other star of Bizaardvark who plays the guitar
- Jake Paul as Dirk Mann (seasons 1–2), the star of "Dare Me Bro", where he takes dare requests that he performs
- DeVore Ledridge as Amelia Duckworth, the star of "Perfect Perfection with Amelia" which details about fashion and self-help tips for girls. By the third season, Amelia changes the name of her series to Imperfect Imperfection in light of her little sister Willow coming to live with her.
- Ethan Wacker as Bernie Schotz, a friend of Frankie and Paige who becomes their agent. He also becomes friends with Dirk and develops a crush on Amelia.
- Maxwell Simkins as Zane (season 3), a new Vuuugle star, Rodney's best friend, and the star of "Zane Unboxed", where he tells stories associated with his unboxing of items
- Elie Samouhi as Rodney (season 3) a new Vuuugle star, Zane's best friend, and the star of "What's in M'Hair?", where he pulls out different things that are found in his hair

=== Recurring ===
- Johnathan McClain as Liam, the son of Vuuugle's creator who speaks to the Vuuuglers through a robotic TV screen
- Ellen Ratner as Grandma, the grandmother of Bernie who lives with her and has done a lot of odd jobs in her life
- Maya Jade Frank as Belissa (seasons 1–2), a superfan of Bizaardvark who is the webmaster of the fansite "I Heart Vark"
- Adam Haas Hunter as Viking Guy (seasons 2–3), a tall Viking who is the star of Vuuugle's "Live Like a Viking" Channel
- Rachna Khatau as Principal Karen (seasons 2–3), the principal of Sierra High School seeking the approval of students who later becomes a fan of Bizaardvark like Belissa did
- Kevin Will as Coach Carlson (seasons 2–3), the gym teacher at Sierra High School
- Caitlin Reagan as Willow (season 3), Amelia's younger sister who has developed an earth child lifestyle where she becomes a vegan with the exception of nachos, does yoga forms, likes Earth Day, and boycotted Halloween due to cruelty to pumpkins
- David Lengel as Lou Scoopmaker (season 3), a news reporter who hosts Malibu's news segment "Lou Scoopmaker's Hot Scoop" and interacts with the Vuuuglers

Ross Kobelak has also appeared as Horse Face Guy, a fellow Vuugle star who always wears a black horse head mask and never talks, since the beginning of the series.

== Production ==
The series was created by Kyle Stegina and Josh Lehrman, who were discovered by the Disney Channel Storytellers program. They serve as the series' co-executive producers. Eric Friedman and Ron Rappaport serve as executive producers, with Eric Friedman as showrunner. Marc Warren, who previously supervised Disney Channel Storytellers, was the executive producer on the pilot. The series started shooting in early 2016. On December 15, 2016, Disney Channel renewed the series for a second season. On July 22, 2017, it was announced that Jake Paul would be leaving both Bizaardvark and Disney Channel. On April 19, 2018, Disney Channel publicized that a previously unannounced third season would premiere in summer 2018. On May 30, 2018, it was announced that Maxwell Simkins and Elie Samouhi had joined the series' cast, portraying tween bloggers Zane and Rodney, respectively.

== Broadcast ==
The series premiered in both the United States and Canada following the premiere of Adventures in Babysitting on Disney Channel and Disney Channel Canada, respectively, on June 24, 2016. The first season concluded on January 27, 2017. The second season premiered on June 23, 2017, and concluded on April 13, 2018. The third season premiered on July 24, 2018, and concluded on April 13, 2019.

== Reception ==
=== Critical reception ===
Owen Gleiberman of Variety stated that the series manages to be innovative for being a quirky and surreal satirical sitcom, while claiming that Madison Hu and Olivia Rodrigo skillfully manage to capture precociousness through their characters with irony. Emily Ashby of Common Sense Media rated the series 3 out of 5 stars, complimented the depiction of positive messages, such as friendship and acceptance, and praised the presence of role models, stating that Hu and Rodrigo's characters portray perseverance and teamwork.

=== Ratings ===
Viewership and ratings per season of Bizaardvark
Season	Episodes	First aired		Last aired		Avg. viewers (millions)
Season	Episodes	Date	Viewers (millions)	Date	Viewers (millions)	Avg. viewers (millions)
1	20	June 24, 2016	2.41	January 27, 2017	0.99	1.27
2	22	June 23, 2017	1.49	April 13, 2018	0.97	1.11
3	21	July 24, 2018	0.76	April 13, 2019	0.55	0.57
