= Madison Hu =

American actress (born 2002)

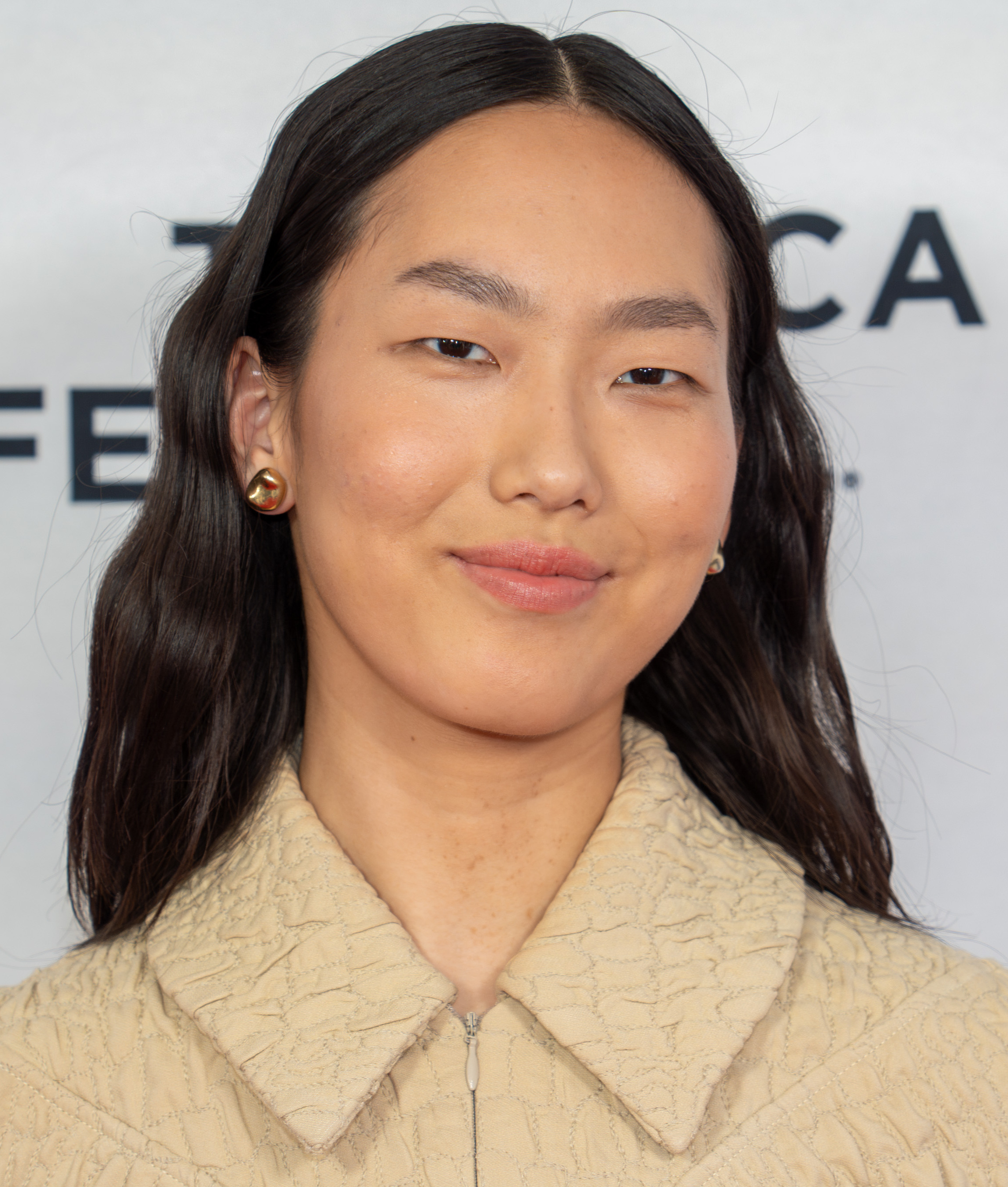
- Hu in 2025
- Born: June 2, 2002 (age 24); Longview, Texas, U.S.
- Education: Columbia University (BA)
- Occupation: Actress
- Years active: 2008–present

Madison Hu (born June 2, 2002) is an American actress. After her film debut in 2013's Bad Words and a recurring role in Disney Channel's Best Friends Whenever (2015–2016), she achieved recognition with her breakthrough co-leading role as Frankie Wong in Bizaardvark (2016–2019).

Hu has since acted in films including the horror The Boogeyman (2023) and independent projects Night Shift (2024), Rosemead (2025), and Sparks (2026). She also appeared in the television series The Brothers Sun (2024), A Man on the Inside (2025), and miniseries Rooster (2026).

== Early life ==
Hu was born in Longview, Texas, the daughter of Chinese immigrants. She has an older brother who was born in China. Hu moved to Southern California, where she started to work as an actress.

== Career ==
Hu started her career as a child actress. By about age six, Hu already had a manager in the entertainment industry. Hu's first notable role was on the Disney Channel series Best Friends Whenever, playing the recurring character Marci. She was later cast in the leading role as Frankie in the Disney Channel series Bizaardvark.

Following her role on Bizaardvark, it was announced that she had been cast in the science fiction film Voyagers; the film was released in April 2021. She appeared in two 2023 horror films, Night Shift and The Boogeyman.

== Personal life ==
Hu and Olivia Rodrigo met while auditioning for Bizaardvark, and struck up an instant friendship that translated into landing the co-lead roles of best friends on the series – which they continue to be in real life. She appeared in the music video for Olivia’s song “Bad Idea Right?”.

Hu graduated from Columbia University in 2024 with a bachelor's degree in creative writing.

== Filmography ==
=== Film ===
| Year | Title | Role | Notes | Ref. |
|---|---|---|---|---|
| 2013 | Bad Words | Ling Quan | | |
| 2020 | Remnants of the Fallen | Chelsea Nevins | | |
| 2021 | Voyagers | Anda | | |
| 2023 | The Boogeyman | Bethany | | |
| 2023 | Night Shift | Alice Marsh | | |
| 2025 | Rosemead | Jeannie | | |
| 2026 | Sparks | Odette | | |

=== Television ===
| Year | Title | Role | Notes | Ref. |
|---|---|---|---|---|
| 2011 | I Kid with Brad Garrett | Herself | Episode 1.2 | |
| 2014 | The Goldbergs | Debbie | Episode: "Mama Drama" | |
| 2014 | Tosh.0 | Katie | Episode 6.28 | |
| 2015–2016 | Best Friends Whenever | Marci | Recurring role (season 1) | |
| 2015 | Grace and Frankie | Spelling Bee Girl | Episode: "The Spelling Bee" | |
| 2015 | The Kicks | Kara | Episode: Pilot | |
| 2016–2019 | Bizaardvark | Frankie | Main role | |
| 2022 | Robot Chicken | Stella / Kayla | Voice role; episode: "May Cause Weebles to Fall Down" | |
| 2024 | The Brothers Sun | Grace | Recurring role | |
| 2025 | A Man on the Inside | Claire Chung | Recurring role (season 2) | |
| 2026 | Rooster | Eva | Recurring role | |
| 2026 | Avatar: The Last Airbender | Fei | Episode: "A Fight, Once Begun" | |
| 2026 | The Altruists | Constance Wang | Miniseries | |

=== Music videos ===
| Year | Title | Artist(s) | Director | Ref. |
|---|---|---|---|---|
| 2023 | "Bad Idea Right?" | Olivia Rodrigo | Petra Collins | |

== Accolades ==
| Award | Year | Category | Work | Result | Ref. |
|---|---|---|---|---|---|
| Legacy Awards | 2018 | Best Children's Comedy Female Artist | Bizaardvark | Nominated | |
