= Rachna Khatau =

American actress

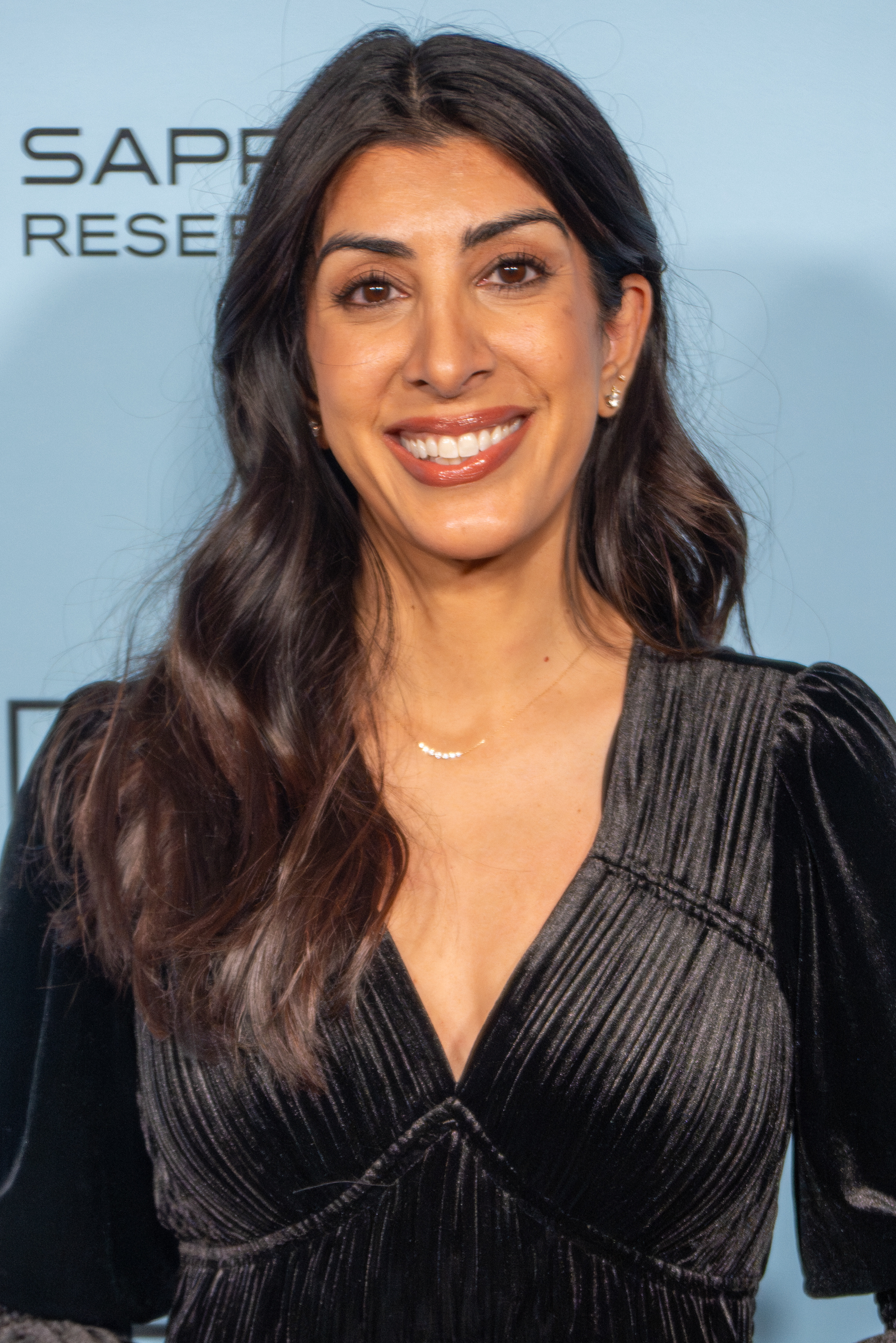
- Khatau at the 2025 Sundance Film Festival
- Education: University of Southern California
- Occupations: Actress, singer, television host, writer
- Years active: 2006–present

Rachna Khatau is a British-American television and stage actress, singer, writer and television host. She is notable for her role as Sondra in the Freeform sitcom Baby Daddy appearing in the series from 2013 through 2017.

== Early life ==
Rachna Khatau was raised in Chicago, Illinois. She received a master's degree in journalism at the University of Southern California.

== Career ==
Rachna has appeared in numerous premium shows at The Second City Hollywood. As a singer, Rachna was previously signed to a record deal with a subsidiary label of Universal Records. She has hosted live shows and worked as a red carpet correspondent for Extra.

Her early works included starring in low-budget independent films such as Heather (2006),Turbo (2009) and Embarrassing Facebook Girl (2011).

Rachna had a recurring role in the sitcom Baby Daddy portraying Sondra, the over zealous neighbor. She appeared in the series from 2013 until the series finale in 2017. Since then, she has appeared in recurring guest star roles in Disney's Bizaardvark as Principal Karen and in Nickelodeon's Game Shakers as Pam Chowdree.

Rachna has starred in plays at the East West Players theatre in Los Angeles appearing in the farcical comedy Washer/Dryer and A Nice Indian Boy.

== Personal life ==
Rachna regularly volunteers with The Art of Elysium, performing for kids with intellectual disabilities, and Laughter for a Change, playing improv games with the patients and families at Children's Hospital Los Angeles.

== Filmography ==
- Heather (2006)
- Foreign Body (2008)
- Turbo (2009)
- The Second City This Week (2011)
- Embarrassing Facebook Girl (2011)
- Practical Condolences (2011)
- Hufflepuff Boyz (2011)
- Days of Our Lives (2012)
- Baby Daddy (2013–2017)
- Father(s) Day (2016)
- Bizaardvark (2017–2019)
- Game Shakers (2017)
- Downward Dog (2017)
- The Villains of Valley View (2022)
- Raven's Home (2023)
