= I Kid with Brad Garrett =

- Starring: Brad Garrett
- Country of origin: United States
- Original language: English
- No. of seasons: 1
- No. of episodes: 12

Production
- Running time: 23 minutes

Original release
- Network: TLC
- Release: June 28 – August 2, 2011

I Kid with Brad Garrett is an American TV show starring Brad Garrett.

The show premiered on Tuesday June 28, 2011 and ran for 12 episodes. The host Garrett gets children's responses to odd questions and situations.
