= List of Bunk'd episodes =

Bunk'd is an American comedy television series created by Pamela Eells O'Connell that aired on Disney Channel from July 31, 2015 to August 2, 2024. The series is a spinoff of Jessie and includes returning stars Peyton List, Karan Brar, and Skai Jackson. Starring alongside them is Miranda May.

== Series overview ==
Season	Episodes	Originally released	
Season	Episodes	First released	Last released
1	21	July 31, 2015	May 20, 2016
2	21	August 23, 2016	May 24, 2017
3	16	June 18, 2018	September 21, 2018
4	30	June 20, 2019	July 24, 2020
5	21	January 15, 2021	August 6, 2021
6	30	June 10, 2022	May 21, 2023
7	22	July 23, 2023	August 2, 2024

== Episodes ==
=== Season 1 (2015–16) ===
No. overall	No. in season	Title	Directed by	Written by	Original release date	Prod. code	U.S. viewers (millions)
1	1	"Welcome to Camp Kikiwaka"	Bob Koherr	Pamela Eells O'Connell	July 31, 2015	101	4.24
Emma, Ravi, and Zuri Ross leave the loud and noisy streets of New York to visit Camp Kikiwaka, which is the same camp where their parents met. While Ravi and Zuri meet Jorge and Tiffany, Emma befriends Lou and develops an interest in Xander while competing against Hazel. Due to Hazel's trick where Emma and Zuri end up in the woods, Xander drags Lou, Ravi, Jorge, Tiffany, and Hazel to get to them while being stalked by the Kikiwaka. Guest stars: Mary Scheer as Gladys, Tessa Netting as Hazel Note: According to Zuri, the reason why Luke is not at camp is because he is in summer school after failing English class.
2	2	"Gone Girl"	Rich Correll	Jeff Hodsden & Tim Pollock	August 7, 2015	102	2.12
Xander finally asks Emma on a date. Due to Ravi's misinterpreted encounters overhearing Lou and Xander's conversation about the date to a murder plot, Emma becomes wary of Xander's motives. Meanwhile, Zuri and Jorge begin an underground candy business after Gladys banned it due to being stood up by the candy delivery man Serge. Unfortunately, Tiffany ends up getting hooked on candy. Guest star: Mary Scheer as Gladys
3	3	"Camp Rules"	Bob Koherr	Mike Montesano & Ted Zizik	August 14, 2015	104	1.80
Following the black market candy sales and the Woodchuck Cabin almost catching on fire, Gladys reinstates the laws established by Camp Kikiwaka's founder Jedediah Swearengen. She assigns the counselors-in-training to give out demerits to anyone committing illegal actions where three demerits will get that camper punished. Emma and Zuri have been arguing lately with an issue with the bathroom nearly causing the Woodchuck Cabin to burn to the ground. Due to Lou's canoe therapy going wrong, Emma and Zuri get trapped out on the lake and start to drift toward the rapids causing Lou and Xander to go rescue them only for them to be needing rescue. Meanwhile, Ravi keeps busting Jorge for his lawbreaking which leads to Jorge stealing the original rules and both of them getting into trouble with Gladys. Guest star: Mary Scheer as Gladys Absent: Nina Lu as Tiffany
4	4	"Smells Like Camp Spirit"	Rich Correll	Lacey Dyer & Julie Layton	August 21, 2015	105	2.18
It is "spirit week" at Camp Kikiwaka and Emma is chosen to be the spirit stick guardian but Emma soon loses the stick due to her giving it to Xander as a gift. This results the whole camp being cursed with bad luck and Zuri having a case of zits on her face. Everyone must race against time to find the stick and fix everything. Elsewhere, in order to become a full CIT, Ravi must learn how to pass his swim test, so he enlists Jorge and Tiffany to help him. Guest star: Tessa Netting as Hazel
5	5	"The Ones That Got Away"	Bob Koherr	Valerie Ahern & Eric Schaar	November 6, 2015	103	1.82
Emma and Xander team up for a fishing competition, but end up finding out that they have nothing in common, and end up becoming just friends.. Meanwhile, Gladys chases the chef Murphy and is very desperate while Lou and Ravi try to find a large fish. Zuri and Tiffany get caught cheating by stuffing a fake fish, losing their title at the contest and getting disqualified. Lou realizes that the search is more important than the result, and lets the large fish go. Guest stars: Mary Scheer as Gladys, Casey Campbell as Murphy Absent: Nathan Arenas as Jorge
6	6	"Can You Hear Me Now"	Bob Koherr	Sally Lapiduss	November 13, 2015	106	1.79
All of the campers are forced to hand in their phones, but Zuri swaps her phone with a rock and keeps it so that she can order some deli food. In search for a signal, she and Emma trick Ravi and Tiffany into building a router, saying that Gladys wanted a secret art project to commence. They lie when asked about it, and when Lou finds out, she is very hurt and stops talking to Emma. Meanwhile, Grizzly Cabin is entrusted with designing the camp totem pole, and Xander gets very controlling, which upsets Jorge and causes him to quit. Later, Xander and Jorge reconcile and Jorge gets to use his design for the pole. Then Emma and Lou also reconcile when Emma destroys the pole, among other things. Guest star: Tessa Netting as Hazel
7	7	"Friending with the Enemy"	Rich Correll	Adam Lapidus	November 20, 2015	107	1.64
Emma tries to convince Lou to become friends with Hazel but they get more than they bargained for when Hazel wears out their friendship. When Hazel finds out that Emma and Lou were bribing her friendship with camp luxuries, she seeks revenge. Meanwhile, Zuri becomes inspired when the host of her favorite TV show For Realzzz Dr. Hunter Brody unexpectedly shows up at Camp Kikiwaka so she follows him on a quest to seek the Kikiwaka. Ravi and Tiffany uncover the Kikiwaka first and witnessed it going into the camp. Guest stars: Tessa Netting as Hazel, Myko Olivier as Dr. Hunter Brody Absent: Kevin Quinn as Xander, Nathan Arenas as Jorge
8	8	"Waka, Waka, Waka!"	Victor Gonzalez	Valerie Ahern & Eric Schaar	November 27, 2015	108	1.73
The Camp Kikiwaka Festival occurs as Emma, Lou, and Hazel compete in their sales to become the Kikiwaka Queen since Xander is dressed as the Camp Kikiwaka mascot and is also the Kikiwaka King. Xander wants Emma and Lou to outsell Hazel to evade dancing with her at the end of the festival. Meanwhile, Ravi and Tiffany try to gain proof of the Kikiwaka's existence following their close encounter with the Kikiwaka. At the same time, Zuri cuts a deal with Gladys to use the students to make Kikiwaka dolls in exchange that she uses Gladys' shower. Guest stars: Mary Scheer as Gladys, Tessa Netting as Hazel
9	9	"Secret Santa"	Lauren Breiting	Jeff Hodsden & Tim Pollock	December 4, 2015	114	1.50
After getting lost due to Xander's poor sense of direction, Zuri, Xander, Tiffany, and Jorge discover a cabin up in the mountains. They meet an old man and ask for directions; he gives them directions, but in a rude manner as he doesn't appear to like children and wants them to go away. As they're leaving, Jorge rushes back in because he really has to use the bathroom. When he takes a wrong turn on the way back out, he discovers that the old man is Santa. Meanwhile, Emma and Lou want to get each other nice gifts to show each other how much their friendship means, but after listening to bad advice from Ravi, they both try to get each other something other than what they were originally going to get. Emma tries to capture a woodchuck while Lou puts on an embarrassing show for Emma. Meanwhile, upon later returning, the old man denies Jorge's allegations that he's Santa, but later admits that he used to be Santa. He stopped being him because children nowadays can just get their toys or whatever they want online and he no longer felt special. Feeling bad, Zuri, Xander, Tiffany, and Jorge decorate his cabin, which Santa appreciates when he returns. Later, after discovering what happened, Emma and Lou discuss that it's the thought that counts, not the gift. Guest star: Harrison White as Old Man
10	10	"Counselors' Night Off"	Bob Koherr	Mike Montesano & Ted Zizik	January 8, 2016	110	1.48
Lou and Xander are excited when they get to go to their first annual "Counselors' Night Off" at Camp Kikiwaka's The Spot and so is Emma but she soon finds out that she can't go because she is not a counselor so she is stuck at the camp helping Ravi babysit the younger campers. Emma is eager to find out about Xander and Hazel's fate on being a couple when Emma comes to a realization that she likes Xander and is ready to date him so he sneaks out to the spot to find out Xander's true feelings. Lou and Hazel make a bet to see if Emma or Hazel would be the better girl to date Xander and loser has to scrub fungus on of the campers' feet. When Xander finds out that he likes Emma, the two begin to date making Hazel lose the bet. Back at the camp, Ravi is having a hard time handing the campers while Emma is gone so he seeks help from Zuri. Guest star: Tessa Netting as Hazel Absent: Nina Lu as Tiffany
11	11	"There's No Place Like Camp"	Bob Koherr	Pamela Eells O'Connell	January 22, 2016	111	1.86
Jorge feels homesick for his family as Xander and Ravi work to break his homesickness. After breaking the oven and microwave while on kitchen duty, the girls forage for food in the woods where Lou accidentally covers herself in Diablo Leaves which causes her to hallucinate. Gladys uses a website where she finds a possible love interest in a "Nigerian Prince" and prepares to meet him despite Lou's warnings about it being a scam. Guest star: Mary Scheer as Gladys
12	12	"Luke's Back"	Rich Correll	Pamela Eells O'Connell	February 12, 2016	119	1.88
Luke pays a visit to Camp Kikiwaka after finishing summer school. Meanwhile, campers from Camp Kikiwaka's rival Camp Champion led by Eric want to claim the "Spot" resulting in a turf war between the two camps. Special guest star: Cameron Boyce as Luke Guest stars: Tessa Netting as Hazel, Spencer List as Eric Absent: Nina Lu as Tiffany
13	13	"No Escape"	Rich Correll	Jeff Hodsden & Tim Pollock	February 19, 2016	112	1.62
During a camp safety exercise taught by Emma and Xander, Ravi unknowingly saves Tiffany from a fall and Tiffany develops a crush on him. To avoid hurting Tiffany's feelings, Ravi makes up a lie and says that he already has a girlfriend but the lie becomes too much for Ravi to handle. Zuri and Jorge sneak off to town to buy stuff from the general store so Emma and Xander try to get them back before Gladys notice their whereabouts, but they encounter weird surprises along the way. Guest stars: Mary Scheer as Gladys, Andrew Caldwell as Ted
14	14	"Close Encounters of the Camp Kind"	Bob Koherr	Lacey Dyer & Julia Layton	March 11, 2016	116	1.50
Jorge, Tiffany and Zuri suspect that a new camper is an alien when they see a UFO land in the lake and Zuri instantly develops a crush on him so she tries to prove to Jorge and Tiffany wrong. Emma and Ravi's friendship with Lou and Xander are tested when Emma and Ravi are given poor performances on their CIT evaluations. Guest stars: Mary Scheer as Gladys, Amarr Wooten as Marsh
15	15	"Crafted and Shafted"	Bob Koherr	Mike Montesano & Ted Zizik	March 18, 2016	117	1.37
Emma and Xander take Zuri, Jorge, and Tiffany on a camping trip in the woods. Emma and Xander are upset that they have not had time to spend together as a couple. That night, they go into the forest to be alone while collecting firewood, but they fall into a hole leading into an abandoned mineshaft. After Zuri and Tiffany get trapped in the mine as well, Jorge rescues them by throwing down a tree that they use as a ladder. Meanwhile, Ravi and Lou assemble a jungle gym that Gladys purchased from a discount store. They must put it together so a photographer can photograph it on the following day for the new camp brochure. Lou wants to assemble the gym using her own knowledge, while Ravi insists on using the instruction manual, although he has difficulty understanding it because it is written in Swedish. Lou and Ravi agree to work on separate parts of the gym using their own methods, but they are both unsuccessful. Ravi is surprised to learn that Lou can make sense of the instructions, and they decide to work together to finish the gym. The completed gym collapses after the photographer arrives, and Lou blames Ravi for not tightening the screws enough.
16	16	"Boo Boos and Birthdays"	Phill Lewis	Lacey Dyer & Julia Layton	March 25, 2016	109	1.63
Emma, Zuri and Lou decide to throw a surprise birthday party for Tiffany after learning that she has never had one. However, Zuri worries that Tiffany may not like her party because it is being planned by Emma and Lou, whose party ideas do not reflect Tiffany's interests. Emma and Lou set up the party in the forest, but they realize they have forgotten to invite any guests. Before Zuri can bring Tiffany to the party site, it is wrecked by a bear and a moose, forcing the children to flee back to the camp. At their cabin, Zuri has arranged for Tiffany's favorite quartet to play for her. Despite the failed party, Tiffany says she is happy that someone bothered to try throwing her a party. Meanwhile, Jorge hurts his ankle during a practice volleyball game with Ravi and Xander, and is sent to stay in the infirmary cabin. Ravi discovers that Jorge is faking his injury so he can enjoy the infirmary, which has air conditioning, television, and snacks. Ravi later decides to fake an injury so he can also enjoy the amenities. Xander visits the boys and says that the volleyball tournament will be cancelled because his team is short by one player. Ravi and Jorge reveal that they are okay, and the volleyball tournament goes on as planned, with Xander's team winning. Guest star: Tessa Netting as Hazel
17	17	"For Love and Money"	Shannon Flynn	Adam Lapidus	April 1, 2016	113	1.47
Emma, Zuri and Lou are sent by Gladys to go into town to pick up some bug spray for her. While at the store, Emma and Zuri meet a young carpenter named Noah, whom they set up with Lou. When they notice Lou is only doing woodworking for Noah on their dates, Emma and Zuri discover he is only using Lou after they hear him on his cell phone. Meanwhile, Xander plays a joke on Ravi and Jorge by misleading them about hidden treasure at the camp. Ravi and Jorge later turn the tables and Xander gets fooled about the treasure. Guest star: Chandler Massey as Noah Absent: Nina Lu as Tiffany
18	18	"Love Is for the Birds"	A. Laura James	Pamela Eells O'Connell	April 8, 2016	120	1.40
Ravi meets another camper named Sasha and needs Emma and Jorge's help to talk to her. They start dating, but Ravi quickly discovers he and Sasha have nothing in common. Despite this, he takes part in adventures, enduring many injuries in doing so. Their being completely opposite eventually results in their break-up. Meanwhile, Zuri and Tiffany find a Tawny eagle egg while bird-watching and try to tend to it, only for Lou to catch them. Instead of taking the egg to a wildlife officer as Lou directs them, Zuri and Tiffany take the egg back to its nest. Realizing how high they have climbed the tree the nest is in, they're afraid to go back down and are more so when the mother shows up. Lou catches them again, but the three witness a miracle as the egg hatches in the presence of its mother. Special guest star: Kelly Washington as Sasha Absent: Kevin Quinn as Xander
19	19	"Bride and Doom"	Robbie Countryman	Desiree Bowie & Amanda Steinhoff	April 29, 2016	121	1.48
A long time ago, Jedediah Swearengen's daughter Olga was in love with a man named Roland and her father disapproved of their romance. When Olga tried to run away to be with Roland, she was caught in a storm and perished. It is said in the Camp Kikiwaka ghost stories that when it comes to a stormy night, the Ghost of Olga Swearengen would haunt the camp. When there is a sighting of the Ghost of Olga Swearengen, Emma, Zuri, Ravi, Lou, Xander, Jorge, Tiffany, and Hazel must survive the night. Guest star: Tessa Netting as Hazel
20	20	"Live from Camp Kikiwaka"	Rich Correll	Valerie Ahern & Eric Schaar	May 13, 2016	115	1.29
Gladys announces that Camp Kikiwaka will not reopen next summer because of the low amount of camper applications. The children decide to make a live webcast to promote the camp to try to save it from closing. Lou believes that the webcast should focus on Camp Kikiwaka traditions; she feels left out when Xander and Emma decide that it will focus instead on the sports played at the camp. Lou makes several failed suggestions for Xander and Emma to reconsider focusing on camp traditions instead. Meanwhile, Zuri plans to do stand-up comedy for the webcast, while Tiffany plans to play her violin, although they both disagree with each other's idea. Ravi directs the webcast, while Lou declines to participate in it. The webcast does not go as planned due to Gladys auctioning various items, which disrupts the children's attempt to promote the camp. Later, the video camera is inadvertently left on and records Lou reconciling with Emma and Xander. Tiffany admits to Zuri that she likes her stand-up comedy, and Zuri admits that playing the violin could help bring in new camp applicants. However, they both discover that they have missed the webcast. Gladys announces that Camp Kikiwaka will reopen next summer as it now has 300 new applicants, who enjoyed the friendship expressed by Emma, Lou and Xander during the unintended portion of the webcast. Guest star: Mary Scheer as Gladys Absent: Nathan Arenas as Jorge
21	21	"Xander Says Goodbye"	Bob Koherr	Adam Lapidus	May 20, 2016	118	1.25
When Xander starts receiving phone calls at camp, Emma is concerned that he may be cheating on her. It turns out Xander needs to leave camp early to begin football practice at his high school, and his father, Gerald, is picking him up to take him home. Lou and Ravi do some training with Xander before he reveals to them and Emma that football does not make him happy and that he is doing this only to please his father. Emma, Lou and Ravi devise a plan so Xander can stand up to his father, which fails. Emma then makes Gerald see that Xander does not like football, which leads Gerald and Xander to talk more about it and allows Xander to stay at camp. Meanwhile, Zuri and Tiffany are accusing each other of taking their stuff—Zuri's tablet and Tiffany's violin, but Gladys reveals that she confiscated them because electronics are against camp rules, while Tiffany’s playing has resulted in noise complaints. While the girls attempt to recover their stuff in Gladys' cabin, they see something really disturbing regarding Morgan and Christina, so Zuri blackmails Gladys into giving back their stuff. Guest stars: Mary Scheer as Gladys, Larry Poindexter as Gerald Absent: Nathan Arenas as Jorge

=== Season 2 (2016–17) ===
No. overall	No. in season	Title	Directed by	Written by	Original release date	Prod. code	U.S. viewers (millions)
22	1	"A Bad Case of the Weasels" "Griff Is in the House!"	Bob Koherr	Pamela Eells O'Connell	August 23, 2016	201	1.35
For their second summer at Camp Kikiwaka, Emma, Zuri, and Tiffany find that Hazel has transferred into Cabin Woodchuck due to latest campers in Cabin Weasel led by Lydia and has Lou reassigned to them where they give Lou a hard time. As a result, Hazel starts making things difficult for Emma, Zuri, and Tiffany causing them to find a way to get Hazel to go back to Cabin Weasel. Meanwhile, Ravi, Xander, and Jorge get a new cabin inhabitant named Griff who is attending as part of his juvenile hall's Nature Rehabilitation Program. When Xander's guitar goes missing, Xander and Ravi blame Griff and arrange for Camp Kikiwaka's Trial by Fire. Special guest star: Kevin Chamberlin as Bertram Guest stars: Tessa Netting as Hazel, Lincoln Melcher as Griff, Lily Mae Silverstein as Lydia
23	2	"Hey Jealousy" "Dance in My Pants"	Bob Koherr	Valerie Ahern & Eric Schaar	August 24, 2016	202	1.19
While working with Ravi in preparing for the Camp Kikiwaka Ball, Emma learns that there was more to Xander and Lou's long friendship when they used to date when they were young. She soon starts to feel jealous when she catches them in a situation where she thinks that they are falling in love again. Meanwhile, Zuri and Tiffany plan to ask Griff out to the dance. While talking about him, they are unaware they are being overheard by Jorge who thinks that they are planning to ask him out. Guest star: Lincoln Melcher as Griff
24	3	"Feel the Barn" "Zuri Had a Little Lamb"	Bob Koherr	Lacey Dyer & Julia Layton	August 25, 2016	203	1.44
Emma, Lou, and Zuri are assigned to handle Camp Kikiwaka's farm where Lou gets displeased on how Emma and Zuri cleaned the farm. When a sheep named Sheila escapes, Emma and Zuri must get it back to camp before Lou finds out. Meanwhile, Ravi, Jorge, and Griff discover Gladys' secret sauna and end up getting trapped in it when strong winds knock the tree in front of its doors. Guest star: Lincoln Melcher as Griff Absent: Kevin Quinn as Xander, Nina Lu as Tiffany
25	4	"Weasel Out" "Zuri Weasels Out"	Phill Lewis	Sally Lapiduss	August 26, 2016	205	1.54
Zuri has been jealous at the fact that counselors and CITs can do what they want at night. She is approached by Hazel and is given an opportunity to be a CIT at Cabin Weasel where Lydia and the other campers there give her a hard time. Meanwhile, Ravi is enlisted by Gladys to oversee the art auction at Camp Kikiwaka which all of Moose Rump, Maine will attend as Jorge and Griff plan to get out of painting by quoting that the colt Wildfire can paint upon being inspired by Ravi's claim of an Indian elephant once painting a picture. Guest stars: Tessa Netting as Hazel, Lincoln Melcher as Griff, Lily Mae Silverstein as Lydia Absent: Kevin Quinn as Xander
26	5	"Queen of Screams"	Robbie Countryman	Mike Montesano & Ted Zizik	September 16, 2016	207	1.32
Jorge wins a contest to meet horror writer Stephanie Queen and brings Zuri, Lou, and Tiffany along where they end up trapped in her "Riddle Room" causing them to find a way out before the deadline is up. Meanwhile, Xander gets caught up in an argument with Emma and Ravi when they argue over the birdhouse designs. Guest star: Paula Rhodes as Stephanie Queen
27	6	"Luke Out Below"	Robbie Countryman	Adam Lapidus	September 30, 2016	206	1.50
Luke returns at the time when Emma and Ravi are teaching Zuri and Griff about safety. To prove that he is responsible, he brings Zuri and Griff on a hiking expedition to a mountain that overlooks Camp Kikiwaka which doesn't go well. Meanwhile, Lou, Xander, and Hazel flashback to when they first met and how Hazel started to try to get Xander to like her. Special guest star: Cameron Boyce as Luke Ross Guest stars: Tessa Netting as Hazel, Lincoln Melcher as Griff, Taylor Autumn Bertman as Little Hazel, Emma Shannon as Little Lou, Mason Patrick Mahay as Little Xander Absent: Nathan Arenas as Jorge, Nina Lu as Tiffany
28	7	"Camp Kiki-Slasher"	Rich Correll	Mike Montesano & Ted Zizik	October 7, 2016	204	2.00
One night after watching a horror film, Jorge leaps out from behind a chair and frightens Zuri and Tiffany. The next day, Jorge, Tiffany and Zuri go into the forest to search for fire wood. Jorge flees after they spot a masked person in the forest. When Tiffany and Zuri do not return to the camp, the other children are convinced that the girls are pranking Jorge because he scared them the previous night. The children eventually decide to search for Tiffany and Zuri, but they gradually disappear too after they each encounter the masked individual. They learn that the masked person is Timmy, a boy who was removed from Camp Kikiwaka by Gladys. The children plan to scare Gladys as revenge for Timmy's removal. Lou, Xander and Timmy pose as masked killers while Zuri, Jorge, Emma, Tiffany and Ravi stage their own deaths, all of which scares Gladys enough to make her faint. Guest stars: Mary Scheer as Gladys, Casey Campbell as Murphy, Nate Stone as Timmy
29	8	"Treehouse of Terror"	Bob Koherr	Lacey Dyer & Julia Layton	October 28, 2016	209	0.92
Zuri, Tiffany and Jorge discover an old treehouse and decide to fix it up and make it their own hangout. They allow Lydia to help out after she convinces them that she will not take over the treehouse when it is finished. When the repairs are complete, Lydia has the Weasel Cabin campers take over the treehouse to use as their own hangout. Zuri, Tiffany, and Jorge trick the Weasels into believing that they have a new hangout at a nearby cave. While the Weasels leave the treehouse in search of the cave, Zuri, Tiffany and Jorge reclaim the treehouse. Lydia returns and the treehouse becomes unstable because of too much weight. After the three children escape unharmed, they rescue Lydia by having her jump onto a blanket they are holding. Meanwhile, Ravi and Xander trick Emma and Lou into believing that they are poor players at billiards. After losing, the boys challenge Emma and Lou to a rematch, with the losing team having to dress as chickens. Ravi and Xander unveil their true skills during the rematch, but still lose after Ravi messes up his final shot. Guest star: Lily Mae Silverstein as Lydia
30	9	"Tidal Wave"	Bob Koherr	Jeff Hodsden & Tim Pollock	November 4, 2016	208	1.33
Emma becomes upset at Xander when she tells him how much he means to her and he merely replies "Thanks." Meanwhile, Zuri plans to have Xander star in a music video that she will then upload to her ChatSnap account to gain more followers. However, Xander is unable to focus on the video after he realizes Emma is upset at him, but he does not like discussing his feelings. Zuri locks them in a freezer until they can become happy again, although they manage to escape. Zuri realizes that the solution is to have Xander describe his feelings for Emma in a song. Xander sings his song as part of the music video, which Zuri then uploads to her account, while Emma forgives Xander. Meanwhile, Lou and Ravi secretly write letters to Griff to make him think that a girl from a neighboring camp likes him. Lou and Ravi intervene when Griff decides to steal a bicycle to give to the girl. Griff tells them that he was pranking them as he knew the letters were fake, having recognized Ravi's handwriting. Guest star: Lincoln Melcher as Griff Absent: Nina Lu as Tiffany
31	10	"Fog'd In"	Rich Correll	Jeff Hodsden & Tim Pollock	November 11, 2016	212	1.30
Fog develops at Camp Kikiwaka, and Tiffany discovers that it contains domoic acid, a debilitating neurotoxin caused by the algae in the nearby lake. The fog affects several people in different ways: Emma develops memory problems, Ravi's personality is altered, Jorge believes he is a parrot, Zuri becomes extremely happy, and Murphy develops indecisiveness. It is then revealed to Lou and Xander that the domoic acid was a prank to scare them. However, the group learns from a radio broadcast that the fog contains a parasite, which subsequently infects Jorge and other campers, making them violent and dangerous. It is then revealed that these events were actually a campfire story being told by Jorge. Guest star: Casey Campbell as Murphy
32	11	"How the Griff Stole Christmas"	Shannon Flynn	Valerie Ahern & Eric Schaar	December 2, 2016	211	1.24
The camp is having a gift-making event in which the campers create toys for children who cannot afford them at Christmas time. The event is disrupted by Griff when he creates a miniature robot with a sawblade that destroys a stuffed animal and Lou's gingerbread house. Griff continues to misbehave, and Ravi and Lou make several attempts to learn why he is upset. Griff eventually reveals that Christmas reminds him of his time in juvenile detention, where visitation time was increased during Christmas time; despite this, no one came to visit him. Although it is summer time, the children set up a Christmas tree and give Griff presents so he can have a good Christmas memory. Meanwhile, Emma makes a "found art" necklace for Xander that is made of miscellaneous items. Although Xander dislikes the necklace, Ravi convinces him to lie to Emma and say that he likes her gift, although he eventually tells her the truth, which she accepts. Meanwhile, Santa Claus has a non-flying reindeer named Harold. Santa travels to an animal sanctuary in Miami to find a home for Harold, and he leaves Tiffany, Zuri and Jorge in charge of watching the reindeer; the children eventually teach Harold how to fly. Guest stars: Lincoln Melcher as Griff, Harrison White as Santa
33	12	"Food Fight"	Ben Dejesus	Adam Lapidus	February 24, 2017	217	1.18
The children complain about Murphy's cooking, so he challenges them to prepare dinner for the entire camp to prove that they can make better food than him. The children accept Murphy's challenge, and Zuri decides to split the children into two competing teams and make a video about their competition, with the hope that the video will become viral. The teams consist of Ravi and Xander against Emma and Lou, while Zuri and Jorge host the competition. The teams are given low-quality ingredients, including moldy meat and hoofs, to prepare their meals. Ravi and Lou learn that their teammates cannot cook; Xander and Emma instead decorate their team's side of the camp mess hall as part of the competition. Emma decorates her side of the hall to resemble a five-star restaurant, while Xander decorates his side like a barn. Lou feels that Xander's decorations go well with her barbecue meal, while Ravi believes that his Haute meal would go better with Emma's upscale theme. The teams change their members, with Xander and Lou against Emma and Ravi. Murphy and the campers declare that both teams' meals are bad, and the two teams realize that his job is not easy. Zuri is disappointed that her video does not become viral. Guest star: Casey Campbell as Murphy Absent: Nina Lu as Tiffany
34	13	"Mother May I?"	Robbie Countryman	Jeff Hodsden & Tim Pollock	March 3, 2017	210	1.18
Christina Ross arrives at Camp Kikiwaka upon the yacht that she and Morgan own being in the area. Lou is pleased that her Camp Kikiwaka idol is here and starts hanging out with her. When this becomes a problem to Emma, she competes against Lou in a Camp Kikiwaka event with Gladys whom Christina barely remembers. Meanwhile, Ravi, Xander, Jorge, and Griff get stuck on a malfunctioning ski lift during their hiking trip. Guest stars: Christina Moore as Christina, Lincoln Melcher as Griff, Mary Scheer as Gladys
35	14	"Mud Fight"	Rich Correll	Valerie Ahern & Eric Schaar	March 17, 2017	216	1.11
While hiking, Zuri, Jorge and Tiffany discover a trail of mud that they want to play in, but Ravi forbids them. Later, Zuri, Jorge and Tiffany sneak back to the mud trail to play around in it, but they develop itchiness caused by poison oak that was in the mud. They attempt to hide their itchiness from Ravi, but eventually confess. Meanwhile, Lou is tired of dating non-masculine boys. She joins Emma and Xander on their date at an old lighthouse, where they meet Bronson, the great-grandson of the original lighthouse keeper. Bronson is viewed by Emma and Lou as manly, which makes Xander jealous. Lou and Bronson become attracted to each other. When the group discovers a ship heading toward rocks, the girls work to get the lighthouse working so they can warn the ship. Lou and Emma realize that Bronson is sexist after he tells them to let the males get the lighthouse operational. After saving the ship, Lou decides that she does not want to have a relationship with Bronson because of his old-fashioned views toward females. Guest star: James Gaisford as Tucker/Bronson
36	15	"Dog Days of Summer"	Bob Koherr	Monica Contreras	March 24, 2017	214	1.18
When Lou hears that her pet dog has died, she plans to take a leave from Camp Kikiwaka to attend her dog's funeral. Emma, Zuri, and Xander keep Lou from leaving when they make her realize how much they need her. A puppy arrives at the Woodchuck Cabin and Lou takes it in as her new pet, which she names Chuck. Meanwhile, Hazel finds common ground with Ravi and Tiffany over a role-playing game. Guest star: Tessa Netting as Hazel Absent: Nathan Arenas as Jorge
37	16	"Bad Dog!"	Robbie Countryman	Pamela Eells O'Connell	March 31, 2017	215	1.11
The Woodchuck Cabin becomes upset when Chuck tears up their belongings and relieves himself in their cabin. Lou attempts to train Chuck, but she is unsuccessful. Lou and Chuck sleep outside the cabin one night after the other campers get mad at them, and Lou discovers the next morning that Chuck has run away. Lou and the other campers search for Chuck in the forest; when they find him, they realize he is a wolf looking for his pack. Lou allows Chuck to continue roaming free in the wilderness where he belongs, but he later returns, so the Woodchuck Cabin builds him an outdoor doghouse so he can visit. Meanwhile, Jorge is upset that everyone else has a plaque for a record that they achieved. Jorge challenges Griff to a bean bag toss competition, but is upset when he discovers that Ravi asked Griff to let him win. Jorge plays against Griff fairly, but the game is tied. However, Jorge still receives a plaque. Guest stars: Lincoln Melcher as Griff, Nate Stone as Timmy Absent: Kevin Quinn as Xander
38	17	"Camp Stinky Waka"	Lauren Breiting	Mike Montesano & Ted Zizik	April 7, 2017	218	0.84
Tiffany is worried when she discovers that her mother, Dr. Sharon Chen, is coming to visit to check on her progress, as she had told her mother that Camp Kikiwaka was a camp for geniuses. Emma, Lou, and Zuri work to make themselves seem smart to Dr. Chen in order to impress her. When Dr. Chen discovers the truth, she decides to take Tiffany out of Camp Kikiwaka. When the children help Dr. Chen realize how it feels to have fun, she decides to let Tiffany stay. Meanwhile, a skunk has been causing problems for Xander, Jorge, and Griff by constantly spraying them. It soon spreads to the other campers and Hazel is unable to obtain help from Moose Rump to help them deal with the skunk. Guest stars: Tessa Netting as Hazel, Lincoln Melcher as Griff, Nina Millin as Dr. Sharon Chen Absent: Karan Brar as Ravi Ross
39	18	"Cabin vs. Cabin"	Bob Koherr	Lacey Dyer & Julia Layton	April 14, 2017	219	0.93
The three cabins compete against each other in an annual series of competitions. Lou convinces Emma to gain intelligence regarding the Grizzly Cabin's plans to win each competition, which will help the Woodchuck Cabin beat them. Emma agrees, but Xander – unaware of the Woodchuck Cabin's plot – convinces her to give him information on how to beat the Woodchucks, stating that she deserves a boyfriend who is a winner. Emma provides both teams with information about the other. Meanwhile, Ravi and Jorge compete against Tiffany and Zuri in a separate competition where they dress up as their cabin's mascot animal for bonus points. When Hazel discovers that Emma is cheating for both teams, she blackmails Emma by threatening to reveal the secret unless she provides information about the other teams, allowing the Weasel Cabin to win. During the final competition, a race between the three cabins, Emma confesses that she has been working for all three teams, all of which are disqualified. Gladys wins the prize of a canoe, as there are no other teams to accept it. Guest stars: Mary Scheer as Gladys, Tessa Netting as Hazel, Lily Mae Silverstein as Lydia
40	19	"Dreams Come True"	Bob Koherr	Pamela Eells O'Connell	April 21, 2017	220	0.96
Lou has a dream that Emma is being chased in the woods and ends with her being attacked. Emma and Zuri have noted that some of Lou's earlier dreams have partially come true. Meanwhile, Griff states to Ravi, Xander, and Jorge that due to his juvenile hall being full, he will be placed in a family home. Complications arrive when a county worker named Mr. Gribbly arrives to bring Griff back to juvenile hall upon an inmate's escape leaving an opening available. Now Ravi, Xander, and Jorge must keep Mr. Gribbly from finding Griff. Guest stars: Lincoln Melcher as Griff, Jason Boegh as Gribbly
41	20	"We Didn't Start the Fire"	Rich Correll	Teleplay by : Sally Lapiduss; Story by : Brittany Assaly & Jason Hauser	April 28, 2017	221	1.18
Gladys has Lou and Xander oversee the test to see if Emma and Ravi are going to be worthy of being promoted to counselors. Even though Emma and Ravi have a hard time, they use their abilities when a sudden fire breaks out that burns Woodchuck Cabin and Grizzly Cabin. Meanwhile, Zuri, Jorge, Tiffany, and Griff go on a camp out near the graveyard where Jedediah Swearengen is buried. Guest stars: Mary Scheer as Gladys, Tessa Netting as Hazel, Lincoln Melcher as Griff
42	21	"The Great Escape"	Rich Correll	Adam Lapidus	May 24, 2017	213	0.99
Ravi and Tiffany try to get campers to sign up for a wildlife hike, but only Jorge is interested. They become lost on their hike and reach the Canadian/U.S. border, which is overseen by two border guards: Marie Poutine on the Canadian side and Cosmo Dibble on the U.S. side. Dibble declines to let the children re-enter the United States without identification. The children learn that Poutine and Dibble used to be in a relationship, until she kept forgetting the various anniversary dates that he devised. The children help the border guards revive their relationship by having them agree to a single anniversary date. For helping their relationship, the children are allowed to re-enter the U.S. Meanwhile, Griff and Zuri begin a relationship, but Emma and Xander believe they are a bad influence for one another and attempt to keep them apart. When Zuri and Griff cannot be found, Xander, Emma and Lou search for them, believing that they went to a country music festival. After getting lost in the woods, Xander, Emma and Lou return to the camp and discover that Griff and Zuri never left. Xander and Emma decide to let the two be together. Later, Lou takes Griff and Zuri to the music festival. When their bus breaks down, Lou takes them on a shortcut through the woods, but they become lost and wind up at the Canadian border. Guest stars: Lincoln Melcher as Griff, Tate Hanyok as Marie Poutine, Sean Whalen as Cosmo Dibble

=== Season 3 (2018) ===
No. overall	No. in season	Title	Directed by	Written by	Original release date	Prod. code	U.S. viewers (millions)
43	1	"We Can't Bear It!"	Bob Koherr	Pamela Eells O'Connell & Adam Lapidus	June 18, 2018	301	0.97
Emma, Ravi, Zuri and Lou return to Camp Kikiwaka with a bus of campers, including Destiny, a frequent beauty pageant winner; Matteo, a cautious boy who is easily scared; and Finn, Lou's second cousin who does not care about personal hygiene. Emma, Ravi, Zuri and Lou are upset to learn that Gladys never had the cabins rebuilt following the fire. They learn that Gladys left Moose Rump after taking the insurance check as well as the summer deposits for each camper. Because it is late, the group spends the night at the camp, sleeping in tents. The next day, the group departs on the bus, but they accidentally leave Destiny, Matteo and Finn behind. The three children encounter a bear before the group returns and saves them by scaring the animal away. Emma, Ravi, Zuri and Lou are upset to leave the camp forever, until the Ross children convince their mother to purchase the camp for them so they can repair and improve it. Guest star: Nate Stone as Timmy
44	2	"Let's Bounce!"	Bob Koherr	Mike Montesano & Ted Zizik	June 19, 2018	302	0.93
While Camp Kikiwaka is being repaired, Emma, Ravi and Zuri cannot agree on which of them should be in charge of the camp. Lou casts a tie-breaking vote for Emma to be in charge, but she becomes upset when Emma proposes new changes to the camp, including a bouncy house on the lake that was previously used for fishing. Meanwhile, Zuri is upset at Emma for allowing Destiny to decorate the girls' new cabin herself. In the boys' new cabin, Finn and Matteo begin breaking each other's stuff after they become annoyed with one another, and Ravi is disappointed when he sees the mess they have made. Later, Finn, Matteo and Destiny discover the bouncy house on the lake and begin using it, but the house drifts away from the dock. Finn, Matteo and Destiny escape the bouncy house before it goes over a waterfall, and Emma realizes she went too far with her ideas to improve the camp. Finn and Matteo clean up the mess in their cabin, while Zuri and Destiny finish decorating their cabin together.
45	3	"Take the Cake"	Jon Rosenbaum	Valerie Ahern & Eric Schaar	June 20, 2018	303	0.85
Emma, Ravi, Zuri and Lou are unprepared when Inspector Dinsmore, from the Department of Camp Services, arrives at Camp Kikiwaka for a surprise inspection. Dinsmore, a former camper who disliked spending summers at the camp, finds multiple safety violations and threatens to close the camp if she finds one more safety hazard. Meanwhile, the camp is preparing to hold an annual party in the mess hall that includes the campers giving speeches on what they like most about the camp. However, Finn decides not to give a speech because of a fear of public speaking. In the mess hall, Emma unknowingly applies expired frosting to a cake which is then served to the campers. When Ravi realizes the mistake, he and the others try to retrieve each piece of cake before consumption. Meanwhile, Matteo and Destiny stage a fake fight, hoping to get the speeches cancelled so Finn will not have to speak. As Dinsmore is about to eat a piece of the cake, Ravi rushes to retrieve it and knocks her over, after which she declares that the camp will be closed. Finn pleads for Dinsmore to reconsider her decision, and explains to her what he likes about the camp. After Dinsmore learns how much Finn likes his camp friends, she decides to give the camp another month to fix the safety hazards. Matteo and Destiny help Finn realize that he saved the camp and conquered his fear of public speaking by explaining what he likes about the camp. Guest star: Lisa Linke as Inspector Dinsmore
46	4	"O Sister, Where Art Thou?"	Jon Rosenbaum	Jeff Hodsden & Tim Pollock	June 21, 2018	304	1.01
Emma and Destiny realize they have a lot in common, and the two begin spending time together, which makes Zuri jealous. Zuri tells Lou how she feels about Emma spending time with Destiny, but she asks Lou not to reveal her feelings to Emma. Eventually, Emma learns that Zuri is upset and convinces her that she does not like Destiny more than her. Meanwhile, Ravi hypnotizes Matteo so he will participate in camp activities and no longer be fearful to leave the boys' cabin. However, when Ravi and Finn see Matteo climbing a zip-lining tower without a safety line, they rush over to end his hypnotic state. On the zip-lining tower, Matteo insists on using the zip-line despite that there is no one at the other platform to catch him. Ravi eventually ends Matteo's hypnosis and then zip-lines to the next platform so he can catch Matteo.
47	5	"Cav'd In"	Bob Koherr	Skander Halim & Gina Ippolito	June 22, 2018	305	0.97
Lou leads the Woodchuck Cabin on a cave exploration, but they retreat when they encounter bats. Meanwhile, Ravi is tired of Finn and Matteo getting into trouble, so he installs cameras around the camp to monitor them. Destiny later realizes that during the cave exploration, she left behind her stuffed animal horse, which she keeps secret from the other campers due to embarrassment. That night while the campers are asleep, Destiny tries to sneak out and search for the horse, but she is caught by Zuri. Destiny reveals the truth to Zuri, who decides to help her in her search. They find the horse inside the cave, but are then unable to find the way out. The next morning, Emma and Lou use Ravi's surveillance system to determine the whereabouts of Zuri and Destiny. Emma and Lou locate the girls inside the cave, and Destiny reveals her secret stuffed animal as the reason for sneaking out the night before. The girls then encounter a wild animal in the cave who turns out to be Lou's pet wolf, Chuck. They also meet a baby wolf in the cave who becomes interested in Destiny's horse toy. Destiny decides that she no longer needs the horse to make her feel safe, so she lets the baby wolf keep the toy. Meanwhile, Finn and Matteo retreat to the forest to evade Ravi's surveillance system, but they are attacked by bees. Finn and Matteo agree to stay out of trouble, and Ravi agrees to remove his surveillance system.
48	6	"By All Memes"	Bob Koherr	Prathi Srinivasan & Joshua Levy	June 25, 2018	306	0.85
Following suggestions from the campers, Emma ends a camp ban on cell phones. Zuri accidentally falls onto a recently painted bench and becomes covered in paint, an event that is recorded by the campers' cell phones. Her fall becomes an Internet meme that goes viral, and she becomes obsessed with maintaining her new followers. Zuri searches the Internet for new viral video ideas and creates live streams, leaving no time for her camp duties, which upsets Emma. Meanwhile, Ravi and Lou learn that Murphy has become a chef at Camp Champion, and they agree to his challenge of creating meals to compete for the most Internet "likes." Murphy creates a life-sized butter sculpture of himself, while Ravi and Lou create a tower of seafood. When applying a food item to the tower, Ravi falls and knocks over the tower, and Lou's recording of the incident goes viral, earning them more "likes" than Murphy's butter sculpture. Meanwhile, Finn takes separate selfie pictures with Destiny and Matteo, both of whom become jealous when they see the images online. Finn questions Matteo and Destiny about their jealousy; he learns that prior to camp, Destiny did not have many friends and Matteo was frequently left out of activities. Finn convinces them that they are all best friends, and Emma chooses to reinstate the cell phone ban so the campers can enjoy the camp rather than become obsessed with their phones. Guest star: Casey Campbell as Murphy
49	7	"A Whole Lotta Lobsta"	Phill Lewis	Pamela Eells O'Connell	June 29, 2018	307	0.92
Camp Kikiwaka is preparing to have its annual lobster festival. When Finn disrupts preparations for the festival, Emma puts Zuri in charge of watching him to keep him out of trouble. Together, they work on Finn's giant papier-mâché lobster known as Lobzilla. Zuri and Finn have fun spending time together until Finn learns that Zuri is his babysitter, but she convinces him that she genuinely had fun with him. Meanwhile, Destiny and Matteo rescue the lobsters that were going to be cooked by Ravi for the festival. They replace the real lobsters with fake ones and place the real lobsters into the lake, but Ravi learns what they have done and informs them that the lobsters will die in fresh water. Ravi, Destiny, and Matteo rescue the lobsters, and Ravi is convinced to let the lobsters live, choosing instead to make lobster-shaped tofu, which is not well received by the campers. Meanwhile, Emma and Lou realize they did not book the Lobster Brothers musical duo as live entertainment for the festival, so they dress up in lobster costumes and masquerade as the Lobster Brothers. The campers are not impressed with Emma and Lou's performance, but they enjoy Finn's Lobzilla once it makes an appearance.
50	8	"No Bones About It"	Lauren Breiting	Valerie Ahern & Eric Schaar	July 2, 2018	308	0.73
Finn finds animal bones in the forest and believes he has discovered a new species that is part cow, part duck, and part pig. Matteo is initially skeptical, but he later helps Finn set up a cage trap in the forest, hoping to capture a living version of the animal. Meanwhile, Ravi begins serving meat-less meals to the campers, hoping to encourage healthier diets. In the camp library, Destiny finds an old book outlining an initiation that Woodchuck Cabin members must go through to become official Woodchucks. At Destiny's request, Emma, Lou and Zuri agree to put her through the initiation process. The initiation leads the Woodchucks to the forest, where they become trapped in the cage set up by Finn and Matteo. Destiny winds up completing the final task in the initiation process by helping her fellow Woodchucks, which she does by picking the cage lock and freeing the group. Ravi, Finn and Matteo go into the forest and find the Woodchuck campers, who reveal that Zuri has been secretly eating Chinese take-out food in the forest to avoid Ravi's health food. The boys learn that the animal bones Finn discovered were actually from the Chinese food.
51	9	"Finders Keepers, Lou's a Weeper"	Karan Brar	Adam Lapidus	July 6, 2018	309	0.85
The campers plan a surprise celebration for Lou's tenth anniversary of being at Camp Kikiwaka. Destiny, Finn and Matteo try repairing an old truck in the forest that Lou likes, but they discover it needs a new engine. An old man, Gerald Barker, finds the truck and tells the children about Babyface Munson, a gangster who used the truck as a getaway vehicle for robberies in the 1930s. During a bank robbery, Munson and his gang drove the truck into the forest to evade police, but the engine stopped working and Munson's two gang members abandoned him, leading to his capture. Barker reveals that he is Munson and has returned for the money after being in prison. Munson believes the children took the money, and he insists they return it. Meanwhile, Lou overhears a discussion between Emma, Ravi and Zuri, and she mistakenly believes that they plan to fire her. Lou quits the camp but is followed by Emma, Ravi and Zuri. They find Munson and the others, and Munson realizes his former gang members must have retrieved the money after his capture, as they are now among the richest people in town. Destiny, Finn and Matteo convince the others that Munson, who has no friends or family, is a nice man who does not need to be arrested. At the party, the children give Lou a toy truck as a gift, due to difficulty in repairing the real truck. Guest star: Robert Towers as Gerald Barker
52	10	"Reversal of Fortune"	Robbie Countryman	Mike Montesano & Ted Zizik	July 9, 2018	310	0.77
Emma, Lou, Ravi and Zuri decide to create a garden to grow vegetables for the campers. While retrieving gardening supplies from an old storage shed, they discover a fortune teller machine and decide to install it in the mess hall. Finn begins acting abnormal after he receives a letter from his parents, but he declines to tell Matteo and Destiny what was written in the letter. Finn goes to the fortune teller machine for advice and is told that his problem will be solved if he does something "outrageous". Items start disappearing from the camp, including food and the vegetables from the garden, and Destiny and Matteo later learn that Finn has set up a campsite in the forest using the missing items. Finn reveals that he and his parents will be moving at the end of the summer; as he does not want to lose his hometown friends, he followed the fortune teller machine's advice by stealing items to set up his own campsite. Finn returns the items, and Lou, Destiny and Matteo convince him that he will make new friends once his family moves.
53	11	"Game of Totems"	Peyton List	Adam Lapidus	July 13, 2018	311	0.77
The camp holds its annual Kikiwaka Cup game, in which the campers and counselors form two opposing teams and strategize to steal each other's totem. Zuri leads the camper team, while Lou leads the counselors, with Ravi as the referee. Finn and Destiny are disqualified for cheating and are forced by Ravi to stay in the camp office. Matteo is later sent to the office after throwing a dodgeball at Ravi. Matteo reveals that he intentionally got himself taken out of the game because he believes he is too small to play, but Ravi later agrees to give the three a second chance in the game. Meanwhile, in the forest, Emma is tagged by a camper and must wait for one of her teammates to tag her so she can resume the game, but she is left waiting all night. Lou and Zuri make a bet: if the counselors win, then Lou gets a scarf that Zuri cherishes, and if the campers win, then Zuri gets Lou's lucky pig foot. Because of his small size and quick moves, Matteo is able to retrieve the counselors' totem and win the game for the campers. Zuri then disposes of Lou's pig foot in a fire, as she was tired of its odor smelling up the Woodchuck cabin. Guest stars: Lily Mae Silverstein as Lydia, Dawson Fletcher as Oscar
54	12	"Toilets and Tiaras"	Bob Koherr	Jeff Hodsden & Tim Pollock	July 16, 2018	312	0.75
Destiny and a friendly new camper named Janice compete in a Camp Kikiwaka beauty pageant hosted by Zuri and Emma. During the question-and-answer portion of the pageant, Janice shouts words of encouragement to Destiny, which causes her to lose concentration. Destiny believes that Janice, like previous pageant competitors, is using mind games to sabotage her chances of winning. Destiny sabotages Janice during the pageant's talent competition, but is later convinced by Lou that Janice really is a friendly girl. Destiny apologizes to Janice and the two befriend each other. Meanwhile, Matteo creates a robot named Otis to clean up after Finn, but Otis malfunctions and subsequently becomes jealous when Matteo wants to spend time with Finn. Later, Ravi and Finn try to shut down Otis, who locks them in their cabin bathroom. After learning of the situation, Matteo shuts down Otis and rescues Ravi and Finn. Guest star: Abigail Dylan Harrison as Janice
55	13	"Bungle in the Jungle"	Bob Koherr	Pamela Eells O'Connell	July 20, 2018	313	0.73
Lou is accepted into a college, where she plans to study to become a teacher. Lou's mother, Dixie, visits the camp and becomes upset when she learns that Lou does not intend to take over the family farm like the previous eight generations of the family. After a fight with Lou, Dixie decides to leave the camp early. However, when Dixie sees how much Lou enjoys working with the camp children, she accepts Lou's decision to become a teacher. Meanwhile, Destiny, Finn and Matteo get transported into a jungle adventure board game. To win the game and escape the jungle, they must find a man named Safari Jim and rescue him from various wild animals. Destiny wakes up and realizes that the time spent in the jungle was only a dream. Guest star: Beth Curry as Dixie
56	14	"Gruel and Unusual Punishment"	Bob Koherr	Teleplay by : Mike Montesano & Ted Zizik; Story by : Valerie Ahern & Eric Schaar	July 27, 2018	314	0.63
Camp Kikiwaka commemorates the Moose Rump flood of 1668, in which hundreds of people drowned. When Finn drops a box of evidence from an old Moose Rump witch trial, it unleashes fumes that cause him, Destiny and Matteo to be transported to 17th century Moose Rump, where they are indentured servants forced to work. Finn's job is to hunt animals, but he shows a fondness for them. Destiny's job is to create clothes in a dress shop, but she tries to update the women's clothing to be more colorful. Matteo's job is to prepare food, but he goes against the traditional recipe to make the food flavorful. The children's behavior, considered odd and non-traditional for the time period, leads the town constable to suspect that they are witches. The children learn that the Moose Rump flood is imminent and they try to warn the town, but they are placed on trial for allegedly being witches. The children are found guilty, but they succeed in getting the town to evacuate. Finn, Destiny and Matteo then wake up at Camp Kikiwaka, where Ravi suggests that the compounds of the witch trial box had become fermented, causing the children to hallucinate. Guest star: Bertrand-Xavier Corbi as Bartholomew
57	15	"It's a Blast!"	Bob Koherr	Teleplay by : Jeff Hodsden & Tim Pollock; Story by : Valerie Ahern & Eric Schaar	August 3, 2018	315	0.71
Emma receives a package from her grandmother: a diamond ring that has been in the family for 100 years. Camp Kikiwaka holds a model rocket competition, divided into several different rounds, including the safety round in which contestants must safely land their rockets while protecting a fragile egg as cargo. Zuri and Destiny take Emma's bubble-wrapped ring and attach it to their rocket, thinking it is actually a bubble-wrapped egg. When Destiny and Zuri realize they launched Emma's ring with the rocket, they begin a search for it in the forest, but Emma eventually finds the ring and learns that Destiny and Zuri were responsible for losing it. Meanwhile, Finn is concerned that his rocket will not fly, so Ravi secretly attaches a second booster to it. Finn's rocket ends up flying the highest during the altitude round, beating Matteo's rocket for first place. Ravi then secretly alters Matteo's rocket for the speed round to help him win against Finn's rocket, but Matteo's rocket instead explodes. Matteo, who aspires to be a rocket scientist, is surprised and upset that he keeps losing to Finn, until Ravi reveals the truth. Guest star: Meryl Hathaway as Barnabia
58	16	"Up, Up and Away"	Bob Koherr	Pamela Eells O'Connell & Adam Lapidus	September 21, 2018	316	0.65
During the last week of summer, Emma accepts a job as a Milan supermodel for her mother's fashion line and Zuri decides to be an intern at her father's film studio, while Ravi has been accepted into a scientific fellowship. Because none of them will be able to return to Camp Kikiwaka the following summer, their parents state that the camp must be sold. Emma, Zuri and Ravi are reluctant to tell Lou about the camp sale as it will upset her. Because Lou has always wanted to ride in a hot air balloon, they decide to take her on one so she will be in a good mood when they tell her the news. Although Lou is initially upset, she decides that the others should follow their dreams. Later, Emma, Zuri and Ravi agree to sell the camp to Lou. Meanwhile, Destiny, Finn and Matteo discover a caged baby Kikiwaka and free it, later learning that a scientist, Dr. Blackburn, had captured it for research. The children name the animal Doug and shave him to blend in with the campers. Blackburn captures Doug again but he escapes his cage, and his mother arrives to scare off Blackburn. The Kikiwakas then retreat into the forest. Guest stars: Annie Sertich as Dr. Blackburn, Owen Atlas as Doug

=== Season 4 (2019–20) ===
No. overall	No. in season	Title	Directed by	Written by	Original release date	Prod. code	U.S. viewers (millions)
59	1	"Who da Boss? Lou da Boss!"	Trevor Kirschner	Erin Dunlap & Phil Baker	June 20, 2019	401	0.68
Lou, Finn, Matteo, and Destiny return to Camp Kikiwaka for a new summer. In the Grizzly Cabin, Finn and Matteo receive a new camp counselor: an actor named Noah. In the Woodchuck Cabin, Destiny is joined by a new fellow camper, Gwen, a girl who has lived her whole life without electricity. Their counselor is Ava, a city girl. As the new camp owner and director, Lou is hesitant to take on her new responsibilities out of fear that she will fail, especially now that Emma, Ravi, and Zuri are not around to help her. Meanwhile, Finn and Matteo miss having Ravi as their counselor, and are annoyed by Noah and his acting exercises. Overhearing this, Noah decides to run away from the camp, prompting Lou to organize a search party. Noah is located, and Lou convinces him that he will become a better counselor in time. Noah and his campers reconcile and hope to get along. Ava convinces Lou that she can handle her new responsibilities after helping her realize how well she handled Noah's situation.
60	2	"Kikiwaka's Got Talent"	Trevor Kirschner	Valerie Ahern & Eric Schaar	June 27, 2019	402	0.57
Camp Kikiwaka is holding a talent show, and Lou names Noah as the show director. Although Destiny is accepted into the show on her first try, she keeps auditioning for Noah because she thinks he is not really impressed by her pageant dancing. Later, Destiny reveals to Noah that performing is not her favorite part of pageantry and that it puts pressure on her to impress people. Destiny prefers the charitable activities of pageantry, and she decides not to participate in the talent show. Elsewhere, Ava has had trouble sleeping lately and is too tired to help Lou with the talent show. Meanwhile, Finn and Matteo are planning to rehearse a ventriloquist act for the show, but Finn is upset when Matteo starts spending most of his time with Gwen. After an argument between the boys, Gwen decides to stop being Matteo's new friend to avoid further disrupting the boys' friendship. At the talent show, Finn and Matteo forgive each other and recruit Gwen to help them with a different talent: a dance routine.
61	3	"Yes, Lies and Tower Escape"	Shannon Flynn	David Booth	July 4, 2019	403	0.37
When Gwen accidentally breaks a window, Destiny lies to Lou and says that a blue-haired girl with green glasses was the culprit. Later, Destiny and Gwen spot a camper named Ruby who matches Destiny's description. Destiny and Gwen try to keep Ruby from getting in trouble, but they are unsuccessful, and Lou eventually decides to expel Ruby from camp. Feeling bad for Ruby, the girls admit their scheme to Lou, who reveals that she knew all along and had hired Ruby to prank them. Elsewhere, Finn and Matteo want to install a webcam on top of a water tower to watch a nest of owls hatch, but Noah forbids them from going up there because it is dangerous. Meanwhile, Noah has Ava say "Yes, and..." to everything as part of an improv class. She is surprised to see how much she enjoys it, although Finn and Matteo use this to their advantage by asking Ava to take them to the water tower. Ava and the boys become stuck on the tower when the ladder falls over, but they are later rescued by Lou and Noah. Guest star: Madelyn Grace as Ruby
62	4	"An Udder Disaster"	Erika Kaestle	Ian Weinreich & Clayton Sakoda	July 11, 2019	404	0.48
Lou has her dairy cow Bessie shipped to Camp Kikiwaka, and she allows Finn to take care of it. However, Finn accidentally leaves Bessie's gate open, allowing her to briefly escape. Lou decides that Finn is not ready for such a responsibility. When Finn overhears Lou talking to the camp chef, he mistakenly believes that Lou intends to have Bessie cooked. To save Bessie, Finn takes her away from the camp. Lou locates them and says that she actually plans to enter Bessie in a county fair competition. Meanwhile, Gwen and Destiny learn that Ava came to Camp Kikiwaka to get away from her mother, Bonnie, following an argument between the two. Gwen and Destiny, posing as Ava, write an apology letter to Bonnie. When Bonnie decides to visit the camp, she and Ava realize that Gwen and Destiny wrote the letter, and their feud continues as neither is willing to apologize. Lou helps Ava and Bonnie work out their relationship, and the two reconcile. Ava decides to return home, but is convinced by Destiny and Gwen to stay at the camp. Elsewhere, Matteo helps Noah learn French so he can audition for a muscle drink commercial being produced by a Canadian company. Guest stars: Christina Anthony as Bonnie, Garrett Bales as Chef Jeff
63	5	"Hot Spring Friend Machine"	Erika Kaestle	Huong Nguyen	July 18, 2019	405	0.51
Noah learns that Ava has secretly been visiting a hot spring in the woods, and he is upset that Ava did not tell him about its existence. Noah gives Ava an opportunity to admit its existence by sharing a secret of his own, but she instead says that she does not consider him a friend. Feeling upset, Noah tells Finn, Destiny, and Matteo about the hot spring, and they subsequently tell other campers about it. Later, Ava feels bad and decides to tell Noah about the hot spring, saying that she is glad to have a peaceful place of her own to relax. However, she is upset when the hot spring becomes a popular spot for the campers. To make it up to Ava, Noah tries scaring off the campers so she can have the spot to herself again, but he fails. However, the campers retreat when a snake infestation strikes the hot spring area. After the snakes are removed, Ava regains the area to herself and she reconciles with Noah. Meanwhile, Gwen, who has been homeschooled her entire life, is nervous when she learns her parents plan to enroll her in a real school later in the year. Gwen has difficulty reading, so Lou helps her practice. Guest star: Lucas Stadvec as Reggie
64	6	"Water Under the Dock"	Phill Lewis	Lia Woodward & Leah Folta	July 25, 2019	406	0.52
Destiny organizes a fundraiser so she can purchase a machine to remove trash from the local lake. Celebrity actor Austin Justin agrees to help with the fundraiser by giving people the chance to win a canoe ride with him through an auction. Noah and Austin previously worked together as extras on a film, but when Noah fell into a lake, Austin got the larger role of the two and he went on to become famous. Noah believes he was pushed into the lake by Austin, and has disliked him ever since. Austin privately admits to Noah that he pushed him into the lake, but he refuses to tell the public. During the auction, Ava reveals a video she secretly filmed, in which Austin admits what he did to Noah and also insults Moose Rump. Austin is banished and Noah takes his place in the canoe ride auction. Meanwhile, the camp is throwing a hoedown dance, and Matteo agrees to be Gwen's dance partner. However, Finn convinces Matteo that he has actually agreed to be Gwen's boyfriend, which makes Matteo uncomfortable. When Matteo starts avoiding Gwen, she decides to dump him as her dance partner. At the dance, Lou learns what happened between the two and she gets them to dance, restoring their friendship. Guest star: Ricardo Hurtado as Austin Justin
65	7	"In Your Wildest Screams"	Jody Margolin Hahn	Ian Weinreich & Clayton Sakoda	October 5, 2019	410	0.55
Ava and Destiny find Gwen's dream effigy doll, Cuddles, which Gwen had buried after Finn accidentally knocked its head off. Ava and Destiny attach a new head to the doll and present it to Gwen, who is horrified to see it return. Gwen tells the campers that because the summer solstice is underway, Cuddles has the ability to create nightmares, although the campers do not believe her. That night, Lou, Destiny, Gwen and Ava have the same bad dream that their friends are trapped inside a totem pole by Cuddles, who then possesses Lou. Meanwhile, Noah, Finn and Matteo have a nightmare in which Lou has replaced the campers with robot replicas who will obey her. Upon waking from their nightmares, they find that the doll has disappeared on its own, preventing a reburial which would stop the bad dreams. Gwen tells the group that they can avoid more nightmares if they can stay awake until morning, which will mark the end of the solstice. However, they fall asleep again and wind up in another nightmare, in which Cuddles tries to take Gwen away to the woods. The other campers vow that they will stick together with Gwen no matter what, causing the nightmare to end. They subsequently find and bury Cuddles.
66	8	"Inn Trouble"	Phill Lewis	Valerie Ahern & Eric Schaar	October 12, 2019	408	0.61
Noah, Finn and Matteo accept a challenge from the girls to survive in the wilderness for one night with limited resources. Miss Tilly, the owner of an inn, finds the boys later that night in the woods, and they accept her invitation to visit the inn for a quick snack. They intend to leave shortly thereafter to continue their challenge, but they fall asleep. Meanwhile, Hazel returns to the camp for old times' sake, but Lou believes she is really there for something else. With Gwen's help, Lou deduces that Hazel is searching for an old camp treasure. They later learn that Hazel was searching for a time capsule that she and Lou buried years ago when they were best friends. Hazel had become jealous of Lou's friendship with Xander, ultimately leading to the demise of their friendship. Lou and Hazel reconcile, and Lou agrees to let Hazel visit the camp again. Meanwhile, Ava and Destiny are quarantined to their cabin after catching a contagious rash. Guest stars: Tessa Netting as Hazel, Ellen Karsten as Miss Tilly
67	9	"Lake Rancid"	Phill Lewis	David Booth	October 19, 2019	407	0.58
After Destiny cleans some trash out of the camp lake, she makes a misleading social media post claiming that the lake is now free of trash. When a reporter, Randy, decides to interview Destiny about her environmental effort, she has little time to clear out the remaining trash. She is helped by Finn, Matteo, and Gwen, although she is disappointed by their lack of progress. In addition, Destiny has forgotten to schedule a pickup for the trash that was already collected. The children hide the trash in a shed, but Randy learns the truth when the trash tumbles out. Randy convinces Destiny that she has achieved a lot of cleanup already, and he decides to publish photos of the trash to help educate people about recycling and environmental cleanup. Meanwhile, Noah and Ava are chosen to partake in Lou's play that tells the history of the camp and its founder. Noah and Ava believe the play is boring and could benefit from updates, but Lou disagrees. Later, Lou has a dream in which she meets the ghost of the camp founder, who convinces her to take Noah and Ava's advice. Guest star: Chico Benymon as Randy
68	10	"Between a Raccoon and a Hard Place"	Robbie Countryman	Krystal Javier	October 26, 2019	409	0.65
Lou injures her ankle and reluctantly puts Noah, Finn and Matteo in charge of the camp, while Ava is tasked with helping Lou as she recovers. The boys struggle to maintain the camp, and Noah has Ava keep Lou occupied to prevent her from discovering their mishaps. When Lou learns the truth, she gladly realizes that the campers still need her. Meanwhile, Gwen is tired of doing indoor activities thought up by Destiny, so Ava introduces Gwen to the Extreme Team, a trio of girl campers who enjoy extreme outdoor activities. Gwen and the Extreme Team plan to hike up a mountain, but Destiny inadvertently changes the team's mind when she gets them interested in making leather belts instead. Upset, Gwen decides to go on the hike by herself, but she later falls down a hole. Ava and Destiny find Gwen and rescue her using one of the belts to lift her out. Destiny apologizes to Gwen when she realizes how often they do things that Destiny wants to do; Gwen forgives her. Guest stars: Lydya Jewett as Riley, Joelle Better as Jane, Cleo Fraser as Talia
69	11	"Mo-Squito Mo Problems"	Jody Margolin Hahn	Huong Nguyen	November 2, 2019	411	0.49
When mosquitoes become a nuisance at the camp, Matteo tries out several solutions, but none are effective. Gwen creates a foul-smelling paste that keeps the mosquitoes away, and Matteo turns the paste into a spray with a pleasant smell. Gwen is upset when Matteo takes sole credit for the spray, so she starts handing out a modified version of her paste, without the foul odor. Later, Matteo gives Gwen credit for the spray, and the camp is disgusted to learn that she used cow manure as the main ingredient. Gwen and Matteo subsequently use the paste to instead create candles that will keep the mosquitoes away. Meanwhile, Lou wants to choose someone to serve as the camp's song leader. Destiny discovers that Ava has a good singing voice, but Ava is too nervous to sing in front of people. Ava eventually overcomes her fear and is chosen as the song leader. Noah is upset that his parents are getting divorced. Lou wants Noah to talk to her about his feelings, believing it will make him feel better, but he declines. Later, she has Finn talk to Noah. Finn's parents divorced a year ago, and he convinces Noah that he will be okay after his own parents divorce. Guest star: Garrett Bales as Chef Jeff
70	12	"Sore Lou-ser"	Ben DeJesus	Leah Folta & Lia Woodward	November 9, 2019	412	0.61
Camp Kikiwaka competes in an annual sports competition against its rival, Camp Champion, which is operated by a woman named Barb. Lou is upset that Camp Kikiwaka loses every year to Camp Champion, although she wants her campers to focus on having fun instead of trying to beat Barb's team. Lou changes her mind after discovering how good Ava and Gwen are at sports. Lou has the girls play in each game in the competition, pushing Camp Kikiwaka toward victory. Noah and Matteo are disappointed by their limited role in the competition, and when Lou realizes how obsessed she became with winning, she decides to let the boys play in the final part of the competition: an egg-tossing game. Matteo loses, but Camp Champion forfeits the competition to Camp Kikiwaka after Lou discovers that the rival team cheated in the last game by using a hardboiled egg. Meanwhile, Cynthia, a girl from Destiny's school, is on the Camp Champion team. Cynthia has a boyfriend named Chet, and Destiny had previously told Cynthia that she also had a boyfriend, in an attempt to become friends with Cynthia. Destiny has Finn pose as her boyfriend, but she eventually reveals the truth to Cynthia, who still wants to be friends with Destiny. Guest stars: Raini Rodriguez as Barb, Izzy Newman as Cynthia, Bryce Adam Brown as Chet
71	13	"Lone Wolf"	Miguel Cruz	Jason Dorris	November 16, 2019	413	0.50
Gwen's brother Jasper visits her at the camp and reveals that he has had trouble making friends ever since the family moved from the woods to a city. Although Gwen convinces Jasper to try making friends at the camp, he soon gives up and wants to retreat to the woods, while believing that Gwen has become too reliant on people. Meanwhile, Lou wants to make a deal with an oatmeal company to sponsor their product at the camp, but Destiny learns that the company discards imperfect batches of oatmeal. Destiny is upset by the environmental impact of the wasted food, but Lou wants to proceed with the deal. Pa Gordon, the company founder, meets with Lou while Destiny protests against him. When Pa Gordon insults Destiny, Lou decides to end her agreement with his company. Lou reveals that the sponsorship deal would have paid for the camp's scholarship program next year. Gwen is among the campers who got in through the program, and Jasper decides to donate a rare coin to fund the program for the following year, earning him new friends among the campers. Elsewhere, Finn agrees to bathe more often if Matteo can go five days without showering, which he manages to do. Guest stars: Malachi Barton as Jasper, Joel Swetow as Pa Gordon
72	14	"Serf's Up-Rising"	Wendy Faraone	David Booth	November 23, 2019	414	0.46
It is Renaissance Week at Camp Kikiwaka, and each of the campers are assigned roles. Finn is assigned the role of king, and Destiny is a maid. However, Destiny is disappointed with her role and convinces Finn to make her his royal advisor. In her new role, Destiny secretly rules the camp by advising Finn. The campers, annoyed by Finn's actions, attempt to oust him as king. After Lou tells Destiny that everyone was given their roles to help them in specific things (Destiny being a maid to teach her humility), she come clean to the camp. Meanwhile, Matteo is assigned the role of a knight, and Gwen is a bard who decides to write a story about an act of bravery by Matteo. When Mrs. Kipling comes to the camp for a visit, Gwen mistakenly believes that Matteo has tamed a "dragon" and decides to write a story about it. However, Matteo eventually admits the truth to the camp, which Lou considers an act of bravery. Elsewhere, Ava learns that Noah and another camper, Alice, like each other. However, Noah eventually learns that Alice only likes him as part of her role. Guest stars: Garrett Bales as Chef Jeff, Gloria Aung as Alice
73	15	"Summer Winter Wonderland"	Erika Kaestle	Valerie Ahern & Eric Schaar	December 7, 2019	415	0.43
When cold weather occurs at the camp during July, Lou decides to hold an early Christmas celebration. Lou also intends to teach Gwen about the joy that Christmas can bring, although her efforts fail. Destiny declines to take part in the Christmas celebration, so Ava signs them both up to sing in a Christmas show, hoping to get Destiny into a Christmas spirit. However, her plan does not work. Destiny explains that this is the first year celebrating Christmas since her grandfather died, and she had been dreading the holiday because she felt it would be wrong to celebrate without him. She especially enjoyed sledding with her grandfather. As a Christmas gift, Ava and Gwen give Destiny a new sled that includes a quote from her grandfather, which cheers her up. Upon giving the gift, Gwen realizes the joy that Christmas can bring. Meanwhile, Lou sends Noah, Finn and Matteo to the woods to cut down a Christmas tree for a party. They find a perfect tree, but Finn feels bad about having it cut down, and Noah eventually agrees with him. When the boys discover that the tree is home to a group of baby foxes, they decide to leave the tree in its current location and decorate it there, while relocating Lou's party there as well.
74	16	"Cramped Champions"	Erika Kaestle	Clayton Sakoda	January 10, 2020	416	0.68
Camp Champion is accidentally flooded by a wave pool that Barb activated, so Lou allows Barb and her campers to stay at Camp Kikiwaka until the flooded camp is fully dried. Lou is annoyed when she has to share her cabin with Barb. Ava, Destiny, and Gwen get a camper named Sophie as their temporary roommate, but Sophie secretly tries to turn the girls against each other by pointing out habits of theirs that annoy one another. Noah, Finn, and Matteo are displeased that they did not get a temporary roommate, and they unsuccessfully try to recruit one. Camp Champion's young owner Kaylie Champion shows up at Camp Kikiwaka to inquire Barb about what happened at Camp Champion. Realizing how much Barb enjoys her job as camp director, Lou covers up Barb's mistake by taking the blame for the wave pool incident, claiming it was part of a prank war with Camp Champion that went horribly wrong. Kaylie allows Barb to keep her job and departs. Lou and Barb decide to keep their relationship at the "good neighbors" level. Guest stars: Raini Rodriguez as Barb, Estelle Hermansen as Sophie, Amanda Christine as Kaylie Champion
75	17	"A Tale of Two Stackers"	Phill Lewis	Huong Nguyen	January 17, 2020	417	0.50
Lou discovers old boxes containing camp founder Jedediah Swearengen's belongings, including his diary. Lou is against reading the diary as she wants to respect the founder's privacy, but Destiny takes it and learns that Jedediah was a poor camp director at Camp Kikiwaka. He later changed his last name to Champion and opened the rival Camp Champion, which Lou dislikes. Destiny keeps this a secret from Lou, who admires Jedediah, but she later decides to tell the truth. Although Lou is upset, Destiny and Ava cheer her up. Meanwhile, Finn realizes he has a talent for stacking objects, and he is proud to gain a nickname as "The Stacker." Matteo does not think of stacking as a talent, so he sets out to prove that anyone can do it, inadvertently gaining Finn's nickname and upsetting him. The boys subsequently reconcile. Elsewhere, Gwen watches one of Noah's favorite films. Although she disliked the film, she lies to Noah to avoid hurting his feelings. However, she reveals her true feelings after learning that the film was only one part of a large franchise which Noah wants her to experience. Guest star: Travis Burnett as Brian
76	18	"Whatever Floats Your Goat Boat"	Sean Mulcahy	Lia Woodward & Leah Folta	January 24, 2020	418	0.49
Lou is upset when a noisy party boat appears near the camp. She learns the boat is operated by a man named Boomer, who is holding campaign parties for Moose Rump mayor Higgins. Lou goes to the mayor to put an end to the parties, but she discovers that Higgins is actually a goat owned by Boomer. To stop the party boat, Lou decides she will run against Higgins, who previously defeated 16 humans to be elected mayor. Lou assigns Noah to be her campaign advisor, but she later decides to withdraw her candidacy following a poor debate performance with Higgins, who is favored by the audience. Instead, Lou endorses a sloth as the new mayor, and it wins the election. Meanwhile, Destiny gives Gwen a makeover for an upcoming camp photo, but Gwen feels uncomfortable with her new look. Elsewhere, Noah has put Ava in charge of watching Finn and Matteo while he helps Lou. When Ava accidentally hurts Finn and Matteo, she enlists Destiny's help in applying makeup to their faces to hide their injuries. Noah finds out what happened and is initially upset with Ava for lying, but he forgives her. Guest stars: Michael McCusker as Boomer, Maggie Carney as Midge
77	19	"Snow Cups and Fisticuffs"	Kelly Park	David Booth	January 31, 2020	TBA	0.52
Lou buys a shaved ice machine for the campers during a heat wave, although the machine later goes missing. Matteo and Gwen go on a search to solve the mystery of the missing machine, and they ultimately find it destroyed in the woods. They learn that the culprit is the camp cook, Chef Jeff, who was upset that the campers were eating snow cones instead of his food. Lou forgives Chef Jeff, as he has gone through a difficult time with his girlfriend, and he decides to help pay for a new machine. Meanwhile, Finn accidentally hits a camper, Derek, on two separate occasions. Finn gets the impression that Derek wants to fight him later in the day, so he gets defense advice from Ava ahead of the fight. Later, Finn learns that Derek only wanted to meet with him to peacefully discuss their issues, not to fight. Elsewhere, Noah enlists Destiny and Lou to help him film a series of scenes that he intends to compile into a reel, which will demonstrate his acting skills. However, filming does not go well and Noah starts to question his skills. Lou helps Noah realize that his scenes merely need to be simplified to focus more on his acting. Guest stars: Garrett Bales as Chef Jeff, Connor Cain as Derek
78	20	"The S'more, the S'merrier"	Bob Koherr	Valerie Ahern & Eric Schaar	February 7, 2020	TBA	0.58
Destiny wants to spend as much time as possible with Finn and Matteo before summer ends, but her feelings are hurt when she learns from a blog that the boys secretly spent Thanksgiving together without her. As revenge, she recruits two similar boys to be her new friends, in order to make Finn and Matteo jealous. When Finn and Matteo realize what Destiny is doing, they befriend a similar girl named Desiree. The three eventually discuss the issue, with Destiny learning that Matteo's family invited Finn and his newly divorced mother to their home for Thanksgiving. They did not tell Destiny because they did not want to hurt her feelings, and the three soon reconcile. Meanwhile, Lou assigns Ava to be her apprentice and learn how to become a handyperson, but it does not go over well. Elsewhere, Gwen helps Noah teach a senior citizen dance class and she befriends her dance partner, Edna. When Edna does not arrive one day for practice, Gwen learns that Edna has an illness and makes regular hospital visits for medication. Gwen is disturbed by the idea that Edna might not be around one day, but Noah helps her realize that she should appreciate the time she has now with Edna. Guest stars: Shirley Jordan as Edna, Devin Slade Aaron as Max
79	21	"Lava at First Sight"	Jason Shipman	Clayton Sakoda	February 21, 2020	421	0.45
Ava's favorite brother, Alex, comes to Camp Kikiwaka for a visit. The two enjoy mocking things together, but Alex starts becoming a positive person after falling in love with Lou. Upset with Alex's changing personality, Ava locks Lou in an outhouse to sabotage her date with him. However, Ava learns that Alex has become a positive person as a result of being at the camp, and she realizes that she has also become a happier person since her arrival there. Meanwhile, Noah, Finn and Gwen play "stay off the lava" and come up with creative ways to get around while avoiding contact with the ground. Finn and Gwen eventually trick Noah into touching the ground, leaving only the two of them in the game. They compete on an obstacle course to determine the winner, with Finn emerging victorious. Elsewhere, Destiny takes in a stray cat which Matteo becomes attached to, reversing his dislike of cats. Destiny is concerned that Matteo is becoming too attached to the cat when he begins acting like one. Later, Destiny learns the cat belongs to someone, and Matteo is forced to part ways with it when the owner comes to retrieve it. Guest star: Tajh Bellow as Alex
80	22	"Town and Clown Relations"	Morenike Joela	Huong Nguyen	February 28, 2020	422	0.38
Camp Kikiwaka is preparing to hold its annual charity carnival, which will raise money to build a playground for the children of Moose Rump. Lou is now the deputy mayor, and she needs approval from the city council to use an empty lot for the playground. She learns that the council consists of Boomer Gower and his family. Boomer schedules a council vote for the same day as the carnival, hoping to sabotage Lou by making her believe she cannot handle two jobs. At the city council meeting, Boomer stalls the vote in hopes that Lou will resign as deputy mayor, allowing him to take the position, although his plan fails when his family votes to approve the playground. Meanwhile, Gwen and Destiny prepare to play the roles in a clown show for the carnival. Destiny reveals that she comes from a family of clowns, but that she was unable to get the hang of being one herself, which led to her competing in pageants instead. Destiny is concerned that she cannot be a good clown, until Gwen helps her succeed. Meanwhile, Ava pranks Finn by making him believe that she is psychic and that she can train him. When Finn believes that he has become psychic, he winds up convincing Ava of his abilities, before revealing that he has pranked her. Guest stars: Michael McCusker as Boomer, Kristina Hayes as Ma Gower, Scarlett Abinante as Skyler
81	23	"Whisper Toots"	Jody Margolin Hahn	Jason Dorris	March 6, 2020	423	0.54
Lou wants to have friends her own age, and she is happy when she befriends a group of women who hold meetings in the woods. Ava finds the women odd and suspects they are witches, but Lou does not believe her. Later, Lou decides to part ways with the group after learning that Ava was right. Meanwhile, Noah and Destiny learn that Matteo has been sneaking out at night to perform a piano act for older people at Miss Tilly's inn. To avoid hurting his feelings, Noah and Destiny lie to Matteo by saying that they enjoyed his act. Matteo had avoided performing at the camp because he believed that the children would not enjoy his act, but he gains confidence after learning that Noah and Destiny liked it. They confess to him after he decides to perform for the camp, but the three later come together for a joint act. The campers are not impressed, but Matteo is happy that he can still perform at the inn. Elsewhere, Finn tries to help Gwen break a world record so she can get into a book of records, although he accidentally ruins each of their efforts. Later, he gives Gwen a handmade book of his own about their attempts to break a record, and Gwen is happy to receive it. Guest stars: Ellen Karsten as Miss Tilly, Chandler Ryan as Martha
82	24	"My Fairy Lady"	Bob Koherr	Leah Folta & Lia Woodward	March 13, 2020	424	0.44
Finn is upset when his mother's boyfriend Dave visits the camp. Despite Dave's efforts to bond, Finn still does not like him. Dave wants to marry Finn's mother, but only if Finn will approve of the relationship. When Lou tries to solve the problem, Finn reveals that he actually does like Dave but that he felt guilty, as he does not want his father to feel like he is being replaced. Lou helps Finn realize that he can like both his father and Dave. Meanwhile, Ava learns she was not invited to a party for the camp counselors because she is considered unfriendly. Noah and Destiny try to teach Ava how to be polite, and she is later accepted to the party. Meanwhile, Gwen believes that a fairy has been leaving her gifts in the woods, but Matteo does not believe her and tries to prove that fairies are not real. Guest stars: Jerry Trainor as Dave, Shaylee Mansfield as Willow, McKale Jude Bingham as Becca
83	25	"Party Pooper"	Jody Margolin Hahn	Erin Dunlap	March 20, 2020	425	0.45
Lou goes to give a speech at a camp director conference in Vermont, and Destiny convinces Lou to let her come along. However, Lou has only a day to write her speech, and Destiny turns out to be a distraction. Later, Destiny becomes trapped behind a folding bed in their hotel room, and Lou winds up missing the conference while trying to get her out. Destiny reveals that she wanted to come on the trip because she misses hanging out with Lou, like when they lived together in Woodchuck Cabin. Lou misses Destiny too and decides to set aside a day each week for them to spend time together. At the camp, Noah is left in charge during Lou's absence. Ava's birthday is coming up, but she tells Noah that she does not want to celebrate, while hinting that she actually does want a party. Ava is upset when she thinks a party is not being planned, and she is surprised when she finds out she was wrong. Meanwhile, while stargazing, Gwen suddenly abandons Matteo without explanation. Matteo realizes that he had chocolate on the back of his pants, and he fears that Gwen believes he pooped his pants. She later reveals that she had farted while they were stargazing, and she was embarrassed thinking that he heard it.
84	26	"Squatters' Fights"	Erika Kaestle	Valerie Ahern & Eric Schaar	June 21, 2020	426	0.29
Ava and Destiny are tired of having to share their small bathroom with each other. When Ava discovers the large bathroom in Grizzly Cabin, she and Destiny trick Noah, Finn and Matteo into switching cabins, claiming that Woodchuck Cabin is superior. The boys are upset to learn how small their new bathroom is, but the girls refuse to switch back. Meanwhile, Gwen is upset when she realizes that she has lost her outdoors skills, such as the ability to make a fire. She eventually decides to embrace modern technology, but regains her old skills when she senses that the boys are planning to reclaim their cabin. Gwen sets up traps in Grizzly Cabin and stops the boys. Meanwhile, Lou hires an old friend, Jerry, as the camp handyman. However, he turns out to be incompetent, and she cannot bring herself to fire him. Later, Lou promises to have a bigger bathroom built for the girls, and they agree to move back into Woodchuck Cabin. However, Lou has tasked Jerry with building the additional space, and he does a poor job. Guest star: Jayme Andrews as Jerry
85	27	"Three Stars and a Baby"	Patrick Maloney	David Booth	June 28, 2020	427	0.40
The campers are given evaluation forms to rate how good of a job their counselors are doing, and Ava worries that she will be ranked poorly and be reassigned to new campers. To ensure this does not happen, Ava gets gifts for Destiny and Gwen, who decide to take advantage of the situation and have Ava do their chores as well. To regain control over her campers, Ava lies to them and says that she has been reassigned to a new cabin, convincing the girls to do their own chores in order to keep her as their counselor. Meanwhile, Lou's cousin Ronnie visits the camp, and she has brought along her baby daughter Lily. Ronnie wants free time to enjoy herself, so she leaves Lily in Lou's care. Lou is afraid she will accidentally hurt Lily, like she did to Finn when he was a baby. When Lily starts crying, Lou overcomes her fear and holds Lily to calm her down. In Grizzly Cabin, Noah and Matteo get rid of a bunk bed that is never used, but they cannot decide how to use the new space. They try a vending machine, a hammock, and a weightlifting set. They ultimately decide to bring back the bunk bed and use it as a nap space to avoid messing up their made beds. Guest star: Mackenzie Marsh as Ronnie
86	28	"Manic Moose Day"	Monica Marie Contreras	Huong Nguyen	July 12, 2020	428	0.38
Lou convinces a high school acquaintance, Sean, to visit the camp. Sean (stylized as S3an) has a blog that documents her world travels, and Lou is hoping she will write about Camp Kikiwaka and increase its publicity. Lou eventually becomes depressed about her own lack of accomplishments and soon wishes that Sean would leave the camp, prompting Gwen to add moose pheromones in Sean's pockets so she will be chased off. When Lou finds out what Gwen has done, she sets out with Gwen to rescue Sean from a moose. In the process, they learn that Sean's blog is a lie and that she never traveled around the world. Meanwhile, Matteo's online friend, Benji, visits the camp. Finn and Destiny try to befriend Benji, but he appears to be bothered by their efforts. Matteo thinks they are trying too hard, but Benji reveals that he gets nervous when meeting new people. Later, the four bond while fishing. Meanwhile, Ava convinces Noah that they should try sneaking off to a concert, but they ultimately are unable to get there. Guest stars: Jinhee Joung as S3an, Zach Willis as Benji
87	29	"Breaking Barb"	Miranda May	Clayton Sakoda	July 19, 2020	429	0.29
Lou and Barb decide to participate in a camp director swap for a week. The children at Camp Kikiwaka are unhappy with Barb's strict rules, so Destiny and Ava try to loosen her up by sending her on a scavenger hunt. The plan works, as Barb discovers how much fun a camp can be, but problems arise when she starts to neglect her duties as camp director. Destiny retrieves Lou to restore order, and the swap is called off. Meanwhile, Finn and Matteo enjoy playing a wilderness survival video game, but Gwen insists it is nothing like real life. She challenges Finn to a competition to see whose outdoor skills are better, and Matteo acts as an observer and takes note of their individual skills. Finn succeeds several times in proving himself, but Gwen dismisses this as mere luck. They later find Julie, a birthday girl who fell down a well, and she is dressed as a princess for her party. Finn notes that this is like the video game, in which outdoor skills must be used to rescue a princess, although he too falls down the well while trying to save her. Gwen rescues them both and later takes on a liking for video games. Guest stars: Raini Rodriguez as Barb, Paul Rogan as Wizard, Kaliayh Rhambo as Julie
88	30	"Raven About Bunk'd"	Trevor Kirschner	Jason Dorris	July 24, 2020	430	0.72
Raven, Chelsea, Booker, Nia, Levi, and Tess set out on a long road trip to Maine's Camp Champion, but a GPS glitch sends them off course to Camp Kikiwaka, a place with an uncertain future even for those who can catch a glimpse of the future. While Raven and Chelsea hunt for Maine lobster, the kids make arts and crafts and develop feats of engineering, and then set out to find the camp's infamous “Snipe” in Moose Rump's Forbidden Forest. The adventure also includes celebrity piglets, hidden tunnels and ausical performance, as the newcomers forge a camaraderie with Lou, Noah, Ava, Destiny, Gwen, Finn, and Matteo – and set out to own the summer. Special guest stars: Raven-Symoné as Raven, Anneliese van der Pol as Chelsea, Issac Ryan Brown as Booker, Navia Robinson as Nia, Jason Maybaum as Levi, Sky Katz as Tess Guest star: Nick A. Fisher as Kyle

=== Season 5 (2021) ===
No. overall	No. in season	Title	Directed by	Written by	Original release date	Prod. code	U.S. viewers (millions)
89	1	"Lou's Still the Boss, but Now There's a Ross"	Phill Lewis	Valerie Ahern & Eric Schaar	January 15, 2021	501	0.61
At the start of the camp season, Emma Ross has returned to Camp Kikiwaka to visit Lou and Destiny while mentioning about her upcoming debut fashion line and owning five islands. Her hanging out with them starts to make Ava jealous. Ava later finds footage on the Internet where Emma's first attempt at her debut led to her falling off the runway and landing on Beyoncé who then fell on Jennifer Lopez and she fell on Rihanna and she fell on Lady Gaga. Overhearing the comments by Ava, Lou, and Destiny, Emma admitted that fact and that she ran off after that disastrous experience. Emma then leaves making Lou and Destiny disappointed in Ava. Meanwhile, Matteo wears a fake moustache after having seen Finn starting to shave. They alongside Noah investigate the ghost story about a ghostly boy that Emma mentioned about their cabin and the ghost facts start to come true. When they try to get rid of the ghost, they find that he was just a camper named Paul assigned to their cabin as he leaves to get a transfer to another cabin. After the suspension bridge to Camp Kikiwaka is destroyed during a thunderstorm, Emma is left stranded until Lou, Destiny, and Ava persuade her to cross a log as if she is doing a second attempt on the runway. Once that is done, Emma returns to Camp Kikiwaka where Lou would allow Ava to perform the song that she was working on. When Ava declines, Lou plans to tell a ghost story as the boys quote "No ghost stories" causing Paul to once again state that he is not a ghost. Emma quotes that the camp season is already off to a crazy start. Special guest star: Peyton List as Emma Ross Guest star: River Drosche as Paul Absent: Trevor Tordjman as Parker Preston
90	2	"Rise of the Machine"	Phill Lewis	Mike Montesano & Ted Zizik	January 22, 2021	502	0.40
Ava and Noah run the camp's daycare Pee-Wee Waka while Destiny and Finn host the camp's news show, "Talking About Waka" with Mateo as technical director. Ava and Noah meet Nadine, an 8 year old who believes she is a superhero made of metal. Finn starts a comedic segment which attracts a group of people, although Destiny becomes annoyed that Finn is getting attention. Nadine heads out to find Big Stinky, the camp's skunk who terrorized them 3 years ago, as she wants to find herself an enemy. Noah and Ava go after her, and find her stuck on branches. As Noah is about to get sprayed, Ava jumps in front of him, getting sprayed herself. Meanwhile, Destiny starts the show without Finn, who is trying to find a way to get inside. As Mateo lets him in, Destiny reveals that she wanted to do the show alone as Finn got the attention, but he reveals that he started being funny as he was afraid of Destiny's smarts. They make up and do the show together, reminding Ava and Noah about their younger selves. Guest star: Kyriana Kratter as Nadine Absent: Trevor Tordjman as Parker Preston
91	3	"R.V. Having Fun Yet?"	Bob Koherr	David Booth	January 29, 2021	503	0.30
In the past, it was revealed that Jedediah Swearengen had a partner named "Hatchet Joe" Preston who helped to find and co-own Camp Kikiwaka. In the present, Preston's great-grandson named Parker Preston arrives at Camp Kikiwaka in his R.V. to become the co-owner at the time when Lou was preparing for a presentation for the parents of some kids at Pee-Wee Waka. His ideas that he makes for Finn, Mateo, and Noah to improve the situation backfire causing two nosepicking students to withdraw their kids. After the boys were reprimanded by Lou, Parker admits that his parents cut him off due to his various bad business ideas like steak-flavored toothpaste and takes his leave. Meanwhile, Destiny and Ava check out Parker's R.V. and try out its amenities like a nougat crane machine that also contained bananas. This lasts until the power goes out with Ava trapped in the massage chair. Hearing someone coming, Destiny covers Ava with a blanket and hides in the nougat crane machine. Parker enters as Lou shows up to apologize for what she said. While accepting Lou's forgiveness, Parker finds Ava trapped in the massage chair after accidentally sitting on here while Destiny can't get out of the nougat crane machine due to the door getting jammed. Parker restores the power by turning on the R.V.'s motor to help free them. Then he starts to do Lou's victory dance which Lou corrects him on as Ava and Destiny also join in.
92	4	"Tentacle Difficulties"	Wendy Faraone	Clayton Sakoda	February 5, 2021	504	0.36
Ava and Noah decide to volunteer a field trip to the Moose Rump Aquarium for the children at Camp Pee-Wee-Waka, but it happens to actually turn out that Noah is afraid of the underwater creatures and is not able to help Ava volunteer the field trip. Meanwhile, Destiny and Parker disagree on the significance of a majestic tree, and Destiny tries to prevent Parker from cutting down one of the trees to park his R.V. in the area since the latter thinks that his strategy is the best strategy to take the camp to the "next level" regardless of people at the camp already telling him that they like it the way it is in its current state and condition. Finn and Matteo play with a robot that Matteo upgraded into an AI and the former calls "Clarice", but it takes a toll and self-destructs by cutting down a cell tower and crashing into the same tree that Destiny and Parker were standing right by.
93	5	"Luck of the Chuck"	Wendy Faraone	Mike Montesano & Ted Zizik	February 12, 2021	505	0.33
Lou takes out Woody the burnt woodchuck as her good luck charm for a camp evaluation, but Destiny and Matteo refuse to believe in luck. Woody is grabbed by a bald eagle during Matteo and Finn's bird-watching session. With Woody missing, bad things start happening but Destiny offers to help in order to prove to Lou there is no such thing as bad luck. However, when a deer breaks into her cabin, Destiny falls apart. She becomes very furious at Finn and Matteo after realizing that they're the ones who lost Woody, leading to all the bad luck. They later find Woody in a store and Lou wins him back by competing over Moose Rump knowledge. Meanwhile, Ava agrees to help Noah put on a puppet show for the PeeWees. Noah wants to put on a goofy comedy but Ava convinces him to put on a serious play, which ends traumatizing the children. To get Noah to forgive her, Ava rewrites the script. Guest stars: Kyriana Kratter as Nadine, Brett Maline as Emmitt
94	6	"Look Who's Squawking"	Jon Rosenbaum	Justin Abarca	February 19, 2021	506	0.36
When Ava is relieved of her PeeWeeWaka duties, she begs Lou to let her prove that she can handle the responsibility. So, Lou puts her in charge of reviving the camper of the week program where the winner shares his favorite family recipe with the camp. She chooses Matteo but struggles to get him to choose a recipe. Realizing that something is bothering Matteo, Ava reaches out to him and he reveals that he has trouble choosing between a recipe from his mother's or father's side. Ava understands what he is going through because, as a biracial child, she has always struggled to choose one side. Meanwhile, Miss Tilly asks Destiny, Finn and Noah to watch over her parrot. The parrot says phrases that make them think that Miss Tilly is hosting a revenge dinner to poison her enemies. They become paranoid and sneak into Miss Tilly's dinner to warn the guests but later realize that it is just a "guess the killer" game dinner. Guest stars: Ellen Karsten as Miss Tilly, Marc Cedric Smith as Mr. Crumbwell Absent: Trevor Tordjman as Parker Preston
95	7	"Raucous Science"	Jody Margolin Hahn	Miranda May	February 26, 2021	507	0.34
Lou signs up for Moose Rump Community College because she needs one more credit in order to graduate. She is shocked to find that Matteo teaches science at the college. To get students to respect him, Matteo has been acting very tough. This causes some of the students to plan a prank on Matteo but Lou turns on them to save Matteo. Parker becomes Noah's manager to help him get acting gigs. However, while demonstrating to Noah how to act in a commercial, Parker ends up getting the job instead of Noah. Meanwhile, Finn finds out that his mother and stepfather are having a daughter. He tells Ava and Destiny about it and they spend the day teaching him how to become a good big brother. Guest stars: Thomas Hobson as Bohdi, Austin Boyce as Debra
96	8	"Baton-man Begins"	Jody Margolin Hahn	Lia Woodward & Leah Folta	March 5, 2021	508	0.32
While visiting Finn at the hospital, Destiny befriends a girl patient named Kit. Noah develops a crush on Kit and to impress her, he lies that he is great at baton twirling. When Kit asks him to perform a routine for other children at the hospital, Noah enlists Destiny to train him. However, before the performance, Noah decides to come clean to Kit, but Kit insists that he should still do the baton twirling routine. After taking Finn back to camp, Lou asks Ava to take care of him as he recovers. Ava tries to get Finn to read books but Finn asks her to act out the scenes. She later realizes that Finn is using her as a human TV. Meanwhile, Matteo and Lou create board games inspired by Camp Kikiwaka for the children at the hospital. Guest stars: Isabella Cuda as Kit, Parker Gray as Sarah Absent: Trevor Tordjman as Parker Preston
97	9	"Everyone's Trap'd"	Kim Wayans	Huong Nguyen	May 31, 2021	509	0.22
Ava and Destiny are planning a secret scary midnight movie but Lou asks them to take care of Nadine for the night. They try to get Nadine to sleep so that they can sneak out and watch the movie but she wants to do superhero training with them. Nadine pretends to fall asleep and follows them to the movie. To convince her not to tell Lou about it, Ava and Destiny allow Nadine to tie them up as part of her superhero training. Meanwhile, Lou is struggling with her latest assignment from Matteo's class. Parker tries to help by submitting the project for her. They sneak into the class to retrieve the homework before Matteo finds out but they end up trapped. Noah, Finn and Matteo have a sleepover but Matteo is afraid of falling asleep first and getting pranked. Guest star: Kyriana Kratter as Nadine
98	10	"Pop Poppin' In"	Erika Kaestle	Teleplay by : David Booth & Valerie Ahern & Eric Schaar; Story by : Miranda May	June 1, 2021	510	0.16
Noah invites producers to film Camp Kikiwaka for a potential summer camp reality show. When Jane, the producer, complains that the camp doesn't have enough drama, Noah tricks Finn and Matteo into fighting. Realizing that the drama is hurting Finn and Matteo's friendship, Noah stands up to Jane and ends the reality show. Lou's grandfather, Pop Pop, comes to Kikiwaka but he keeps undermining her authority, treating her as a child. Ava encourages Lou to stand up to Pop Pop. Meanwhile, Parker inspires Destiny to start selling her crafts but after making some money, Destiny gets carried away and focuses all of her energy into making as much money as possible. Parker intervenes and helps Destiny go back to normal. Guest stars: John Ennis as Pop Pop, Chauntae Pink as Jane
99	11	"Roll Models"	Erika Kaestle	Crystal Shaw	June 2, 2021	511	0.24
Lou leaves Parker in charge of the camp as she goes on a road trip in his R.V. to her childhood home after learning that her cousin Cricket named a baby after her. She is joined by Noah who wants to see his brother who is supposed to be interning for NASA. After realizing that Matteo is in the R.V, Lou calls Parker to tell him about it but Parker lies that Matteo is at the camp. So, Lou authorizes Finn to prank Parker into thinking that Matteo is stuck in another dimension. Meanwhile, Ava learns that Destiny is the champion of an underground marble racing competition. She cheers for her but Destiny finds it embarrassing. To get back at her, Ava joins the race against Destiny. However, after realizing how important it is to Destiny, Ava sabotages herself just when she's about to win. Guest stars: Jermaine Harris as Guion
100	12	"Gi Whiz"	Monica Marie Contreras	Nick Geisler & Claire Nauman	June 3, 2021	512	0.26
On their road trip, Lou, Matteo and Noah stop by a self-defense class taught by Matteo's mother. After participating in a competition and emerging victorious, Matteo becomes scared that his mother will make him take over the class, like she always intended, even though he wants to be a scientist. Lou and Noah help Matteo stand up to his parents. Back at the camp, Parker starts agreeing to everything the campers want in order to get them to like him. Ava confronts him about it because it is putting the campers' safety at risk. At first, she agrees to keep the campers' safe by saying no after Parker's approvals. Eventually, Ava forces Parker to do his job of keeping the campers safe. Guest stars: Krizia Bajos as Carina, Micah Abbey as Zachary
101	13	"Dancin' Up a Storm"	Jason Shipman	Valerie Ahern & Eric Schaar	June 4, 2021	513	0.35
Lou's road trip with Matteo and Noah comes to a disappointing end after arriving at her childhood home only to realize that her cousin Cricket hates her. It turns out that it was a baby donkey that Cricket and her husband named after Lou. Realizing that Cricket has been trying to erase her from family memories, Lou confronts her about it and decides to leave, but they are stuck because of a storm. As Lou and Cricket continue arguing, Matteo and Noah realize that Cricket is only upset because Lou left her behind. Back at the camp, Ava and Destiny are terrorized by a bug in their cabin. Ava wants to kill it but Destiny wants to catch and release it. Meanwhile, Parker wants to throw a dance party on his last day in charge before Lou returns from her road trip. He tries to teach Finn to dance but realizes that he is putting too much pressure on him. Guest stars: Bailey Stender as Cricket, Kyle Matthew as Myron
102	14	"Out of the Doghouse"	Danny Wayne	Jason Dorris	June 11, 2021	515	0.28
Destiny and Lou are forced to cancel Ava's Woodchuck initiation ceremony due to a noise complaint from the camp's neighbor, Junkyard Judy. Destiny insists that she can win over Judy by being nice to her. After several failed attempts and hard work to impress Judy, Destiny gives up and joins forces with Lou to get revenge on Judy by pranking her. They sneak into her junkyard and find that Judy has been hiding the stolen head of the Moose Rump moose. It turns out that Judy went to Camp Kikiwaka as a teenager but was pranked by girls from the Woodchuck cabin to steal the head. Since then, she has always hated the Woodchucks. Meanwhile, after hearing about Woodchuck cabin's initiation and traditions, Noah wants the Grizzly cabin to have bonding activities too. Parker offers to help them come up with activities but instead tricks them into doing the chores that Lou assigned to him. Guest star: Sarah Waisman as Junkyard Judy Absent: Shelby Simmons as Ava King
103	15	"The Great Awkward Bake-Off"	Phill Lewis	Lia Woodward & Leah Folta	June 18, 2021	514	0.32
Ava develops a crush on a camp counselor named Dante, and volunteers to help him bake cookies for the mid-summer party fundraiser. However, she embarrasses and hurts herself in her attempts to impress Dante. To help Ava, Destiny sends Dante a cookie with a love note with cookie puns on Ava's behalf. Ava forces her to tell Dante it was a mistake, but Destiny later convinces Ava to tell him how she feels. They start dating but after seeing how weird Dante is, Ava decides to break up with him. When Lou asks Parker to let her move into his RV by lying that her cabin is flooded, Finn convinces Parker that Lou has a crush on him. Lou later reveals that she only wanted to stay in the RV because she loved using it during her road trip. Meanwhile, Finn and Matteo are competing over theme ideas for the mid-summer party. Noah convinces them and the rest of the camp to do a theme about Juneteenth. Guest star: Bryce Clyde Jenkins as Dante
104	16	"I Won't Let You Clown"	Raven-Symoné	David Booth	June 25, 2021	516	0.38
Nadine asks Matteo to help her become the camp superhero by teaching her Jujutsu, but offers to help her through science instead. However, all of his scientific demonstrations end up failing. Lou asks Parker and Noah to participate in a contest to win a boat for the camp. The challenge is to keep one's hand on the boat the longest. They run into Barb, who asks Parker to quit Kikiwaka for Camp Champion. With just the three of them left, Parker pretends to accept Barb's offer and asks to shake on it. This causes Barb to let go of the boat, leaving Noah as the winner. Meanwhile, Destiny's old friend from the circus, Claire, comes to visit, but Destiny is not happy about it because Claire always makes her dress up as a clown whenever they spend time together. To avoid hurting Claire's feelings, Destiny agrees to be a clown during the whole visit but eventually decides to be honest with Claire. Special guest star: Raini Rodriguez as Barb Guest stars: Kyriana Kratter as Nadine, Sophia Sluyter as Claire Absent: Shelby Simmons as Ava King
105	17	"Crushin' It"	Miranda May	Crystal Shaw	July 2, 2021	517	0.28
When Gwen returns to Camp Kikiwaka for a visit, Destiny and Noah want her to stay for good. So, they start getting themselves into dangerous situations to make Gwen feel needed. Gwen spends most of her day saving them. They pretend to be trapped in a trash compactor but when Gwen accidentally turns it on before falling in, they are forced to admit the truth. Meanwhile, when Matteo hears Gwen talking about her dog, Kevin, he assumes that Kevin is a boy Gwen likes. He becomes jealous and tries to change his look and personality to impress Gwen. Meanwhile, when Kikiwaka is nominated as one of the happiest places in the state, Parker is tasked with guiding a reporter to show him how happy the camp is. He enlists Finn's help with making the camp happy, but Finn digs up flowers called the weeping posies which make people cry. Special guest star: Scarlett Estevez as Gwen Guest star: Andrew Puente as Marcus
106	18	"Camp Creepy-Waka"	Patrick Maloney	Crystal Shaw	July 9, 2021	518	0.40
Camp Kikiwaka is holding a scary story night, but Barb comes over to figure out why her campers keep leaving Camp Champion for Kikiwaka. Before story time, Finn and Noah argue over Finn stuffing his dirty clothes under the bed. Ava and Destiny are also fighting because Destiny keeps scheduling environmental activities without giving Ava a break. After hearing Finn's story in which laundry is the Clothes Monster, Noah realizes that Finn is scared of dirty laundry and offers to help. In Destiny's story, a character inspired by Ava refuses to help save the world from aliens and ends up being an alien herself. After the story, Ava explains to Destiny that she still cares about the environment but still needs a break to refresh. Barb tells a story in which she is a vampire slayer named Barb Helsing who helps defeat Count Dracu-Lou the vampire who has been turning campers into vampires. After the story, Lou helps Barb realize that campers leave Camp Champion because she lacks conflict management skills. As Lou apologizes to Parker for not getting to his werewolf story, she thinks that the werewolf is Parker's costume only to find that the teeth are real. Everyone scatters as it is revealed that the werewolf is Parker's friend Bernie who he called over to help with his possible story. Special guest star: Raini Rodriguez as Barb Absent: Raphael Alejandro as Matteo Silva
107	19	"A Star Is Torn"	Karan Brar	Mike Montesano & Ted Zizik	July 16, 2021	519	0.29
Lou's favorite actress, Melody Chapman, comes over to research for her upcoming movie role as a camp counsellor. Destiny wants to ask Melody for help spreading awareness about cleaning the lake but Lou asks them not to bother the actress. Noah offers to use his acting skills to help Destiny get Melody's attention, but he fails multiple times. Lou wants Melody to spend all the time with her but Melody wants to shadow Ava because her character is a rebel like Ava. This causes friction between Lou and Ava, but Lou eventually admits that she was being selfish. On learning what Destiny and Noah were up to, Melody agrees to post about the lake and offers Noah a part in her movie. Meanwhile, Lou sends Finn and Matteo to steal vegetables from Camp Champion's garden but they end up trapped in an underground bunker. In the bunker, Matteo finds a computer with a game that makes him think that he has accidentally launched a missile to destroy Moose Rump. Guest star: Ali Gallo as Melody Chapman Absent: Trevor Tordjman as Parker Preston
108	20	"Moose Queens and Possum Kings"	Kelly Park	Terrell Lawrence	July 30, 2021	520	0.30
Destiny wants to enter the Moose Queen pageant to win money for cleaning the lake but she is not old enough. With Parker's help, she coaches Ava to compete on her behalf but Ava is uncooperative because she hates pageants. Destiny becomes upset and gives up. Ava makes it up to her by practicing on her own but Destiny apologizes for pushing her to be someone she is not. They get Parker to compete, and he wins Moose King. Meanwhile, after discovering that Nadine has given up her superhero fantasy, Finn decides to become a supervillain called the Possum King to get Nadine to be a superhero again. Nadine refuses and later tells Lou that she gave up being a superhero because other kids asked her to grow up. Lou, who has been holding on to childhood toys, helps Nadine realize that there is no rush to grow up and she should do what makes her happy. Nadine agrees to embrace her superhero fantasy as Nadine the Machine. Guest star: Kyriana Kratter as Nadine Absent: Raphael Alejandro as Matteo Silva
109	21	"Frien'ds Forever"	Sean Mulcahy	Valerie Ahern & Eric Schaar	August 6, 2021	521	0.33
On the last day of camp, Parker's sister Priscilla flies to Kikiwaka to get Parker back into the family business. On behalf of the Prestons, she gives Lou a check to start a new camp but Lou is scared of changes and taking on more responsibilities. Destiny has a hard time accepting changes as well when Ava recommends her to become a camp counselor next year. Meanwhile, Noah struggles to tell Finn and Matteo that he will not return to camp because he will be filming a movie. To deal with the overwhelming changes, they all go to the same thinking spot. Ava helps them realize that a change is not necessarily a bad thing. Parker returns and joins them after realizing that he is happier with his friends at Kikiwaka than when he is working for his family. Later, the campers and their counselors gather around a campfire where Ava announces Destiny's promotion to camp counselor, before singing the Kikiwaka camp song together, one last time. Special guest star: Meg Donnelly as Priscilla Preston

=== Season 6: Learning the Ropes (2022–23) ===
No. overall	No. in season	Title	Directed by	Written by	Original release date	Prod. code
110	1	"Learning the Ropes"	Trevor Kirschner	Erin Dunlap	June 10, 2022	601
Guest star: Thom Rivera as The Marshal
111	2	"Never a Dull Moo-ment"	Trevor Kirschner	Valerie Ahern & Eric Schaar	June 17, 2022	602
Guest star: Thom Rivera as The Marshal
112	3	"Worst Aid"	Jody Margolin Hahn	Mike Montesano & Ted Zizik	June 24, 2022	603
113	4	"Wrecks Mark the Spot"	Jody Margolin Hahn	Clayton Sakoda	July 1, 2022	604
Absent: Shiloh Verrico as Winnie
114	5	"The Truth Will Sweat You Free"	Wendy Faraone	Roxy Simons	July 8, 2022	605
Guest stars: Thom Rivera as The Marshal, Grace Lu as Megan
115	6	"Where the Buffalo Betties Roam"	Robbie Countryman	Victor M. Duenas	July 15, 2022	606
Guest stars: Yvette Cason as Rose, Ren Hanami as Mavis, DeeDee Rescher as Iris
116	7	"A Recipe for Disaster"	Karan Brar	Darren L. Thomas	July 22, 2022	607
Guest star: Cali DiCapo as Sam
117	8	"Back in the Saddle"	Robbie Countryman	David Booth	July 29, 2022	608
Guest star: Thom Rivera as The Marshal
118	9	"Bunkhouse of Horror"	Phill Lewis	Clayton Sakoda	September 25, 2022	611
Guest star: Steve Bannos as Gus
119	10	"Hauntin' Around the Christmas Tree"	Jon Rosenbaum	Nick Geisler & Claire Nauman	December 2, 2022	612
Guest stars: Zachary Michael Cruz as Young Parker, Harper Wasnesky as Young Priscilla
120	11	"Hope You Geyser Ready to Go!"	Miranda May	Valerie Ahern & Eric Schaar	January 2, 2023	609
121	12	"The Song Remains a Pain"	Phill Lewis	Mike Montesano & Ted Zizik	January 2, 2023	610
Guest star: Anna Garcia as Clementine
122	13	"Art Imitates Life"	Jon Rosenbaum	Roxy Simons	January 13, 2023	613
123	14	"Wild West Side Story"	Princess Monique Filmz	Victor M. Duenas	January 20, 2023	614
Guest star: Jordan Clark as Victoria Vance
124	15	"The Wrath of Con"	Victor Gonzalez	Darren L. Thomas	January 27, 2023	615
Guest star: Lilly Bonilla as Marsha
125	16	"Finn It to Win It"	Victor Gonzalez	Valerie Ahern & Eric Schaar	February 3, 2023	616
Finn visits the Kikiwaka Ranch where he is to under training to become a counselor. His first task involves dealing with a homesick Jake. Meanwhile, Destiny is annoyed that the lock to the bathroom isn't fix as Winnie fixes it. Though they both get locked in due to Winnie leaving the toolbox outside of the bathroom as Jake later gets locked in with them. At the same time, Parker and Bill adopt a pig to look for truffles as it keeps finding things that aren't truffles. Special guest star: Will Buie Jr. as Finn
126	17	"Alpaca-lypse Now"	Patrick Maloney	David Booth	February 17, 2023	617
Guest star: Emanuel Borria as Javi
127	18	"The Wicked Switch of the West" "Wicked Switch West"	Miranda May	Mike Montesano & Ted Zizik	February 24, 2023	618
128	19	"No Pain, No Grain"	Dave Cove	Clayton Sakoda	March 3, 2023	619
Guest stars: Jacob Herren as Wayne, Frankie Rodriguez as Nicholas
129	20	"Shoe Drops and Chili Plops" "Shoe Dro Chili Pop"	Terri J. Vaughn	Victor M. Duenas	March 12, 2023	620
Guest star: Michael Rishawn as Teddy Starr
130	21	"Pickett Fencing"	Shilpi Roy	Darren L. Thomas	March 12, 2023	621
Guest star: Daphne Rey as Jill
131	22	"Model Citizen"	Jason Shipman	Roxy Simons	March 19, 2023	622
Guest stars: Yvette Cason as Rose, Ren Hanami as Mavis, DeeDee Rescher as Iris
132	23	"Camp Fails and Beaver Tails"	Danny Wayne	David Booth	March 26, 2023	623
Guest stars: John Charles Meyer as Branch Shrub, Tristan Michael Brown as Lyle
133	24	"Tap'd Out"	Erika Kaestle	Valerie Ahern & Eric Schaar	April 2, 2023	624
Guest star: Alex Quijano as Richard
134	25	"Badminton to the Bone"	Erika Kaestle	Mike Montesano & Ted Zizik	April 9, 2023	625
Guest star: Grace Lu as Megan
135	26	"For Letter or Worse"	Bob Koherr	Eugene Garcia-Cross	April 16, 2023	626
Guest stars: Thom Rivera as The Marshal, Jordan Clark as Victoria
136	27	"Butter You Doing Here?"	Bob Koherr	Erin Dunlap	April 23, 2023	627
Guest stars: Brandon Severs as Ken, Sonya Leslie as Judge Conner
137	28	"Writer's Locked"	Victor Gonzalez	Clayton Sakoda	May 7, 2023	628
Guest star: Kayden Alexander Koshelev as Oliver
138	29	"Most Wanted"	Morenike Joela Evans	David Booth	May 14, 2023	629
Guest star: Jen Kober as Sheriff Lawless
139	30	"Desperate Treasures"	Jody Margolin Hahn	Erin Dunlap	May 21, 2023	630
Guest stars: Thom Rivera as The Marshal, Grace Lu as Megan, Jordan Clark as Victoria

=== Season 7: Learning the Ropes (2023–24) ===
No. overall	No. in season	Title	Directed by	Written by	Original release date	Prod. code
140	1	"Cursed Day of Camp"	Robbie Countryman	Erin Dunlap	July 23, 2023	701
Guest stars: Brandilyn Cheah as Scout, Gracen Newton as Corbin
141	2	"Workaversary Girl"	Robbie Countryman	David Booth	July 30, 2023	702
Guest star: Martin Fajardo as Joshua
142	3	"Meat Cute"	Trevor Kirschner	Valerie Ahern & Eric Schaar	August 6, 2023	703
Guest star: Imogen Cohen as Cleo
143	4	"An Arrow Victory"	Trevor Kirschner	Mike Montesano & Ted Zizik	August 13, 2023	704
Guest stars: Innocent Ekakatie as Danny, Kenneth Moseley as Larry
144	5	"Hot Couture"	Bob Koherr	Roxy Simons	August 20, 2023	705
Guest star: Brandilyn Cheah as Scout
145	6	"What About Barb?"	Victor Gonzalez	Nick Geisler	August 27, 2023	706
Special guest star: Raini Rodriguez as Barb Barca Guest star: Zeke Bernier as Tristan
146	7	"Wastin' Away Again in Barb-aritaville"	Victor Gonzalez	Clayton Sakoda	September 3, 2023	707
Special guest star: Raini Rodriguez as Barb Barca
147	8	"Don't Hate the Mayor, Hate the Game"	Shilpi Roy	Christian L. Scott	September 10, 2023	708
Guest stars: Thom Rivera as The Marshal, Brandilyn Cheah as Scout
148	9	"Coop D'etat"	Miranda May	Mike Montesano & Ted Zizik	September 17, 2023	709
While Lou is away looking for a buyer for the land next door, Destiny works with Scout on how to handle the chicken situation, though Scout takes things too far by releasing all the chickens, who start taking over the Kikiwaka Ranch. Meanwhile, Winnie and Jake hear that their favorite gymnasts Jordan Chiles and Katelyn Ohashi are in town to do a gymnast exposition and plan to get in to meet them. At the same time, Parker prepares for his first act as the Mayor of Dusty Tush. Guest stars: Brandilyn Cheah as Scout, Jordan Chiles as herself, Katelyn Ohashi as herself
149	10	"Me, Myself, and A.I."	Miranda May	David Booth	September 24, 2023	710
Guest star: JC Currais as Big Dan
150	11	"The Glitching Hour"	Robbie Countryman	Annie Nishida	September 29, 2023	711
Guest star: Grace Lu as Megan
151	12	"Friends in Snow Places"	Dave Cove	Teleplay by : Valerie Ahern & Eric Schaar; Story by : Christian L. Scott	December 1, 2023	712
Guest star: Brandilyn Cheah as Scout
152	13	"Yodel Recall"	Jason Shipman	Clayton Sakoda	July 5, 2024	713
Guest stars: Armand Munoz as Dale, Angela Malhotra as Carol
153	14	"Game of Throne"	Phill Lewis	Roxy Simons	July 5, 2024	714
Guest stars: Randy Savvy as Himself, Carlton Hook as Himself, Vedanten Naidoo as Nicky
154	15	"Busk a Move"	Phill Lewis	Nick Geisler	July 12, 2024	715
Guest stars: Jordan Clark as Victoria Vance, DeeDee Rescher as Iris
155	16	"Free Balls and Pickleball"	Patrick Maloney	Christian L. Scott	July 12, 2024	716
Special guest stars: Raini Rodriguez as Barb Barca, Rico Rodriguez as Baxter Barca
156	17	"And the Kiki Goes To..."	Morenike Joela Evans	Effie Antigone & Carly Garber	July 19, 2024	717
Guest star: Brandilyn Cheah as Scout
157	18	"Iguana Be Best Man"	Keisha Stewart	David Booth	July 19, 2024	718
Guest stars: Janice LeAnn Brown as Frankie, Zehra Fazal as Tish, Siri Miller as Andrea
158	19	"License to Cattle Drive"	Mallory James Mahoney	Vanessa Mancos	July 26, 2024	719
Guest stars: Thom Rivera as The Marshal, Christine Rodriguez as Esther
159	20	"Cold Feet, Hot Brobblers"	Erika Kaestle	Valerie Ahern & Eric Schaar	July 26, 2024	720
Guest stars: Jordan Clark as Victoria, Keanush Tafreshi as Ryder McCoy, Bijan Robinson as Himself
160	21	"Slapshot to the Heart"	Jody Margolin Hahn	Erin Dunlap	August 2, 2024	721
Guest stars: Keanush Tafreshi as Ryder McCoy, Alessandra de Sa Pereira as Lucy, Keivonn Woodard as Miles
161	22	"Happy Trails"	Bob Koherr	Erin Dunlap	August 2, 2024	722
Special guest stars: Raphael Alejandro as Matteo, Will Buie Jr. as Finn, Scarlett Estevez as Gwen, Shelby Simmons as Ava Guest stars: Thom Rivera as The Marshal, Jordan Clark as Victoria, Brandilyn Cheah as Scout, Keanush Tafreshi as Ryder
