= Adventures in Babysitting (2016 film) =

2016 TV film directed by John Schultz

- Promotional poster
- Based on: Adventures in Babysitting by David Simkins
- Written by: Tiffany Paulsen
- Directed by: John Schultz
- Starring: Sabrina Carpenter; Sofia Carson
- Music by: Richard Gibbs
- Country of origin: United States
- Original language: English

Production
- Executive producer: Michelle Manning
- Producer: Shawn Williamson
- Cinematography: Charles Minsky
- Editor: Lisa Binkley
- Running time: 93 minutes
- Production company: Bad Angels Productions

Original release
- Network: Disney Channel
- Release: June 24, 2016

Adventures in Babysitting is a 2016 American adventure comedy television film directed by John Schultz and starring Sabrina Carpenter and Sofia Carson. It is a remake of the 1987 film of the same name. The film premiered on Disney Channel in the United States and Canada on June 24, 2016, and is the 100th Disney Channel Original Movie.

== Plot ==
Jenny Parker and Lola Perez are both 19 and have a passion for photography, though their personalities are very different. They meet after becoming finalists for a photography internship and accidentally switching phones at their interview. Professor Helen Anderson calls Jenny's phone, begging for a last-minute babysitter. Lola takes the job when she gets served with a parking ticket from Officer James. Jenny's crush Zac Chase calls to invite Jenny to a concert, but Lola dismisses him to flirt with Officer James. Zac mistakenly believes that Jenny is not interested in him, so he takes another girl named Dominique Cassidy to the concert instead.

Jenny and Lola arrive at the Coopers' and the Andersons' for their respective babysitting jobs. Lola and Jenny realize they have each other's phones, and Jenny goes to find Lola and switch them back. By that time, 14-year-old Trey Anderson has snuck out to go to a concert. Jenny, Lola, and the other children journey to a crooked pawn shop in the city to track Trey down, but find that he has already left with his friends. In the shop, 10-year-old Bobby accidentally lets a rare ferret loose and Lola takes a picture of the commotion for her photography portfolio. Since trafficking the ferret is illegal, pawn shop owners Tiny and Scalper chase the six kids out of the store and attempt to delete the photo from Lola's camera. The group finds that their car is being towed, and learns they have until midnight to pay off the $100 fine. They find Trey, and Lola suggests selling the ticket at the concert to pay the fine.

Tiny and Scalper track them down, but stop short of revealing themselves when Lola is arrested for scalping. As they wait at the police station, Jenny is horrified to learn that 13-year-old Emily secretly dyed her hair and got a tattoo, and angrily reprimands her. Feeling hurt, Emily calls and leaves a voicemail to her mom explaining the trouble they are in. In the interrogation room, Lola meets Officer James. He scolds her for trying to scalp the ticket. Lola finally realizes her impulsiveness has consequences and begs to be let free to make things right. Meanwhile, in the lobby, 8-year-old AJ meets her roller derby idol Jailer Swift when Swift and her derby team are brought in on charges of disorderly conduct. Lola is cleared of all charges, but when she goes to rejoin the others, the derby team starts fighting among themselves and provides a distraction for the seven kids to get away. Tiny and Scalper chase after AJ, while the group steals Tiny and Scalper's car and follows them.

After escaping, the group accidentally enters a concert where they are forced to rap. When they leave, 7-year-old Katy remembers that her mother keeps $100 in her coat, and they all sneak into the local planetarium, where the Coopers and Andersons are attending a party, to steal it. The Coopers hear Emily's message and head to the police station to check on their children. Tiny and Scalper are caught by security and the ferret is seized.

Once Lola retrieves the money, they sneak out without being spotted by the adults. Tiny and Scalper are arrested and the ferret is taken to an animal shelter. Lola jokes that Jenny's night was more interesting than going to a concert with Zac, and Jenny finally learns why Zac has suddenly become distant. She becomes angry with Lola, but Lola suggests driving to the concert to explain everything. Lola trades her precious camera (but keeps the memory card) for Jenny's admission so Jenny and Zac can reconcile. Zac explains that Dominique has a boyfriend and Jenny is thrilled. Zac drives the group to the tow lot to retrieve the car. They all then race home ahead of the parents. Once they return, Jenny, Katy and Emily return to the Coopers' as the Andersons arrive home, where Lola immediately covers up for everyone; Jenny does the same.

Zac and Jenny start dating, much to the delight of Katy and Emily, who have been looking on. Lola gets her driver's license back from Officer James, who asks her out. Lola and Jenny are seen to have adopted some of each others' traits, and Jenny declines the photography scholarship, giving it to Lola, who begins a relationship with Officer James. Jenny leaves for a date with Zac while Lola looks at the picture of her and Jenny one last time before closing it in a box.

In a mid-credits scene, Lola sends the pictures to Katy, Emily, AJ, Bobby, Trey, Jenny, and accidentally Helen.

== Cast ==
- Sabrina Carpenter as Jenny Parker, Emily and Katy's babysitter
- Sofia Carson as Lola Perez, Trey, Bobby and AJ's babysitter
- Nikki Hahn as Emily Cooper, Katy's older sister who dyed her hair green
- Mallory James Mahoney as Katy Cooper, Emily's younger sister who dresses like a princess
- Max Gecowets as Trey Anderson, the eldest son who snuck out to a concert
- Jet Jurgensmeyer as Bobby Anderson, the middle son and chef prodigy
- Madison Horcher as AJ Anderson, the youngest daughter and a huge fan of roller derby
- Kevin Quinn as Zac Chase, Jenny's love interest and later boyfriend
- Gillian Vigman as Helen Anderson, a science professor and Trey, Bobby, and AJ's mother
- Gabrielle Miller as Donna Cooper, Emily and Katy's mother
- Michael Northey as Tiny, a fat man with a hat who runs a pawn shop
- Ken Lawson as Scalper, a skinny guy with a hooded jacket on his head who scalps tickets
- Max Lloyd-Jones as Officer James, a rookie cop and Lola's new boyfriend
- Kevin O'Grady as Barry Cooper, Emily and Katy's father
- Hugo Ateo as Hal Anderson, Trey, Bobby, and AJ's father

== Production ==
=== Filming ===
Filming began on March 2, 2015 in Vancouver, British Columbia and wrapped on April 18, 2015. The first teaser was released on October 9, 2015 during the DCOM premiere of Invisible Sister. The first official trailer was released on February 12, 2016 during an episode of Girl Meets World, which also stars Sabrina Carpenter.

=== Screenplay ===
Tiffany Paulsen wrote the film's screenplay. It was presumed that the remake was scrapped due to years of inactivity. However, on January 9, 2015, Disney announced that the remake would go forward.

=== Casting ===
Raven-Symoné was going to star in the remake but decided to withdraw due to other projects. Miley Cyrus was also rumored to be attached to the project, but later denied involvement. Sabrina Carpenter and Sofia Carson were cast on January 9, 2015. Kevin Quinn, Nikki Hahn, Mallory James Mahoney, Madison Horcher, Jet Jurgensmeyer, Max Gecowets, and Max Lloyd-Jones were cast on August 31, 2015. Also announced the same day were Gillian Vigman, Alissa Skovbye, Arielle Tuliao, Kevin O'Grady, Lisa MacFadden, Ken Lawson, Jasmine Chan, Kathryn Kirkpatrick, Teana-Marie Smith, Michael Roberds, Simon Chin, J.C. Williams, Hugo Ateo, Raf Rogers, Morgan Tanner as Dancer, Curtis Albright, Oliver M. Smith, Kwasi Thomas, Joshua Morettin, Matthew Hoglie, and John Specogna.

== Broadcast ==
Adventures in Babysitting premiered on Disney Channel in the United States and Canada on June 24, 2016, with the series premiere of Bizaardvark as its lead-out. The film was available on the Disney Channel app and video on demand on June 17, 2016, ahead of the television premiere. As the network considered Adventures in Babysitting to be the 100th entry in its original movie franchise, Disney Channel announced that it would broadcast each previous movie to lead towards the premiere. The promotion began with a marathon of 53 popular entries in the series over the Memorial Day long weekend, followed by airings of the remainder throughout June.

== Ratings ==
The premiere of the movie attracted 3.45 million viewers.
