= Miguel Cruz Carretero =

Spanish director

Miguel Cruz
- Born: Miguel Cruz Carretero; August 29, 1974 (age 51); Barcelona
- Occupation(s): Director, Professor
- Years active: 2000-present (Director); 2010-present (Professor)

Miguel Cruz Carretero is a Spanish director, writer and producer based in Los Angeles with credits in more than 200 TV episodes including the sitcom Aída and Caiga quien caiga. His first feature film: VULNERABLES, is an independent feature that opened theatrically in Spain and Latin America. The film was 4th at the Peruvian Box-office and acquired by Sundance Channel, TVE and other TV Networks.

In Los Angeles, he has worked as executive producer in development for FOX's remake of the Argentinian Hit Permitidos, directed DISNEY's Multicam Comedy BUNK'D

Cruz is a Fulbright Scholar, and teaches Directing and Acting in the graduate programs at the New York Film Academy, King Juan Carlos University., and Nebrija University
