= Bunk'd =

American television series

- Genre: Comedy
- Created by: Pamela Eells O'Connell
- Starring: Peyton List; Karan Brar; Skai Jackson; Miranda May; Kevin Quinn; Nathan Arenas; Nina Lu; Mallory James Mahoney; Raphael Alejandro; Will Buie Jr.; Shelby Simmons; Scarlett Estevez; Israel Johnson; Trevor Tordjman; Shiloh Verrico; Alfred Lewis; Luke Busey
- Theme music composer: Steve Hampton; John Adair; Paul Bessenbacher; Brad Hamilton
- Opening theme: "Kikiwaka" by Kevin Quinn
- Composers: John Adair & Steve Hampton
- Country of origin: United States
- Original language: English
- No. of seasons: 7
- No. of episodes: 161 (list of episodes)

Production
- Executive producers: Pamela Eells O'Connell; Adam Lapidus; Phil Baker; Erin Dunlap; David Booth; Eric Schaar & Valerie Ahern; Miranda May
- Producers: Mike Montesano; Ted Zizik; Shari Tavey; Clayton Sakoda; Jason Shubb
- Cinematography: Gary W. Scott
- Camera setup: Multi-camera
- Running time: 21–23 minutes
- Production companies: Bon Mot Productions; It's a Laugh Productions; That's Not So Funny Productions; A Little Too You

Original release
- Network: Disney Channel
- Release: July 31, 2015 – August 2, 2024

Related
- Jessie

Bunk'd is an American comedy television series created by Pamela Eells O'Connell that originally aired on Disney Channel from July 31, 2015 to August 2, 2024. The series is a spinoff of Jessie and for the first three seasons includes returning stars Peyton List, Karan Brar, and Skai Jackson, as well as Miranda May who has starred over the series' entire run.

== Plot ==
Emma, Ravi, and Zuri leave New York City and head off to Moose Rump, Maine, to spend the summer at Camp Kikiwaka, where their parents met as teenagers. The Ross children and their new friends try their best to adapt to their lives at the camp, which was founded by Jedediah Swearengen and is named after a legendary Bigfoot-like creature that lives in the nearby forest. The camp has a notorious reputation of staying open despite violating various health code and safety regulations.

In "We Didn't Start the Fire", several cabins are destroyed by a fire after a candle is left unattended. In "We Can't Bear It", the Ross children return with a new generation of campers to find the cabins were never rebuilt and Gladys ran away with the insurance money. These children include pageant girl Destiny, cautious boy Mateo, and Lou's messy second cousin Finn. The Ross children then convince their parents to buy Camp Kikiwaka and put them in charge. Eventually, Emma, Ravi, and Zuri agree to sell the camp to Lou while they go pursue their dream jobs. In "Who da Boss? Lou da Boss!" Lou is now in charge of Camp Kikiwaka. While Lou gains Ava and Noah as fellow counselors, Destiny, Mateo, and Finn gain Gwen as a fellow camper.

In "R.V. Having Fun Yet?", new character Parker Preston, who is the great-grandson of Jedediah's partner "Hatchet Joe" Preston who co-owned the Camp Kikiwaka in the past, is introduced. Now Parker has arrived to become the co-owner and improve Camp Kikiwaka in appearance and camper attendance.

In the sixth season, Lou, Parker, Noah, and Destiny head to Dusty Tush, Wyoming, to open up a new camp at a dude ranch, which they purchased from The Marshall. There they encounter another new generation of campers, including fearless daredevil Winnie, enthusiastic cowboy-wannabe Bill, and video-game fanatic Jake.

In the seventh season, Lou, Parker, her right-hand man, and counselors Destiny and Noah accompany her on the final adventure at Kikiwaka Ranch. Winnie the daredevil, gamer Jake, and cowboy Bill are also returning for an exciting summer filled with new experiences.

== Episodes ==
Season	Episodes	Originally released	
Season	Episodes	First released	Last released
1	21	July 31, 2015	May 20, 2016
2	21	August 23, 2016	May 24, 2017
3	16	June 18, 2018	September 21, 2018
4	30	June 20, 2019	July 24, 2020
5	21	January 15, 2021	August 6, 2021
6	30	June 10, 2022	May 21, 2023
7	22	July 23, 2023	August 2, 2024

== Cast and characters ==
=== Main ===
The main characters during seasons 1–2: Tiffany, Xander, Zuri, Emma, Ravi, Jorge, and Lou.

- Peyton List as Emma Ross (main, seasons 1–3; guest, season 5), the oldest of the Ross children and counselor-in-training in Cabin Woodchuck. She is shown to have a unique sense of fashion. She becomes manager of the camp in the third season. By the end of the third season, she becomes a supermodel in Milan for her mother's clothing line. Emma later returns to Camp Kikiwaka in "Lou's Still the Boss, But Now There's a Ross" to visit Lou while originally laying low after her disastrous start on the runway for her debut fashion line led to her accidentally falling onto Beyoncé and then running off. Lou, Destiny, and Ava are able to help her regain her confidence to try that fashion line debut again.
- Karan Brar as Ravi Ross (seasons 1–3), an extremely smart counselor-in-training in Cabin Grizzly. The second-youngest of the Ross children, he brings his pet Asian water monitor Mrs. Kipling to camp. In the third season, he becomes camp chef and lead male counselor. By the end of the third season, Ravi is accepted into a scientific fellowship.
- Skai Jackson as Zuri Ross (seasons 1–3), a sweet yet sharp, sarcastic, and talkative girl. She is the youngest of the Ross children and is a camper in Cabin Woodchuck. By the end of the third season, Zuri becomes an intern at her father's filming studio.
- Miranda May as Lou Hockhauser, a highly enthusiastic farm girl and Emma's friend. She is the head counselor of Cabin Woodchuck and is a longtime friend of Xander. In the fourth season, she becomes the head director of Camp Kikiwaka. In "Water Under the Dock", her full name is revealed to be Louella Dorcas Hockhauser. In season six, Lou becomes the co-owner of Kikiwaka Ranch.
- Kevin Quinn as Xander (seasons 1–2), the popular head counselor of Cabin Grizzly and resident musician. He is a longtime friend of Lou and becomes the love interest for Emma.
- Nathan Arenas as Jorge (seasons 1–2), a bespectacled boy of Hispanic descent who is Ravi's friend and a camper in Cabin Grizzly. He is shown to be very messy, unclean, and calls people "weird". Jorge once claimed that he was abducted by aliens.
- Nina Lu as Tiffany (seasons 1–2), a young girl camper of Chinese descent whom Zuri befriends. She has an overbearing mother who expects a lot out of her.
- Mallory James Mahoney as Destiny Baker (seasons 3–7), a girl who has won almost all of the beauty pageants she has competed in. She is also very competitive and wants to win at all costs. During season six at Kikiwaka Ranch, Destiny becomes a counselor for Mustang Cabin.
- Raphael Alejandro as Matteo Silva (seasons 3–5; guest, season 7), a cautious boy who can find danger in any situation, packs spider and snake bite kits, would rather not be at Camp Kikiwaka, and speaks Portuguese when he is either scared or emotional. In "Happy Trails", Matteo is shown to have become a camp counselor at Camp Kikiwaka and is applying for a college while still in a relationship with Gwen.
- Will Buie Jr. as Finn Sawyer (main, seasons 3–5; guest, seasons 6–7), Lou's second cousin and a messy boy who does not care about hygiene, washing his clothes, or using his toothbrush. In "By All Memes", his last name is revealed to be Sawyer. In "Finn It to Win It", Finn visits the Kikiwaka Ranch to undergo counselor training. In "Happy Trails", Finn is now a counselor at Camp Kikiwaka.
- Shelby Simmons as Ava King (seasons 4–5; guest, season 7), a teenager from the big city and new counselor who has never camped before. In "Happy Trails", Ava is revealed to have become the camp director of Camp Kikiwaka even though she considers herself to be a "camp overlord".
- Scarlett Estevez as Gwen Flores (main, season 4; guest, seasons 5, 7), a young girl who has lived off the grid all her life and was previously home-schooled by her parents. In the fifth season, Gwen's family has moved to the city and she is unable to attend Camp Kikiwaka, though she still texts Destiny advice on how to operate in the city. She later visits the camp in "Crushin' It" and reconnects with her friends. In "Happy Trails," Gwen is now a counselor at Camp Kikiwaka, is still in a relationship with Matteo, and developed some road rage.
- Israel Johnson as Noah Lambert (seasons 4–7), a teenager from Los Angeles and new counselor who is an expert actor. During season six at Kikiwaka Ranch, Noah becomes a counselor.
- Trevor Tordjman as Parker Preston (seasons 5–7), the great-grandson of Camp Kikiwaka's co-founder "Hatchet Joe" Preston. Having been cut off by his parents for his different bad business ideas, Parker arrives at Camp Kikiwaka in his R.V. to become the co-owner of Camp Kikiwaka and use some of his ideas to improve it which often puts him at odds with Lou. During season six, Parker becomes the co-owner of Kikiwaka Ranch.
- Shiloh Verrico as Winnie (seasons 6–7), a fearless girl who earned the nickname Wild Winnie by breaking the rules and occasionally blowing things up.
- Alfred Lewis as Bill (seasons 6–7), a no-nonsense descendant of famous cowboy Bill Pickett who prefers roping cattle to hanging out with friends.
- Luke Busey as Jake (seasons 6–7), a laid-back, easy-going boy who also happens to be a video-gaming fanatic.

=== Recurring ===
- Mary Scheer as Gladys (seasons 1–2), the strict proprietor of Camp Kikiwaka who is a descendant of Jedediah Swearengen. She has been jealous of Christina Ross ever since Christina had "stolen" Morgan from her. Since then, Gladys has been unsuccessful at getting a boyfriend as most people she tries to romance end up avoiding her in various ways. By the third season, it is mentioned that Gladys has left Moose Rump for good and took the insurance money for the burned-down cabins, leaving the Ross children to gain ownership of the camp.
- Tessa Netting as Hazel (seasons 1–2; guest, season 4), the head counselor of Camp Kikiwaka and the main counselor of Weasel Cabin who was then demoted to CIT after accidentally burning down Woodchuck and Grizzly Cabins. She is the niece of Gladys (who share the same problem with men) and descendant of Jedidiah Swearengen. She seeks to steal Xander's affection away from Emma. By the end of second season, Hazel is demoted to counselor in training after it is revealed her candle burned down the cabins. In the episode "Inn Trouble," Hazel resurfaced where she was looking for the time capsule that she and Lou buried when they were younger.
- Casey Campbell as Murphy (seasons 1–3), the camp chef who is responsible for the terrible food and is Gladys' on and off love interest. Though gruff and gross, Murphy also ends up involved in many of the children's hijinks. All of his known cooking includes food from the garbage, roadkill, and expired (possibly due to the camp's budget being poor). In the season three episode "By All Memes", it was revealed that Murphy resigned from working at Camp Kikiwaka and got a job as a chef at Camp Kikiwaka's rival Camp Champion where his cooking is actually good.
- Nate Stone as Timmy (seasons 1–3), a camper who was kicked out because his parents' check bounced and has never gotten picked up by his parents. He is eager to get in the camp, but he always fails, resulting in him getting lost in the woods and remaining "forgotten", but in "Up, Up and Away", he decides to give up and be adopted by the Kikiwaka and her child.
- Lincoln Melcher as Griff (season 2), a juvenile delinquent who is placed in Grizzly Cabin as part of his juvenile hall's Nature Rehabilitation Program during the second season. He eventually decided to change his ways and is now Xander's adopted brother to avoid going back to juvie.
- Lily Mae Silverstein as Lydia (seasons 2–3), a camper from Weasel Cabin. Lydia is known for a very dark look such as black lipstick and a bandana, and her aggressive demeanor similar to her followers.
- Raini Rodriguez as Barb Barca (seasons 4–5, 7), the director of Camp Champion and professional power walker who is Lou's longtime rival. The episode "Cramped Champions" reveals that her last name is Barca. In season 7, Barb has relocated to her family's cabin in Dusty Tush after losing her job at Camp Champion for finishing the speed walking race in second place.
- Kyriana Kratter as Nadine (season 5), a member of the Pee-Wee Waka day camp program who likes pretending she is a superhero.
- Thom Rivera as The Marshal (seasons 6–7), the former owner of the property where Kikiwaka Ranch is located. He is also an entrepreneur, a museum curator, a county judge, and a justice of the peace.
- Jordan Clark as Victoria Vance (seasons 6–7), a dance teacher and proprietor of Dusty Tush's dancing school who becomes Preston's love interest.
- Brandilyn Cheah as Scout (season 7), a camper in Kikiwaka Ranch's Mustang Cabin who lived on a Nature Preserve with her family and has the traits of the different animals that lived there.

=== Notable guest stars ===
- Cameron Boyce as Luke, the brother of Emma, Ravi, and Zuri who was in summer school at the start of the series and occasionally visits them
- Kevin Chamberlin as Bertram, the butler of the Ross family
- Christina Moore as Christina, the mother of the Ross siblings and a Camp Kikiwaka alumna
- Jerry Trainor as Dave, the boyfriend of Finn's mother
- Raven-Symoné as Raven
- Anneliese van der Pol as Chelsea
- Issac Ryan Brown as Booker
- Navia Robinson as Nia
- Jason Maybaum as Levi
- Sky Katz as Tess
- Meg Donnelly as Priscilla Preston, the successful twin sister of Parker
- Jordan Chiles as herself
- Katelyn Ohashi as herself
- Rico Rodriguez as Baxter Barca, the more successful brother of Barb
- Bijan Robinson as himself, a football player for the Atlanta Falcons who was supposed to be the DJ at Parker and Victoria's wedding

== Production ==
The series is a spinoff of Jessie. Bunk'd was renewed for a second season by Disney Channel on February 29, 2016. The second season premiered on August 23, 2016.

The series was renewed for a third season by Disney Channel on August 31, 2017. On June 1, 2018, it was announced that Peyton List, Karan Brar, Skai Jackson, and Miranda May would be returning for the third season and that Raphael Alejandro, Will Buie Jr., and Mallory Mahoney would be joining the cast. The third season premiered on Disney Channel on June 18, 2018. In March 2018, actress Skai Jackson stated in an interview that she was leaving Disney and that Bunk'd would end with the third season. In September 2018, it was confirmed in a report from The Hollywood Reporter that Peyton List would also leave the series after the conclusion of its third season.

On November 15, 2018, it was announced by Disney Channel that the series had been renewed for a fourth season. Miranda May, Mallory James Mahoney, Raphael Alejandro, and Will Buie Jr. would return for the fourth season, with new unannounced cast also set to star alongside them, while Peyton List, Karan Brar, and Skai Jackson would not be returning to the series. Additionally, Andi Mack's Phil Baker and Erin Dunlap were to take over as executive producers in the fourth season. Production for the fourth season began in March 2019. On March 18, 2019, it was announced that production on the fourth season had commenced and that Israel Johnson, Shelby Simmons, and Scarlett Estevez had been added to the cast of the series. On May 10, 2019, it was announced that the fourth season would premiere on June 20, 2019.

On February 24, 2020, it was announced by Disney Channel that the series had been renewed for a fifth season. Executive producer Erin Dunlap will serve as the sole showrunner for the fifth season. In addition, all of the cast from the fourth season, with the exception of Scarlett Estevez, is set to return. On August 26, 2020, it was announced that Trevor Tordjman from Zombies and Zombies 2 would join the main cast for the fifth season as Parker Preston. Disney Channel announced on December 11, 2020, that the fifth season would premiere on January 15, 2021.

On December 15, 2021, it was announced that the series was renewed for a sixth season, subtitled Learning the Ropes, with Miranda May, Trevor Tordjman, Mallory James Mahoney, and Israel Johnson returning. New to the series are Shiloh Verrico as Winnie, Luke Busey as Jake, and Alfred Lewis as Bill. The sixth season premiered on June 10, 2022, and consisted of 30 episodes.

On October 11, 2022, Disney Channel renewed the series for a seventh season. On May 7, 2023, it was announced that production had been halted on the seventh season due to the 2023 Writers Guild of America strike. On June 22, 2023, it was announced that the seventh season would premiere on July 23, 2023. On December 29, 2023, it was announced that Disney Channel had extended the seventh season to 22 episodes and revealed that it would be the final season.

== Broadcast ==
In Canada, the series premiered on Disney Channel Canada on the second day of the channel's launch on September 2, 2015. The series premiered on Disney Channels in the United Kingdom and Ireland on November 20, 2015, and premiered in Australia and New Zealand on January 14, 2016.

== Reception ==
=== Ratings ===
Viewership and ratings per season of Bunk'd
Season	Episodes	First aired		Last aired		Avg. viewers (millions)
Season	Episodes	Date	Viewers (millions)	Date	Viewers (millions)	Avg. viewers (millions)
1	21	July 31, 2015	4.24	May 20, 2016	1.25	1.76
2	21	August 23, 2016	1.35	May 24, 2017	0.99	1.23
3	16	June 18, 2018	0.97	September 21, 2018	0.65	0.82
4	30	June 20, 2019	0.68	July 24, 2020	0.72	0.50
5	21	January 15, 2021	0.61	August 6, 2021	0.33	0.32

=== Accolades ===
Year	Award	Category	Nominee(s)	Result	Ref.
2019	Kids' Choice Awards	Favorite Funny TV Show	Bunk'd	Nominated	
2020	Kids' Choice Awards	Favorite Kids TV Show	Bunk'd	Nominated	
2020	Artios Awards	Outstanding Achievement in Casting - Children's Pilot and Series (Live Action)	Howard Meltzer, Salvatore Schiavon	Nominated	
2020	Daytime Creative Arts Emmy Awards	Outstanding Children's or Family Viewing Series	Bunk'd	Nominated	
2021	Artios Awards	Outstanding Achievement in Casting - Children's Pilot and Series (Live Action)	Howard Meltzer, Biz Urban	Nominated	
2021	Daytime Creative Arts Emmy Awards	Outstanding Casting for a Live-Action Children's Program	Bunk'd	Nominated	
2022	Children's & Family Emmy Awards	Outstanding Cinematography for a Live Action Multiple Camera Program	Gary Scott	Nominated	
2023	Children's & Family Emmy Awards	Outstanding Choreography	Bunk'd	Nominated	
2024	Artios Awards	Outstanding Achievement in Casting - Children and Family Pilot and Series - Live Action	Bunk'd	Nominated	
2024	Art Directors Guild Awards	Excellence in Production Design for a Muiti-Camera Series	Kelly Hogan	Nominated	
2025	Art Directors Guild Awards	Excellence in Production Design for a Muiti-Camera Series	Kelly Hogan	Nominated	
2025	Make-Up Artists & Hair Stylists Guild Awards	Best Hair Styling - Children and Teen Television Programming	Bunk'd	Nominated	
