= Mallory James Mahoney =

American child actress (born 2005)

- Born: January 31, 2005 (age 21); Fort Worth, Texas, U.S.
- Education: Texas Christian University
- Occupation: Actress
- Years active: 2014–present

Mallory James Mahoney (born January 31, 2005) is an American actress, who is known for her roles on the Disney Channel as Katy Cooper in the film Adventures in Babysitting (2016) and Destiny Baker in seasons 3–7 of the series Bunk'd (2018–2024), and playing Ainsley Riches on the Netflix series On My Block (2020).

== Education ==
Mahoney is a student at Texas Christian University and a member of Kappa Alpha Theta. She is a student journalist at ROXO Media House Productions, which covers TCU Horned Frogs news.

== Career ==
Mahoney expressed an interest in acting at the age of 4, and later began acting in 2014, first appearing in a Chuck E. Cheese commercial. After appearing in a number of short films, she starred as Katy Cooper in the Disney Channel Original Movie Adventures in Babysitting in 2016, the remake of the 1987 film of the same name. In the same year, she had a recurring role as Megan on the Rooster Teeth drama series Day 5, and starred in the Lifetime drama film Heaven Sent.

In 2018, Mahoney began starring as Destiny Baker on the Disney Channel series Bunk'd. In the same year, she began appearing as Mally on the series Jamall & Gerald. In 2020, she starred as Ainsley Riches on the Netflix teen-drama series On My Block.

== Filmography ==
Year	Title	Role	Notes
2014	Sober Companion	JoanJett	Television film
2014	Dig	Jenny	Short film
2016	Adventures in Babysitting	Katy Cooper	Television film
2016	Day 5	Megan	3 episodes
2016	Heaven Sent	Taylor	Television film
2018–2024	Bunk'd	Destiny Baker	Main role (season 3–7)
2018	Jamall & Gerald	Mally	Recurring role
2020	On My Block	Ainsley Riches	2 episodes
2020	Raven's Home	Destiny Baker	Episode: "Raven About Bunk'd"
2021	Disney's Magic Bake-Off	Herself	2 episodes
