= Pig Sty =

Television series

- Genre: Sitcom
- Created by: Dan Staley & Rob Long
- Written by: Dan Staley; Rob Long; Tom Leopold; Phil Baker; Drew Vaupen; Howard Margulies; Scott Krager; David Pavoni; Bob Sand; Shari Hearn
- Directed by: John Whitesell; Arlene Sanford; Rod Daniel; Tim Berry; Rob Schiller; Kim Friedman; Rick Beren
- Starring: Sean O'Bryan; Liz Vassey; Timothy Fall; Brian McNamara; Matt Borlenghi; David Arnott
- Composers: Christophe Beck; Jason Beck
- Country of origin: United States
- Original language: English
- No. of seasons: 1
- No. of episodes: 13

Production
- Executive producers: Dan Staley & Rob Long
- Producer: Tim Berry
- Running time: 30 minutes
- Production companies: Staley/Long Productions; Paramount Television

Original release
- Network: UPN
- Release: January 23 – May 15, 1995

Pig Sty is an American television sitcom created by Dan Staley and Rob Long that aired on UPN during the network's first season. The series premiered on January 23, 1995, ran on Monday nights, after Star Trek: Voyager and Platypus Man, and was cancelled after 13 episodes on May 15, 1995. Pig Sty was produced by Paramount Network Television.

== Premise ==
The show was about five male roommates sharing an apartment in New York City, and their female superintendent.

== Cast ==
- Brian McNamara as Randy Fitzgerald – Randy was a struggling writer who supported himself by tending bar. He was often frustrated by his inability to sell a single story. Randy also had an unrequited crush on the building's superintendent, Tess.
- Matthew Borlenghi as Johnny Barzano – Johnny was a young assistant district attorney. In the pilot, Johnny was engaged and moving out, forcing the others to find a fourth person to split the rent with. However, Johnny decided that his fiancée was too "clingy," called off the engagement, and tried to move back into the apartment. It was Randy who came up with the plan that would enable five guys to share a two-bedroom apartment.
- Timothy Fall as P.J. Morris – P.J. wanted to be a songwriter, however, he never sold any of his songs and, in fact, lived off a large trust fund. P.J. was often ridiculed by Randy for being a "trust fund baby". Every few months he would have dinner with his father to discuss his going into the family business, but P.J. always refused. His family obtained its wealth from the tobacco industry, thus P.J.'s name can be seen as a pun on the Philip J. Morris Company.
- David Arnott as Cal Evans – Cal was an unscrupulous advertising executive. He was known for having slovenly personal habits and for his love of smoking cigars. When Johnny tried to move back in, the other roommates initially tried to force out Cal because of his bad habits. However, Cal revealed that he had secretly put his name on the lease to prevent them from kicking him out. So instead, the group decided that Cal should move into the walk-in closet with P.J.'s dog. Cal graduated from college with a 1.0 GPA. He claimed that his favorite holidays were New Year's Day and St. Patrick's Day, because he liked to get girls really drunk so that they would have pity sex with him.
- Sean O'Bryan as Joe "Iowa" Dantley – Joe was a doctor and a transplanted Iowan starting his residency at a New York hospital. He was only called Joe in the pilot episode; afterwards the guys all referred to him by the nickname "Iowa." He was originally supposed to be the fourth roommate when Johnny moved out. However, when Johnny wanted to come back a deal had to be reached to accommodate the situation.
- Liz Vassey as Tess Gallaway – Tess was a struggling actress who worked as the building superintendent while waiting for her acting career to take off. Randy would regularly break things in the apartment so that Tess would have to come up and repair them. In one episode Randy got Iowa to take some lab mice from the hospital, forcing Tess to come and catch them; all in a futile attempt to spend more time with Tess. Although she was aware of Randy's crush on her, and that he was deliberately breaking objects, Tess did not return his affections. She believed that Randy was too immature for a serious relationship.

== Episodes ==
No.	Title	Directed by	Written by	Original release date	Prod. code
1	"...And This Little Piggy Moved Out"	John Whitesell	Dan Staley & Rob Long	January 23, 1995	001
2	"Beauty & the Beasts"	Arlene Sanford	Dan Staley & Rob Long and Tom Leopold	January 30, 1995	002
3	"Iowa vs. New York"	Arlene Sanford	Phil Baker & Drew Vaupen	February 6, 1995	004
4	"Mr. Nice Guy"	Rod Daniel	Howard Margulies	February 13, 1995	006
5	"Five Cards, No Stud"	Arlene Sanford	Scott Krager & David Pavoni	February 20, 1995	012
6	"The Ghost and Mr. Evans"	Tim Berry	Phil Baker & Drew Vaupen	February 27, 1995	011
7	"Party!!!"	Arlene Sanford	Tom Leopold	March 6, 1995	003
8	"Erin Go Barf"	Rob Schiller	Phil Baker & Drew Vaupen	March 13, 1995	009
9	"May I Borrow a Cup of Death"	Rod Daniel	Bob Sand	March 20, 1995	008
10	"Nightmare in 15C"	Kim Friedman	Howard Margulies	April 10, 1995	010
11	"The Maltese Falcone"	Rod Daniel	Scott Krager & David Pavoni	May 1, 1995	005
12	"Tess Makes the Man"	Rick Beren	Shari Hearn	May 8, 1995	007
13	"Leap into an Open Grave"	Arlene Sanford	Bob Sand	May 15, 1995	013

== Critical reception ==
The Los Angeles Times called the series "derivative" and that "Sharper writing could make it worthwhile viewing."

The New York Times wrote in its review that there was nothing terribly wrong with this sitcom.
