= Good Luck Charlie =

American sitcom

- Genre: Sitcom
- Created by: Phil Baker & Drew Vaupen
- Starring: Bridgit Mendler; Leigh-Allyn Baker; Bradley Steven Perry; Mia Talerico; Eric Allan Kramer; Jason Dolley
- Theme music composer: Jeannie Lurie; Chen Neeman; Aris Archontis
- Opening theme: "Hang In There Baby" by Bridgit Mendler
- Composers: Stephen R. Phillips & Tim P.
- Country of origin: United States
- Original language: English
- No. of seasons: 4
- No. of episodes: 97 (list of episodes)

Production
- Executive producers: Dan Staley; Phil Baker; Drew Vaupen
- Producer: Pixie Wespiser
- Camera setup: Videotape (filmized); Multi-camera
- Running time: 23 minutes
- Production company: It's a Laugh Productions

Original release
- Network: Disney Channel
- Release: April 4, 2010 – February 16, 2014

Related
- Best of Luck Nikki

Good Luck Charlie is an American sitcom that aired on Disney Channel from April 4, 2010, to February 16, 2014. It focuses on the Duncan family, a middle-class American family in Denver as they adjust to the births of their fourth and later fifth children, Charlotte "Charlie" (Mia Talerico) and Toby (Logan Moreau). In each episode, Teddy Duncan (Bridgit Mendler) adds to a video diary that contains advice for Charlie about their family and life as a teenager. Teddy tries to show Charlie what she might go through when she is older for future reference. Each video diary ends with Teddy (or another family member, even Charlie) saying the eponymous phrase, "Good luck, Charlie".

The series' creators, Phil Baker and Drew Vaupen, wanted to create a program that would appeal to entire families, not just children. Among other decisions, executives included adult-centric scenes and changed the series title from Oops to Love, Teddy and finally to Good Luck Charlie to ensure the series would appeal to all family members. Good Luck Charlie premiered on Disney Channel in the United States on April 4, 2010. A feature-length Christmas Disney Channel Original Movie based on the series, entitled Good Luck Charlie, It's Christmas!, premiered in December 2011. The series finale aired on February 16, 2014, with a one-hour episode. On April 3, 2011, an Indian adaptation of the series, titled Best of Luck Nikki, premiered on Disney Channel India.

== Premise ==
Set in Denver, Colorado, the series follows the Duncan family, who are still adjusting to the birth of their fourth child, Charlotte "Charlie" Duncan (Mia Talerico). When parents Amy (Leigh-Allyn Baker), a nurse, and Bob (Eric Allan Kramer), an exterminator, return to work, they ask their three older children—PJ (Jason Dolley), Teddy (Bridgit Mendler), and Gabe (Bradley Steven Perry)—to help raise their little sister. At the same time, Teddy, PJ, and Gabe try to deal with school and general social challenges in their lives.

The events in each episode become material for a video diary that Teddy is making for Charlie. Teddy hopes the videos will provide useful advice for Charlie after they have both grown up and Teddy has moved out. At the end of each video, she (and/or other cast members) says, "Good luck, Charlie" or may even say it indirectly such as "Wish them good luck, Charlie." During the movie, Teddy realizes that Amy is pregnant with her fifth child, and this story plot is brought into the series during the third season, when Amy gives birth to a baby boy, Toby. Each episode ends, after the video diary, with an event that is weird and usually cannot happen in real life.

== Episodes ==
Season	Episodes	Originally released	
Season	Episodes	First released	Last released
1	26	April 4, 2010	January 30, 2011
2	30	February 20, 2011	November 27, 2011
Film		December 2, 2011	
3	21	May 6, 2012	January 20, 2013
4	20	April 28, 2013	February 16, 2014

== Characters ==
=== Main ===
The season four cast of Good Luck Charlie (The Duncan family, from left to right), Mia Talerico as Charlie Duncan, Bradley Steven Perry as Gabe Duncan, Bridgit Mendler as Teddy Duncan, Leigh-Allyn Baker as Amy Duncan, Jason Dolley as PJ Duncan, Eric Allan Kramer as Bob Duncan and Logan Moreau as Toby Duncan

- Teddy Duncan (Bridgit Mendler), Charlie's only sister and the second-oldest Duncan sibling. Feeling that she will not be around as much when Charlie is grown, she produces and directs video diaries for her, hoping they will give her advice that will help her be successful as a teenager. She produces these video diaries at the end of every episode, and at the end of every video diary she says "Good luck Charlie". It was never mentioned what Teddy's middle initial R stands for.
- Amy B. Duncan (née Blankenhooper) (Leigh-Allyn Baker), Bob's wife and the mother of PJ, Teddy, Gabe, Charlie, and Toby. She works as a hospital nurse and is often portrayed as dutiful, protective and comedic. It is revealed in the movie that she is pregnant again with her fifth child.
- Gabriel B. "Gabe" Duncan (Bradley Steven Perry), the middle Duncan sibling, being both the younger brother of Teddy and PJ and the older brother of Charlie and Toby. He is initially disconcerted by Charlie's arrival and is the last one of the family to get used to her, until his older sister, Teddy, helps him. He is a prankster and troublemaker, (a rebellious teenager) and has a rivalry with their neighbor Mrs. Dabney, who is often the target of Gabe's pranks and stunts.
- Charlotte "Charlie" Duncan (Mia Talerico), the title character and the second-youngest Duncan sibling. She is generally portrayed as being happy, but can also be mischievous at times. Many of the Duncan family's adventures revolve around Charlie.
- Robert William "Bob" Duncan (Eric Allan Kramer), the father of Teddy, PJ, Gabe, Charlie, and Toby, and husband of Amy. He owns a pest control company, "Bob's Bugs Be Gone". He is very loving and seems to just agree with his wife; he also was the subject to jokes about his weight particularly from his son Gabe, but he lost a lot due to being fed up with it.
- Potty John "PJ" Duncan (Jason Dolley), the eldest Duncan sibling. He and Teddy often fight, although they care about each other, and he usually gets along well with his younger brother Gabe. He often appears awkward, somewhat careless, and childish, but on numerous occasions has been known to be resourceful, creative, and intelligent. He has also been shown to be a good cook. He and his best friend Emmett have their own band entitled "PJ and the Vibe". In season three, PJ moves into an apartment shared with Emmett.
- Toby Wan Kenobi Duncan (Jake Cinoa (season 3) and Logan Moreau) (season 4) is the youngest of the Duncan children, born in season 3.

=== Recurring ===
- Ivy Wentz (Raven Goodwin), Teddy's best friend, who is seen spending most of her time with Teddy at the Duncan's residence. She often accompanies Teddy on her dutiful, or personal, excursions.
- Mrs. Estelle Dabney (Patricia Belcher), the Duncans' strict and easily annoyed neighbor, who is often suspicious of Gabe, because his pranks and troublemaking are frequently directed towards her.
- Spencer Walsh (Shane Harper), Teddy's on-again, off-again boyfriend throughout the series, who she begins to date in the first season.
- Emmett (Micah Stephen Williams), PJ's best friend. He has a one-sided attraction to Teddy, though Teddy constantly rejects him. Emmett accompanies PJ on the drums in his band "PJ and the Vibe", and sometimes assists PJ on his problematic excursions.
- Debbie Dooley (Ericka Kreutz), the Duncans' neighbor who speaks with a strong Upper Midwestern accent.
- Beau Landry (Luke Benward), a later boyfriend of Teddy's who works for Bob's company after moving from Tennessee.
- Jo Keener (G. Hannelius), Gabe's tomboyish bully-turned-friend.
- Mary Lou Wentz (Ellia English), Ivy Wentz's mother and Amy Duncan's friend.
- Harry Wentz (William Allen Young), the husband of Mary Lou Wentz and the father of Ivy Wentz.
- Skyler (Samantha Boscarino), Teddy's friend and PJ's girlfriend.
- Jake (Tucker Albrizzi) is Gabe's empty-headed best friend.
- Toby Duncan (Logan and Jake Moreau), the fifth and youngest Duncan sibling.
- Karen (Brooke Dillman), Amy's boss at the hospital, who she holds a feuding relationship with.
- Vonnie (Cyrina Fiallo), Teddy's friend and classmate.
- Vern Hardy (Frank Collison), an employee at Bob's Bugs Be Gone and a friend of Bob. At work, Bob usually likes to tell him about his family. In Rat-A-Teddy, it is mentioned that Vern quit and started his own extermination company.

== Production ==
=== Development ===
A lot of the high-concept shows have kids in an extraordinary situation where the parent or adult takes a backseat, and sometimes the adult isn't as smart as the kid, or it's all about the kids putting one over on the adults. But we have a new show called "Good Luck Charlie" that has a very different kind of concept. It is very grounded, very relatable, and it's not about the parents being dumber than the kids. We try and mine as much comedy out of the parents as possible, but it doesn't mean the kids can't learn from the parents and get guidance from the parents.

— Adam Bonnett, senior Vice President of original programming for Disney.

Good Luck Charlie was created by Phil Baker and Drew Vaupen, who have been writing together since 1993 on shows ranging from Suddenly Susan to Sonny with a Chance. The pair aspired to create a program that would appeal to entire families rather than simply kids. Inspired by the success of reruns of shows such as Full House and George Lopez with young audiences, Vaupen and Baker turned to family sitcoms. "We wanted to do a show about a family, to bring back a family sitcom and make it about a real family, not wizards, nobody's a pop star, nobody has a TV show", said Vaupen, referring to Wizards of Waverly Place, Hannah Montana, and Sonny with a Chance. Veteran writer-producer Dan Staley (Cheers) later joined the show as executive producer. Disney's Gary Marsh said "because most network television abandoned the traditional sitcom, Disney has been able to snatch up a lot of experienced talent for behind the camera, including executive producer Dan Staley..."

The series was publicly announced in July 2009 with a press release announcing the first season order as well as the primary cast.

Good Luck Charlie's central family, the Duncans from Denver, Colorado, was carefully crafted for broad appeal. While the series is still told primarily through the view point of the Duncan children, the children's parents, Amy and Bob, are less on the periphery and writers attempt to add scenes that adult viewers can relate to. For example, in one scene in the pilot episode Amy confesses to Bob that she is overwhelmed with becoming a working new mother again. "She's not sure she can pull this off", says Bonnet. "And just playing that scene the way we did, a very real scene between husband and wife, kind of makes this show different". The writers also try to include jokes for adult viewers while remaining chaste enough for their young target audience. Unlike most previous Disney Channel series such as Sonny with a Chance, Hannah Montana, or Cory in the House, both parents are seen in the Duncan family. "It felt like the right time to have a show with two parents, to debunk the myth that Disney never has the mom in the picture", says Adam Bonnett, Senior Vice President of original programming for Disney Channel. "Because it is a myth".

Because a series about the rich and famous might alienate viewers in a troubled economy, the Duncans were made middle class. According to Gary Marsh, Entertainment President of Disney Channel Worldwide, "What we want to do is acknowledge the reality of the times in which we live, where two parents work, where kids are expected to help out around the house in meaningful ways. Real-life issues happen. Everyone isn't living 'The Life of Riley' all the time." Broadening Disney Channel's appeal was a concern when choosing the names of the characters and the title of the program. "You want a title that says, a) this is a sitcom and, b) this is something that will interest the main demographic but also we're trying to expand the Disney brand beyond just girls", Vaupen commented. The series' title was originally "Love, Teddy", the phrase Teddy had used to end her video diary entries during development. However, "Love, Teddy" immediately felt feminized and almost excludes boys", Vaupen said. "We also didn't want to have the word 'Baby' in the title because that would exclude certain people". The Duncan baby was originally named "Daisy" during development, but producers thought that "Charlie", which is generally a masculine name, would attract more boys.

=== Casting ===
As Good Luck Charlie is low concept and character-driven, "the actors not only had to carry the show, they also had to have "pitch-perfect" chemistry with each other to make the family dynamic believable". Bonnet says Disney Channel executives "just fell in love with" Bridgit Mendler, who stars as teenaged Teddy Duncan. "She has all the attributes of a Disney star", said Bonnet. Mendler had previously auditioned for Sonny with a Chance, and network executives wanted to find a role for her. Mendler first heard about Good Luck Charlie in late November 2008. After several rounds of auditions and cast reads, she finally secured the part in January 2009. Mendler and Jason Dolley, who plays Teddy's older brother PJ, have starred in preceding Disney Channel series and movies before both were cast in Good Luck Charlie; Mendler had a recurring role on Wizards of Waverly Place and Dolley starred in Cory in the House and numerous Disney Channel television movies. Variety magazine's Brian Lowry says their careers "[reflect] the Disney Channel's knack for identifying young performers and rolling them from one project to the next, in a fashion reminiscent of the old studio system". The character of PJ was initially called Casey.

Both Eric Allan Kramer, who plays Bob Duncan, and Leigh-Allyn Baker, who plays Amy Duncan, had also guest starred in preceding Disney Channel shows, and both Kramer and Baker had respectively guest starred in one episode each of the NBC sitcom My Name Is Earl, where Charlie writers Erika Kaestle & Patrick McCarthy had served as writers and supervising producers. Both Baker and Kramer were in the same episode of the NBC sitcom Will and Grace, entitled "Sour Balls". Baker says Disney had been "courting [her] for awhile to play a mom", but she had always felt too young. "I kind of feel like hey, you know what? When I'm done with this stint, I'll actually be the age everyone thinks I am to be able to play the part". Baker, who was a new mother herself, was nine months pregnant at the time she was auditioning for the role.

Like most series featuring baby actors, producers of Good Luck Charlie had originally intended to have identical twins play Charlie Duncan, the title character and the Duncans' new baby. Hiring two babies would allow for longer work days without violating child labor laws as well as the ability to substitute one child for the other if one was unavailable. However, the show makers were unsuccessful in finding the proper set of twins and decided to cast Mia Talerico instead. Marsh says casting Talerico, who was ten months old at the time of her casting for the role, was their highest risk while creating the show: "It's like flying without a net. She may have a bad day and we can't shoot and it'll cost us tens of thousands of dollars. But so far, so good. She's the most obedient actor I've ever worked with". The role of Toby was cast for the fourth season; Logan Moreau was selected for the role.

=== Filming ===
The Good Luck Charlie pilot, entitled "Study Date", was shot in February 2009, at Sunset Bronson Studios (where Hannah Montana was taped) and the series was picked up later that year. The show's production occurred at Sunset Bronson Studios in Los Angeles even though the show is set in Denver, Colorado. The house that was used as the Duncan's house throughout the show is located in Pasadena, CA. Starting with the second season, the series was taped at Los Angeles Center Studios, where Shake It Up was also taped. The show operated on a weekly schedule. Scripts for a new episode were issued on Monday before a read-through, Wednesdays were rehearsal and network run-through day, final scripts were issued on Thursday, and the episode was shot in front of a live studio audience on Friday night. According to Mendler, occasionally "episodes are too big to handle with a live audience [and are] taped without an audience, but mostly they're live".

Good Luck Charlie was renewed for a second season in July 2010, three months after its premiere. The third season was ordered in August 2011. In June 2013, Disney Channel announced that the series would end its run after four seasons. The finale aired on February 16, 2014, with a one-hour episode.

== Reception ==
The series earned positive reviews. Robert Lloyd of The Los Angeles Times described it as a "professional sitcom from sitcom professionals" with efficient jokes and typical sitcom characters, and situations which are "willfully arranged". Lloyd praised the series for offering a "contextually novel picture of a teenage girl taking care of her baby sister with a persuasive nonchalance and practical ease that transcends the strenuous comedy that surrounds it". Neal Justin of the Star Tribune said the "slapstick heavy, laugh-track fueled sitcom" had no redeeming qualities other than "keeping your 11-year-old sedated for a half hour". Rob Owen of the Pittsburgh Post-Gazette said Good Luck Charlie would appeal to kids, but not adults. "Parents have seen the same sort of show done before and better in ABC's 1980s-era TGIF lineup", wrote Owen. Contrarily, Brian Lowry of Variety magazine said Good Luck Charlie was "a surprisingly refreshing throwback to ABC's 'TGIF'-style sitcoms". He commented that while the series did not "push sitcom boundaries", it was "sprightly" and "pleasantly handled".

On June 20, 2013, Disney Channel announced that Season 4 Episode 19, "Down a Tree", would feature a married lesbian couple, making Good Luck Charlie the first Disney Channel series to do so. LGBT rights organization GLAAD as well as actresses Miley Cyrus and Evan Rachel Wood expressed their support and lauded Disney for the inclusion of the characters. By contrast, the One Million Moms division of the American Family Association protested and asked Disney not to air the episode. In a statement to TV Guide, a Disney Channel spokesperson stated that the episode was "developed to be relevant to kids and families around the world and to reflect themes of diversity and inclusiveness." Disney aired the episode as planned on January 26, 2014.

=== Viewership ===
The series premiered to 4.7 million viewers, making it the highest-rated series premiere for a Disney Channel Original Series since The Suite Life on Deck in 2008, and the week's highest-rated cable program. Maclean's reported that overall, the first season "has been doing about as well as Disney's more successful shows – The Suite Life and so on".

On June 24, 2012, the episode "Special Delivery" became the most watched episode ever of Good Luck Charlie, earning 7.48 million viewers, surpassing the episode "Snow Show (Part 1)" which had 7.24 million viewers as well as the episode "Good Luck Jessie NYC Christmas" that garnered 5.8 million viewers and the series' pilot episode "Study Date" which had 4.68 million viewers. The most-watched episode of the series was "Special Delivery" with 7.5 million viewers. The least watched episode was "The Unusual Suspects" with 1.9 million viewers. The most viewed episode in the United Kingdom and Ireland was "Special Delivery" with 602,000 viewers when it aired on October 12, 2012.

Season	List of episodes	First Aired	U.S. Viewers (in millions)	Last Aired	U.S. Viewers (in millions)	Average U.S. ratings (viewers in millions)
1	26	April 4, 2010	4.69	January 30, 2011	3.75	3.95 (for 25 of 26 episodes)
2	30	February 20, 2011	4.24	November 27, 2011	3.95	3.63 (for 28 of 30 episodes)
Film	Good Luck Charlie, It's Christmas!	December 2, 2011			6.88	
3	21	May 6, 2012	3.96	January 20, 2013	4.25	3.79
4	20	April 28, 2013	3.9	February 16, 2014	4.58	3.25

=== Awards and nominations ===
Award	Year (Note: The listed year refers to the date of the ceremony, not necessarily the year in which the corresponding season or episode aired.)	Category	Nominee(s)	Result	Ref.
Artios Awards	2013	Outstanding Achievement in Casting - Children's Series	Sally Stiner, Barbie Block	Nominated	
Artios Awards	2015	Outstanding Achievement in Casting - Children's Pilot and Series (Live Action)	Sally Stiner, Barbie Block	Won	
ASTRA Awards	2011	Favourite Program - International	Good Luck Charlie	Nominated	
British Academy Children's Awards	2011	BAFTA Kid's Vote: TV	Good Luck Charlie	Won	
British Academy Children's Awards	2012	BAFTA Kid's Vote: TV	Good Luck Charlie	Won	
British Academy Children's Awards	2013	BAFTA Kid's Vote: TV	Good Luck Charlie	Nominated	
GLAAD Media Awards	2015	Outstanding Individual Episode (In a Series Without a Regular LGBT Character)	Good Luck Charlie (for "Down a Tree")	Nominated	
Hollywood Teen TV Awards	2010	Teen Pick Actor: Comedy	Jason Dolley	Nominated	
Hollywood Teen TV Awards	2010	Teen Show Pick: Comedy	Good Luck Charlie	Nominated	
Kids' Choice Awards	2012	Favorite TV Show	Good Luck Charlie	Nominated	
Kids' Choice Awards	2012	Favorite TV Actress	Bridgit Mendler	Nominated	
Kids' Choice Awards	2013	Favorite TV Show	Good Luck Charlie	Nominated	
Kids' Choice Awards	2013	Favorite TV Actress	Bridgit Mendler	Nominated	
Kids' Choice Awards	2014	Favorite TV Show	Good Luck Charlie	Nominated	
Kids' Choice Awards	2014	Favorite TV Actress	Bridgit Mendler	Nominated	
Primetime Emmy Awards	2012	Outstanding Children's Program	Good Luck Charlie	Nominated	
Primetime Emmy Awards	2013	Outstanding Children's Program	Good Luck Charlie	Nominated	
Primetime Emmy Awards	2014	Outstanding Children's Program	Good Luck Charlie	Nominated	
Producers Guild of America Awards	2013	Outstanding Children's Program	Good Luck Charlie	Nominated	
Teen Choice Awards	2010	Choice TV: Female Breakout Star	Bridgit Mendler	Nominated	
Teen Choice Awards	2013	Choice TV Actress: Comedy	Bridgit Mendler	Nominated	
Young Artist Awards	2011	Best Performance in a TV Series (Comedy or Drama) - Supporting Young Actor	Bradley Steven Perry	Nominated	
Young Artist Awards	2011	Best Performance in a TV Series - Guest Starring Young Actor Ten and Under	Tucker Albrizzi	Won	
Young Artist Awards	2011	Best Performance in a TV Series - Guest Starring Young Actress 11–15	Ryan Newman	Nominated	
Young Artist Awards	2012	Best Performance in a TV Series - Supporting Young Actor	Bradley Steven Perry	Nominated	
Young Artist Awards	2012	Best Performance in a TV Series - Guest Starring Young Actor 18–21	Booboo Stewart	Nominated	
Young Artist Awards	2013	Best Performance in a TV Series - Guest Starring Young Actress 14–16	Isabella Palmieri	Won	
Young Artist Awards	2013	Best Performance in a TV Series - Guest Starring Young Actress Ten and Under	Gianna Gomez	Nominated	
Young Artist Awards	2014	Best Performance in a TV Series - Recurring Young Actress	Jaylen Barron	Nominated	
Young Artist Awards	2015	Best Performance in a TV Series - Recurring Young Actress 17–21	Jaylen Barron	Nominated	
Young Artist Awards	2015	Best Performance in a TV Series - Guest Starring Young Actor 11–14	Rio Mangini	Won	

== In other media ==
=== Film ===
After being ordered in July 2010, a feature-length Christmas Disney Channel Original Movie entitled Good Luck Charlie, It's Christmas! began production in March 2011. The film premiered December 2, 2011, on the Disney Channel. The film was directed by Arlene Sanford and written by Geoff Rodkey. The film takes place between the second and third seasons, which follows the Duncan family on their road trip to Amy Duncan's parents' house for Christmas.

=== Adaptations ===
An Indian adaptation of the show titled Best of Luck Nikki, premiered on Disney Channel India on April 3, 2011. Sheena Bajaj plays Dolly Singh, a character similar to that of Teddy Duncan, Ananya Kolvankar portrays Nikita "Nikki" Singh a character similar to that of Charlie and Gurdeep Kohli portrays Himani Singh, a character similar to that of Amy. The series ran for 4 seasons, 104 episodes and 3 special episodes and ended on April 16, 2016. A Pakistani adaptation of the show titled Peek-A-Boo Shahwaiz premiered on Play Entertainment from July 15, 2018.

=== Music ===
Although a soundtrack for the show was not released, several songs were produced for the show. "Hang in There Baby", performed by Bridgit Mendler, was written by Aris Archontis, Jeannie Lurie, and Chen Neeman. The premiere was on Radio Disney on March 26, 2010. "My Song for You", performed by Mendler and Harper, was featured in the Season 3 Christmas episode "A Duncan Christmas". "My Song for You" peaked at number two on Billboard Kid Digital Songs and three on Holiday Songs.
