= The Cherry Pick =

1997 film

De Kersenpluk
- Directed by: Arno Kranenborg
- Written by: Arno Kranenborg, Steven van Galen
- Release date: 9 January 1997
- Running time: 96 minutes
- Country: Netherlands
- Language: Dutch

The Cherry Pick or De Kersenpluk is a 1997 Dutch film directed by Arno Kranenborg.

== Plot ==
A 13-year-old boy reads a song about the departure of a migratory bird, written in scribbled handwriting in a cookbook which belonged to his grandmother, who passed away three years ago. The cookbook also contains a description of a plane trip she and her husband had planned, but never took. It is the time of the yearly cherry harvest when the boy is staying with his grandfather in the countryside of Drenthe. After the loss of his wife, his grandpa has gradually lost the will to live. As Grandpa gradually bids farewell to life, the boy discovers love for the first time that summer, and develops a quiet and fragile relationship with an 18-year-old girl. That winter, Grandpa dies, and the boy returns to the village to bury him. There he meets the young woman again. The encounter is brief, but long enough to make him realize that nothing can ever happen between him and her. The boy finally understands something of love.

== Cast ==
- Annelieke Bouwers
- Lukas Dijkema ... Jan Tabak
- Hainie Hemme ... Buschauffeur
- Meiko Kijf ... Kapper
- Ricky Koole ... Marie
- Dirk Kuik ... Taxichauffeur
- Fina Kuik ... Vrouw in schiettent
- Grietje Kuik ... Vrouw van zweefmolen
- Tini Osinga ... Oma
- Hennie Scheper ... Tweeling
- Willem Scheper ... Tweeling
- Anthony Starke ... Bedrijfsleider vliegveld
- Anton Starke ... Opa
- Berend Gouke Wendel ... Kruidenier
- Finbarr Wilbrink ... Jan
