= List of Barnyard characters =

The following is a list of characters who appearing in the 2006 film Barnyard and its Nickelodeon animated sequel television series Back at the Barnyard. The main characters in the film are unique in that they are animated as female milking cows, but are voiced over by male actors such as Kevin James and Sam Elliott. A total of 178 individual characters were built by animators for the film.

== Overall main characters ==
=== Otis ===
Otis (voiced by Kevin James in the film and Chris Hardwick in the series) is a male Holstein Friesian and the leader of the Barnyard. He is carefree, goofy and energetic, lacking responsibility and goofing off at any given opportunity. Despite this, Otis is highly intelligent and clever enough to come up with solutions to a problem and cares deeply about his friends and family. His superhero alter-ego is "Cowman". Despite being a bull, he has an udder.

=== Pip ===
Pip (voiced by Jeffrey Garcia) is a slight Mexican-accented wisecracking barn mouse who is Otis' best friend. He has a crush on Bessy, the sassy and sarcastic cow best friend of Abby, but she always rejects him. Pip's superhero alter-ego is Ratboy, the sidekick of Cowman. Pip is not usually involved with the gang's crazy schemes as much as Freddy, Peck, Pig, etc. are, but still, he usually comes along for the ride. Pip’s human disguise makes people question him, to which another animal says, 'He's the world's smallest man!'.

=== Freddy ===
Freddy (voiced by Cam Clarke) is a dimwitted ferret who is best friends with Peck, a rooster whom he's often tempted to eat; he used to be a carnivore, but then he's become a vegetarian to assimilate to the barnyard. However, in multiple times in the series, Freddy has shown gestures of or attempted to eat Peck, but every time when he tries, his attempt is thwarted, either intentionally or unintentionally. He is illiterate and has paranoid delusions and multiple personality disorders. It's notable how Freddy is the only character to almost be banished from the barnyard twice for crimes he never committed. Once for seemingly eating Peck when he was really trying to get some cinnamon buns Peck was going to trade for anti-itch cream and the other being framed for attacking his friends when it was really termites possessing a ventriloquist dummy. Also, he's a character who's been struck by lightning multiple times throughout the series, but once, he temporarily became a genius after being struck. Freddy's superhero alter-ego is "Paranoid Man".

=== Peck ===
Peck (voiced by Rob Paulsen) is an intelligent, but weak rooster who is best friends with Freddy and appears to be unaware of Freddy's recurring urges to eat him. He is considered to be extremely accident-prone, usually seen with a meteorite landing on him. Peck also explains the scientific parts to the audience to explain certain things that have happened. Peck seems to share a slight rivalry with Root, a larger, braver rooster on the barnyard, such as in "Pecky Suave", where we learn that Peck is shown to have a crush on a beautiful hen named Hanna. Peck's superhero alter-ego is "The Green Rooster".

=== Pig ===
Pig (voiced by Tino Insana) is a filthy and fat but well-meaning and friendly Danish Landrace pig and is the only character in the show to be named after his own species. He is very gluttonous and would eat anything, and he does so uncontrollably. In several episodes, Pig has various segments on the show that often interrupt the episode at its most important parts, with a few memorable segments are "Viewer Mail", "Ask Dr. Pig", a makeover segment and "Hollywood: Fact or Fiction?", which serves as filler time when an episode story is slightly shorter than its airtime. Pig has a strong, but quite strange, love for unicorns, and he wishes for one in the Christmas special, and is also the animal on the barnyard to dress up and disguise as humans the most times. He has a pet skunk named Skunky, and in one episode he is shown to sing in an angelic tenor. In another episode, after Pig sat on Pip, it left a mark, and the animals believe that he is related to the pet pigs of Prince Fripplehoot, telling by a birthmark shaped like a crown on his backside and is therefore royal, but the stuck-up pigs turn him down. His superhero alter-ego is "Mr. Hamtastic". Pig makes a cameo in the pilot episode of Planet Sheen along with Otis.

=== Duke ===
Duke (voiced by Dom Irrera) is a Border Collie who is in charge of the farmer's flock of intelligent sheep. Duke is clearly no match for the intellect possessed by the sheep he herds. Duke loves being a leader and being in charge of things, though no other animal wants him to be the leader because he is too irresponsible. This is first shown in the film after Ben dies and Duke wants to take his position as leader, but no other animal except his fellow dogs and a reluctant cat, wants him to take the place of Ben and wants Otis instead. In the series, Duke fancies himself as the barnyard's unofficial safety inspector and makes the barnyard watch a boring safety film once every year. Duke only enjoys dog activities, such as playing ball, so he doesn't hang around with Otis and his friends much, and as a result, sometimes feels lonely and left out.

=== Bessy ===
Bessy (voiced by Wanda Sykes) is a sassy and coarse Guernsey cow that has a tendency to yell and Abby's best friend (Daisy's in the film). She is not afraid to tell it like it is but ultimately means well and can occasionally be nice. She also knows how to pull a prank. Bessy finds Otis childish and idiotic, so she lives by insulting and assaulting him. Despite Otis being intelligent, she believes him to be dumb. Pip is in love with Bessy, but she always rejects him, despite taking advantage of this sometimes. Bessy is also seen implicating with other animals, such as Freddy. She also disguises herself very little and does not participate in Otis' plans or appreciate his intelligence at times. She had a son who floated away with balloons at a county fair. All she has to remember him by is his cowbell, which, strangely, Otis has because Otis is identical to her son due to their coat color. In addition, she is the principal of the farm's school program and the judge of its court.

=== Mrs. Beady ===
Noreen "Nora" Beady, more commonly known as Mrs, Beady, (voiced by Maria Bamford), is a housewife who lives close by to the farm. She is fully aware of the animals' anthropomorphism and regularly attempts to expose their antics to the world. She is neurotic and has become obsessed with exposing the animals, whose mischief often harms her. But no one else believes her because everyone else thinks she's insane, and whenever she attempts to expose the animals, they always find a way to sabotage her plan. In the pilot episode, it is revealed that Nora is the aunt of Snotty Boy, another enemy of animals.

=== Farmer Buyer ===
Farmer Buyer (voiced by Fred Tatasciore) is the vegan owner of the farm for whom Otis cares deeply. Still, when the animals need some time alone to work on a private project (a movie they are trying to make, a theme park they are attempting to build, etc.), that does not stop them from trying to drive him away with a prank phone call. In the film, whenever he sees the animals having human-like abilities, he is always kicked unconscious by Miles.

== Other main characters ==
=== Miles ===
Miles (voiced by Danny Glover) is an old mule who is a good friend of Ben's. When Ben dies, Miles is crucial in mentoring Otis who helps him assume a position of leadership and defeat the coyotes. He is absent in the series, although he makes a brief appearance in the opening.

=== Ben ===
Ben (voiced by Sam Elliott) is Otis' adoptive father who took him in when he found him in the meadow as a calf, and the former leader of the farm. In the film, he is killed by a pack of evil coyotes after successfully winning the fight with them. He is stricter than Otis, who enjoys partying. Daisy also names her baby calf after him at the end of the movie. Ben has only been mentioned on the show once in the episode "Big Top Barnyard", where Otis says he used to take him to the circus in childhood.

=== Daisy ===
Daisy (voiced by Courteney Cox) is a female cow and Otis' love interest in the film, before she and Bessy arrived at the farm, she used to live on another farm, had a husband, and was also pregnant with her first calf but a flash flood rolled into the farm. She and Bessy found refuge in a meadow, but when the storm was over, everybody had drowned. Later, the Farmer took her and Bessy, and they met the other animals. At the end of the film, she gives birth to her calf and names him after Otis' adoptive father, Ben. Daisy and her son neither appear nor are mentioned in the TV series; she was replaced with another female cow character named Abby in the series.

=== Dag ===
Dag (voiced by David Koechner) is a red coyote and the main antagonist in the film. He is the sadistic and underhanded leader of a large pack of coyotes who live in a local junkyard and prey on the farm's hens. Dag and his pack capture several of the chickens, but under Otis' leadership, the animals are able to free the chickens and scare away all the coyotes. Otis, after threatening to punch Dag and ordering him to never return, then proceeds to swing Dag out of the junkyard using his golf skills. Dag and his pack are never seen in the series, likely because of the former fearfully heeding Otis' warning.

=== Coyotes ===
The Coyotes are Dag's henchmen and the central antagonists in the film. At the end, they are scared away by Otis' friends.

=== Abby ===
Abby (voiced by Leigh-Allyn Baker) is a female cow. Abby is very athletic and excitable, allergic to petunias, has an obsessive-compulsive addiction for organizing, and loves cats. For some reason, she replaces Daisy, Otis' love interest from the movie. Abby also serves as the series' female protagonist in the episode "Abby & Veronica" where it is revealed she has an older cousin named Veronica who tried manipulating Otis and his friends to get what she wants. Her superhero alter-ego is "Cowgirl".

== Supporting characters ==
=== Snotty Boy ===
Eugene "Snotty Boy" Goldner (voiced by Steve Oedekerk) is a major antagonist in the franchise. He is Reginald and Serena Beady's son, Nora and Nathan Beady's nephew and Bernard Beady's younger cousin. Snotty Boy's uncle and aunt babysit him when his parents drop him off, much to Nathan's dismay. Snotty Boy is incredibly dimwitted, mean-spirited, selfish, spoiled, unpleasant, greedy, dishonest, bratty, and obnoxious. He enjoys torturing the animals, his best friends, and his uncle, which is the basis of the hatred by them. However, he only bullies his uncle when Mrs. Beady isn't around. He is also rude towards his parents and often mocks them as well and they don't even bother to disown him as they love him so much. He was bullied by his older cousin Bernard Beady when he was younger and he acts the way he does because of him.

=== Mr. Beady ===
Nathan Randall Beady III, more commonly known as Mr. Beady, (voiced by Steve Oedekerk), is Mrs. Beady's husband who miserably tries to convince his wife that animals do not talk. Mrs. Beady often calls him "Mr. Lump" because he always sits on a chair watching television and rejects his wife's suspicions. He is also shown to be miserable on a semi-constant basis, on some occasions wishing for death. He is mostly seen with a beverage in his hand which appears to be either soda or beer.

=== Sheep ===
The Sheep (voiced by Chris Hardwick, Leigh-Allyn Baker, Cam Clarke, Rob Paulsen and Jeff Bennett) always hang around together in an eternally close herd and are more intelligent than Duke. They often quote famous literature and make snide comments toward Duke. They seem to be very intelligent and philosophical despite their farmly upbringings.

=== Three Dogs ===
Three Dogs (voiced by Cam Clarke, Rob Paulsen and Fred Tatasciore) are a Golden Retriever, an American Pit Bull Terrier, and a Dobermann. The trio of dogs wear barbershop quartet skimmer hats, bowties, and sleeve garters.

=== Etta ===
Etta (voiced by Leigh-Allyn Baker in the series and Andie MacDowell in the film) is the lead hen and the mother of Maddy. She used to be a good friend of Ben.

=== Maddy ===
Maddy (voiced by Madeline Lovejoy) is a young chick who enjoys playing with Otis. She is slightly troublesome for her mother Etta to take care of because she often wanders off from her family. No mention of her is made in the series, although she can be seen in the theme song.

=== The Jersey Cows ===
The Jersey Cows are Eddy (voiced by S. Scott Bullock), Igg (voiced by Maurice LaMarche), and Bud (voiced by John DiMaggio), a trio of cows who first appears in the film. They enjoy pranking humans and dislike having rules. They're seen in the episodes "Cow's Night Out" and "Otis' Mom" and also have cameo appearances in several other episodes as well.

=== Everett ===
Everett (voiced by Lloyd Sherr) is the farmer's elderly bloodhound who first appears in the film, where he celebrates his 13th birthday, making him 91 in dog years. As the oldest animal on the farm, Everett is depicted as being droopy and is as thin as his own skeleton, which can easily be seen. Everett uses a walker to get around, except for when he is playing an instrument, and hardly ever talks, but in very few episodes, he speaks. In an episode, it is revealed that he was once an explorer, and he is a good fighter when he is protecting the corn from the crows.

=== Skunky ===
Skunky (voiced by Rob Paulsen) is Pig's pet skunk who is considered as the latter's best friend, much to Otis' chagrin, as seen in "Pig Amok". In "Doggleganger", it is revealed he hates Duke. He appears in "Snotty's New Pet", where Pig threw him through the window to skunk Snotty. He appears in later episodes.

=== Tony Twocheeks ===
Tony Twocheeks (voiced by Rob Paulsen) is a yellow-faced pocket gopher entrepreneur who lives near the farm. He often cons those who buy from him. He has an Elvis-like hairdo, sunglasses, and is sometimes seen chewing on a toothpick. He never appears in Season 2, presumably having been drowned by Chubs Malone as mentioned in Otis Eleven.

=== The Vet ===
"The Vet" (voiced by Audrey Wasilewski and Julia Sweeney) is a female veterinarian who is called in to give the animals checkups. Many of the animals fear her, due to the pain she inflicts whenever she performs a physical. However, unlike Snotty Boy, she is oblivious to the suffering her patients go through and actually loves animals. Animals (and sometimes people) fear her checkups. Farmer Buyer also seems to hold secret affections towards the Vet, as seen in "Dream Birthday".

=== Root ===
Root (voiced by Nathaniel Stroman) is a rooster and Peck's rival. He hosts the weekly talent show at the barn.

=== Baxter ===
Baxter (voiced by Kevin McDonald) is a Jack Russell Terrier who became Duke's nemesis after he met him at an animal clinic in the episode "Doggleganger". He disguises as Duke with the help of black spray paint to give him spots and markings like Duke's. Although Baxter seems to be a stray, he might have had an owner in order to be able to afford medical care. He makes three appearances, first in "Doggleganger" as Duke's replacement on the Barnyard, second in "Man's Best Fiend" for getting Duke kicked out of the farmer's house, and then in "Puppy Love" for trying to marry Duke's sister, Stamps, only for the fact she is second in line to a relative's priceless bone collection, is later tricked by Duke into getting the truth out.

=== Buck ===
Buck is a brown horse who lives on the farm who has a terrible temper and despises Otis. In the episode "Some Like It Snotty" where Otis dresses up as a girl to prove they have easier lives than boys and ends up becoming Snotty Boy's temporary girlfriend, Buck also dresses up as a girl.

=== Bigfoot ===
Bigfoot (voiced by Dee Bradley Baker), who debuted in "Otis vs. Bigfoot" is a mythological reported ape creature who is in love with Abby and wants to live at the Barnyard, but Otis wants him to go away. He is seen in several episodes since as a minor character, such as a judge in "Barnyard Idol", a mayoral candidate in "Otis for Mayor" and is also a singer. He also tricks the masses into thinking he is dead, but the animals later discover it is a publicity stunt to keep the paparazzi away from him. Apparently, Bigfoot can also fly and has his own theme song similar to Gamera. In multiple episodes, it is shown that he is afraid of flash photography.

=== Goat ===
Goat is a brownish-gray goat who is known for giving rides to Otis (i.e. The Great Sheep Escape, The Chronicles of Barnia). The goat has also played saxophone and even given advice to the others.

=== Pizza Twins ===
The Pizza Twins (voiced by Rob Paulsen and Steve Oedekerk) are identical twin pizza delivery boys who first appear in the original film and work for Siren Pizza and often deliver pizza to the farm. The duo is very unintelligent and whenever they manage to successfully perform a task (either good or bad) they chant their famous line, "Doodley-doodley doo doo."

=== Hilly Burford ===
Hilly Burford (voiced by John DiMaggio) is the series' news anchor who also is a judge in "Do You Gots It?", serves as Santa Claus in "It's an Udderful Life" and hosts the game show "Trivia Cash A-Ding-Dong" in the episode, "A Beautiful Freddy". His voice and characterization are a tribute to Will Ferrell's impression of longtime baseball announcer Harry Caray.

=== Officer O'Hanlon ===
Officer Frederick "Fred" O'Hanlon (voiced by John DiMaggio) is a local police officer who first appears in the film. In "Chain Gang" he serves as the prison warden because of budget cuts. He teams up with Mrs. Beady to capture Bigfoot in "Otis vs. Bigfoot".

=== Jessica Allspice ===
Jessica Allspice (voiced by Maria Bamford) is a celebrity pop diva and is featured as a judge on the show Do You Gots It? Her catchphrase is "I wanna party with you." She is a spoof of Jessica Simpson.

=== Joey, Macy and Boil ===
Three children on the farm that go to its school program, where Peck is the teacher. They are Joey the Calf (voiced by Rob Paulsen), Macy the Lamb (voiced by Maile Flanagan) and Boil the Chick (voiced by Chris Hardwick).

== Guest characters ==
=== Bingo ===
Bingo (voiced by Mark DeCarlo) is a chimpanzee test pilot who crashes into the farm with his spaceship, and he tries to get rid of Otis so he could be Barnyard leader. At the end, he is blasted to outer space on a spaceship, vowing to return (which he never does).

=== Mr. Jinks ===
A ventriloquist dummy made by Otis so Freddy could find a talent but then does mean things to the animals and lets Freddy take the blame. He is than defeated by Freddy and it is revealed that the dummy is controlled by termites who want revenge on the animals for destroying their tree home that was used to make it.

=== Juanita ===
Juanita (voiced by Grey DeLisle) is a female trapeze-artist.

=== Chubs Malone ===
Chubs Malone (voiced by Mark DeCarlo) is the head of the Gopher Underground shop. In Otis Eleven it is mentioned that he took Tony Twocheeks on a fishing trip, but Tony never came back, leading to speculation that he drowned Tony Twocheeks. He maliciously tries to take over the barn by cheating to win a game of Fizzbin and make the night barn the gophers' party place. But when Otis saves his life from a falling anvil, Chubs feels grateful and gives back the barn to the animals.

=== Krauser Krebs ===
Krauser Krebs (voiced by Thomas F. Wilson) is a mallard bully from Otis's childhood who is famous for making Otis squirt milk at himself. He only wants to apologize to Otis until Otis's friends get him mad and make Krebs attack them mercilessly. He leaves the barnyard to apologize to a warthog across town and in anger of Otis's friends attacking him.

=== Hanna ===
Hanna is a hen who's Peck's crush. Peck repeatedly tries to talk to her in an episode, but he always gets too shy when approaching her.

=== Wild Mike ===
Wild Mike (voiced by Rob Paulsen) is an animal of an undetermined kind, usually kept in a crate. He looks like a troll or a giant hairball with arms and legs. When released from the crate, he dances and causes all the animals around him to dance with him. He first appears in the Barnyard movie but is never introduced in the television series until the episode "Wild Mike's Dance Party".

=== Veronica ===
Veronica (voiced by Grey DeLisle) is a lovely femme fatale and Abby's cousin, who, according to Abby, is a tomboy during childhood but appears to have dropped any masculine personality traits but still seems to be as good a fighter as Abby had described her as before her visit. In this episode, Veronica entices all males on the barnyard into fetching a diamond for her from a nearby jewel mine, but Abby, knowing the many perils of that particular mine, beautifies herself in hopes of achieving more gorgeousness than Veronica, so she may convince all of the male animals (especially Otis) that her relative had deceived her into cancelling any plans of finding a diamond for Veronica.

=== Bill ===
Bill is a bull and Otis's rival. He appears in a few episodes, as a wrestler in one, and as a mad cow in another. In the film he is used for a throwaway gag of a bull riding a mechanical man.

=== Dr. Filly ===
Dr. Filly (parody of Dr. Phil) is a horse psychiatrist. In "Paging Dr. Filly", the animals hire him to cure Peck and Freddy's arguing, but he appears to make things worse. It is then revealed that this wasn't the real Dr. Filly and instead, it is a former patient of his, a donkey apparently named Chip, who likes to impersonate him.

=== Shmoozy ===
Shmoozy is a sperm whale. The animals liberate Shmoozy from a park, but they end up becoming swallowed by the whale. At the end of the episode the animals discover that Shmoozy is just playing around and has no intent of eating them. Shmoozy talks whale language, so only Freddy understands him.

=== Mr. Wiggleplix ===
Mr. Wiggleplix is an invisible hedgehog who appears in the episode of the same name. He is Pig's imaginary friend, but because Pig is the only one who can see him and he can only become visible when flour is poured on him, everybody else initially thinks he is not real. In the episode, Pig believes that Otis accidentally killed Mr. Wiggleplix, but in the end, he is revealed to be alive and well.

=== "Weird Al" Yankovic ===
"Weird Al" Yankovic (portrayed as a horse and voiced by himself) is Bessy's famous accordion-playing friend. Yankovic is seen in the episode, "Get Bessy".

=== French Canadian Crows ===
French Canadian Crows are a group of mischievous French-accented crows from Canada who enjoy stealing the farm's corn. They appear in "Cow's Night Out", "Treasure Hunt" as the main antagonists, and "A Catfish Called Eddie" as anti-heroes.

=== Stamps ===
Stamps (voiced by Nika Futterman) is Duke's sister who appears in "Puppy Love". She is seen dating Baxter, but it is revealed that Baxter did not love her, only her prized possessions.

=== Psycho ===
Psycho is a crazy Spanish Fighting Bull that appears in the episode "Rodeotis" and wears a silver ring in his nose.

=== Prunella ===
Prunella (voiced by Grey DeLisle) is a female Provence Donkey that appears in the episode "Hickory Dickory Donkey" and uses Pip as a fake boyfriend to make her real boyfriend, Thor jealous.

=== Plucky ===
Plucky is a Tyrannosaurus that stars in "Plucky and Me". His roar is equivalent to the T. rex roar from Jurassic Park.

=== Herb and Margaret ===
Herb (voiced by Tom Kane) and Margaret (voiced by Jennifer Hale) are Freddy's parents that appears in the episode "Meet the Ferrets". Freddy tries to hide his non-carnivore ways from his parents, and he doesn't want to eat anybody. Herb wears a black hat with a green and orange tie, a black nose, and long whiskers, and Margaret wears curly hair with earrings and glasses. Herb somehow calls Margret "mother" and in one point Freddy angrily destroyed the projector, and Freddy calls his parents "Mum and Dad" also it's revealed that Freddy's real name is "Fredrick".

=== Bernard Beady ===
Bernard Beady (voiced by Rob Paulsen) is one of Nora and Nathan Beady's nephews and Snotty Boy's older cousin who only appears in "Snotty and Snottier" as the main antagonist. Bernard comes to visit and tortures Snotty Boy which he always did since he and Snotty Boy were little. The animals at first enjoy this, seeing that Snotty Boy is finally getting just what he deserves, but they realize that Bernard is even worse than Snotty Boy when he starts beating up the animals and decide to help Snotty Boy get rid of his bully cousin. They have Snotty Boy lure Bernard into the barn so he can get beat up. Otis brings Mrs. Beady to the barn and rescues Snotty Boy from Bernard's wrath. Bernard is sent back to his parents and is forbidden to visit ever again.

=== Biggie Cheese ===
Biggie Cheese is a black rat rapper that appears for only a few minutes in the movie, he sings the song "Boombastic" by Shaggy.
