= Good Luck Charlie, It's Christmas! =

- Promotional poster
- Genre: Comedy; Family; Teen
- Based on: Good Luck Charlie by Phil Baker and Drew Vaupen
- Written by: Geoff Rodkey
- Directed by: Arlene Sanford
- Starring: Bridgit Mendler; Leigh-Allyn Baker; Bradley Steven Perry; Mia Talerico; Debra Monk; Michael Kagan; Eric Allan Kramer; Jason Dolley
- Music by: David Lawrence
- Country of origin: United States
- Original language: English

Production
- Executive producers: Dan Staley; Sheri Singer; Phil Baker; Drew Vaupen
- Producer: Matias Alvarez
- Cinematography: Kenneth Zunder
- Editor: Anita Brandt-Burgoyne
- Running time: 80 minutes
- Production companies: It's a Laugh Productions (uncredited); Salty Pictures

Original release
- Network: Disney Channel
- Release: December 2, 2011

Good Luck Charlie, It's Christmas! (also known as Good Luck Charlie: The Road Trip Movie in the United Kingdom and Ireland) is a 2011 American Christmas road comedy television film directed by Arlene Sanford and written by Geoff Rodkey, based on the Disney Channel television series Good Luck Charlie by Phil Baker and Drew Vaupen. Starring Bridgit Mendler, Leigh-Allyn Baker, Bradley Steven Perry, Mia Talerico, Eric Allan Kramer, and Jason Dolley as the Duncan family. The film takes place between the second and third seasons, which follows the Duncan family as they prepare for their Christmas trip to Amy Duncan's parents' house in Palm Springs, California. Things go awry however when Teddy and Amy find themselves separated from their family after Teddy gives up her seat in exchange for a free plane ticket. With only a few days left until Christmas, the duo will have to face numerous obstacles as they embark on a hitchhiking journey across Utah and Nevada to get to California so they can reunite with their family in time for the holidays.

The film was produced by It's a Laugh Productions (uncredited) and Salty Pictures and distributed by Disney-ABC Domestic Television. On December 2, 2011, the film premiered on Disney Channel, receiving a total of 6.9 million viewers upon its original airing.

== Plot ==
The Duncan family prepares to visit Amy's parents in Palm Springs for Christmas. Teddy asks Amy for permission to travel with her best friend Ivy to Florida for spring break, but she refuses to let Teddy travel alone. At the airport, Bob tells Teddy that if she can purchase her own plane ticket, she can go to Florida.

On the plane, a flight attendant announces that the flight has been overbooked and asks anyone to relinquish their seat in exchange for a free ticket. Seeing this as an opportunity to go to Florida, Teddy volunteers. Amy also departs the plane to follow her. They learn from a woman at the check-in desk that the next flight to Palm Springs is in three days, which is after Christmas. Amy gets into a violent confrontation with the woman and is escorted out by security, along with Teddy. Teddy suggests that they take the bus to Palm Springs.

When the rest of the family arrives in Palm Springs, tensions arise. Bob faces constant criticism from Amy's disapproving mother Petunia, Charlie breaks several items in the house, PJ gets a severe sunburn after accidentally using suntan oil instead of sunblock, and Gabe teaches Amy's father Hank how to play the video game Galaxy of Death, only for Hank to develop an addiction to it. While on the bus, Amy suffers from motion sickness and hogs the bathroom, resulting in her and Teddy getting kicked off the bus.

Stranded and desperate, Teddy and Amy rent a worn-out Yugo, which they end up destroying. While the car is taken to a scrapyard, Teddy suggests they hitchhike, much to Amy's chagrin. They meet an elderly couple and hitch a ride in their minivan, whereupon the woman correctly deduces that Amy is pregnant, much to Teddy's shock.

When they arrive in Las Vegas, Amy explains to a shocked Teddy that she and Bob planned on announcing her pregnancy to the whole family on Christmas. They then discover that their luggage has been stolen. After getting a call from Amy, Bob drives to Las Vegas along with PJ and Gabe to retrieve them. Teddy and Amy get into another argument, culminating in Amy angrily accusing Teddy of ruining Christmas, inadvertently causing Teddy to tearfully storm off. In order to earn money to afford dinner, the two do a street performance involving Christmas carols mixed with staged fights, and end up reconciling.

Over dinner, Amy admits that she didn't want Teddy to go to Florida because she fears Teddy is growing up too fast. Teddy apologizes for disembarking the plane, and Amy assures her Christmas isn't ruined. They later encounter Jordan, the girl who had stolen their luggage. Jordan tearfully explains that she has become stranded after running away from home to go to a cross-country music festival that her mother forbade her from attending. Sympathizing with Jordan, Amy calls Jordan's mother and helps them reconcile. Teddy gives Jordan her plane ticket to help her get back home for Christmas. Amy finally acknowledges that Teddy is responsible.

While driving through a desert, PJ, Gabe, and Bob are mistakenly kidnapped by a team of paintball participants. Understanding the situation, Gabe explains that Chuck Jablowsky, the creator of Galaxy of Death, holds a paintball tournament every Christmas Eve. After freeing themselves, Gabe convinces PJ and Bob to participate in the tournament. Using his knowledge of the game, Gabe wins the match and even meets Jablowsky himself. Jablowsky offers the trio a free helicopter ride to find Teddy and Amy, whom they locate at a diner they had biked to.

Hank and Petunia arrive with Charlie by car, having gone looking for the boys after they didn't return. With the entire family finally reunited, Petunia reveals that she found a star-shaped tree topper, which Amy lost earlier in the film, stuck between Charlie's car seat mechanism. Amy admits that this was the best Christmas she has ever had before announcing that she is having another baby, much to the excitement of her parents and the Duncans.

On the way home, the flight is once again overbooked and a free ticket is offered to whoever gives up their seat, which Teddy quickly accepts once more. Amy tells Bob to go after Teddy. He obediently does so, jokingly promising Amy that they will be back by New Year's Day. Amy smiles and says that she knows they won't.

== Cast ==
- Bridgit Mendler as Teddy Duncan
- Leigh-Allyn Baker as Amy Duncan
- Bradley Steven Perry as Gabe Duncan
- Mia Talerico as Charlie Duncan
- Debra Monk as Petunia
- Michael Kagan as Hank
- Eric Allan Kramer as Bob Duncan
- Jason Dolley as P.J. Duncan
- Raven Goodwin as Ivy
- Abbie Cobb as Jordan
- Pamela Dunlap as Sue
- David Wells as Stan
- Joey Nader as Daryl
- Bell as Lenny
- Ernie Grunwald as Walter

== Production ==
The film was executive-produced by Sheri Singer along with three executive producers of the series, Dan Staley, Phil Baker and Drew Vaupen. The script was written by Geoff Rodkey and directed by Arlene Sanford. The film was shot in Salt Lake City and St. George, Utah from March to September 2011. The Gateway complex in Salt Lake City was used to film scenes that were set on the Las Vegas Strip. Other filming locations included the Pirate Island pizza restaurant in Orem, which stood in as a Las Vegas buffet; and the Salt Palace convention center, which was transformed to look like the Denver Airport. Filming also took place at Skull Valley.

== Music ==
"I'm Gonna Run to You", performed by Bridgit Mendler, who also performed the Good Luck Charlie opening theme song, was released as promotional single on November 18, 2011. It was written by Bridget Mendler and Jamie Houston and produced by Houston. "Jingle Bells", "We Wish You a Merry Christmas" and "Deck the Halls" were also performed during the movie.

== Release ==
=== Broadcast ===
The film aired worldwide on Disney Channel. It premiered on December 2, 2011, in Canada, on December 16, 2011, in Australia, New Zealand, Ireland, and the United Kingdom. It aired in Singapore, Malaysia and the Philippines on December 24, 2011.

=== Home media ===
The movie was released on iTunes on December 6, 2011. An exclusive edition of the movie was released on DVD only through Walmart on October 23, 2012.

== Reception ==
=== Critical response ===
Emily Ashby of Common Sense Media gave the film 4 out of 5 rating, writing: "Good Luck Charlie fans have reason to celebrate this holiday special, which hones in on the most appealing aspects of the popular sitcom and glams them up for the festivities.

...There's no shortage of laughs in this merry movie that will appeal to parents almost as much as it does their kids."

=== Ratings ===
It was watched by 6.9 million viewers, the premiere also delivered 3.3 million kids 6–11, 2.4 million teens and 1.4 million adults 18–49. The movie became no. 1 live-action cable movie of 2011 in total viewers and the no. 1 live-action scripted telecast across all TV in kids 6–11. In Australia it was watched by 111,000 viewers and in the United Kingdom there were 562,000 viewers.

== See also ==
- Good Luck Charlie
- List of Christmas films
