= Michael Kagan =

American actor (born 1944)

- Born: April 28, 1944 (age 82)
- Occupations: Actor; writer; producer

Michael Kagan (born 1944) is an American actor.

== Career ==
He has guest starred in number of notable television series, including Lois & Clark: The New Adventures of Superman, Babylon 5, Step by Step, Seinfeld, ER, Tracey Takes On..., Star Trek: Voyager, The Practice, How I Met Your Mother, The King of Queens, The West Wing, Desperate Housewives and other series.

From 2006 to 2010, he had a recurring role as talk show host Colin Lassiter on the Disney Channel sitcom Hannah Montana. In 2011, he appeared in the Disney Channel film Good Luck Charlie, It's Christmas!. He has also done a number of stage productions, prior to appearing on film and television. In 2007, he performed in a play entitled Leap.

== Filmography ==
=== Film ===
Year	Title	Role	Notes
1997	Looking for Lola	Max Greenbaum	
1998	The Souler Opposite	Max Luckstein	
2000	The Chaos Factor	Air Traffic Commander	
2001	...or Forever Hold Your Peace	Nicos	
2001	Totally Blonde	Alfred / Mountie / Minister	
2002	Con Express	Commissioner Dunn	Direct-to-video
2005	Mobsters and Mormons	Angello Marcello	
2009	Ingenious	Mort	
2011	Searching for Sonny	Mr. Mercer	
2021	Eye of the Storm	—N/a	Documentary

=== Television ===
Year	Title	Role	Notes
1980	Lou Grant	Manny	Episode: "Pack"
1995	Charlie Grace	Earl 'Mad Dog' Jonas	Episode: "Take Me to the Pilot"
1995	The Home Court	Coach	Episode: "The Cheesehead Stands Alone"
1995	Lois & Clark: The New Adventures of Superman	President	Episode: "Chip Off the Old Clark"
1995	California Dreams	Mr. Hulka	Episode: "Community Service"
1996	Babylon 5	Emmett Farquaha	Episode: "A Late Delivery from Avalon"
1996	Hudson Street	Officer McAndrews	Episode: "Family Album"
1996	Champs	Process server	Episode: "Two of a Kind"
1996	The Cherokee Kid	El Paso Sheriff	Television film
1996, 1997	Suddenly Susan	Officer Kellogg	2 episodes
1996, 1999	Diagnosis: Murder	Dr. Alex Warner / Earl Slybotsky	2 episodes
1997	The Naked Truth	The Pound Attendant	Episode: "Itching for a Cat"
1997	Step by Step	Bride's Father	Episode: "Future Shock"
1997	Bella Mafia	Victor Muzetti	Television film
1998	Seinfeld	Willie	Episode: "The Dealership"
1998	Tracey Takes On...	Jewish Agent	Episode: "Agent"
1998	Jenny	Nicky	Episode: "A Girl's Gotta Make Room for Daddy: Part 2"
1998	ER	Chuck Arteburn	Episode: "Exodus"
1998	Caroline in the City	Pit Boss	Episode: "Caroline and the Visit from Mom"
1998	Mike Hammer, Private Eye	Sam Moeller	Episode: "Dump the Creep"
1998	Timecop	Svengali	Episode: "D.O.A."
1998	Beverly Hills, 90210	Lou Jessup	Episode: "Dealer's Choice"
1998, 2001	The Practice	Judge Keller / Peter Martini	2 episodes
1999	Walker, Texas Ranger	Phil Keswick	Episode: "In Harm's Way: Part 2"
1999	Snoops	Las Vegas Reverend Shapiro	Episode: "The Heartless Bitch"
1999	Ally McBeal	Robert Perry	Episode: "Buried Pleasures"
2000	Another Woman's Husband	Al	Television film
2000	Friends	Terry	Episode: "The One with Rachel's Assistant"
2000–2002	Providence	Dr. Sagerman / Liam	3 episodes
2001	Jack & Jill	Mr. Weyman	Episode: "Pressure Points"
2001	Star Trek: Voyager	Alien Commander	Episode: "Q2"
2001	The Korean War	Collins	Television film
2001, 2004	NYPD Blue	Judge Lasak / Lt. Jim Walters	2 episodes
2003	Dragnet	Myron Tarnower	Episode: "Well Endowed"
2003	Passions	Dr. Culver	Episode #1.1055
2004	Slogan	Richard	Television film
2004	The West Wing	FBI Director George Arnold	2 episodes
2004	Cold Case	Barney	Episode: "It's Raining Men"
2005	Grounded for Life	Investor	Episode: "Crazy"
2005	Alias	Leo Orissa	Episode: "Detente"
2005	Malcolm in the Middle	Cop	Episode: "Motivational Speaker"
2005	The Suite Life of Zack & Cody	Fan	Episode: "Big Hair & Baseball"
2005, 2008	How I Met Your Mother	Joel Adams	2 episodes
2006	Pepper Dennis	Kenny Aptow	Episode: "Charlie Babcock's Homosexual Encounter"
2007	The King of Queens	Lance	Episode: "Offensive Fowl"
2007–2010	Hannah Montana	Colin Lassiter	6 episodes
2009	Leverage	Allen Haldeman	Episode: "The Mile High Job"
2009	Citizen Jane	Judge Wilson	Television film
2010–2011	Desperate Housewives	Board Chairman	3 episodes
2011	Good Luck Charlie, It's Christmas!	Hank	Television film
2012	The Mentalist	Patrick Offit	Episode: "At First Blush"
2012	Days of Our Lives	Howard	4 episodes
2014	Dog with a Blog	Emerson	Episode: "The Mutt and the Mogul"
2016	Crazy Ex-Girlfriend	Moshe	Episode: "Paula Needs to Get Over Josh!"
