= Bradley Steven Perry =

American actor (born 1998)

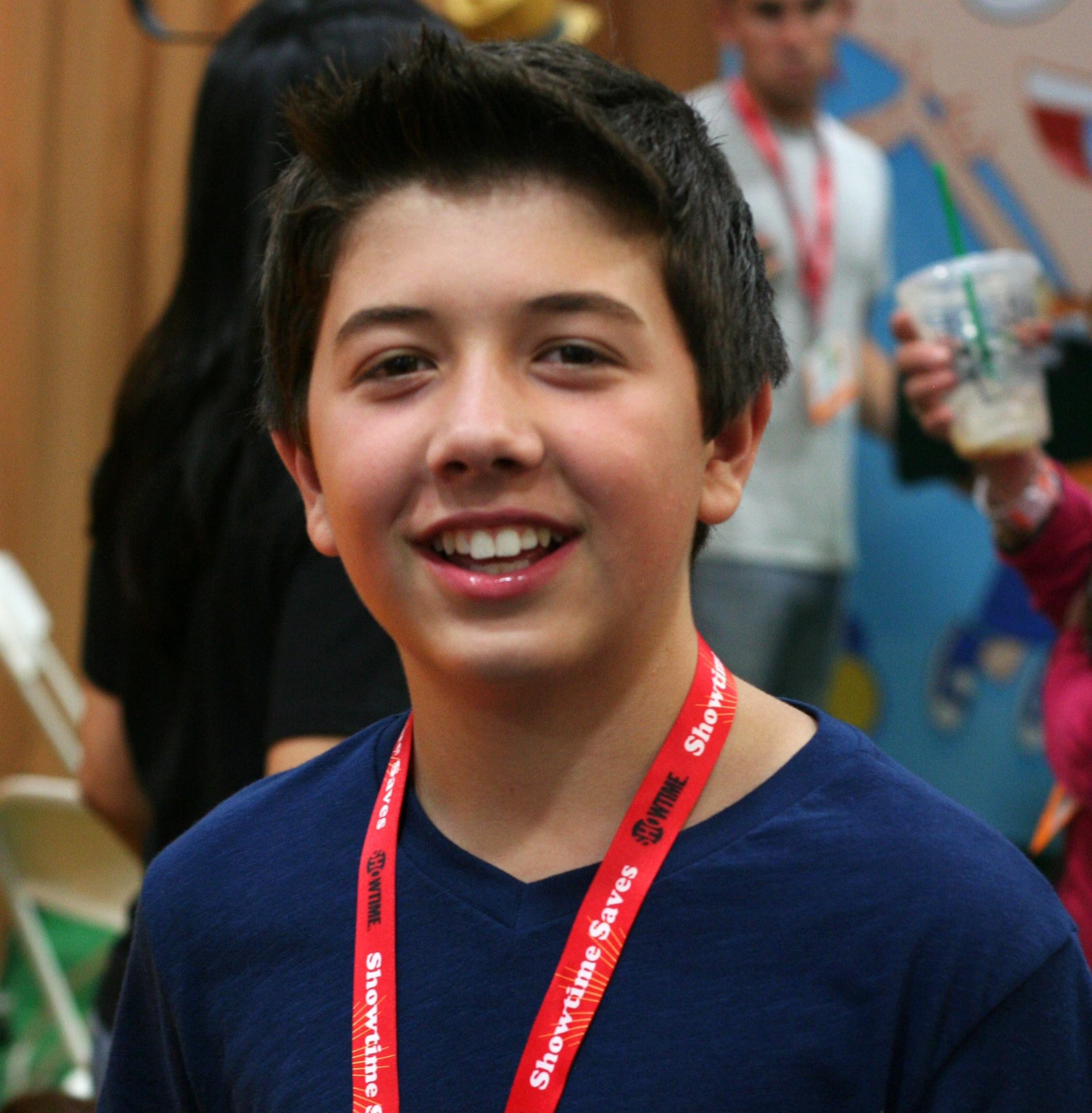
- Perry at the 2011 Comic-Con International
- Born: November 23, 1998 (age 27)
- Other name: Bradley Perry
- Education: University of Southern California
- Occupations: Actor; podcaster; YouTuber
- Years active: 2007–present
- Spouse: Natasha Bure (m. 2025)
- Children: 1
- Relatives: Candace Cameron Bure (mother-in-law); Valeri Bure (father-in-law)

Bradley Steven Perry (born November 23, 1998) is an American actor, podcaster, and YouTuber. He played the role of Gabe Duncan on the Disney Channel family sitcom Good Luck Charlie, and the role of Roger Ellison in Disney's High School Musical spin-off film Sharpay's Fabulous Adventure. Following this, Perry co-starred on the Disney XD comedies Mighty Med and its spinoff Lab Rats: Elite Force, where he played the role of Kaz. He is also known for his roles in the Disney XD Original Movie Pants on Fire (2014) and Hubie Halloween (2020).

== Early and personal life ==
Perry was born on November 23, 1998 and has three older sisters. He was homeschooled on the set of Good Luck Charlie and played on a local baseball team in his free time. Perry is also a fan of the Boston Red Sox and the New England Patriots and appeared in an NBC Sunday Night Football television promo as "The Patriots Kid".

In 2021, Perry graduated from the University of Southern California.

Perry was in a relationship with actress and singer Sabrina Carpenter from 2014 to 2015.

Since 2024, Perry has been in a relationship with Natasha Bure, the daughter of actress Candace Cameron Bure and Russian hockey player Valeri Bure. The pair privately got engaged in April 2025, and got married on September 14, 2025, in Malibu, California. On May 7, 2026, the couple announced they were expecting their first child together. On October 6, 2026, Natasha gave birth to a baby girl.

== Career ==
Perry began his professional acting career at the age of eight with small roles in the 2007 films Choose Connor, and Magnificent Max. The following year, he made his television debut with a guest-starring role on the CBS crime-drama Without a Trace. Over the next year, Perry continued to appear in small comedic roles in such films as The Goods: Live Hard, Sell Hard, Opposite Day, and Old Dogs.

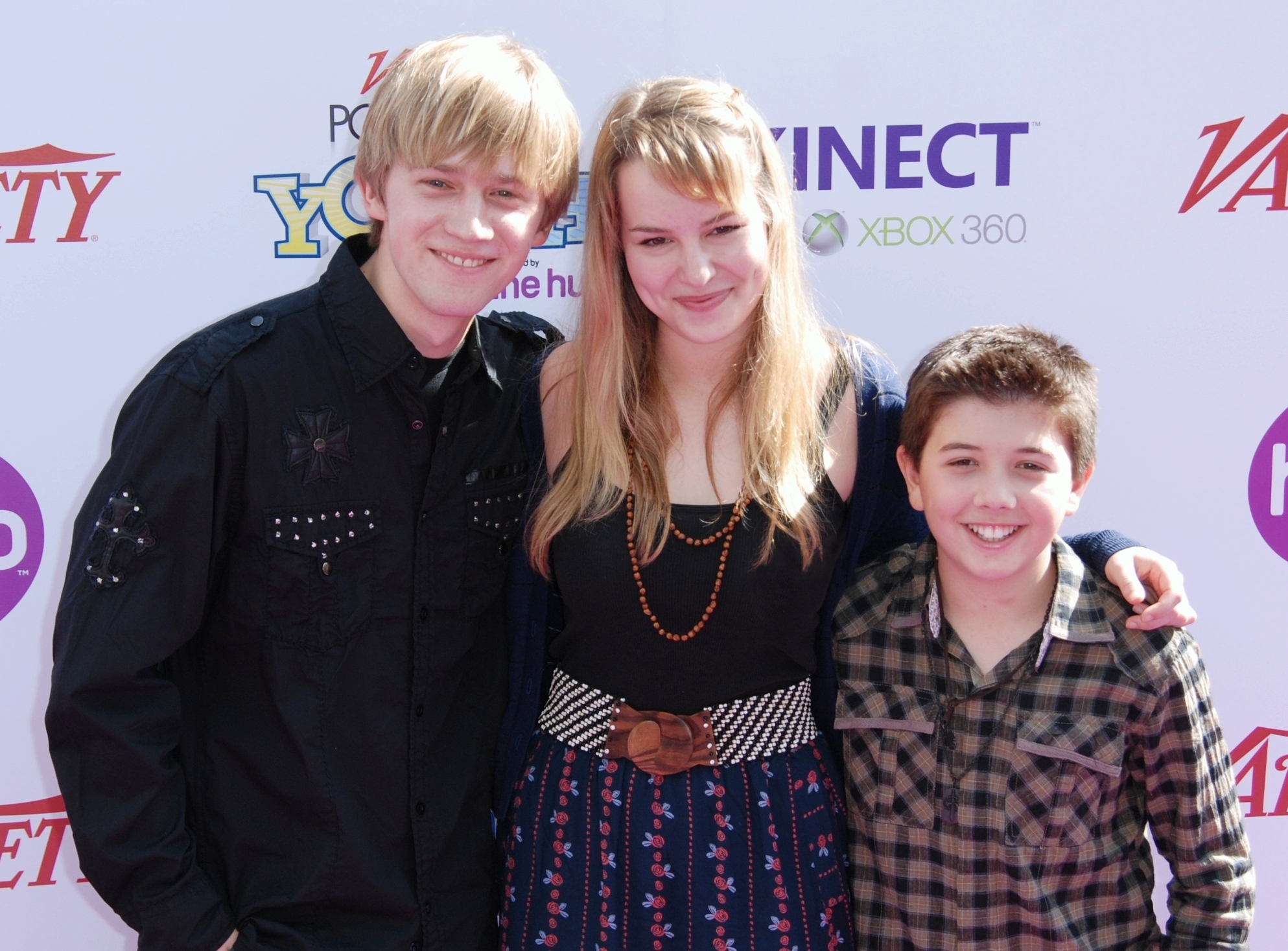
Perry (right) with fellow Good Luck Charlie cast members Jason Dolley and Bridgit Mendler in October 2010

In 2010, Perry starred on the Disney Channel family sitcom Good Luck Charlie. On the series, Perry played the mischievous and scheming Gabe Duncan, the third of five siblings in the Duncan family. In 2011, he starred in the show's Disney Channel Original film adaptation, Good Luck Charlie, It's Christmas!

In the same year, Perry co-starred in the Disney Channel Original movie Sharpay's Fabulous Adventure. In the film, Perry played Roger Ellison, a precocious young dog owner and Sharpay's rival, competing to get his dog a starring role on Broadway. In 2013, Perry began playing Kaz on the Disney XD show Mighty Med alongside Jake Short and Paris Berelc.

In 2014, Perry starred as Jack Parker in the Disney XD Original Movie Pants on Fire, which premiered on Disney XD on November 9, 2014. In 2015, Mighty Med ended its run, but Perry continued to play Kaz on the spinoff series Lab Rats: Elite Force, which premiered in March 2016. On Lab Rats: Elite Force, he made his directorial debut in the episode "Sheep-Shifting". In 2017, he appeared in Descendants: Wicked World as Zevon, the son of Yzma from The Emperor's New Groove.

On November 16, 2022, Perry started a podcast called Hit the Brake (now called The Sit and Chat) with Jake Short. On August 30, 2023, on YouTube, he began a cooking series Cooking with Bradley.

In 2025, Perry starred as Matty in Elle Mills's short film Don't Forget About Me.

== Filmography ==
=== Film ===
Year	Film	Role	Notes
2007	Choose Connor	School Boy	
2007	Magnificent Max	Georgie Rosenthal	Short film
2009	Old Dogs	Soccer Kid	
2009	Who Shot Mamba?	David	
2009	Opposite Day	Security Guard 39	
2009	The Goods: Live Hard, Sell Hard	Young Don Ready	
2010	Peacock	Young John Skillpa	Voice role
2020	Hubie Halloween	Cormac	
2025	Don't Forget About Me	Matty	Short film

=== Television ===
Year	Show	Role	Notes
2008	Without a Trace	Charlie	Episode: "Closure"
2010–2014	Good Luck Charlie	Gabe Duncan	Main role
2011	Sharpay's Fabulous Adventure	Roger Elliston	Television film
2011	Good Luck Charlie, It's Christmas!	Gabe Duncan	Television film
2013	Jessie	Gabe Duncan	Episode: "Good Luck Jessie: New York City Christmas"
2013–2015	Mighty Med	Kaz	Main role
2014	Win, Lose or Draw	Himself	3 episodes
2014	Pants on Fire	Jack Parker	Television film
2015	I Didn't Do It	Dr. Scott Gabriel	Episode: "The Doctor Is In"
2016	Lab Rats: Elite Force	Kaz	Main role
2016–2017	Descendants: Wicked World	Zevon	Voice role; Recurring role (season 2)
2017	Speechless	Donald	Episode: "H-e-r-Hero"
2019–2020	Schooled	Alec Raday	5 episodes
2020	S.W.A.T.	Harry Coogan	Episode: "Fracture"

== Awards and nominations ==
Award	Year	Category	Nominated work	Result
Young Artist Award	2011	Best Performance in a TV Series – Supporting Young Actor	Good Luck Charlie	Nominated
Young Artist Award	2012	Best Performance in a TV Series – Supporting Young Actor	Good Luck Charlie	Nominated
