= Pants on Fire (film) =

2014 film by Jonathan A. Rosenbaum

- Promotional poster
- Genre: Comedy
- Written by: Alex Cramer
- Directed by: Jonathan A. Rosenbaum
- Starring: Bradley Steven Perry; Joshua J. Ballard; Tyrel Jackson Williams; Brittney Wilson; Taylor Russell; Nicholas Coombe
- Music by: James Jandrisch

Production
- Producer: Kim Arnott
- Editor: Lisa Robinson
- Production companies: MarVista Entertainment; Two for the Money
- Budget: $2.5 million

Original release
- Network: Disney XD
- Release: November 9, 2014

Pants on Fire is a 2014 Disney XD Original Movie, starring Bradley Steven Perry, Joshua J. Ballard, Tyrel Jackson Williams and Brittney Wilson. It premiered on November 9, 2014.

== Plot ==
15-year-old Jack Parker is popular at school, has an easy home life, and gets a high chance of winning a scholarship that will lead him to be batboy for the Boston Red Sox. However, Jack is a chronic liar whose successes in life have been brought about through various lies he has told. While giving a speech one day, Mikey, a fake kid Jack claimed to be tutoring to get out of cleaning his room, suddenly appears, confusing him. Jack questions Mikey but gets no answers to where he came from as Mikey claims to be the kid from Jack's lies. As the day goes on, one by one every lie he has told start to come to life, starting with two angry lumberjacks and a possessive, jealous girlfriend, Lisa, from Arizona that sabotages his attempt to seduce Jennifer, a girl he has a crush on. Jack grows jealous of Mikey and Jennifer becoming close friends and humiliates himself in an attempt to separate them.

Jack and his friend Ryan try to figure out why his lies are coming true and track down that a purple hippo mascot from a children's restaurant/fun center has a connection to the occurrences. After chasing it down, the hippo explains that the only way to stop Jack's lies from coming true is to tell the truth. However, he refuses to do it, since the award ceremony is coming soon, and he does not want to lose. After, they soon come face-to-face with the lumberjacks again, along with another one of his lies: two alien agents. They are able to escape with the help of Lisa, but only after he tells her the truth. As Jack and Ryan go through the various lies the former has told, Jack realizes he had lied about being the adoptive son of two Asian parents to get out of school on a holiday and finds the lie to have come true with his real parents having been replaced.

After a conversation with a man practicing his baseball hits (who he later discovers was his baseball hero, Danny Kostas, getting over a slump), Jack comes clean at the award ceremony and is disqualified, losing the scholarship. Despite telling the truth, he and Ryan soon see all of his lies in the hall, not having gone away. They run into an empty room where they saw the hippo and Jack confronts it over why the lies have not gone away. The hippo reveals itself to be his sister, Hannah, who was fed up with his lies and wanted to teach him a lesson. She reveals that the lies were just actors and other people using special effects, and that they rehearsed the plot for months. They soon reconcile, but Jack's parents arrive and ground him by making him clean the whole garage. In the end, he finishes cleaning up the garage, finishes his punishment and learns his lesson about lying.

Jack visits Jennifer to apologize and promises he will never lie again for now. They soon take off in a limo to Fenway Park, with the compliments of Danny.

== Cast ==
- Bradley Steven Perry as Jack Parker
- Joshua J. Ballard as Ryan
- Tyrel Jackson Williams as Mikey
- Brittney Wilson as Hannah Parker / Hippo
- Taylor Russell as Jennifer
- Nicholas Coombe as Eric
- Rachelle Gillis as Lisa
- Kevin O'Grady as Chip
- John Stewart as Rock
- Jill Teed as Diane Parker
- Peter Graham-Gaudreau as Ed Parker
- Manoj Sood as Principal Kar
- Richard Ian Cox as Otis

== Production ==
By June 2014, Disney XD agreed to a multi-picture development deal with Two 4 the Money Media and MarVista Entertainment with MarVista having global distribution rights. The two companies teamed up for the first time for this TV film.

== Broadcast ==
The film premiered on Disney XD channels in the United States and Canada on November 9, 2014, and in Australia on February 6, 2015.
