= Phil Baker and Drew Vaupen =

American television writers and producers

Phil Baker and Drew Vaupen are an American television writing and producing team. They created the children's sitcom Good Luck Charlie for Disney Channel. Some of their other television credits include Pig Sty, Suddenly Susan, Almost Perfect, Common Law, Rodney, and Sonny with a Chance. The team has been honored with two Kids' BAFTA awards and three Emmy nominations for Outstanding Children's Series.

== Credits ==
- Pig Sty (1995, writers, 8 episodes)
- Almost Perfect (1995, creative consultant for 8 episodes, writers for 1 episode)
- Common Law (1996, writers, 1 episode)
- George and Leo (1997, writers, 1 episode)
- Suddenly Susan (1997–1999, producers and writers)
- Love & Money (1999, writers)
- The Weber Show (2000, writers)
- Men, Women & Dogs (2001, writers)
- Maybe It's Me (2001–2002, consulting producers, writers for 1 episode)
- What I Like About You (2002–2003, executive producers for 13 episodes, writers for 1 episode)
- Rodney (2004–2006, co-executive producers, supervising producers and writers)
- Sonny with a Chance (2009, supervising producers for 11 episodes, writers for 2 episodes)
- Good Luck Charlie (2010–2014, creators, executive producers and writers)
- Best of Luck Nikki (2011-2016, creators and writers)
- Good Luck Charlie, It's Christmas! (2011, executive producers)
