= The Last Frontier (1996 TV series) =

American television series

- Genre: Sitcom
- Created by: David Zuckerman
- Starring: Anthony Starke; Leigh-Allyn Baker; John Terlesky
- Composer: David M. Matthews
- Country of origin: United States
- Original language: English
- No. of seasons: 1
- No. of episodes: 6

Production
- Executive producer: Howard Myers
- Cinematography: Richard Brown
- Editor: George Escobar
- Running time: 30 minutes
- Production companies: HBO Independent Productions; 20th Century Fox Television

Original release
- Network: Fox
- Release: June 3 – July 8, 1996

The Last Frontier, is an American sitcom that aired on Fox in 1996. It featured a wealthy woman who moved to Anchorage, Alaska, sharing housing with three men who did not possess her social adeptness.

== Cast ==
- Anthony Starke as Billy McPherson
- John Terlesky as Reed Garfield
- Patrick Labyorteaux as Andy
- David Kriegel as Matt Garfield
- Leigh-Allyn Baker as Joy Garfield
- Jessica Tuck as Kate

== Episodes ==
No.	Title	Directed by	Written by	Original release date
1	"Pilot"	Arlene Sanford	David Zuckerman	June 3, 1996
2	"The One with the Friend's Theme"	Arlene Sanford	Bill Marich & Rich Ross	June 10, 1996
3	"Babes in Joyland"	Arlene Sanford	Michael Barker & Matthew Weitzman	June 17, 1996
4	"A Little Night Oosik"	J.D. Lobue	David Zuckerman	June 24, 1996
5	"Slack Like Me"	Richard Correll	Bill Marich & Rich Ross	July 1, 1996
6	"Single White Pest"	Arlene Sanford	Laurie Gelman	July 8, 1996
7	"When a Man Contaminates a Woman"	N/A	N/A	Unaired
8	"The Sun Barely Rises"	N/A	N/A	Unaired
