= Family Camp =

2022 film by Brian Cates

- Theatrical release poster
- Directed by: Brian Cates
- Written by: Brian Cates; Rene Gutteridge
- Produced by: Jay Howver; Darren Moorman; Trey Reynolds; Justin Tolley
- Starring: Eddie James; Tommy Woodard; Leigh-Allyn Baker; Gigi Orsillo
- Cinematography: James King
- Edited by: Chris Witt
- Music by: Nicholas Poss; Rhett Walker
- Production companies: K-LOVE Films; Provident Films; Reserve Entertainment; Skit Guys Studios
- Distributed by: Roadside Attractions
- Release date: May 13, 2022
- Running time: 111 minutes
- Country: United States
- Language: English
- Box office: $4 million

Family Camp is a 2022 American religious comedy film directed by Brian Cates and written by Cates and Rene Gutteridge. The film stars Tommy Woodard, Eddie James, Leigh-Allyn Baker, Elias Kemuel, and Gigi Orsillo, and follows two polar-opposite families who are forced to camp together, the fathers' struggles to hold onto their families and marriages as they compete for the coveted camp trophy. The film was released on May 13, 2022, in the United States, by Roadside Attractions. The film received mixed reviews and grossed $4 million at the box office.

== Plot ==
Businessman Tommy Ackerman's preoccupation with his job has interfered with his relationship with his wife, Grace, and their two children, Hannah and Henry. Grace insists the family attend Camp Katokwah, a church camp, located in the Ouachita National Forest. Upon arrival, the Ackermans discover Tommy failed to complete their reservation for a cabin and they are assigned to share a yurt with the Sanders family, whose vehicle had earlier passed them aggressively en route to the camp. Eddie Sanders is an insecure, self-absorbed chiropractor who, along with his wife, Victoria, and their two children Eddie Jr. and Barb, present themselves as the perfect family. Tensions quickly rise, especially between Tommy and Eddie. The two families compete for the Camp Katokwah trophy, won by the Sanders the past two years. Meanwhile, Tommy and Grace continue to navigate through their difficulties caused by Tommy's job commitments. Their teenaged daughter, Hannah, begins seeing a boy, which concerns Grace. Henry, who randomly takes videos, records an argument between Eddie and Victoria, which Tommy later views inadvertently.

Tommy and Eddie join several other men from the camp on a hike to deepen their faith. The pair becomes separated from the group and eventually lost after Eddie's attempt to take a honeycomb results in a swarm of bees attacking both men. Searchers are unable to locate them and Henry also becomes lost when he leaves camp to find his father. The differences between Tommy and Eddie come to a head; however, they are forced to unite against a pair of failed reality television show hunters who tie them up, believing they are thieves. Henry is located to Grace's delight. Tommy and Eddie finally escape and find the trail back to camp. Tommy discovers Eddie had a compass and map and is furious when Eddie admits he got them lost intentionally in order for Victoria to appreciate him upon his return. The men return to camp, but are estranged.

During the ceremony which awards the Sanders with the camp trophy for another year, Eddie confesses his shortcomings in his marriage, and also apologizes to Tommy, giving him the trophy instead. Tommy forgives Eddie and renews his commitment to Grace that he will be a better husband.

In a post-credits scene, Slim tricks Beef out of their last hot dog.

== Cast ==
- Tommy Woodard as Tommy Ackerman
- Eddie James as Eddie Sanders Sr.
- Leigh-Allyn Baker as Grace Ackerman, Tommy's wife
- Gigi Orsillo as Victoria Sanders, Eddie's wife
- Robert Amaya as Joel
- Cece Kelly as Hannah Ackerman, Tommy & Grace's daughter
- Jacob Michael Wade as Henry Ackerman, Tommy & Grace's son
- Elias Kemuel as Eddie Sanders Jr., Eddie & Victoria's son
- Keslee Blalock as Barb Sanders, Eddie & Victoria's daughter
- Heather Land as "Cookie"
- Mark Christopher Lawrence as Pastor Dave
- Myke Holmes as "Slim"
- Weston Vrooman as "Beef"
- Brandon Potter as Bramberger

== Production ==
Filming began at Edmond, Oklahoma in June 2020.

== Release ==
The film was released in theaters on May 13, 2022, by Roadside Attractions.

== Reception ==
In the United States and Canada, the film earned $1.4 million from 854 theaters in its opening weekend, finishing ninth at the box office. It dropped out of the box office top ten in its second weekend with $887,555.

On the review aggregator website Rotten Tomatoes, 40% of 5 reviews are positive. Nicolas Rapold of The New York Times criticized the movie, calling it a "vanishingly mild comedy that resembles other films about parents and kids bumbling in the wilderness." Tara McNamara, writing for Common Sense Media, was more positive and said, "The Skit Guys have answered faith-based movie lovers' prayers: This is easily the best Christian comedy made to date. With excellent production values, solid direction, and fantastic comedy chops from the cast, Family Camp is a winner."

At their 2023 Award ceremony, MovieGuide awarded it the prize for Most Inspirational Independent Movie.
