= American Summer =

American family comedy film

- Directed by: Michael W. Gray
- Screenplay by: Michael W. Gray; Jennifer B. White
- Produced by: Michael W. Gray; Michael Cuomo
- Starring: Steve Guttenberg; Christie Brinkley
- Production companies: Relentless Filmz; Brooklyn Owl Pictures
- Distributed by: Blue Harbor Entertainment
- Release date: September 4, 2026
- Country: United States
- Language: English

American Summer is a 2026 American family comedy film directed by Michael W. Gray and starring Steve Guttenberg and Christie Brinkley.

== Cast ==
- Steve Guttenberg as Mikey
  - Logan Gray as Young Mikey
- Christie Brinkley as Kelly
  - Mia Talerico as Young Kelly
- Dan Lauria as Grandpa
- Cullen Moss as Eddie
- Erinn Ruth as Erica
- Michael Cuomo as Mr. Young
- Ellen Toland as Skylar
- Stephen Krahel as Dad
- Callie Reese as Stephanie
- Charlotte Pearson as Kelly and Stephanie’s Friend
- Cash Chisum as Puff
- Jaba Keh as Smacks
- Carter J Thomas
- Max Malas as Leadhead
- Maximus Virgili as Buck Mulvaney
- Chance Stout as Jake Darcy
- Lee Mazzilli as Coach Valentine
- Luis Sojo as Luis

== Production ==
The film is written by Michael W. Gray and Jennifer B. White, with Gray directing. It is a co-production of Relentless Filmz and Brooklyn Owl Pictures. Gray is also a producer alongside Michael Cuomo. Executive producers are Brian Dubin and Stephen Krahel as well as Steve Guttenberg and Christie Brinkley, who also star. The cast also includes Logan Gray, Mia Talerico, Dan Lauria, Cullen Moss, and former baseball players Lee Mazzilli and Luis Sojo. Principal photography took place in New Jersey in October 2024.

Principal photography took place in Bergen County, New Jersey in October 2024, with filming locations including Westwood, Ho-Ho-Kus and Allendale.

== Release ==
The film was premiered on September 4, 2026.
