= Leigh-Allyn Baker =

American actress (born 1972)

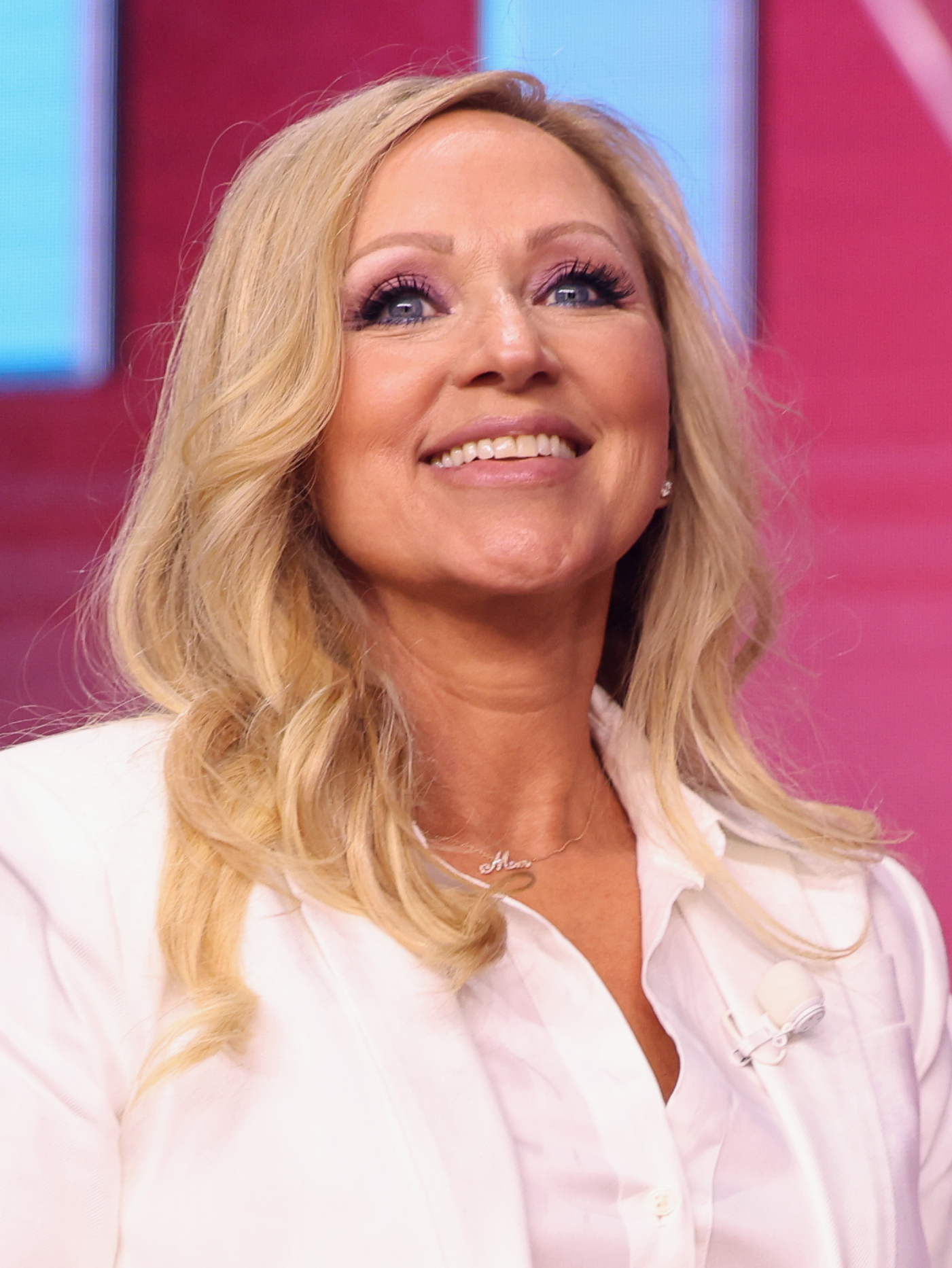
- Baker in 2025
- Born: March 13, 1972 (age 54); Murray, Kentucky, U.S.
- Occupation: Actress
- Years active: 1994–present
- Agent: CESD Talent (voice-over)
- Political party: Republican
- Spouse: Keith Kauffman (m. 2004)
- Children: 2

Leigh-Allyn Baker (born March 13, 1972) is an American actress. She had recurring roles on Charmed and as Ellen on Will & Grace, and a starring role as mother Amy Duncan on the Disney Channel sitcom Good Luck Charlie. She also provided the voice of Abby on the animated Nickelodeon series Back at the Barnyard. Baker has also extended her career by becoming a political activist and commentator.

== Career ==
Baker has done voice work in video games for the Star Trek and X-Men franchises and guest starred in television shows such as That '70s Show, Early Edition, and Yes, Dear, among other series. She also starred in the short-lived 1996 sitcom The Last Frontier and voiced Lu Zhi in the 2010 game Age of Conan: Rise of the Godslayer.

Baker is also known to television audiences for her recurring roles as Hannah Webster in the first season of Charmed and as Ellen, the long-time friend of Grace Adler (Debra Messing) on Will & Grace, a role she played from the show's first season in 1998 through its last in 2006 (and again in 2018, in the show's revival). She is also known for providing the voice of Abby in the Nickelodeon animated series Back at the Barnyard.

In late 2008, Baker appeared on several episodes of Hannah Montana playing Mickey, a morning show host. She starred as Amy Duncan, the matriarch of the Duncan family on the Disney Channel original sitcom Good Luck Charlie, which ran from 2010 to 2014.

Baker has also made an appearance, along with her co-star Mia Talerico, on the sketch comedy show, So Random!

In 2015, she starred in the Disney Channel Original Movie, Bad Hair Day, which she also produced. She plays Liz Morgan, a "down on her luck" cop who must get a priceless necklace by teaming up with high school senior, played by Laura Marano. In an interview with Variety, Baker said, "I wanted to executive produce because I wanted to see what it was like to build and fulfill a vision from the ground up, and since this was Disney Channel's first movie with an adult lead, I wanted that role to be protected and I wanted the movie to have my creative stamp on it." She also liked that she got to work on the Disney movie because it taps into her family unit fanbase. In 2016, she starred in the faith-based Christmas film, Wish for Christmas.

== Personal life ==
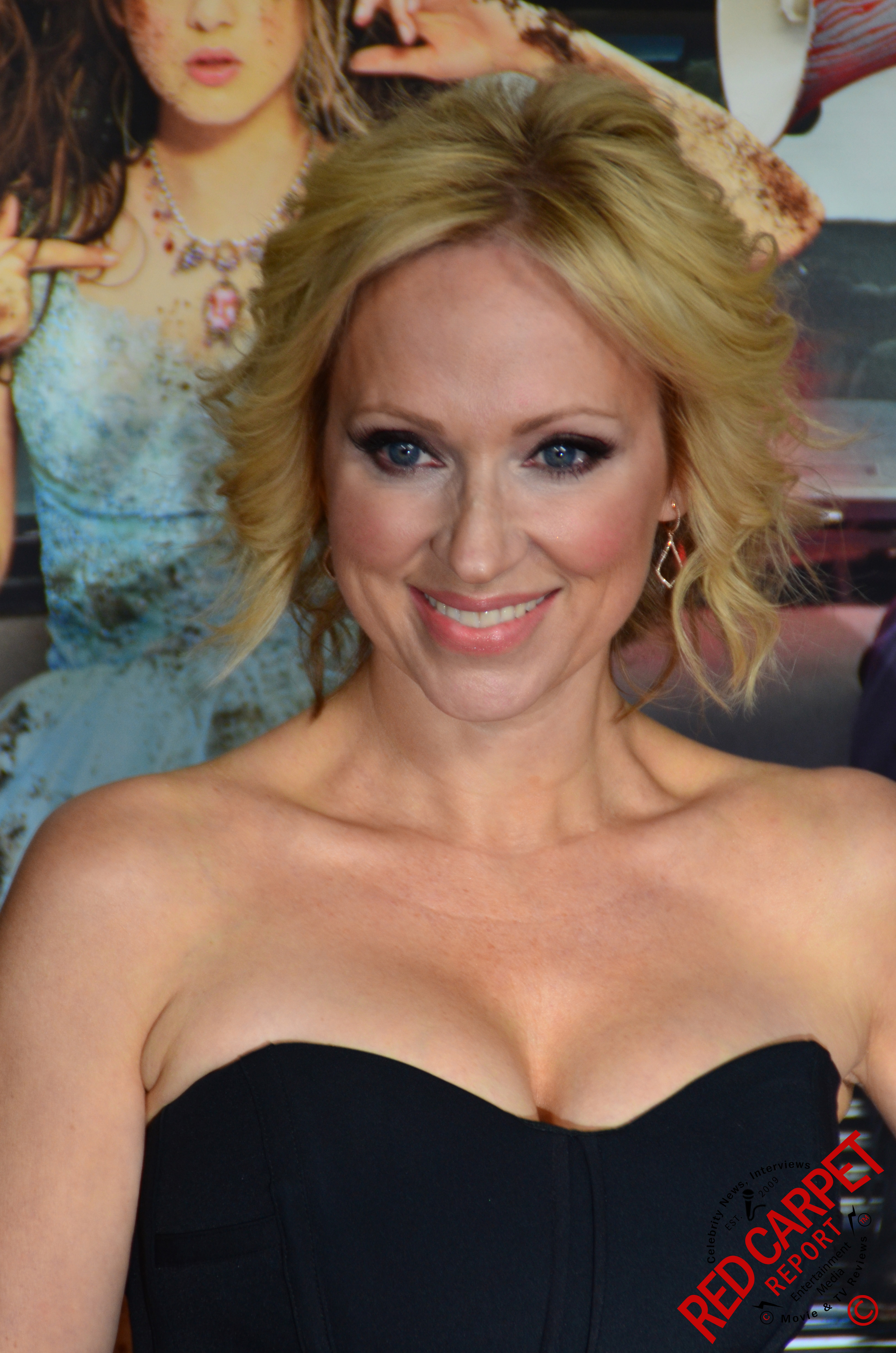
Baker in 2015

Baker married entertainment executive Keith James Kauffman in 2004. They have two sons. The elder son has been diagnosed with dyspraxia.

On August 12, 2021, Baker spoke in opposition to a decision by the Williamson County Board of Education in Williamson County, Tennessee for a temporary one-month county-wide mask mandate for elementary school students amidst the COVID-19 pandemic. Baker is against abortion and has spoken in support of the late Charlie Kirk.

== Filmography ==
=== Live-action filmography ===
==== Television ====
List of live-action acting appearances in television series
Year	Title	Role	Notes	Ref
1996	Almost Perfect	Gina	Episode: "A Midseason Night's *** Comedy"	
1996	The Last Frontier	Joy Garfield	2 episodes	
1997	Fired Up	Janet	Episode: "Truth and Consequences"	
1998–2006, 2018	Will & Grace	Ellen	Recurring role (seasons 1–5, 7–8)	
1998–1999	Charmed	Hannah Webster	Recurring role	
1999	Family Law	Laurie Carrigalo	Episode: "Damages"	
2000	Early Edition	Kate O'Rourke	Episode: "Luck o' the Irish"	
2001	The Geena Davis Show	Miss Susie	Episode: "Car Wash"	
2002	Yes, Dear	Stacey	Episode: "Johnny Ampleseed"	
2003	That '70s Show	Officer Debbie	Episode: "Hey Hey What Can I Do?"	
2005	Las Vegas	Charlene	Episode: "When You Got To Go, You Go To Go"	
2005	Boston Legal	Frannie Huber	Episode: "Tortured Souls"	
2006	House	Claire	Episode: "Euphoria: Part 2"	
2006	The King of Queens	Jessica	Episode: "Affair Trade"	
2007	In Case of Emergency	Maureen	5 episodes	
2007	My Name is Earl	Nicole Moses	Episode: "Harassed a Reporter"	
2008–2009	Hannah Montana	Mickey	2 episodes	
2008	12 Miles of Bad Road	Marilyn Hartsong	Main role	
2010–2014	Good Luck Charlie	Amy Duncan	Main role Directed 2 episodes	
2011	So Random!	Herself	Episode: "Leigh Allyn Baker and Mia Talerico"	
2014	Dog with a Blog	Cheri	Episode: "Who's Training Who?"	
2016	Roommates	Mrs. Campbell	Episode: "Five Guys and Thanksgiving"	
2017	Battle of the Network Stars	Herself	Episode: "Cops vs. TV Sictoms"	
2017	Real Rob	Mrs. Betty	2 episodes	
2019	Malibu Rescue	Dylan's Mom	Episode: "Stranger Flings"	
2025	A Week Away: The Series	Karla	Main role	

==== Feature films and television films ====
List of appearances and roles in feature films
Year	Title	Role	Notes	Ref
1994	Shrunken Heads	Mitzi		
1995	Leprechaun 3	Waitress		
1997	Inner Shadow	Gaika		
1997	Swing Blade	Lauranne		
1997	Breast Men	Implant Removal Patient		
1999	A Wake in Providence	Connie		
2000	Very Mean Men	Mary		
2004	The Crux	Woman Hanging from the Rope	Short film	
2011	Good Luck Charlie, It's Christmas!	Amy Duncan	Disney Channel Original Movie	
2015	Bad Hair Day	Liz Morgan	Disney Channel Original Movie; executive producer	
2016	Little Savages	Jackie		
2016	Wish for Christmas	Elizabeth MecLaren		
2017	Camp Cool Kids	Taryn	Direct-to-video	
2017	Swiped	Leah Singer		
2018	Running from My Roots	Vanessa Reynolds	Also known as Take 2 for Faith	
2019	Misfits	Roxy Gaines		
2022	Family Camp	Grace Ackerman		

=== Voice-over filmography ===
==== Television ====
List of voice performances in television series and specials
Year	Title	Role	Notes	Ref
1996–1997	Spider-Man: The Animated Series	Alisa Silvermane / Alisa Silver	4 episodes	
1996	The Incredible Hulk	Taylor, Maureen	Episode: "Man to Man, Beast to Beast	
2006	American Dad!	Margie	Episode: "It's Good to Be the Queen"	
2007–2011	Back at the Barnyard	Abby, Etta, various voices	52 episodes	
2011	The Penguins of Madagascar	Bella Bon Bueno, Woman	Episode: "Whispers and Coups/Brush with Danger"	
2013–2016	Jake and the Never Land Pirates	Queen Coralie, Mermaid #1, Mermaid #2	9 episodes	
2014–2016	The 7D	Queen Delightful, Snazzy Shazam	44 episodes	
2017–2021	Mickey Mouse Mixed-Up Adventures	Fiona Featherstone, Portia DeHound, Mrs. McBilly, Heidi, Coach Hannah, Lisa Longtree, Dandelion Doozy, Nina Doozy,	12 episodes	
2017–2019	Star vs. the Forces of Evil	Mail Monster, Additional voices/Unicorn	5 episodes	

==== Video games ====
List of voice performances in video games
Year	Title	Role	Ref	Notes
2000	Star Trek: Voyager – Elite Force	Crewman Juliet Jurot		
2002	Command & Conquer: Renegade	Dr. Sydney Mobius		
2003	Star Trek: Elite Force II	Ensign Juliet Jurot		
2004	X-Men Legends	Jean Grey		
2004	EverQuest II	Merchant and others		
2005	X-Men Legends II: Rise of Apocalypse	Jean Grey		
2005	Law & Order: Criminal Intent	Laura Douglas, Caroline Higgins, Hanna Pritchard, Suzanne Stokes, Andrea Warren		
2006	Curious George	Narrator		
2006	Agatha Christie: Murder on the Orient Express	Countess Andrenyi, Mary Debenham		
2007	God of War II	Lahkesis, Bathhouse Girl 2		Credited as Leigh Allyn Baker
2007	Mass Effect	Major Elena Flores, Rebekah Petrovsky		
2008	The Hardy Boys: The Hidden Theft	Laura Hardy		Credited as Leigh Allyn Baker
2008	Gears of War 2	KR Pilot #2, COG Medic #1, Centaur Driver #1		
2009	G.I. Joe: The Rise of the Cobra	Scarlett		
2009	Halo Wars	Spartan Alice-130, Adam's mom, additional voices		
2011	Star Wars: The Old Republic	Various voices		
2012	The Secret World	Madame Rogêt, additional voices		
2013	Lightning Returns: Final Fantasy XIII	Additional voices		Credited as Leigh Allyn Baker
2021	Mass Effect: Legendary Edition	Major Elena Flores, Rebekah Petrovsky		Credited as Leigh Allyn Baker
