= Heather Land =

American comedian

Heather Land is an American comedian. She also releases music, including gospel music.

== Early life ==
Heather Land is from Milan, Tennessee; she graduated from high school in 1994.

== Comedy career ==
Land creates comic videos that she shares on Facebook, addressing topics from her daily life such as Sunday school or gym etiquette. She began posting short videos in 2017 on the advice of her friends. One video where she mocked CrossFit became popular, gaining twenty million views. By the end of 2018, she was performing stand-up comedy shows on tour. Land's book I Ain't Doing It is expected 7 May 2019.

== Filmography ==
Year	Title	Role	Notes
2022	Family Camp	Cookie	

== Music career ==
Land grew up as a worship leader and creates music. In 2011, she released a gospel album Pouring It Out For You. She more recently released an album entitled Counting On.

== Personal life ==
Land met her ex-husband at a Bible college in Pensacola, Florida. They were married for nearly 15 years and had two children. From Florida, the Lands moved to West Texas where they lived for ten years. Next, they lived in Colorado Springs. While in Colorado Springs, Land began homeschooling her two children.
