= Anthony Starke =

American actor (active 1985– )

- Occupation: Actor
- Years active: 1985–present

Anthony Starke is an American actor. He is known for his one-episode role in Seinfeld, playing the third-person-speaking character Jimmy in the 1995 episode "The Jimmy", as well as his main cast role as Jack on The George Carlin Show (1994–1995).

== Biography ==
Starke's first screen role was playing quadriplegic teenager Dean Conroy in the CBS Tuesday Night Movies presentation, First Steps (1985). His first feature film was Nothing in Common (1986).

In 1987, Starke played frat president and resident bully Russ in the movie 18 Again!. Starke played Truman-Lodge in the James Bond film Licence to Kill in 1989, Chad Finletter in Return of the Killer Tomatoes in 1988, and a U.S. Embassy consultant in the 2007 NCIS episode "Designated Target". Starke also co-starred as the smooth-talking gambler Ezra Standish in The Magnificent Seven between 1998 and 1999.

In 2002, he played the role of a warlock, Devlin, in a fourth-season episode of Charmed.

In 2009, Starke had a recurring role on the ABC Family television series Make It or Break It as Steve Tanner, the rich father of one of the gymnasts from the training center 'The Rock', Lauren Tanner. He also played the role of Dr. Bob Taylor on Baby on Board. He was also in four episodes of the Disney Channel series Shake It Up, as the boyfriend of Cece's mother.

== Filmography ==
=== Film ===
Year	Title	Role
1986	Nothing in Common	Cameron
1988	18 Again!	Russ
1988	Return of the Killer Tomatoes	Chad Finletter
1989	Licence to Kill	Truman-Lodge
1990	Repossessed	Father Luke Brophy
1993	Nowhere to Run	Billy
1996	The Cherry Pick	Bedrijfsleider vliegveld
2009	Baby on Board	Dr. Taylor
2013	How Sweet It Is	Barry
2015	Meet My Valentine	Dr. Weaver
2015	A Christmas Eve Miracle	Dustin Holden
2020	The Scorpion's Tale	The Warden

=== Television ===
Year	Title	Role	Notes
1985	First Steps	Dean Conroy	TV movie
1986–1987	One Big Family	Don Hattan	Main cast
1990	The Flash	The Ghost	Episode: "Ghost in the Machine"
1991	Beverly Hills, 90210	Cowboy	Episode: "Halloween"
1991	Roseanne	Percy	Episode: "Stressed to Kill"
1992	Cheers	Slim	Episode: "Take Me out of the Ball Game"
1992	Down the Shore	Vaughn	Episode: "A Tale of Two Houses"
1994–1995	The George Carlin Show	Jack Donahue	Main cast
1995	Seinfeld	Jimmy	Episode: "The Jimmy"
1996	The Last Frontier	Billy McPherson	Recurring role
1998–1999	The Magnificent Seven	Ezra Standish	Main cast
1999	Cold Feet	David Chandler	Recurring role
2001	Charmed	Devlin	Episode: "Muse to My Ears"
2002	Angel	Tyke	Episode: "A New World"
2003	Abby	Sean Parks	Episode: "Leggo My Ego"
2004	Crossing Jordan	Brad Halford	Episode: "Dead or Alive"
2005	Prison Break	Sebastian Balfour	3 episodes
2006	Nip/Tuck	Tom McNamara	Episode: "Conor McNamara"
2007	Cold Case	Jay Dratton	Episode: "The Good Death"
2007	Burn Notice	Doug Baker	Episode: "False Flag"
2007	NCIS	Derrick Choyce	Episode: "Designated Target"
2007	Journeyman	Young Dennis Ambacher	Episode: "Home by Another Way"
2008	ER	Dr. Craig	2 episodes
2008	House	Roger	Episode: "It's a Wonderful Lie"
2008	Moonlight	Ken Verdolino	Episode: "What's Left Behind"
2009	CSI: Crime Scene Investigation	Richard Palento	Episode: "The Grave Shift"
2009–2012	Make It or Break It	Steve Tanner	Main cast (seasons 1–2), recurring role (season 3)
2009	Lie to Me	Kyle Harmon	Episode: "The Core of It"
2011	The Defenders	Blake	Episode: "Morelli v. Kaczmarek"
2011	CSI: Miami	Peter Holland	Episode: "Special Delivery"
2011	Suits	Colin Church	Episode: "Dirty Little Secrets"
2012	Shake It Up	Jeremy Hunter	5 episodes
2012	Castle	Gary Moore	Episode: "Death Gone Crazy"
2014	Perception	Richard Douglas	Episode: "Possession"
2014–2017	Hand of God	Gilbert McCauley	Recurring role
2015	Mad Men	Gerald Brady	Episode: "Time & Life"
2017–2018	MacGyver	Henry Fletcher	2 episodes
2021	9-1-1: Lone Star	Alan	Episode: "Difficult Conversations"
2022	The Walls Are Watching	Detective Ivie	TV movie
2024	9-1-1	Brunson	Episode: "You Don't Know Me"
