= Baby on Board (film) =

- Promotional poster
- Directed by: Brian Herzlinger
- Written by: Michael Hamilton-Wright; Russell Scalise
- Produced by: Emilio Ferrari; Russell Scalise
- Starring: Heather Graham; Jerry O'Connell; John Corbett; Lara Flynn Boyle
- Cinematography: Denis Maloney
- Edited by: Ross Albert
- Music by: Teddy Castellucci
- Production company: Screen Media
- Distributed by: Lucky Monkey Pictures; National Entertainment Media
- Release date: June 9, 2009
- Running time: 95 minutes
- Country: United States
- Language: English
- Budget: $8 million

Baby on Board is a 2009 comedy film starring Heather Graham, John Corbett, Jerry O'Connell, Anthony Starke and Lara Flynn Boyle.

Young and ambitious power couple, Angela and Curtis Marks, find themselves expecting earlier than planned. She hides the pregnancy to not jeopardize a promotion and they both erroneously believe the other is cheating, leading to an awkward nine months.

The film was released on April 16, 2010 and received overwhelmingly negative reviews.

== Plot ==
Ambitious businesswoman Angela Marks works for a cosmetics company while her husband Curtis Marks is a cut-throat divorce attorney. The recently married couple's close friends Sylvia and Danny Chambers have two kids and a strained marriage. Angela observes Sylvia's stress and struggle with their kids, while Curtis regularly sees his law partner Danny's wandering eye.

Hoping to head a major ad campaign for a new perfume for expectant mothers, Angela blows her first attempted pitch to her over-demanding boss Mary. Sudden uncontrollable flatulence drives everyone out of the conference room. Even so, Angela gets OKed to prepare a breakdown to launch the fragrance, which could land her a vice-presidency.

The two couples meet for dinner. The Marks' try to share their professional good fortune, Angela with the perfume account, Curtis with a potential lucrative, high-profile divorce case. However, friction between the Chambers cuts the outing short.

That evening, Sylvia catches Danny masturbating. When he insists it is his right, as it is his house, she angrily kicks him out. Meanwhile, at the Marks', Angela wakes after dreaming about Curtis cheating on her, but he insists it was not real.

The next day, an upset Sylvia meets with Angela. She explains she kicked out Danny for his apparent cheating. When Angela vomits again, she is convinced to visit her friend and doctor. Dr. Taylor, after hearing her symptoms, does an ultrasound to confirm his suspicions...she is pregnant.

The unexpected, inconvenient pregnancy puts Angela in shock, as they had been using double condoms for safety. Walking home in a daze, protesting to those along the street 'I'M NOT PREGNANT', she passes a restaurant just as a woman straddles Curtis. Angela's despondency blinds her so she does not see him trying to push the woman off his lap as he was uncomfortable. The woman is Mrs. Jenkins, his over-sexed client.

When Curtis gets home, a very depressed and fuming Angela confronts him. When he asks her what is wrong, she curtly says, YOU KNOW WHAT YOU DID. As Curtis has no idea Angela saw the restaurant incident, he is very confused and frustrated. She tells him about the pregnancy, which makes him happy although she is not, as 'the father is not who I thought he was'.

Meeting Danny for drinks, when Curtis tells him what Angela said, he says she must be cheating on him. His reasoning is, if they are using double condoms it is practically impossible. When Curtis returns home to pack some things to stay with Danny, Angela hides her mound of tear-soaked tissues, and they both accuse each other of infidelity before he leaves.

The Marks become even more estranged due to the Chambers and her mother. When Curtis arrives at Danny's he finds a surprise, two private strippers. Once Danny takes his to the bedroom, he awkwardly tries to make conversation with his. At Sylvia's, Angela is told to get Curtis to confess to cheating, then kick him out. Noone pays attention to both of the Marks' insistence that they still love each other.

As both of the Markses refuse to move out, they are each advised to not communicate with the other. This leads to a very uncomfortable nine-months. In addition, as Angela landed the perfume ad campaign just before discovering the pregnancy, and Mary has been away on business ever since, she desperately hides her bump. As her boss is both childless and driven, Angela fears losing this prime assignment.

Mary rushes into the office, warning that the CEO of the Japanese firm they hope will invest in the perfume expects a pitch at four. Simultaneously, Sylvia is delivering divorce papers to Danny when Curtis bolts. Danny realises he must be headed to a 'massage parlor', so the separated couple hurries behind.

Finally everyone comes together. As Angela starts to pitch to the investors, she goes into labor. Raphy contacts Dr. Bob, his mystery boyfriend. The Chambers, back together after Danny's heartfelt speech about commitment in the parlor, head to the ad agency with Curtis. The whole situation is finally resolved, as the misunderstandings are cleared up after Angela's water breaks. Soon the Marks are back together and proud parents of a baby boy.

== Cast ==
- Jerry O'Connell as Curtis Marks
- Heather Graham as Angela Marks
- John Corbett as Danny Chambers
- Lara Flynn Boyle as Mary Radcliffe
- Katie Finneran as Sylvia Chambers
- Anthony Starke as Dr. Taylor
- Brian Sills as Raphy

== Credits ==
Although credited as Lara Flynn Boyle in the opening credits, her name is spelled Laura Flynn Boyle in the closing credits. The film's opening credits scene features British singer Natasha Bedingfield's song I Wanna Have Your Babies.

== Reception ==
On Rotten Tomatoes, it has a 20% approval rating based on 5 reviews, with an average score of 4.1/10.
