= Jason Dolley =

American actor, musician, and Twitch streamer (born 1991)

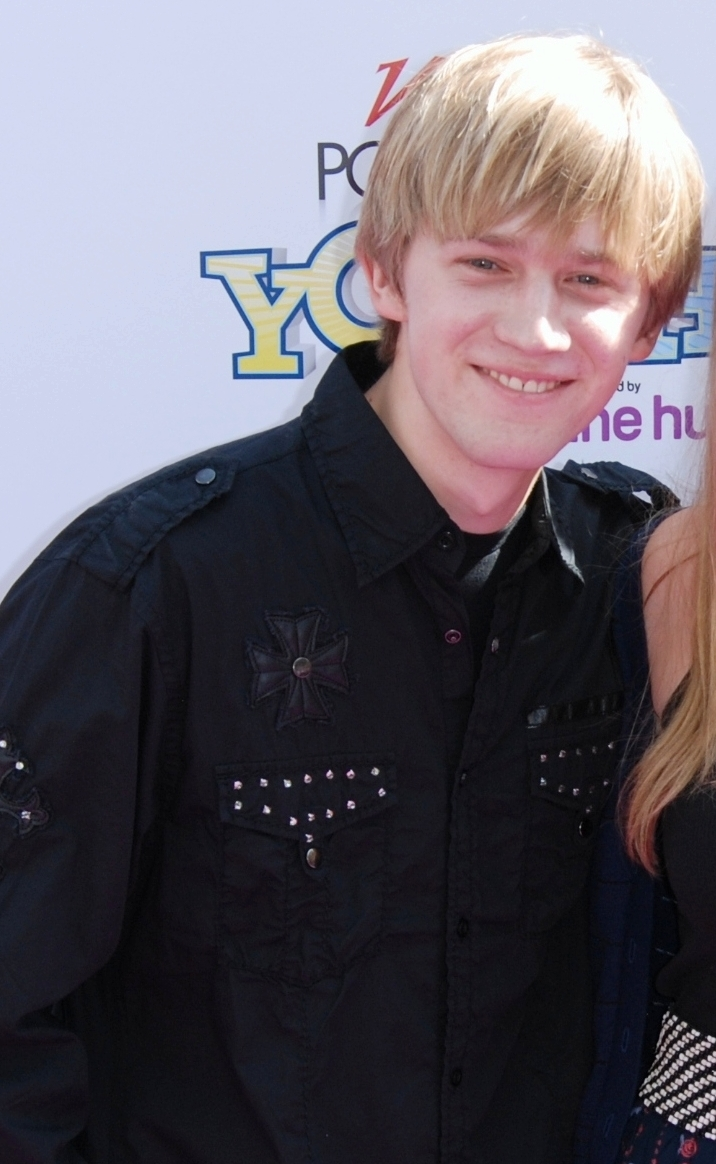
- Dolley in 2010
- Born: Jason Scott Dolley; July 5, 1991 (age 35); Los Angeles, California, U.S.
- Education: Moorpark College; California Lutheran University (BA)
- Occupations: Actor, musician
- Years active: 2002−present

Jason Scott Dolley (born July 5, 1991) is an American actor, musician, and Twitch streamer known for his roles in Disney Channel shows and movies. These include Newton "Newt" Livingston III on Cory in the House, Virgil Fox in Minutemen, Connor Kennedy in Read It and Weep, Pete Ivey in Hatching Pete, and PJ Duncan on Good Luck Charlie.

== Early life and education ==
Jason Scott Dolley was born in Los Angeles, California on July 5, 1991. In 2010, he took online courses at Moorpark College. In 2016, Dolley graduated from California Lutheran University.

== Career ==
Dolley gained his first stage experience at 11 when he and one of his brothers performed the Abbott and Costello "Who's on First?" routine in a school talent show.

His first acting jobs came that same year. He won the lead role in the award-winning short film titled Chasing Daylight with actress Jillian Clare. He was then cast by director Mel Gibson to be T.J. Savage on the ABC series Complete Savages. After Complete Savages was canceled, he starred in the film Saving Shiloh as Marty Preston, in the Disney Channel Original Movie Read It and Weep as Connor Kennedy and in the film The Air I Breathe.

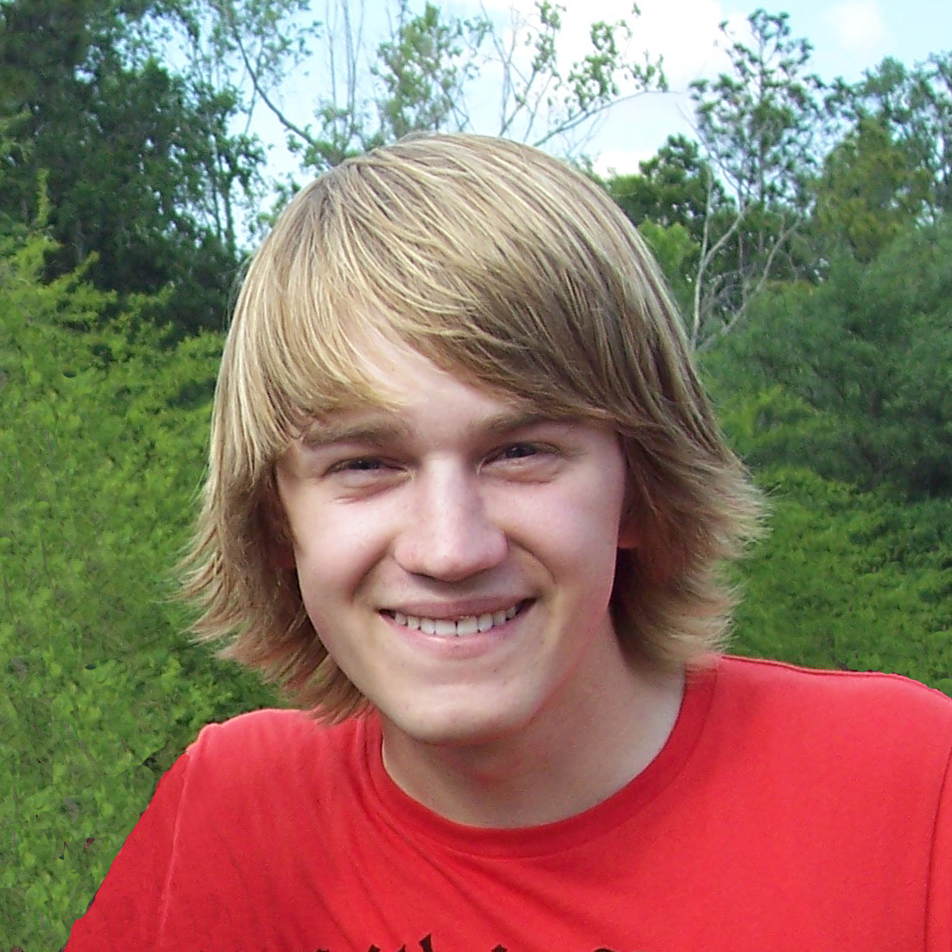
Dolley in 2008

Dolley was part of the Yellow team in the second edition of the Disney Channel Games, broadcast in mid-2007. From 2007 to 2008, Dolley starred in the Disney Channel show Cory in the House. In 2008, he appeared in the film Minutemen as Virgil Fox and was in the third edition of the Disney Channel Games on the Green Team. Dolley also guest-starred as the prince in Imagination Movers. In 2009, Jason starred in the Disney film Hatching Pete as Pete Ivey. In 2010, Dolley began appearing in his second Disney Channel Original Series, Good Luck Charlie as P.J. Duncan.

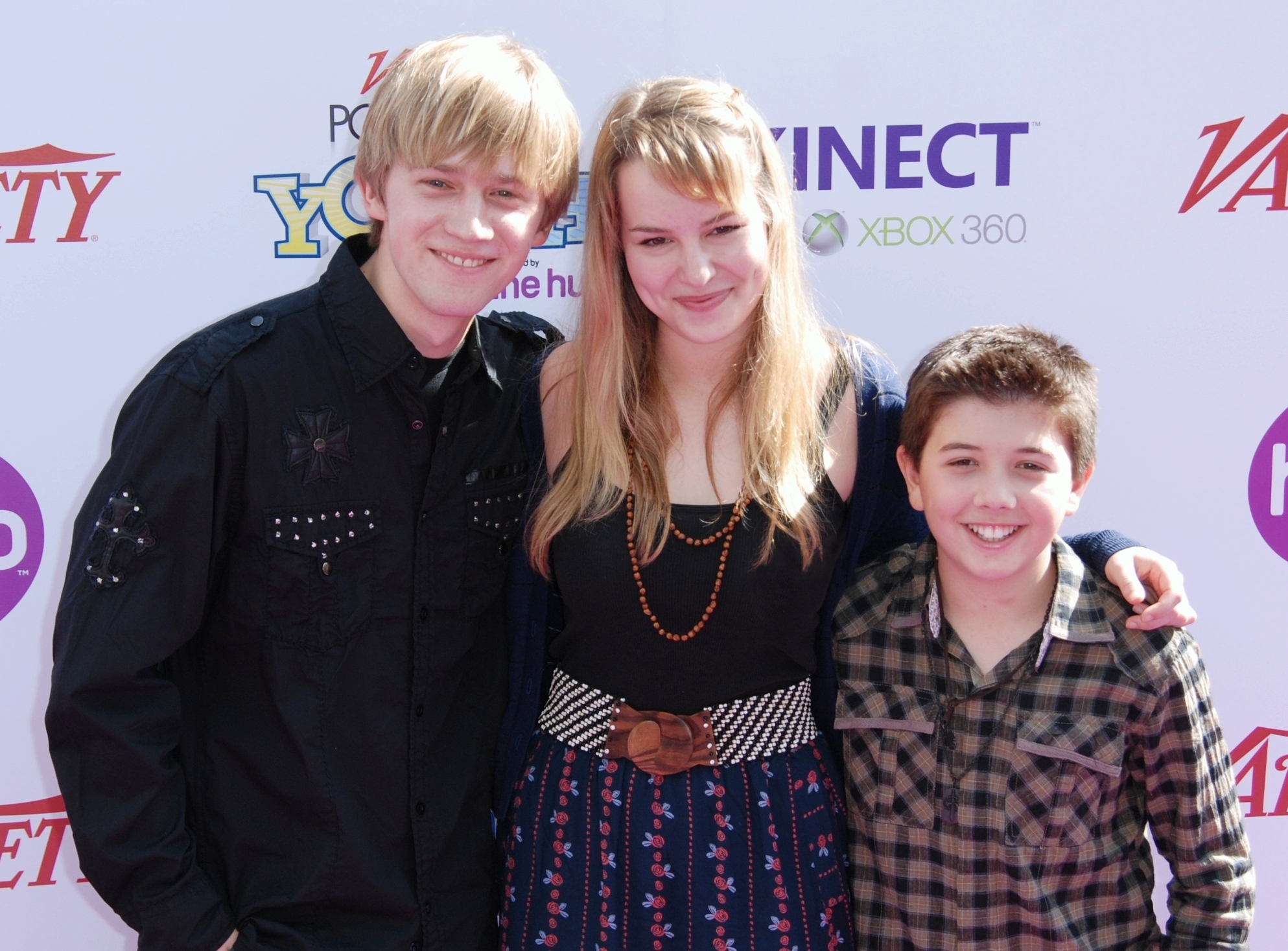
Dolley (left) with fellow Good Luck Charlie cast members Bridgit Mendler and Bradley Steven Perry in October 2010

When asked about his role in the Disney Channel Original Series family sitcom, Good Luck Charlie, he replied, "I like the realness of it. I like the more authentic tone. I like the family sitcom. That's something different for Disney, which also appealed to me." He also said in a different interview, "When I read the script, I was like, 'Oh, this is kind of cool. This is a little different. It has a Full House kind of feel. It's very family-friendly. Families can sit down and watch this and get a real laugh. I think that's what's been cool about it from the start and what's still cool about it today."

Dolley and cast appeared in a 2011 feature-length Christmas Disney Channel original movie based on the series titled Good Luck Charlie, It's Christmas!. He also voiced the character Rumble in Disney Channel's animated film Pixie Hollow Games, which also stars Brenda Song, Tiffany Thornton, and Zendaya.

== Filmography ==
Film roles
Year	Title	Role	Notes
2004	Chasing Daylight	Dylan Fox	Short
2006	Saving Shiloh	Marty Preston	
2007	The Air I Breathe	Young Pleasure	
2014	Helicopter Mom	Lloyd	
2019	Staged Killer	Jake	
2020	Secret Agent Dingledorf and His Trusty Dog Splat	Wing Nut	
2020	The Devil's Advocate	Terry	Short

Television roles
Year	Title	Role	Notes
2004–2005	Complete Savages	T.J. Savage	Main role; 19 episodes
2006	Read It and Weep	Connor Kennedy	Television film
2007–2008	Cory in the House	Newton "Newt" Livingston III	Main role; 30 episodes
2008	Minutemen	Virgil Fox	Television film
2008	Disney Channel Games	Himself	5 episodes
2008	The Replacements	Skip Tripper	Voice role' episode: "The Campiest Episode Never"
2009	Hatching Pete	Pete Ivey	Television film
2009	Imagination Movers	Prince	Episode: "A Fairy Tale Ending"
2010–2014	Good Luck Charlie	PJ Duncan	Main role; 97 episodes
2011	Pixie Hollow Games	Rumble	Television film; voice
2011	Good Luck Charlie, It's Christmas!	PJ Duncan	Television film
2013	Jessie	PJ Duncan	Episode: "Good Luck Jessie: New York City Christmas"
2014	Major Crimes	James "J-Me" Martin Elliott	Episode: "Acting Out"
2018–2019	American Housewife	Kevin	4 episodes
2018	The Ranch	Dr. Hopkins	Episode: "Part 6, Episode 5"
