= Mia Talerico =

American actress (born 2008)

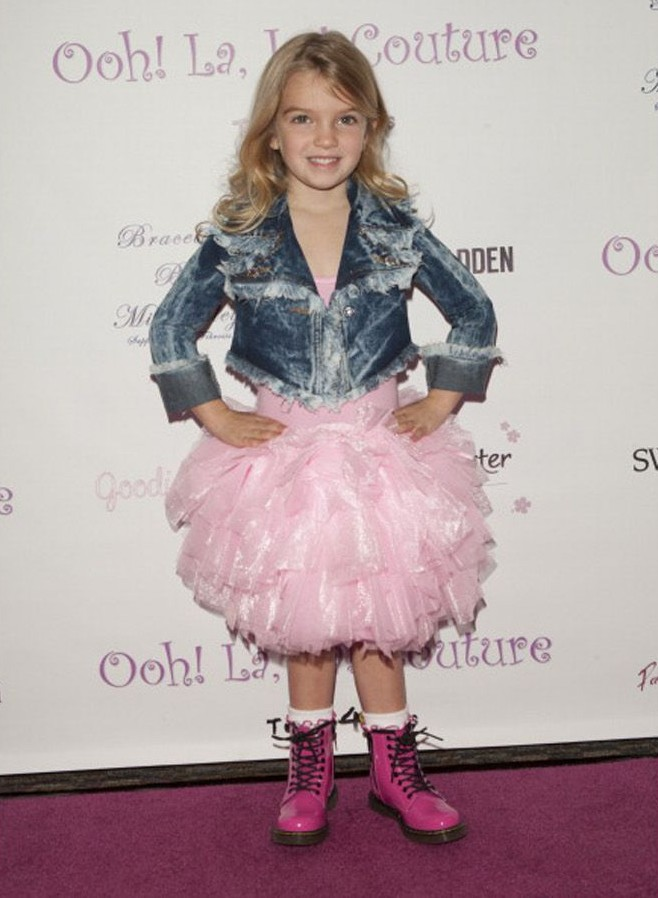
- Talerico in February 2014
- Born: September 17, 2008 (age 18); Santa Barbara, California, US
- Years active: 2010–present
- Television: Good Luck Charlie

Mia Talerico (born September 17, 2008) is an American actress. She rose to prominence for her role as Charlie Duncan in Disney Channel's sitcom Good Luck Charlie (2010–2014). Later, she starred on the Brat series Mani (2018–2022) as Paige.

== Early life and career ==
Talerico was born in Santa Barbara, California, on September 17, 2008, to Chris and Claire Talerico.

Talerico began acting at 11 months old, playing Charlie Duncan on Disney Channel's comedy series Good Luck Charlie (2010–2014). She also played the role in the Christmas special, Good Luck Charlie, It's Christmas! (2011) and in the Jessie crossover episode, Good Luck Jessie: NYC Christmas (2013). Later, she starred on the Brat's web series Mani (2018–2022) as Paige Rogge. In October 2024, Talerico was announced to play young Kelly in American Summer (2026).

== Filmography ==
Key
†	Denotes films that have not yet been released

=== Film ===
Year	Title	Role	Notes
2015	Shadow Theory	Kathryn	Short film
2017	Photographic Memory	Larissa McAdams	Short film
2026	American Summer	Young Kelly	

=== Television ===
Year	Title	Role	Notes
2010–2014	Good Luck Charlie	Charlotte "Charlie" Duncan	Main role
2011	So Random!	Herself	Episode: "Leigh-Allyn Baker and Mia Talerico"
2011	Good Luck Charlie, It's Christmas!	Charlotte "Charlie" Duncan	Television film
2013	Jessie	Charlotte "Charlie" Duncan	Episode: "Good Luck Jessie: NYC Christmas"
2018–2022	Mani	Paige Rogge	Main role
2023	Conrad	Molly	Episode: "Pilot D.O.A"
