= Arlene Sanford =

American film and television director

- Occupation(s): Film director, television director
- Years active: 1979–present

Arlene Sanford is an American film and television director.

Sanford has directed for several notable television series and several motion picture and television films which include A Very Brady Sequel (1996), I'll Be Home for Christmas (1998) and Twelve Men of Christmas (2009).

Sanford has been nominated for two Primetime Emmy Awards for Outstanding Directing for a Drama Series for her work on the David E. Kelley-produced series Ally McBeal (in 1999) and Boston Legal (in 2008).

== Filmography ==
- Almost Family (2019) TV series
  - episode #9: "Rehabilitated AF"
- Grand Hotel (2019) TV series
  - episode #6: "Love Thy Neighbor"
- Pretty Little Liars: The Perfectionists (2019) TV series
- Life Sentence (2018) TV series
  - episode #5: "Wes Side Story"
- Good Luck Charlie, It's Christmas! (2011) TV film
- Pretty Little Liars (2010–2016) TV series
- Twelve Men of Christmas (2009) TV film
- My Boys (2006) TV Series
- Psych (2006) TV series
- Weeds (2005) TV series
  - episode #6: "Dead in the Nethers"
- The Bad Girl's Guide (2005) TV series
- Boston Legal (2004) TV series
  - episode 1.09 "A Greater Good
  - episode 2.02 "Schadenfreude"
- Desperate Housewives (2004) TV series
  - episode 1.03 "Pretty Little Picture"
  - episode 1.05 "Come In, Stranger"
  - episode 1.13 "Your Fault"
  - episode 1.16 "The Ladies Who Lunch"
  - episode 1.19 "Live Alone and Like It"
  - episode 2.03 "You'll Never Get Away from Me"
  - episode 2.10 "Coming Home"
- Miss Match (2003) TV Series
- Eve (2003) TV series
- Everwood (2002) TV Series
  - episode 1.05 "Deer God"
  - episode 1.17 "Everwood, Confidential"
  - episode 1.19 "The Miracle of Everwood"
- Frank McKlusky, C.I. (2002)
- Go Fish (2001) TV series
  - episode "Go Wrestle"
- Boston Public (2000) TV series
- Ed (2000) TV Series
- Gilmore Girls (2000) TV series
  - episode 1.02 "The Lorelais' First Day at Chilton"
- Battery Park (2000) TV series
- Malcolm in the Middle (2000) TV series
  - episode 1.02 "Red Dress"
  - episode 1.11 "Funeral"
  - episode 2.12 "Krelboyne Girl"
- Ally (1999) TV series
- The West Wing (1999) TV series
  - episode 1.12 "He Shall, from Time to Time"
- Once and Again (1999) TV series
- I'll Be Home for Christmas (1998) Theatrical film
- Dawson's Creek (1998) TV series
- Ally McBeal (1997) TV series
  - episode 1.04 "The Affair"
  - episode 2.16 "Sex, Lies and Politics"
  - episode 2.18 "Those Lips, That Hand"
  - episode 3.06 "Changes"
  - episode 4.06 "Tis the Season"
  - episode 5.16 and 5.17 "Love Is All Around"
- Temporarily Yours (1997) TV series
- A Very Brady Sequel (1996) Theatrical film
- The Last Frontier (1996) TV series
- Too Something (1995) TV Series
- Caroline in the City (1995) TV series
- The Naked Truth (1995) TV series
- Pride & Joy (1995) TV Series
- Friends (1994) TV series
  - episode 1.06 "The One with the Butt"
- All American Girl (1994) TV series
- The Babymaker: The Dr. Cecil Jacobson Story (1994) TV film
- Arly Hanks (1993) TV film
- Sisters (1991) TV series
- Ferris Bueller (1990) TV Series
- Dream On (1990) TV series
- Coach (1989) TV series
- The Wonder Years (1988) TV series
  - episode "Dance with Me"
- Eisenhower & Lutz (1988) TV series
- Hooperman (1987) TV Series
- The Days and Nights of Molly Dodd (1987) TV series
- Designing Women (1986) TV series
- Welcome Home (1986)
- Rituals (1985) TV series
