= Jascha Washington =

American actor and songwriter (born 1989)

- Born: Jascha Akili Washington; June 21, 1989 (age 37); Kings County, California, U.S.
- Occupations: Actor, songwriter
- Years active: 1996–2012
- Children: 3

Jascha Akili Washington (born June 21, 1989) is an American former actor and songwriter. He is best known for Big Momma's House (2000), Big Momma's House 2 (2006), and Like Mike 2: Streetball (2006).

== Life and career ==
Washington was born on June 21, 1989, in Kings County, California, and debuted on television in 1997 on the episode "A Reverend Runs Through It" of the series Brooklyn South. He first appeared on film a year later as Will Smith's character's son Eric in Enemy of the State (1998). His notable film and television roles include an episode of The Suite Life of Zack & Cody as character Drew, Trent Pierce in Big Momma's House and its sequel in a cameo role, Dr. Gideon's son Eli on Gideon's Crossing, and as Jerome in Like Mike 2: Streetball (2006). He guest-starred on The Bernie Mac Show episode "It's a Wonderful Wife" and in the series House M.D. in the episode "Family" in 2007.

Washington presented a project called The Final at After Dark Horrorfest 2010.

His most recent appearance was Kendall in Frenemies.

Besides appearing in over a dozen films, he has worked in television films, television series, music videos, and appeared in a handful of commercials.

Washington did not appear in Big Mommas: Like Father, Like Son as Trent Pierce, the role he played in the first two films. He has been replaced with Brandon T. Jackson.

In August 2013, Washington welcomed a baby girl into his family, and in March 2015, his second child, a boy, was born.

In January 2017, his third child, a boy, was born.

== Filmography ==
=== Film ===
Year	Title	Role	Notes
1998	Enemy of the State	Eric Dean	
1999	The Wood	Mike's younger brother	
2000	Big Momma's House	Trent Pierce	
2000	The Visit	Young Alex Waters	
2002	Snow Dogs	Young Theodore 'Ted' Brooks	
2002	Antwone Fisher	Jesse (age 8)	
2006	Last Holiday	Darius	
2006	Big Momma's House 2	Trent Pierce	
2006	Like Mike 2: Streetball	Jerome "Triple J" Jenkins, Jr.	
2010	The Final	Kurtis	

=== Television ===
Year	Title	Role	Notes
1997	Brooklyn South	Theron Weeks	Episode: "A Reverend Runs Through It"
1997	ER	Hector	Episode: "Freak Show"
1998	The Parent 'Hood	Lamont	Episode: "Stand by Boo"
1998	Fantasy Island	Ari	Episode: "Superfriends"
1999	Early Edition	Chris Clark	Episode: "Number One with a Bullet"
1999	Michael Jordan: An American Hero	Larry Jordan (age 7)	TV film
1999	Judging Amy	Vaden Marquadt	Episode: "Near Death Experience"
1999	Snoops	Daniel Jackson	Episode: "The Grinch"
2000	Ali: An American Hero	Rudy (young)	TV film
2000	Gideon's Crossing	Eli Gideon	TV series
2001–2002	Soul Food	Avery	2 episodes
2002	My Sister's Keeper	Earl	TV film
2002	The Guardian	DeShawn Tralins	Episode: "In Loco Parentis"
2003	The Twilight Zone	Lucas Tyler	Episode: "Memphis"
2003	Wanda at Large	Drayton Hawkins	Episode: "Unaired Pilot"
2003	One on One	Flex Jr.	Episode: "It's a Miserable Life"
2004	The Bernie Mac Show	Rich	-
2004	The District	Miles Hendrix	Episode: "Ten Thirty-Three"
2004–2005	Da Boom Crew	Nate	Voice, main role
2005	Jack & Bobby	Brad Whistler	Episode: "Time out of Life"
2005	The Suite Life of Zack & Cody	Drew	Episode: "Hotel Hangout"
2005	Still Standing	Howard	Episode: "Still the Boss"
2006	Criminal Minds	James Barfield	Episode: "Profiler, Profiled"
2007	House	Nick	Episode: "Family"
2010	CSI: Crime Scene Investigation	Student	Episode: "Internal Combustion"
2012	Frenemies	Kendall Brandon	Disney Channel Original Movie
