= Big Momma's House =

2000 film by Raja Gosnell

- Theatrical release poster
- Directed by: Raja Gosnell
- Screenplay by: Darryl Quarles; Don Rhymer
- Story by: Darryl Quarles
- Produced by: David T. Friendly; Michael Green
- Starring: Martin Lawrence; Nia Long; Paul Giamatti; Terrence Howard
- Cinematography: Michael D. O'Shea
- Edited by: Bruce Green; Kent Beyda
- Music by: Richard Gibbs
- Production companies: Regency Enterprises; Runteldat Entertainment
- Distributed by: 20th Century Fox
- Release date: June 2, 2000
- Running time: 99 minutes
- Countries: United States; Germany
- Language: English
- Budget: $30 million
- Box office: $174 million

Big Momma's House is a 2000 crime comedy film, directed by Raja Gosnell, and written by Darryl Quarles and Don Rhymer. The film stars Martin Lawrence as an FBI agent who is tasked with tracking down an escaped convict and his loot, by going undercover as the estranged grandmother of the convict's former girlfriend, unaware of the bond he will form with her. The film also stars Nia Long, Paul Giamatti, and Terrence Howard.

Big Momma's House was released by 20th Century Fox on June 2, 2000. The film received mostly negative reviews from critics, but grossed $174 million worldwide against a $30 million budget. Its success led to two sequels: Big Momma's House 2 (2006) and Big Mommas: Like Father, Like Son (2011).

== Plot ==
Malcolm Turner and John Maxwell are two FBI agents who are assigned by their boss to track the escaped convict Lester Vesco, who was serving a life sentence for murder and armed robbery at a bank. Malcolm and John learn that Lester may be seeking to find his ex-girlfriend, Sherry Pierce, an employee of the bank who is suspected of supplying him with a key to the vault, as the money that was stolen was never recovered. Malcolm and John decide to stake out the house of Sherry's estranged grandmother, Hattie Mae Pierce, an obese, elderly African American woman whom her friends affectionately call Big Momma in Cartersville, Georgia.

After rigging Big Momma's house with cameras, Malcolm and John learn that she plans to leave to look after an ill friend. Seizing on the opportunity, Malcolm and John create a prosthetic mask and fat suit, so that Malcolm can assume Big Momma's identity and infiltrate the Pierce household. To avoid suspicion, Malcolm must also maintain the real Big Momma's lifestyle. This includes dealing with her lecherous boyfriend, assuming her occupation as a midwife, and attending self-defense classes led by dim-witted security guard Nolan, whom the agents are later forced to recruit when he stumbles onto their operation.

During this time, Malcolm bonds with Sherry and her ten-year-old son, Trent, both in disguise and in his cover story as a handyman hired by Big Momma. He finds nothing to link her to the robbery, nor to the missing money's location. After attending a church service with them, where Malcolm indirectly compels Sherry in his disguise to not hold any secrets, Malcolm discovers the missing money in Trent's footlocker when he returns home to a surprise birthday party. His discovery is witnessed by Sherry, who tells him she had no idea what Lester was planning and did not report her key was stolen out of fear of being fired. Shortly thereafter, John discovers that the real Big Momma has returned home. In his efforts to stop her re-entering the house, John instructs Nolan to lock her out, only for Nolan to accidentally lock Malcolm out. Lester tracks Sherry down to Big Momma's house, and, thinking she has betrayed him to the FBI, takes her hostage. Malcolm swiftly breaks into the house, whereupon he tackles Lester after John is shot. In the ensuing fight, Malcolm's disguise is revealed to everyone as he subdues Lester. After Lester is arrested and the money recovered, Malcolm notices Sherry and Trent refusing to speak to him, heartbroken by his deception.

Seeking forgiveness, Malcolm attends the Sunday morning church service, where he gives a heartfelt speech to Sherry and Trent declaring he genuinely loves them. Big Momma expresses forgiveness and reconciliation to Malcolm, and the church crowd cheers as Malcolm and Sherry kiss, before Big Momma and the choir sing "Oh Happy Day".

== Cast ==
- Martin Lawrence as Malcolm Turner, an undercover FBI agent.
- Nia Long as Sherry Pierce, Malcolm's suspect-turned-love interest.
- Paul Giamatti as Agent Jonathan "John" Maxwell, Malcolm's rookie undercover partner
- Terrence Howard as Lester Vesco, Sherry's criminal ex-boyfriend.
- Anthony Anderson as Nolan, a dim-witted security guard.
- Jascha Washington as Trent Pierce, Sherry's 10-year-old son.
- Ella Mitchell as Hattie Mae 'Big Momma' Pierce, Sherry's estranged grandmother.
- Phyllis Applegate as Sadie, Big Momma's nosy and jealous neighbor.
- Starletta DuPois as Miss Patterson, a neighbor and friend of Big Momma.
- Jessie Mae Holmes as Miss Other Patterson, another friend and neighbor with the same surname as Miss Patterson.
- Tichina Arnold as Ritha, a pregnant woman and Nolan's younger sister.
- Octavia Spencer as Twila, Big Momma's neighbor and friend of Ritha and Sherry.
- Nicole Prescott as Lena, Big Momma's neighbor and friend of Ritha and Sherry
- Cedric the Entertainer as the Reverend.
- Carl Wright as Ben Rawley, Big Momma's lecherous boyfriend.
- Edwin Hodge as Basketball Teen #1
- Aldis Hodge as Basketball Teen #2

== Production ==
After working on his newest release, Never Been Kissed, Raja Gosnell was commissioned to direct the film in July 1999. The film was set in Georgia, but filmed in Southern California in early 2000. Production was originally set to begin on October 10, 1999, but was delayed when Martin Lawrence was rushed to the hospital after collapsing in sweltering heat while running with multiple layers of clothing to lose weight for the role.

Nia Long was cast in the film after she chose not to portray the role of Alex Munday in Charlie's Angels. The prosthetic makeup used for Big Momma was created by Greg Cannom and Captive Audience. Cannom had previously created the makeup used by Robin Williams in both Mrs. Doubtfire and Bicentennial Man.

== Music ==
A soundtrack containing hip hop music was released on May 30, 2000, by So So Def Records. The film's theme song was "Bounce with Me" by Lil Bow Wow. The soundtrack was also a moderate success and has been certified gold since its release. As well as Lil Bow Wow, the soundtrack featured artists such as Jermaine Dupri, Da Brat, and Black Dave, whose single Go Big Girl can be heard briefly in the film. It peaked at number 41 on the Billboard 200 and number 12 on the Top R&B/Hip-Hop Albums and spawned two hit singles, "Bounce with Me" and "I've Got to Have It".

== Reception ==
=== Box office ===
Big Momma's House was released on June 2, 2000, and became a surprise hit in its opening weekend in North America, making $25.6 million and becoming the second-placed film behind Mission: Impossible 2 at that time. Upon opening, it had the highest opening for a Martin Lawrence film, surpassing Life. The film itself would later go on to gross over $117 million at the US box office and just under $174 million worldwide.

In the UK, the film premiered in second place behind Gladiator, collecting $1.2 million during its opening weekend. It would also rank second behind that film in Brazil, making a total opening gross of $585,250. The film opened in Australia in second place below Scary Movie with $901,000 from its first weekend.

=== Critical response ===
On Rotten Tomatoes, the film has an approval rating of 31% based on 80 reviews, and an average rating of 4.7/10. The site's critical consensus reads: "Big Momma's House is funny in some parts, but it is essentially a one-joke movie." On Metacritic, the film has a weighted average score of 33 out of 100 based on 27 critics, indicating "generally unfavorable" reviews. Audiences polled by CinemaScore gave the film an average grade of "A" on an A+ to F scale.

Roger Ebert of the Chicago Sun-Times, while admitting to laughing at many of the jokes, also felt there were tasteless moments, thinking it could be "redeemed by comedy", such as the opening toilet sequence. Todd McCarthy of Variety praised Lawrence's "engaging" performance and the old woman makeup, but criticized the film's script. Eric D. Snider said, "It's The Nutty Professor meets Mrs. Doubtfire, but without the humor of the former or the heart of the latter".

The film, and the series as a whole, have been derided by some as typical of "representations of the big black woman that have appeared in mass marketed comedies" which at the same time devalue the women by casting "male actors wearing Latex fat suits". One review of the third film sarcastically commented that the Big Momma's House series rigidly follows the classic Hollywood trilogy structure.

== Sequels ==
The film spawned two sequels in the Big Momma series: Big Momma's House 2 (2006) and Big Mommas: Like Father, Like Son (2011). Both sequels were light-hearted and more family-friendly than the original story, but saw reduced takings in the box office, and were panned by film critics.

== Home media ==
Big Momma's House was released on DVD and VHS on November 28, 2000, by 20th Century Fox Home Entertainment. The THX certified DVD version features behind-the-scenes footage, deleted scenes, an audio commentary, a theatrical trailer, a preview for Me, Myself & Irene, TV spots and two music videos. A Blu-ray edition of the film was released on September 6, 2011.
