= List of Good Luck Charlie episodes =

Good Luck Charlie is an American sitcom that originally aired on Disney Channel from April 4, 2010, to February 16, 2014. The series revolves around Teddy Duncan (Bridgit Mendler), a teenage girl who makes video diaries for her little sister Charlie (Mia Talerico) about her family and life as a teenager. The video diaries are made to help Charlie when she grows up. The series also stars Jason Dolley as PJ; Bradley Steven Perry as Gabe; and Leigh-Allyn Baker and Eric Allan Kramer as Amy and Bob Duncan, the children's parents.

== Series overview ==
Season	Episodes	Originally released	
Season	Episodes	First released	Last released
1	26	April 4, 2010	January 30, 2011
2	30	February 20, 2011	November 27, 2011
Film		December 2, 2011	
3	21	May 6, 2012	January 20, 2013
4	20	April 28, 2013	February 16, 2014

== Episodes ==
=== Season 1 (2010–11) ===
No. overall	No. in season	Title	Directed by	Written by	Original release date	Prod. code	U.S. viewers (millions)
1	1	"Study Date"	Shelley Jensen	Drew Vaupen & Phil Baker	April 4, 2010	101	4.69
Teddy Duncan records her family's daily life to help her younger sister, Charlie Duncan, in any possible scenario in life. Nurse Amy Duncan announces she is going back to work again and has her exterminator husband, Bob Duncan, take care of Charlie, as she does not count on any of the other children to be responsible, except Teddy, who asks her if she can go to the library to meet up with Spencer Walsh to study. Amy forbids, as she needs all hands on deck, not even counting on Bob himself. Even though Teddy is forbidden from going to the library, she invites Spencer over to study but soon start to flirt, but she is often interrupted by her older brother, musician PJ Duncan and his best friend, Emmett Heglin, while they rehearse for their band, PJ And The Vibe. On the other hand, Teddy's younger brother, Gabe Duncan, seems to be forgotten in the family, as he was not fed for breakfast, so he goes to his neighbor, Mrs. Dabney's house to look for food. Teddy is forced to go get him, and Bob accidentally slips on a rubber duck while carrying Charlie down the stairs. PJ takes him to the hospital, but Bob asks him to make sure Amy does not see him, as she does not want him to think Bob is irresponsible. Amy spots him and questions him about Charlie. When he reveals he dropped her, Amy is shocked. Guest stars: Patricia Belcher as Mrs. Dabney, Shane Harper as Spencer, Micah Williams as Emmett, Tyrel Jackson Williams as Jasper, Mike Grief as Neal Note: This episode was posted as a free download on the iTunes Store on March 19, 2010.
2	2	"Baby Come Back"	Shelley Jensen	Dan Staley	April 11, 2010	102	3.81
Teddy finds Amy and Bob speaking babyish towards Charlie, so she tells them to have a night alone. They take Teddy's words into consideration, and that day they leave to go to dinner, leaving PJ in charge of Charlie. He takes her to the park, where he meets Captain Stretchy, an entertainer, and a girl named Emma, who has also brought her baby brother. after a while, PJ takes Charlie home. Teddy then tells PJ that he brought the wrong baby home, having switched babies with Emma. Teddy and PJ bring along Gabe. They go around town and spend the whole day searching for Charlie and Emma. They decide to tell Amy and Bob about Charlie. They find Amy and Bob at a Mexican restaurant. When Teddy walks towards Amy and Bob, she spots Emma in a table next to Amy and Bob's. Gabe distracts them with a magic trick, while Teddy swaps babies with Emma. At home, Amy finds out about Charlie. Guest stars: Mike Hagerty as Captain Stretchy, Gilland Jones as Emma Note: In the United Kingdom, this episode had 170,000 viewers when it premiered on June 12, 2010.
3	3	"The Curious Case of Mr. Dabney"	Eric Dean Seaton	Christopher Vane	April 18, 2010	106	4.11
PJ and Gabe suspect that their neighbor Mrs. Dabney has killed her husband, Mr. Dabney, and they try to find evidence to prove it, while babysitting Charlie. Meanwhile, Teddy becomes jealous that her best friend Ivy has become texting buddies with Amy, which Teddy thinks is lame, so she decides to spend time with Ivy's mother, Mary Lou Wentz, who is unexciting and is very boring, so Teddy learns that Amy is not as lame as she originally thought. Guest stars: Patricia Belcher as Mrs. Dabney, Raven Goodwin as Ivy, Ellia English as Mary Lou
4	4	"Double Whammy"	Eric Dean Seaton	Erika Kaestle & Patrick McCarthy	April 25, 2010	104	3.38
Amy convinces Teddy to audition to be the school's unlucky ram mascot Whammy, due to Amy being Whammy when she was Teddy's age. Teddy does not want to be Whammy, so she tries to throw the tryout; coincidentally it turns out she was the only one who tried out, so Teddy becomes the Whammy. Her mother is excited, but when Teddy reveals she never wanted to be Whammy in a huge outburst, Amy is dismayed and decides to fill in for Teddy at the game, but the rival school North High kidnaps Amy, thinking she was Teddy, so she attacks them and returns to the game, where Teddy is being attacked by North High's Viking mascot. Amy attacks the Viking and she and Teddy take down the Viking. Meanwhile, PJ worries that he is going bald like Bob; later, he challenges Emmett to a baby race with his nephew Mason against Charlie. Mason was ahead, but Charlie wins the race and takes her first steps while doing so. Guest stars: Raven Goodwin as Ivy, Stephanie Hodge as Ms. Covington, Micah Williams as Emmett, Max Carver as Brad
5	5	"Dance Off"	Eric Dean Seaton	Christopher Vane	May 2, 2010	108	3.59
A moonlight dance is approaching at Teddy's school. Teddy asks Spencer out for the big night and Ivy asks out Emmett, so she and Teddy can get rides to the dance. Teddy tries to get her first kiss from Spencer, but Emmett, who also likes Teddy, tries to distract Spencer, which leads to a dance-off between the two. However, Teddy gets her first kiss with Spencer anyway. Meanwhile, Gabe tries to get his parents to argue at a parent-teacher meeting because he has been lying to his teacher and saying that he could not complete his assignments because of his parents arguing, so he releases the class' pet rat, which runs around the room scaring everyone. Guest stars: Raven Goodwin as Ivy, Micah Williams as Emmett, Shane Harper as Spencer, Lorna Scott as Mrs. Mellish Note: In this episode Teddy does not say "Good Luck Charlie" in her video diary.
6	6	"Charlie Did It!"	Adam Weissman	Jim Gerkin	May 9, 2010	107	3.86
When Teddy is supposed to be watching Gabe and Charlie, they make a huge mess in the kitchen. Amy makes Teddy watch Charlie and Gabe is not allowed to use any kind of electronics for the rest of the day. Meanwhile, Teddy goes to the store and Gabe tags along. At the store, Charlie steals a pair of sunglasses at a grocery store. The rude owner Hugo "arrests" her. Teddy and Gabe are in desperate need to leave. Teddy befriends Alice, (Hayley Holmes), a grocery store employee who gets fired after helping them escape. Back in the Duncan residence, PJ and Emmett try to create a jingle for Bob's extermination business. Guest stars: Larry Joe Campbell as Hugo, Micah Williams as Emmett, Hayley Holmes as Alice
7	7	"Butt Dialing Duncans"	Bob Koherr	Jim Gerkin	May 16, 2010	118	3.74
Bob gives Teddy and PJ new cell phones. Teddy tries to fool Amy into thinking that she is a "cool mom" by hanging with her to attend a midnight screening of Dusk (a parody of Twilight). But when she accidentally butt-dials her mother and says the whole thing, Amy and Ivy's mother get revenge by embarrassing Teddy and Ivy at the premiere. Later, the girls apologize. Meanwhile, PJ is stuck doing a science project with Van Brunt, the school bully, but PJ accidentally butt-dials him a voicemail scorning him. Gabe gets a new remote control helicopter, and tries to get rid of Charlie's new singing stuffed horse, although fails to do so. Guest stars: Raven Goodwin as Ivy, Micah Williams as Emmett, Ellia English as Mary Lou, Adam Cagley as George Van Brundt, Wendle Josepher as Mrs. Jeter, Doug Haley as Walter, Matthew Moy as Usher
8	8	"Charlie is 1"	Adam Weissman	Andrew Orenstein	May 23, 2010	110	3.69
It is Charlie's first birthday and the special day brings back crazy memories on the day she was born, including Bob and PJ's fishing trip which leads to a bear sleeping in their van so they are forced to steal a couple's motorcycles. Teddy and Ivy's play about people overcoming differences and coming together and Amy in labor going to the hospital to deliver the baby. Gabe is home alone due to his family forgetting about him, but Mrs. Dabney catches him and takes him to the hospital anyway. Towards the end of the crazy day of Charlie's birth, the Duncans have a new sister and take a family picture. After the big story of the day Charlie was born, Mad Dog and Francis make a surprise visit to the Duncans with a motorcycle jacket for Charlie and Amy accepts them and they are now Charlie's godparents. Guest stars: Patricia Belcher as Mrs. Dabney, Raven Goodwin as Ivy, Shishir Kurup as Dr. Singh, Diane Delano as Mad Dog, M. Darnell Suttles as Francis, Sarah Baker as Carla, Jon Molerio as Nelson
9	9	"Up a Tree"	Eric Dean Seaton	Erika Kaestle & Patrick McCarthy	June 6, 2010	105	2.93
Bob makes a deal with Mrs. Dabney that if he chops down their tree that blocks her sunlight, she will keep her barking dog in her house. The tree, which houses PJ and Teddy's childhood tree house, has sentimental value, so they stage a sit-in protest to prevent it from getting chopped down, because they want Charlie to experience it. Gabe and Amy join the strike, but Bob wants Mrs. Dabney's yapping dog to shut up. They all wind up in the tree house and it fell to the ground. However, when Mrs. Dabney reveals the dog is not hers and she is just watching it for a neighbor, the Duncans launch a water balloon at her. In the end, Bob, PJ, and Gabe build a new tree house. Guest star: Patricia Belcher as Mrs. Dabney
10	10	"Take Mel Out to the Ball Game"	Eric Dean Seaton	Andrew Orenstein	June 13, 2010	103	3.45
Teddy realizes that she has a great-uncle named Mel through her father but also learns that they do not speak to each other any more. So she and Ivy go to meet Uncle Mel to find out what happened. After they meet, she learns that he loves baseball. He convinces Teddy to sneak him out of the nursing home. When they go to a baseball game, Teddy learns that Uncle Mel loves baseball a little too much when he causes quite a ruckus, including after he moons the team on the Jumbotron and the police get involved. Afterwards, Teddy invites Mel over to end their argument and discovers the reason they hated each other was because when Bob was ten, Mel was his baseball coach and, while attempting to make Bob a better player, ended up humiliating him in front of the team. Meanwhile, PJ and Gabe meet a photographer who offered to pay them $100 to use Charlie as a baby model and do it behind Amy's back when she did not approve of it. Guest stars: Blake Clark as Mel, Raven Goodwin as Ivy, John Ross Bowie as Walter, Mary Pat Gleason as Rita
11	11	"Boys Meet Girls"	Eric Dean Seaton	Phil Baker & Drew Vaupen	June 27, 2010	109	3.15
When PJ meets a cute girl, Madison, at his new job at Kwikki Chikki, Emmett becomes upset that PJ is always putting his girlfriend before their activities. Coincidentally, both PJ and Amy learn that Bob actually used to date Madison's mother, Katherine. Meanwhile, Teddy spots that Gabe is getting picked on at school by a girl named Jo, but finds out she really has a crush on him and that she beats him up because Gabe is a hunk. Guest stars: G. Hannelius as Jo, Micah Williams as Emmett, Molly Burnett as Madison, Mia Cottet as Katherine, Jason Shipman as Trevor
12	12	"Kit and Kaboodle"	Bob Koherr	Drew Vaupen & Phil Baker	July 11, 2010	111	5.03
Gabe gets his first crush, on a girl named Kit; he then lies to her by saying he is an only child so they can have something in common after advice by Amy. Meanwhile, Mrs. Dabney asks Teddy to cat-sit her cat Kaboodle and Teddy thinks the cat is sick because he is just lying around. PJ uses Charlie to make more money on deliveries by saying he is watching her while his mother is in the hospital, not mentioning she actually works there. Guest stars: Patricia Belcher as Mrs. Dabney/Virginia, Ryan Newman as Kit, Maribeth Monroe as Dana, Rose Abdoo as Dr. Tushy, Miriam Flynn as Jane
13	13	"Teddy's Little Helper"	Bob Koherr	Michael Fitzpatrick	August 1, 2010	112	4.97
Teddy tries warming up to her English teacher Mr. Dingwall by having Charlie participate in her oral presentation on the book Animal Farm after seeing him take a liking to her, but when Charlie accidentally vomits on him due to her eating some bad fish sticks, the plan goes downhill. Meanwhile, Gabe and his basketball team fire Bob as their coach and hire Amy instead, after winning their first game under her guidance, but soon realize their mistake due to her "brush it off" nature. Also, PJ begins to spend way too much time with Amy's friends. Guest stars: Raven Goodwin as Ivy, Patrick Bristow as Mr. Dingwall, Tucker Albrizzi as Nick, Kelly Ebsary as Angie
14	14	"Blankie Go Bye-Bye"	Bob Koherr	Jim Gerkin	August 15, 2010	113	N/A
Teddy accidentally puts Charlie's blanket in the donation pile instead of in the laundry pile. She goes to look for it at the thrift shop but gets locked in the back of the donation truck. Meanwhile, PJ take Teddy's advice and plans a Moroccan feast for their parents' wedding anniversary. To celebrate their anniversary, Gabe, Amy and Bob go to the movie, but Charlie wrecks the feast by starting a one-baby food fight. Guest stars: Jon Reep as Leslie, Todd Bosley as Aziz, Glenda Redfield as Kelly, Patrick McCarthy as Patrick
15	15	"Charlie Goes Viral"	Eric Dean Seaton	Erika Kaestle & Patrick McCarthy	August 29, 2010	114	4.25
After PJ creates a funny video of Charlie, he posts it on the Internet; the video becomes an instant worldwide sensation. Since the "Farty Charlie" is so popular, the Duncans are interviewed live on TV. Meanwhile, Teddy meets Spencer's parents, Paul and Linda. Teddy is impressed by their sophistication and peaceful lifestyle in comparison to the Duncans' loud and messy home. Paul and Linda watch the Duncan interview on TV, not knowing that they are Teddy's family, and insult them. Teddy reveals to them that that is her family and she has been hanging out at their house pretending to be a part of the Walsh family, but Teddy finally accepts that she is Duncan, and for that, she is proud of. Guest stars: Shane Harper as Spencer, Maurice Godin as Paul, Stacey Travis as Linda, Ryun Yu as Rick
16	16	"Duncan's Got Talent"	Eric Dean Seaton	Phil Baker & Drew Vaupen	September 12, 2010	115	3.82
Spencer decides to help Teddy with her dance routine for the school talent show, but when he realizes she is terrible he fakes an injury to get out of it. When she finds out, she is upset, and dances with Emmett for the show instead. Still, Teddy is humiliated at the talent show. The next day, Teddy and Spencer make up. Meanwhile, Jo convinces Gabe that she will help him win the class president election but instead she purposely sabotages him and runs for election herself. Guest stars: Raven Goodwin as Ivy, Micah Williams as Emmett, Shane Harper as Spencer, G. Hannelius as Jo
17	17	"Kwikki Chick"	Eric Dean Seaton	Dan Staley	September 19, 2010	116	3.00
Teddy needs money for a new cell phone and gets a job as the neighborhood dog walker, but it is disgusting. PJ gives Mitch, his boss at Kwikki Chikki, an idea for a new spokesmodel to bring in more customers, but when he expects Mitch to give the job to him, he makes Teddy the new spokesmodel after she walks into the restaurant. Teddy then comes up with a plan to get herself fired in order to give her brother the spotlight he deserves. Meanwhile, Amy sings a song with Charlie at her daycare and gets very competitive with the other mothers. Gabe uses a mouse to play a trick on Bob. Guest stars: Lauren Bowles as Elaine, David Arnott as Mitch, Martin Spanjers as Justin, Kallie Flynn Childress as Crystal, Ayesha Alexander as Beautiful Girl
18	18	"Charlie in Charge"	Bob Koherr	Phil Baker & Drew Vaupen	October 17, 2010	123	3.85
Gabe is left in charge of Charlie while doing a school assignment with Jo. Meanwhile, Teddy and Emmett trick PJ into going to the dentist and Amy agrees to help Bob on an extermination, when he actually promised to take her on a spa getaway. Guest stars: Micah Williams as Emmett, G. Hannelius as Jo, Doug Haley as Walter, Sonya Eddy as Verna
19	19	"Sleepless in Denver"	Adam Weissman	Jim Gerkin	October 24, 2010	125	3.19
Gabe and his friends have a sleepover and when they stay up and watch a scary movie, they later have trouble sleeping. Meanwhile, Charlie refuses to sleep in her new bed, so she starts acting up on the day Teddy has an audition for a school play. PJ has dreams of what can happen if he becomes too fat, so he decides to eat healthy food. Guest stars: Hayley Holmes as Alice, Gregg Daniel as Mr. Billups, Nolan Gould as Zander, Mackenzie Hannigan as Jeremy, Najee Muhammad as Liam Note: Charlie speaks for the first time in this episode.
20	20	"Girl Bites Dog"	Eric Dean Seaton	Christopher Vane	November 14, 2010	117	3.87
Charlie bites Spencer because she suspects something is going on with him. Teddy is worried Charlie's biting will put their relationship in a crisis, but it is proved that Charlie's hunch is right when she meets Spencer with another girl, Skyler. When she confronts him about, Spencer tells her that Skyler is his cousin, but when Teddy apologises to Skyler, it is actually revealed that Spencer had been cheating on Teddy with Skyler. Teddy breaks up with Spencer and is heartbroken. Meanwhile, Gabe takes advantage of PJ by tricking him into signing a contract that says he has to drive Gabe wherever he wants to go. To get back at him, Amy pretends to be a ghost that haunts the car when Gabe sits in it. Guest stars: Raven Goodwin as Ivy, Shane Harper as Spencer, Samantha Boscarino as Skyler, Robert Keith Wyatt as Ralph
21	21	"Teddy's Broken Heart Club Band"	Adam Weissman	Michael Fitzpatrick	November 21, 2010	119	4.11
After Teddy's break-up with Spencer, she and Skyler meet up to make a song, dissing Spencer, to post online. Spencer tells Teddy that he regrets what he did and wants to start over. However, Teddy told Spencer that she cannot forgive him because she does not trust him but does apologize to him before he left. Meanwhile, Gabe and PJ are tired of sharing their room, so Gabe stays in Mrs. Dabney's house. Amy takes advantage of a gym which offers free daycare, so she can go to the spa, across the street. Guest stars: Patricia Belcher as Mrs. Dabney, Raven Goodwin as Ivy, Shane Harper as Spencer, Mary Scheer as Patricia, Samantha Boscarino as Skyler
22	22	"Teddy Rebounds" "Teddy vs. Spencer (UK)"	Eric Dean Seaton	Phil Baker & Drew Vaupen	November 28, 2010	120	3.70
A new kid on the block named Austin who Gabe is forced to become friends with develops a crush on Teddy. She uses the crush to her advantage to make Spencer jealous, who has already gotten a new girlfriend. Meanwhile, Bob temporarily fills in as a member of PJ and Emmett's band after Charlie gets their newest member, Jimmy, sick. Guest stars: Shane Harper as Spencer, Micah Williams as Emmett, Nathan Gamble as Austin, Ryan Heinke as Jimmy
23	23	"Pushing Buttons"	Adam Weissman	Phil Baker & Drew Vaupen	December 12, 2010	124	3.41
Gabe accuses Charlie of leaving the garage door open and allowing his bike to be stolen when it is really just a scheme to get his father to buy him a new bike. Teddy films a play for her drama class (a special day in their life) and she picks the day she finds out that Amy was pregnant with Charlie, but she accidentally reveals to Amy how she really felt when she heard that a new baby was on the way. Meanwhile, Emmett gets a new girlfriend, Nina, from South America, and it seems she is crushing on PJ. Guest stars: Micah Williams as Emmett, Doug Haley as Walter, Tucker Albrizzi as Jake, Carmen Moreno as Nina / Tina, Danielle Morrow as Kimmy
24	24	"Snow Show" (Part 1)	Shelley Jensen	Erika Kaestle & Patrick McCarthy	January 16, 2011	121	7.24
The Duncans go on a family road trip to a ski resort in the mountains. Teddy gets a reading from a psychic that she will meet the love of her life. Gabe abuses room service to get back at a bellhop who actually was his third-grade teacher; PJ meets two sisters who take care of him after going on the wrong snowboarding trail. Bob and Amy find out they are not actually married because the judge who married them was a con artist. Guest stars: Shane Harper as Spencer, Steve Hytner as Marvin Starkwell, Jordan Nichols as Brandon, Chris Warren Jr. as Justin, Meagen Fay as Claire, Gabriel Tigerman as Will, Brittany Ross as Katie, Katelyn Pacitto as Sarah, Jordan Lund as Jeremiah Note: "Snow Show: Part 1" became the most watched episode of Good Luck Charlie thus far, earning 7.24 million viewers, until the airing of the season 3 special, "Special Delivery". These high ratings came with the Hannah Montana Forever series finale "Wherever I Go" and the season 3 The Suite Life on Deck episode, "Twister: Part 3" serving the show's lead-ins.
25	25	"Snow Show" (Part 2)	Joel Zwick	Christopher Vane	January 23, 2011	122	4.26
Gabe has to pay off the room service and PJ owes some money to a kid named Walker, whom he met on the ski lift, so they enter an ice skating contest. Teddy does not know which of the three men she meets to pick, so asks Ivy to meet her at the lodge to help her decide. Spencer tries to win Teddy back, which results in him kissing Teddy on the ski lift. Amy and Bob struggle after Bob does not want to get married again while on vacation. Teddy tells Spencer she wants to just be friends, after Amy and Bob renew their vows. Guest stars: Raven Goodwin as Ivy, Shane Harper as Spencer, Jordan Nichols as Brandon, Chris Warren Jr. as Justin, Dee Dee Rescher as Shirley, Ron West as Peter, Davis Cleveland as Walker
26	26	"Driving Mrs. Dabney"	Bob Koherr	Dan Staley	January 30, 2011	126	3.75
After Bob tells Teddy that she is not ready to take her driving test, Teddy offers to drive Mrs. Dabney around town. She accepts her offer; they drive around town, helping Mrs. Dabney to complete her errands. At last, Teddy drives Mrs. Dabney to see her sister at the mountains. Eventually, they run out of gas and become stranded. Meanwhile, the Duncans are preparing for Teddy's 16th birthday; PJ and Gabe have a hard time looking for a present for Teddy. Meanwhile, Amy falls in love with a dog that followed Gabe home. In the end, Bob says that he did not want Teddy to drive because he is afraid she will leave and never come back after learning how to drive. Teddy and Bob share a moment and later reconcile. PJ and Gabe make up for not giving her a present by making a rap for her. The episode ends with Teddy earning her license; she is happy because she has the freedom to drive wherever she wants, but to her dismay, the entire family makes her go out to run errands. Guest stars: Patricia Belcher as Mrs. Dabney, Jennifer Hasty as Dolly, Dana Powell as Nancy

=== Season 2 (2011) ===
No. overall	No. in season	Title	Directed by	Written by	Original release date	Prod. code	U.S. viewers (millions)
27	1	"Charlie is 2"	Bob Koherr	Erika Kaestle & Patrick McCarthy	February 20, 2011	202	4.24
It is Charlie's second birthday; the family wants to give her an extraordinary gift. Bob's idea of a gift is giving Charlie a pony ride. Things go haywire when he rents a pony and is unaware that it is stolen; Amy tries to bribe the police, but, instead, they both end up in jail. Charlie's love for The Gurgles, a popular children's TV show, gives Teddy the idea to buy tickets to their next concert, but to their dismay, the concert sells out before they can obtain tickets. Furthermore, they try to win tickets by entering a video contest which they lose. They seek help from a Gurgle, but he refuses to give them tickets. Teddy, Charlie and Gabe sneak in but end up getting caught and thrown in jail. Elsewhere, PJ tries to sell one of his songs to one of the Gurgles. As a result, he also goes to jail. Surprisingly, one of the Gurgles sings one of PJ's songs to the other Gurgles. He sells the song and uses the money to bail the Duncans out of jail. Guest stars: Christopher Darga as Stan, Suzanne Krull as Joyce, Bari K. Willerford as Policeman, Regi Davis as Security Guard, Brendan Patrick Connor as Security Guard #3
28	2	"Something's Fishy"	Bob Koherr	Christopher Vane	February 27, 2011	203	3.43
Bob confiscates Teddy's cell phone when she exceeds her texting limit. Bob demands that she must pay the bill; Teddy is forced to get a job at Otto's Grotto, dressed as an octopus. Her job is a complete nightmare when it comes to dealing with children who are out of control. Meanwhile, PJ uses Charlie as a girl magnet, but his plan backfires when his new girlfriend, Kayla, only seems to be interested in Charlie rather than PJ. Elsewhere, Amy is obsessed with trying to beat Gabe at video game tennis. Guest stars: Jack Plotnick as Otto, Skyler Day as Kayla, Raymond Ochoa as Augie
29	3	"Let's Potty"	Bob Koherr	Phil Baker & Drew Vaupen	March 6, 2011	201	4.06
Bob and Amy are concerned that Charlie is not potty-trained yet because that means that Charlie will not be able to be enrolled into a prestigious preschool. Meanwhile, Charlie flushes her toys down the toilet, and Bob tries to fix the plumbing. Bob accidentally cracks a pipe and water sprays him and the fuse box, resulting in an electrical outage. Furthermore, to complete their video game, PJ and Gabe run a cable from Mrs. Dabney's fuse box to power their room, eventually giving her house an electrical outage as well. Meanwhile, Teddy helps Ivy prepare for her first online chat with Raymond, her crush. Guest stars: Patricia Belcher as Mrs. Dabney, Raven Goodwin as Ivy, Daniel Curtis Lee as Raymond, Mary Passeri as Sondra
30	4	"Appy Days"	Bob Koherr	Drew Vaupen & Phil Baker	March 13, 2011	208	3.05
Teddy uses a fake phone call app to trick Amy and Ivy's mother, Mary Lou, into allowing them to go to a senior party. Their plan backfires when Amy and Mary Lou find out from Gabe and set out to track the girls down. Meanwhile, PJ has to fill in for Bob at his job when he gets bitten by a spider and has an allergic reaction. PJ learns from Bob's coworker that Bob often talks about his children: Teddy is smart and popular, Gabe is sharp as a tack, Charlie is a cutie, and PJ is just nice; this makes PJ feel hurt. Because of Bob taking a rest due to the allergic reaction, Gabe has to take care of Charlie, who stalks him to make him play baby with her. Guest stars: Raven Goodwin as Ivy, Ellia English as Mary Lou, Frank Collison as Vern
31	5	"Duncan vs. Duncan"	Tommy Thompson	Dan Staley	March 20, 2011	204	3.34
Bob does an excellent bed bug extermination job at a luxurious hotel that they let him and Amy stay in their most romantic suite for one night for free. When Amy has a confrontation at the supermarket and Bob does not defend her, Amy and Bob vow not speak to each other. Meanwhile, Teddy and PJ plan to have a party, but when they find out that Amy and Bob are still not speaking with each other, instead of having of fun, wild party, they have a silent party. When they apologize to each other, Bob and Amy eventually realize Teddy and PJ are having a party, and they are punished by Amy and Bob embarrassing them. Plus, Amy forces Gabe to take cotillion classes with Jo. Guest stars: G Hannelius as Jo, Micah Williams as Emmett, Lee Garlington as Mrs. Krump, Lane Davies as Mr. Krump
32	6	"L.A.R.P. in the Park"	Bob Koherr	Ellen Byron & Lissa Kapstrom	March 27, 2011	206	3.69
Teddy falls for a guy named Evan, who she finds is interested in Pokeo, (a spoof of Pokémon and Yu-Gi-Oh!), a fantasy card game for boys like Gabe. Teddy pretends to be interested in Pokeo to impress Evan. He then makes her play a game of L.A.R.P. out in public with him and his friends, which turns out to be another one of his hobbies. Meanwhile, Charlie pokes Amy in the eye and she pretends to be hurt to stay in the hospital longer so she does not have to take care of the children. Meanwhile, Bob forgets to thank Amy in a speech after winning the exterminator of the year award so PJ and him try to remake the video at home so he can thank her. Guest stars: Matt Prokop as Evan, Tim Russ as Dr. Meyers, Calum Worthy as Lewis
33	7	"Battle of the Bands"	Bob Koherr	Tom Anderson	April 3, 2011	209	2.78
Teddy and Skyler compete against PJ, Spencer and Emmett in the annual battle of the bands competition at the mall. Teddy then finds out that Skyler and PJ are dating and neither of them want to do the competition any more. Meanwhile, Bob asks Gabe to take a gift back to a rich boy in his class. When Bob goes to the boy's house to return Gabe's gift, he goes back on his word and befriends the boy's father. Also, Amy takes credit for a painting done by Charlie after her art teacher says she has no real talent and that Charlie's painting is a work of art. Guest stars: Micah Williams as Emmett, Shane Harper as Spencer, Samantha Boscarino as Skyler, Don McManus as Bruce, Mo Gaffney as Val, Kel Mitchell as M.C., Matthew Glen Johnson as Lucas Note: The song Spencer performs at Battle of the Bands is an actual song by Shane Harper called "One Step Closer".
34	8	"The Singin' Dancin' Duncans"	Bob Koherr	Jim Gerkin	April 10, 2011	205	3.46
Amy persuades the family to take part in a benefit for her hospital so she can beat her long-time arch-rival, Fran Culpepper. When they prove uncooperative in the rhythmic dancing, Amy hires professional dancers to replace the members of the family except for Charlie. Meanwhile, Teddy's classmate Lynette does not invite her to her party but she invites Ivy. Later, she finds out that Ivy has been making up excuses to go somewhere else and Teddy suspects that Ivy attended the party without her. Also, Gabe and PJ sell "old junk" on the Internet to raise money. Guest stars: Raven Goodwin as Ivy, Shane Harper as Spencer, Daniel Curtis Lee as Raymond, Doug Haley as Walter, Phil Abrams as Mr. Piper, Devika Parikh as Fran Culpepper, Tabitha Morella as Lynette, Cameron Boyce as Fake Gabe, Kim Valentine as Fake Amy
35	9	"Teddy's Bear"	Bob Koherr	Christopher Vane	April 15, 2011	210	3.56
Teddy's teacher, Mr. Piper, marks her test wrong due to a technicality and refuses to correct it, and Teddy winds up getting detention by snapping the point on his pencil out of frustration. Things get even worse when Amy ("Mama Bear") takes matters into her own hands. Meanwhile, Bob takes Charlie to a ballet class and winds up participating and Gabe helps PJ prepare to tell Skyler's old boyfriend Brock (who happens to be captain of the wrestling team) to stop texting her. Guest stars: Samantha Boscarino as Skyler, Phil Abrams as Mr. Piper, Valorie Hubbard as Miss Donna, Vernee Watson as Principal Hibbert, Derek Alvarado as Matt, Bridger Zadina as Brock Note: This episode was originally scheduled to premiere on Sunday, April 17, but was moved up to a special timeslot, Friday, April 15 at 7:30/6:30c, preceding the premiere of the Disney Channel Original Movie Lemonade Mouth, starring Bridgit Mendler.
36	10	"Meet the Parents"	Bob Koherr	Erika Kaestle & Patrick McCarthy	May 1, 2011	211	3.20
Teddy and PJ pose as Gabe's parents as they attend a conference with his elderly teacher, Mrs. Monroe. Everything goes well until Mrs. Monroe spots Teddy on a date with her latest crush, Derek. Mrs. Monroe thinks that Teddy is "cheating" on her husband. Meanwhile, PJ and Skyler go on their first official date; Bob bets that Amy cannot build Charlie's new playhouse without his help. Guest stars: Samantha Boscarino as Skyler, Reid Ewing as Derek, K Callan as Mrs. Monroe, Michael Naughton as Morris, Robert Wu as Tim
37	11	"Gabe's 12 1/2 Birthday"	Bob Koherr	Jim Gerkin	May 8, 2011	212	N/A
Amy and Bob make up for not throwing Gabe his much delayed 12th birthday party by giving him a 12 1/2 birthday party, after Gabe promised to be good for a whole week. Gabe's party falls on the same day as a huge blizzard, so they throw him a party at home. Meanwhile, Ivy and Teddy cannot get along with Ivy not liking Teddy's new boyfriend Derek, which causes a rift in their friendship. They go to each other's houses to settle their differences, the same day as the snow storm. Teddy is driven crazy by Ivy's parents Mary Lou and Harry while Ivy is having a great time celebrating Gabe's 12 1/2 birthday. Meanwhile, PJ helps Bob lose a few pounds. Guest stars: Raven Goodwin as Ivy, Ellia English as Mary Lou, Reid Ewing as Derek, William Allen Young as Harry (uncredited)
38	12	"The Break Up"	Bob Koherr	Phil Baker & Drew Vaupen	May 15, 2011	213	N/A
Teddy decides to break up with Derek, but has a hard time doing so, due to him continually doing nice things for her. Meanwhile, Amy becomes Gabe's new hockey coach and hurts herself during a practice. PJ finds out that he is being paid less than minimum wage and gets advice from Bob about what he should do, until PJ gets fired for going on strike with the other Kwikki Chikki staff. Guest stars: Raven Goodwin as Ivy, Reid Ewing as Derek, David Arnott as Mitch, Chris Wylde as Corporal Kwikki, Martin Spanjers as Justin, Joe Gieb as Joe Note: Teddy in this episode said to Ivy that she has never broken up with someone before, but she was the one who broke up with Spencer in Girl Bites Dogs.
39	13	"Charlie Shakes it Up"	Joel Zwick	Christopher Vane	June 5, 2011	215	4.02
Teddy, Amy and Charlie plan a trip to Chicago to visit their rich great-aunt Nell, where they are instead mistaken for the Duncan Sisters, a famous hip-hop dance duo and are taken to the dance studio of "Shake It Up, Chicago". Amy pretends that she, Teddy and Charlie are sisters in order to accomplish her dreams of being on TV, but since they do not know how to dance, they enlist the help of dancers CeCe Jones and Rocky Blue. Back at home, Gabe and PJ hold a yard sale in hopes of raising money while cleaning out the attic, but wind up selling a cat cookie jar with $500 in it to Mrs. Dabney; Bob is obsessed with a TV show, Higgins and Zork, which he later discovers Mrs. Dabney also loves. Special guest stars: Bella Thorne as CeCe Jones, Zendaya as Rocky Blue, Davis Cleveland as Flynn Jones, Adam Irigoyen as Deuce Martinez Guest stars: Patricia Belcher as Mrs. Dabney, R. Brandon Johnson as Gary Wilde Note: This episode is a crossover with Shake It Up. Davis Cleveland makes his second appearance in the series; he previously guest starred as Walker in the episode "Snow Show: Part 2". This is the second episode to not feature Teddy posting a video diary.
40	14	"Baby's New Shoes"	Bob Koherr	Ellen Byron & Lissa Kapstrom	June 12, 2011	207	3.12
Teddy uses Gabe and his friend Jake to go see a PG-13-rated movie so she can use it to win an internship at a news station. Meanwhile, Amy buys a pair of heels that cost $400 to go out to a party with and plans on returning them. She puts them away in until Charlie gets a hold of them and ruins the shoes. PJ tries to make amends with a kindergarten classmate after cutting the boy's ponytail. Guest stars: Graham Patrick Martin as Dustin, Jared Kusnitz as Grant, Tucker Albrizzi as Jake, Patricia Forte as Lydia, Carla Jeffery as Jean, Brennan Murray as Richard Note: This episode was aired out of production order; Teddy states Gabe's age as 11, because this episode was produced before "Gabe's 12 1/2 Birthday".
41	15	"Bye Bye Video Diary"	Phill Lewis	Erika Kaestle & Patrick McCarthy	June 19, 2011	216	4.13
While Teddy washes the dishes, Charlie puts a laptop inside the dishwasher. Amy finds it inside the washer, thinking it is Teddy's and all of the video diaries have been deleted, leaving Teddy very upset and considers giving up on making them. Amy encourages her not to give up, so she and Teddy stay up all night recreating the video diaries. However, when PJ arrives back from Kwikki Chikki college the next morning, he tells Teddy that he accidentally took her laptop, meaning that PJ's laptop was in the dishwasher and the original video diaries are fine. Meanwhile, because PJ has been going to college, Gabe takes over his place. But when he watches a horror movie, he is terrified and refuses to let Charlie sleep in her own room. Guest stars: Andrew Caldwell as Gravy, Christopher Carroll as Professor Giblet, David H. Lawrence XVII as Fred
42	16	"Monkey Business"	Bob Koherr	Dan Staley	June 26, 2011	214	3.00
When Gabe wants to go to Super Adventure land and Bob tells Gabe that it is too expensive, Gabe tricks him with a fake winning lottery ticket so Bob will spend the money anyway. But the trick goes too far when Amy quits her job because of the family's false wealth. After finding out that the ticket was fake, Amy tries to get her job back, but her unfair boss Karen refuses to rehire her. Gabe then comes up with the idea to give Karen a fake lottery ticket, causing her to quit her own job and allowing Amy to replace her much higher position. Meanwhile, Teddy babysits new neighbor Debbie Dooley's daughter, Deedee, and while making a stuffed monkey at Make a Monkey (parody of Build-A-Bear), for Charlie, she later loses an expensive earring. Teddy and Ivy assume it fell off Teddy's earlobe and into the monkey. They take Charlie's stuffed monkey and destroy it to find the earring, but it is not there. Anxious, Teddy continues to worry over getting in trouble and starts having a panic attack. In an attempt to calm her down, Ivy guesses the earring is in the other monkey, the one Teddy made for the neighbor's daughter, so Teddy goes over to the neighbor's house, gets the monkey, then rips it apart, unaware that she is being video taped. Also, Skyler's father Nick starts spying on PJ to find out if he is the right guy for her but it takes PJ to the edge. Guest stars: Raven Goodwin as Ivy, Samantha Boscarino as Skyler, Lee Arenberg as Nick, Brooke Dillman as Karen, Ericka Kreutz as Debbie Dooley
43	17	"PJ in the City"	Bob Koherr	Drew Vaupen & Phil Baker	July 10, 2011	219	3.51
Skyler moves to New York City and does not tell PJ to spare his feelings. PJ then follows her to New York, but Bob goes after him. Meanwhile, Teddy is determined to take the perfect school picture, but things do not go as planned. In order to earn money for her outfit, she gets a job at a beach store where Spencer is working. Meanwhile, Amy barges in on Gabe's love life; she overhears him talking about having a crush on a girl in his class named Heather and invites her over. After Heather gets there, Gabe is furious with Amy because she invited the wrong Heather, causing Amy to realize that there is more than one Heather in his class. Gabe then reveals that there are actually five Heathers in his class: Hot Heather, Annoying Heather, Smart Heather, Tall Heather, and Hairy Heather. Since Annoying Heather now thinks Gabe has feelings for her, they both try to find a way to get her to leave. Guest stars: Shane Harper as Spencer, Samantha Boscarino as Skyler, Kathryn Fiore as Rain, Kelly Gould as Heather
44	18	"Sun Show" (Part 1)	Bob Koherr	Christopher Vane	July 24, 2011	221	4.93
The Duncan family goes on a trip to Hawaii in celebration of Bob and Amy's 20th wedding anniversary. After wandering onto sacred ground, Amy gets the entire family cursed, but refuses to believe it, until she is trapped in an elevator with a claustrophobic woman. Soon after, Teddy gets knocked out during her surfing lesson; PJ and Gabe's aerial tour pilot falls unconscious during the flight; Bob gets knocked out with a golf ball; and Charlie goes missing. Meanwhile, Bob faces continuous hour-long timeshare seminars. Guest stars: Booboo Stewart as Kai, Christopher Duva as Wallace, Alberto Isaac as Mano, Julie Brister as Rhonda, E.J. Callahan as Hal Note: Later on, both episodes were combined and aired as a full hour long special.
45	19	"Sun Show" (Part 2)	Bob Koherr	Erika Kaestle & Patrick McCarthy	July 31, 2011	222	4.14
Still thinking that they are cursed, Amy encounters plumeria numerous times and gets severe allergic reactions. Teddy finally finds Charlie seeing her playing with a group of other children. Bob asks Teddy to pretend to be Amy for the time-share seminar. After making a promise to God during his and PJ's near-death experience on an aerial tour, Gabe coaches PJ to face his fears. Guest stars: Booboo Stewart as Kai, Christopher Duva as Wallace, Alberto Isaac as Mano, Kalia Fullerton as Leilani Note: This episode premiered on the show's website on DisneyChannel.com, after "Sun Show: Part 1" premiered on July 24, 2011.
46	20	"Amazing Gracie"	Bob Koherr	Jim Gerkin	August 7, 2011	217	3.76
Teddy gets a used car when Mary Lou Wentz wants Harry Wentz to sell his car, that he calls Gracie, because it takes up too much space in the garage. Teddy buys the car and on the way home, she accidentally totals it. Meanwhile, Amy is offended and upset that Charlie will not make a scene while getting dropped off at preschool, which leads to "Mommy & Charlie Day" which is a day where Amy bonds with Charlie, hoping she will cry when she drops her off at preschool the next day. The next day, Charlie gives Amy a heartwarming hug. Elsewhere, PJ and Gabe try finding Bob a friend to avoid going on their annual father and son fishing trip. Guest stars: Raven Goodwin as Ivy, Ellia English as Mary Lou, Bob Bledsoe as Mark, Andrew Bilgore as Roger, William Allen Young as Harry (uncredited)
47	21	"Termite Queen"	Bob Koherr	Dan Staley	August 21, 2011	220	3.43
Teddy goes with Bob to the exterminator convention in hopes of making him happy enough to buy her a car. Meanwhile, Gabe and Jake shoot a monster movie starring Charlie. Plus, PJ's friend from Kwikki Chikki University, Gravy, is allowed to stay in the Duncans' household. Gravy drives Amy crazy with his abnormal living habits. Guest stars: Tucker Albrizzi as Jake, Andrew Caldwell as Gravy, Carlos Lacámara as Murray
48	22	"The Bob Duncan Experience"	Bob Koherr	Samantha Silver	August 28, 2011	218	3.13
After accidentally breaking the one and only record made by Bob's old band, PJ gets the Bob Duncan Experience back together. PJ also learns the real reason why the band broke up: the drummer Richie tells PJ that when Bob started dating Amy, she had tried to weasel into the band, driving him and former member Marty crazy. Meanwhile, Emmett proves to Teddy that she had promised to be his date to the Homecoming Dance in elementary school, so Teddy tries to hook him up with Alicia, the new girl in school. Gabe and his friend Leo make a lemonade stand, but split up and compete for business after a falling-out over the profits. Special guest star: Rico Rodriguez as Leo Guest stars: Micah Williams as Emmett, Stephen Kearin as Richie, Kiersey Clemons as Alicia
49	23	"Ditch Day"	Phill Lewis	Christopher Vane	September 11, 2011	225	3.19
When Teddy finds out she has a reputation as a goody goody, she ditches school with Ivy to earn a bad reputation. Teddy is nervous because she has never ditched before. Meanwhile, PJ tries to make a dress for Charlie for a Home EC class. Also, Gabe tries to get himself ungrounded by bringing an old love poem from Amy's high school days back to light, which he thought had been written by his father. It turns out it was actually written by Bob Diddlebock. Amy has kept it for years because it is the only love poem she ever received. In the end, Bob writes her a love poem as well and they reconcile. Guest stars: Raven Goodwin as Ivy, Rick Hall as Sheriff, Steve Bean as Mayor, Portia as Mrs. Cobb, B.K. Cannon as Lana
50	24	"Alley Oops"	Tommy Thompson	Jim Gerkin	September 25, 2011	223	2.98
Mary Lou Wentz wins an audition to sing the national anthem at a Denver Nuggets basketball game, but Teddy is forced to lip sync for Mrs. Wentz when she gets stage fright at the last minute. Meanwhile, Amy joins a social networking site and is upset when her children will not accept her friend requests. Also Bob is trying to win a bowling tournament but Gabe's hand gets stuck in a toy claw machine and they use Charlie to win. Guest stars: Raven Goodwin as Ivy, Ellia English as Mary Lou, Paul Rae as Mike
51	25	"Scary Had a Little Lamb"	Shannon Flynn	Phil Baker & Drew Vaupen	October 9, 2011	224	4.45
It is Halloween and when Charlie gets scared by Karl, a jerk, Teddy decides to give him a taste of his own medicine with Ivy's help. Meanwhile, Gabe agrees to protect Mrs. Dabney's house from teenagers, but when her house gets trashed, Gabe has to do what ever she says. Also, PJ becomes a Goth because of his new girlfriend, Zoey. Bob and Amy dress as each other for Halloween. Guest stars: Raven Goodwin as Ivy, Patricia Belcher as Mrs. Dabney, Brendan Robinson as Karl, Bridgette Davidovici as Zoey, David Lewis as Liam
52	26	"Return to Super Adventure Land"	Bob Koherr	Erika Kaestle & Patrick McCarthy	October 23, 2011	227	3.33
When the Duncans take a family trip to Super Adventure Land, Gabe and Amy get offered a job to be in a commercial; when they receive the script, Amy is upset that Gabe gets most of the lines and she only gets one, so Amy makes a few tweaks to the script. Meanwhile, Emmett gives Teddy a job at Super Adventure Land so she could save up for a new car. Teddy soon discovers that the job Emmett got her is to portray the princess in, The Princess & The Frog and Emmett is the frog. Also, Bob has noticed that PJ has a knack for cooking. He would do anything to keep him making his delicious food. Guest stars: Micah Williams as Emmett, Shane Harper as Spencer, Brian Palermo as Danny Flufferman
53	27	"Can You Keep a Secret?"	Bob Koherr	Phil Baker & Drew Vaupen	November 6, 2011	230	4.56
Since Emmett quit his job as the frog at Super Adventure Land, Spencer has replaced him. Teddy becomes nervous when she has to kiss him. When they kiss, Teddy's feelings for Spencer start to come back. In a moment of anxiety and nervousness, she runs off after the kiss. Later, Spencer comes to ask her if she is okay, and Teddy expresses that her feelings for Spencer have come back. They kiss again and get back together. She is afraid of telling Amy and Bob this, since they bought her a new car. But she tells them that she is really happy with Spencer now, so they agree, also making her pay for the car. Meanwhile, PJ learns that Bob accidentally wrote his name incorrectly on his birth certificate. Instead of saying "Patty John Duncan", (PJ for short) it says "Potty John". Elsewhere, Gabe says that he is trying to get money for a z-cub 6, new game system, but gets PJ a new guitar for his birthday. Guest stars: Micah Williams as Emmett, Shane Harper as Spencer, Taylor Cosgrove Scofield as Elliot
54	28	"Story Time"	Phill Lewis	Aaron Ho	November 13, 2011	226	3.08
When Teddy and Amy take Charlie to the library for story time, the host and also worker in children's publishing, Candace, tells Teddy and Amy that books nowadays are boring; she is always on the look for new talent. This leads to Teddy and Amy competing to write a children's story to get published. Meanwhile, PJ gives great advice to a newlywed couple while delivering chicken and Bob does career day at Gabe's class. Guest stars: Sonya Leslie as Candace, Adam Chambers as Scott, Lynsey Bartilson as Christine, Carol Kiernan as Elaine
55	29	"It's a Charlie Duncan Thanksgiving"	Bob Koherr	Jim Gerkin	November 20, 2011	228	4.12
Frank, Bob's mean father, comes over for Thanksgiving and begins a romance with the newly divorced Mrs. Dabney, much to Bob and Gabe's dismay. Meanwhile, since PJ has a passion for cooking, he tries to trick Amy about cooking the turkey, but a mishap lands Teddy in the hospital. Elsewhere, Teddy and Ivy attempt to wait in line at an electronics store to get a MyTab (a spoof of the iPad), which are on sale. Guest stars: Raven Goodwin as Ivy, Patricia Belcher as Mrs. Dabney, Alan Rachins as Frank, Brendan Robinson as Karl
56	30	"Teddy on Ice"	Bob Koherr	Dan Staley	November 27, 2011	229	3.95
Ivy invites Teddy for a weekend at the lake house. Ivy tricks her by saying it is a nice house by the lake, but to Teddy's dismay, it is a small shack literally on the lake. Meanwhile, Charlie said a bad word at school and Amy and Bob try to figure out who is the culprit. Elsewhere, after PJ and Gabe break Mrs. Dabney's satellite dish, she comes over to the Duncan house to watch her soap opera, The Tears of Tomorrow, in which PJ and Gabe become captivated by the storylines. In the end, it is revealed that Amy is the guilty one; Charlie has been copying what she has been saying. Guest stars: Raven Goodwin as Ivy, Patricia Belcher as Mrs. Dabney, Ellia English as Mary Lou, William Allen Young as Harry (uncredited)

=== Film (2011) ===
Title	Directed by	Written by	Original air date	U.S. viewers (millions)
Good Luck Charlie, It's Christmas!	Arlene Sanford	Geoff Rodkey	December 2, 2011	6.88
Guest stars: Debra Monk as Petunia, Michael Kagan as Hank, Raven Goodwin as Ivy, E. E. Bell as Lenny, Ernie Grunwald as Walter, David Wells as Stan, Pamela Dunlap as Sue, Joey Nader as Daryl, Floyd Westover as Santa, Logan Ward as Cowboy Friend, Abbie Cobb as Jordan, Karen Peterson as Restaurant Patron, Amy Savannah as Customer, Ryan Johnson as Shopper/Audience Member, Sean Bott as Nerdy Player

=== Season 3 (2012–13) ===
On August 29, 2011, Disney Channel renewed Good Luck Charlie for a third season. The third season featured a new addition to the Duncan family. Fans had been given the chance to vote for the name online. On January 30, 2012, Bridgit Mendler tweeted that season three had begun filming. The season premiered on May 6, 2012, with two back-to-back episodes. Both Leigh-Allyn Baker and Eric Allan Kramer each directed an episode this season. The first Christmas episode of the series also aired this season.

No. overall	No. in season	Title	Directed by	Written by	Original release date	Prod. code	U.S. viewers (millions)
57	1	"Make Room for Baby"	Bob Koherr	Phil Baker & Drew Vaupen	May 6, 2012	301	3.96
With the fifth and final Duncan child on its way, Amy demands that they need a larger house in order to have more room and not be so crowded. The entire family does not like the idea, especially Bob. Meanwhile, Teddy and Spencer audition to have the opportunity to work in an indoor show at Super Adventure land, so they audition for the George and Martha Washington show. Only Spencer got the job, and it was said to be really hot the next week, and Martha Washington is Sandy Super, the cute, smart niece of S.A.L.'s founder who has a crush on Spencer and always thinking Teddy does not exist. Since Gabe is finally leaving, he and Mrs. Dabney pull ultimate pranks on each other to see who gets the last laugh. In the end when the family is almost done packing, Amy goes back inside because she thought she had forgot something. When she goes inside, she remembers all of the memories that her and the family had at the house. Then she tells Bob that she wants the family to stay at the house. Guest stars: Shane Harper as Spencer, Patricia Belcher as Mrs. Dabney, Madalyn Horcher as Sandy Note: Starting this episode, the opening credits of the season feature the second season cast photo at the end of the theme. The fifth (and final) Duncan child was not born until the one-hour episode "Special Delivery". The final scene in the opening credits was updated in "Welcome Home".
58	2	"Bad Luck Teddy"	Bob Koherr	Christopher Vane	May 6, 2012	302	4.26
Ever since Teddy and Spencer got back together, the basketball team has not been able to win a game. This leads to everybody thinking that Teddy is a jinx. So they fake breakup, which will help the team relax, thinking the curse has been lifted, they will win and then get back together. Meanwhile, overhearing that Amy and Bob were talking about how the son of Amy's friend was going to send him to military school, but Gabe thinks they were talking about him so he starts acting on his best behavior. When Amy and Bob found out they continue to let him believe he is being sent to military school. Meanwhile, PJ frequently attends his local barbershop to spend time with Syd, an attractive female barber. Guest stars: Raven Goodwin as Ivy, Shane Harper as Spencer, Troy Evans as Jerry, Rachel Melvin as Syd
59	3	"Amy Needs a Shower"	Bob Koherr	Erika Kaestle & Patrick McCarthy	May 13, 2012	303	3.00
Amy convinces Mary Lou Wentz to throw her a baby shower, but the shower takes an unexpected twist when Charlie blurts out all the rude things Amy said about her guests and causes them to leave. Meanwhile, Teddy and Ivy must complete their community service school or they do not get to graduate. Furthermore, PJ and Gabe compete to go to a hockey game with Bob. Guest stars: Raven Goodwin as Ivy, Ellia English as Mary Lou, Brooke Dillman as Karen, Ericka Kreutz as Debbie Dooley, Rolonda Watts as Diane, Mitchell Edmonds as Mike
60	4	"Dress Mess"	Bob Koherr	Jim Gerkin	May 13, 2012	304	3.61
Since Teddy is going to her prom with Spencer, Amy takes out her old prom dress and loans it to Teddy so she can wear it too, since Amy was never able to go to her prom. Teddy thinks the dress is outdated, but she does not say anything to spare Amy's feelings. On the night of her prom, she leaves with Amy's dress but immediately changes at school. Meanwhile, PJ needs a date for his prom, so when the pizza delivery girl, Taylor, shows up he becomes attracted to her and they go on a date. Taylor asks him to her prom, PJ accepts. She is homeschooled and the prom is in her basement. After going to the doctor and getting an ultrasound, Amy does not want to know the gender of the baby until it is actually born. On the other hand, Bob is anxious to know, so he asks Gabe to help him get the ultrasound of the baby. Gabe accidentally grabs the wrong ultrasound. Instead of taking Amy's ultrasound, he grabs the one for an Angela Duncan, who is having triplets. In the end, Bob's mother wants to know the gender of the baby; the doctor is about to reveal it, but is cut off as the episode ends. Guest stars: Shane Harper as Spencer, Michelle DeFraites as Taylor, Henry Dittman as Dr. Karp, Tangelia Rouse as Marcia, Julie Wittner as Kathy, Lynne Marie Stewart as Grandma
61	5	"Catch Me if You Can"	Bob Koherr	Christopher Vane	May 20, 2012	307	2.55
Teddy and Spencer have been secretly rehearsing a musical, "Franny Saves the Farm!", where Teddy has been cast as the lead role. Amy overhears Teddy and Spencer talking about through the baby monitor and follows them; Amy is shocked when she blows their cover. Teddy did not want to tell her because Amy hogs the spotlight. In the end, Amy fills in for one of the cast members due to him breaking his leg. Meanwhile, Bob desperately wants to catch an anaconda to prove to Gabe that he is cool. Plus, he also to one-up Quint, an animal control rival. Meanwhile, Mitch, PJ's boss, asks him to investigate who has been stealing chicken from Kwikki Chikki. The thief is eventually revealed to be Mitch who was planning to open his own poultry discount hut. Guest stars: Shane Harper as Spencer, David Arnott as Mitch, Martin Spanjers as Justin, Allan Havey as Quint, Kody Batchelor as Big Lenny, Angela Malhotra as Val, Rudy Martinez as Franklin
62	6	"Name That Baby"	Phill Lewis	Erika Kaestle & Patrick McCarthy	June 15, 2012	308	3.60
Amy and Bob vote on baby names for the fifth and final Duncan child. Meanwhile, Teddy is eager to find a quiet place to study because she has her final exam the next day. PJ must fulfill one last gym requirement in order to graduate from high school. Furthermore, Amy and Bob overhear Gabe telling Charlie that they will forget about her once the new baby is born. Amy and Bob make up for all of the lost time that they did not spend with Gabe. Guest stars: Raven Goodwin as Ivy, Micah Stephen Williams as Emmett, Ellia English as Mary Lou, Sean O'Bryan as Mr. Hammerstone Note: The episode was originally scheduled to premiere on June 3, 2012, along with a new Shake It Up episode, but was moved down to a special timeslot, Friday, June 15, at 7:30/6:30c, preceding the premiere of the Disney Channel Original Movie Let It Shine. This is the second episode of the series to premiere on a Friday night after "Teddy's Bear". In the United Kingdom, this episode had 275,000 viewers when it premiered on October 5, 2012.
63	7	"Special Delivery"	Bob Koherr	Dan Staley & Drew Vaupen & Phil Baker	June 24, 2012	305–306	7.48
The fifth Duncan member is one week overdue and Amy is in a bad mood and constantly rude to the family. Teddy tries to helping her by inducing labor, but Amy does not want to have the baby on Charlie's birthday because she fears the family will forget her. Meanwhile, Bob and PJ go out looking for a new car. After choosing their ideal car, the Serenade, they take it home, but to their luck, it does not fit inside the garage. Gabe is sent to buy Charlie a doll for her birthday, instead he ends up buying a video game, "Attack of the Zartians". Amy goes into labor on the day of Charlie's birthday and Teddy discovers that Amy forgot to mail the invitations to her birthday party, so she tells Gabe and PJ to throw her a birthday party; Gabe and PJ dress up as princesses in order to entertain her. As they rush to the hospital, Teddy's car runs out of gas. They hitchhike on an ice-cream truck to the hospital. As they are on their way to the hospital, Amy gives birth to their baby boy, Toby Duncan. Guest stars: Tucker Albrizzi as Jake, Cooper Barnes as Stu, Melissa Tang as Liza, Jill Alexander as Rachel, Jay Brian Winnick as Mustachio Pete, Matt Lusk as Paul Notes: The name Toby Duncan received almost 26 million votes worldwide. This is a one-hour special. This episode marks the final showing of the second season cast photo at the end of the opening credits. Starting in the next episode, the third season cast photo displays for the remainder of the season. This episode surpassed "Snow Show: Part 1" to become the most watched episode of the series, earning 7.48 million viewers. In the United Kingdom, this episode had 602,000 viewers when it premiered on October 12, 2012, making it the second most watched broadcast on Disney Channel. In Australia, 47,000 viewers watched the premiere on October 5, 2012.
64	8	"Welcome Home"	Phill Lewis	Jim Gerkin	July 1, 2012	309	4.05
Linda, Bob's mother, comes to visit to help with Toby, but she ends up driving Amy crazy. Amy asks Teddy to get Linda away from her as much as possible. Meanwhile, Teddy and Spencer celebrate their tenth-month anniversary since they got back together, but it did not turn out well since Linda accompanied them. Meanwhile, Gabe and PJ find an old unmailed letter in a box of old things that Mrs. Dabney gave them. The letter says that a large amount of money is buried in Mrs. Dabney's backyard. Mischievous as they are, they start digging the exact location to find the money. In the end, Gabe and PJ realize they were part of Mrs. Dabney's evil scheme to get a hot tub, so they pay her back with putting Green dye in her hot tub. Special guest star: Shirley Jones as Linda Guest stars: Shane Harper as Spencer, Patricia Belcher as Mrs. Dabney, Hong Chau as Theresa Note: This episode marks the first showing of the third season cast photo at the final scene of the opening credits.
65	9	"Baby's First Vacation"	Shannon Flynn	Dan Staley	July 15, 2012	310	3.58
The family decides to take a vacation to Dead Man's Lake when Teddy apparently comes down with a bad cold, so she convinces the family to go without her. As soon as the rest of the family arrive at the lake, they become convinced that the house they are staying in is actually haunted. Meanwhile, it is revealed that Teddy pretended to be sick in order not to go on the vacation and she and Ivy (with the help of fellow student, Victor) throw a house party while the rest of the family is gone. Mrs. Dabney blows their cover so they make a deal; Amy and Bob eventually find out and Teddy gets in trouble. While they were at Dead Man's Lake, the Duncans find out that they are on a prank TV show called "Scary House". Guest stars: Raven Goodwin as Ivy, Patricia Belcher as Mrs. Dabney, Jeff Doucette as Willard, Kevin Covais as Victor Note: A special preview of this episode was shown on DisneyChannel.com before it premiered on television.
66	10	"Wentz's Weather Girls"	Eric Allan Kramer	Phil Baker & Drew Vaupen	July 29, 2012	311	3.01
Harry, Ivy's father, is depressed about winning a lousy plumbing award and Teddy convinces him to keep pursuing his life-long dreams. Taking Teddy's advice, Harry opens a weather themed restaurant. Teddy and Ivy get jobs as waitresses, but they find out they have to be part of the restaurant's weather show. Teddy and Ivy do not like it, so they try to get fired. Meanwhile, Gabe begins to like a girl at school named Jade and tries to convince her that he has a soft side. Back at the park, PJ and Emmett decide to have a rematch of the baby race (that they had in episode "Double Whammy"), but this time on tricycles. Guest stars: Raven Goodwin as Ivy, Micah Stephen Williams as Emmett, Ellia English as Mary Lou, Isabella Palmieri as Jade, William Allen Young as Harry (uncredited)
67	11	"Baby Steps"	Bob Koherr	Tom Anderson	August 12, 2012	312	3.72
PJ announces that he is moving out and into an apartment with Emmett to be closer to college campus and also to start living on his own. Amy is heartbroken because PJ has grown-up so fast and is not ready for such a big change. Meanwhile, after having an awkward encounter with Lynn, Spencer's mother, Teddy believes that she does not like her, so Teddy decides to take her to her favorite restaurant in order for them to bond. Elsewhere, Gabe discovers that Bob is utterly afraid of carrying Toby up and down the staircase after he dropped Charlie years ago (in the first episode, "Study Date"). Guest stars: Shane Harper as Spencer, Micah Stephen Williams as Emmett, Andrea Bendewald as Lynn, Courtney Pauroso as Maureen, Robert John Brewer as Earl Note: Spencer's mother is played by Andrea Bendewald in this episode, but she was played by Stacey Travis in the episode "Charlie Goes Viral".
68	12	"T. Wrecks"	Tommy Thompson	Daniel Hsia	August 26, 2012	313	3.57
Teddy gets inspired to sign up for volleyball after attending Spencer's volleyball game. During practice, Mr. Hammerstone gives her the nickname, T. Wrecks. Teddy is overly nice and has difficulty relating to it. After having a dream that she is treated like a pushover due to her generosity, Teddy takes Hammer-stone's advice way too seriously and starts playing volleyball extremely aggressively. During a game VS the boys team, she even breaks Spencer's nose and also of Mr. Hammerstone. Meanwhile, Gabe tricks Amy into building his model rocket for his science class. Elsewhere, Bob finds solace at PJ's apartment since the Duncan household has recently been loud and annoying. Guest stars: Shane Harper as Spencer, Micah Stephen Williams as Emmett, Sean O'Bryan as Mr. Hammerstone, Cyrina Fiallo as Vonnie
69	13	"Teddy and the Bambino"	Bob Koherr	Christopher Vane	September 16, 2012	314	3.74
When Amy's maternity leave is over, she returns to work at the hospital and, to her dismay, Karen is divorced and working as well. Amy starts having hallucinations of Charlie and Toby since she misses them so much. With both Amy and Bob working, Gabe and PJ are assigned to watch over Charlie, but things go awry when Charlie sneaks out and goes to Mrs. Dabney's. Meanwhile, Teddy attends the annual Student U.N. competition school debate alongside Victor. Toby nearly causes Teddy and Victor to lose due to his frequent crying. Luckily, the sound of music soothes him, so Teddy and Victor sing their final presentation, which leads them to victory. In the end, Amy becomes a stay-at-home mother, and Bob child-proofs all the locks so Charlie will not leave again. Guest stars: Patricia Belcher as Mrs. Dabney, Brooke Dillman as Karen, Phil Abrams as Mr. Piper, Kevin Covais as Victor, Juliette Goglia as Victoria, Ivar Brogger as Mr. Franklin
70	14	"Team Mom"	Bob Koherr	Erika Kaestle & Patrick McCarthy	September 23, 2012	315	3.58
Teddy's volleyball team is on a losing streak, so new team mom, Amy, invites them over for a team-bonding slumber party, including Kelsey and Vonnie, in the hopes that they will get along and work together to finally win a game. Meanwhile, Gabe starts dating Emma, and when Bob meets her father, Randy, he immediately becomes annoyed by him because he is way too clingy and has horrible manners. Elsewhere, PJ gets a job as a fragrance technician, and his new neighbor, Molly, mistakes him for a medical student, so PJ invites her over to make her even more impressed, but when Molly discovers the truth, she has been hiding something as well. She is, in fact, a clown much to PJ's dismay. Guest stars: Cyrina Fiallo as Vonnie, Coco Jones as Kelsey, Loren Lester as Randy, Galadriel Stineman as Molly, Olivia Stuck as Emma
71	15	"Le Halloween"	Bob Koherr	Dan Staley	October 7, 2012	318	4.20
It is Toby's first Halloween and Amy wants Bob to dress up. On Halloween day, Amy dresses up in a kangaroo costume, complete with a pouch for Toby and Charlie. On the other hand, Bob puts a cape on over his exterminator uniform and calls himself Captain Extermo. Amy believes his costume is lousy and not in the Halloween spirit. Plus, Teddy enjoys PJ's cooking, so she asks him to cook an authentic French meal in honor of her one-year anniversary since she got back together with Spencer. Teddy decides to have their date take place at PJ's apartment so Spencer will not suspect anything. Later, Teddy and Spencer arrive at PJ's apartment, which Teddy has decorated in a Parisian theme. Furthermore, Teddy becomes sad when she realizes Spencer does not remember how they met. But he makes it up to her by proving that he remembers for how long they had broken up. And they continue their dinner, and ended it with a clown attack. Meanwhile, Gabe is deceived by Mrs. Dabney into attending a ceremony in honor of her charitable work. Guest stars: Shane Harper as Spencer, Micah Stephen Williams as Emmett, Patricia Belcher as Mrs. Dabney, Jeff Nathan as Boom-Boom, Cynthia Sophiea as Mrs. Barnes, Teddy Rose Baker as Rose, Marleik "Mar Mar" Walker as Trevor, Joe Gieb as Tinkles
72	16	"Guys & Dolls"	Bob Koherr	Jim Gerkin	October 14, 2012	316	3.66
After Teddy and Spencer get into an argument, Spencer goes over to apologize, but, instead, ends up getting advice from Bob on how to handle a Duncan woman because, according to him, he is an "expert", unbeknownst that Amy is overhearing their conversation. Amy tells Teddy how to handle such situation, and Spencer apologizes later on. Meanwhile, Bob has been on Gabe's case lately, so in order to get out of yard work, he and his friend, Logan, spend the weekend at PJ's apartment. Plus, Amy is concerned that Charlie still does not get along with Toby, so she convinces Charlie that Toby can talk. When Charlie and Toby are alone, Amy uses a baby monitor and pretends to be Toby. When Amy asks Charlie if she loves Toby, she responds by saying "yes" and it warms Amy's heart. Guest stars: Shane Harper as Spencer, Ryan Lee as Logan, Patrick Cox as Sam
73	17	"Nurse Blankenhooper"	Bob Koherr	Phil Baker & Drew Vaupen	October 28, 2012	317	3.51
Just as Gabe is turning popular, Amy gets a part-time nursing job at his school. Gabe does not want Amy to ruin his biggest accomplishment, so they agree to pretend to not know each other; Amy uses her maiden name, Blankenhooper. Meanwhile, Teddy and Vonnie team-up to do a class project, but the only reason Vonnie chose Teddy was to earn a good grade. However, a problem ensues when Teddy gets sick with laryngitis and is unable to speak, leaving a clueless Vonnie is horrified because now she must do their project. Meanwhile, PJ has to baby-sit Charlie and Toby while Amy is working. After PJ's neighbor pays him to baby-sit her children, PJ and Emmett start a baby-sitting service. Guest stars: Micah Stephen Williams as Emmett, Cyrina Fiallo as Vonnie, Dillon Lane as Walker, Davenia McFadden as Verna, Julia Cho as Mindy
74	18	"Charlie Whisperer"	Leigh-Allyn Baker	Jonah Kuehner & Bo Belanger	November 4, 2012	319	3.28
Teddy is excited when the community theater doing a production her play, with Ivy as the director. Teddy wants Ivy to cast Charlie as the lead role, but first, she must audition. At the audition, Charlie refuses to say her line, but the next girl, Tammy, rocks her audition, and makes Teddy jealous, so she pushes Ivy to cast Charlie as the princess, hoping that she will say her line. Meanwhile, Bob has lost much weight, and he is excited that he can finally shop for regular clothes. Everyone is stunned when Bob gets carried away with his new makeover. Elsewhere, Gabe must do a report on an older person, so he decides to write it on their neighbor, Bert Doogan, stating that he had an amazing career as an astronaut. His teacher tells him that if Bert speaks to the class, she will give him extra-credit. When Bert refuses to show up and lie about his job, Gabe makes PJ pose as Bert. Guest stars: Raven Goodwin as Ivy, Frank Collison as Vern, Dan Desmond as Bert, Angel Laketa Moore as Miss Bates, Gianna Gomez as Tammy
75	19	"Study Buddy"	Tommy Thompson	Erika Kaestle & Patrick McCarthy	November 11, 2012	321	2.75
With the SAT's approaching, Teddy wants to ace it, so she asks Victor to prep her since he earned a perfect score. Teddy quickly regrets asking for his help when she realizes how demanding and strict his teaching methods are. Meanwhile, Bob's constant snoring is keeping Toby awake at night, so Amy makes Bob sleep with Gabe, temporarily. Elsewhere, PJ is asked to read Charlie her favorite book, The Littlest Unicorn. At first, PJ believes the book is going to be ridiculous; but on the contrary, he instantly gets hooked and obsessed with finishing it. Guest stars: Kevin Covais as Victor, Kyle Chebbi as Andrew
76	20	"A Duncan Christmas"	Bob Koherr	Christopher Vane	December 2, 2012	320	4.20
Linda, Bob's mother, returns once again to celebrate Christmas with the Duncan family much to Amy's dismay. Things go awry when Amy and Linda learn they are performing the same song at the annual Duncan Christmas Eve talent show. Meanwhile, Teddy and Spencer take Charlie to see Santa Claus at Super Adventure Land, but when Santa decides to leave when it is their turn, Teddy takes matters into her own hands. Elsewhere, Bob struggles to find the perfect gift for Amy. Special guest star: Shirley Jones as Linda Guest stars: Shane Harper as Spencer, Rick Hall as Sheriff, Steve Seagren as Santa Song featured: "My Song for You", by Bridgit Mendler and Shane Harper
77	21	"All Fall Down"	Bob Koherr	Dan Staley & Drew Vaupen & Phil Baker	January 20, 2013	322–323	4.25
Teddy is heartbroken when Spencer receives an offer to move to Boston to after being admitted to a performing arts school. Now, they must deal with maintaining a long distance relationship. Spencer says he loves her, and Teddy replies by saying she loves him too and is going to miss him so much. Meanwhile, Bob catches a rare species of termites, which later get loose in the house and accidentally destroy everything. Elsewhere, Amy starts her own mommy blog to compete with Debbie Dooley. With Toby now sleeping in his room, Gabe tries to find a new room for himself in the house. In the end, the termites that Bob let in destroy the entire house and the Duncans are living in a hotel for the time being. After that, PJ tells the family that he dropped out of college, but only because he wants to go attend culinary school. Special guest star: Fred Willard as Herb Guest stars: Raven Goodwin as Ivy, Shane Harper as Spencer, Cyrina Fiallo as Vonnie, Frank Collison as Vern, Ericka Kreutz as Debbie Dooley, Coco Jones as Kelsey, Deena Dill as Jan, Matt Pascua as Rex Note: This is the special season 3 one-hour finale.

=== Season 4 (2013–14) ===
On July 12, 2012, Disney Channel renewed Good Luck Charlie for a fourth season. The fourth season premiered on April 28, 2013, with a guest appearance by The Muppets. Logan Moreau guest starred as Toby Duncan throughout the fourth season. Luke Benward also recurred in a six-episode arc this season. Benward and Jason Dolley previously worked together in the 2008 Disney Channel Original Movie Minutemen. Ava Sambora (daughter of Heather Locklear and Richie Sambora) guest starred in the episode "Futuredrama" as an older version of Charlie. It was confirmed on June 11, 2013, that season 4 would be the final season, slated to end on February 16, 2014. On June 20, 2013, it was announced that one of the final episodes of the series would feature a lesbian couple, the first episode of a Disney Channel series to do so.

No. overall	No. in season	Title	Directed by	Written by	Original release date	Prod. code	U.S. viewers (millions)
78	1	"Duncan Dream House"	Bob Koherr	Phil Baker & Drew Vaupen	April 28, 2013	401	3.90
The Duncans stay in a hotel after their house is destroyed by termites. The Duncans decide whether they should renovate their termite-destroyed house, or completely rebuild a new one. Both Charlie's and Teddy's feelings about the house are influenced by their imaginations, with Charlie talking to her Gurgles toy and Teddy having a dream with The Muppets. Meanwhile, Gabe pretends to be a child prodigy accountant named Ted Johnson, to get free food at an accounting seminar at the hotel. Elsewhere, PJ and Emmett try to get out of their apartment lease, to move into a much better apartment. Special guest stars: Steve Whitmire as Kermit the Frog, Eric Jacobson as Miss Piggy, Fozzie Bear, and Animal Guest stars: Micah Stephen Williams as Emmett, Logan Moreau as Toby, Joel McKinnon Miller as Kevin, Mark Christopher Lawrence as Bernie, Eamonn Roche as Derek, Michelan Sisti as Circle Gurgle
79	2	"Doppel Date"	Bob Koherr	Erika Kaestle & Patrick McCarthy	May 5, 2013	402	3.70
After learning that Spencer is dating a new girl, Teddy decides to date someone new as well, but her new guy looks very much like Spencer. Bob and Gabe buy an extravagant new couch, much to Amy's dismay. PJ starts his first day at culinary school, and becomes the butt of his teacher's jokes. Guest stars: Raven Goodwin as Ivy, Shane Harper as Spencer, Jonathan Ryland as Chef Byron Wainwright, Marieve Herington as Winnie, P.J. Marino as Fritz, Chad W. Smathers as Zack, Logan Moreau as Toby Note: Bridgit Mendler plays two roles, Teddy and Gigi. Gigi was also the nickname Teddy used in the episode 'Ditch Day'.
80	3	"Demolition Dabney"	Bob Koherr	Christopher Vane	May 12, 2013	403	2.78
Gabe develops a crush on a new neighbor, Lauren – until he realizes that she is Mrs. Dabney's granddaughter. Amy decides to film Teddy's Yale University interview for a segment on Good Morning Denver. Bob tries to come up with a way to bring in new customers for the extermination business. Guest stars: Patricia Belcher as Mrs. Dabney, Frank Collison as Vern, Logan Moreau as Toby, Jaylen Barron as Lauren, Jonathan Emerson as Lionel Van Ness
81	4	"Go Teddy!"	Bob Koherr	Jim Gerkin	May 19, 2013	404	2.68
After discovering the school cheerleading competition is in Oahu (Hawaii), Teddy joins Kelsey on the team. Teddy performs poorly at the tryout and begs the coach Lutes for a second chance. Teddy aces her second tryout only to find out that the cheer competition is in Columbus, Ohio, Kelsey having conflated the two place names. Meanwhile, Amy asks PJ and Gabe to take Toby to the park. Bob tries to outsmart Charlie's pre-school guidelines, when they prohibit him from wearing sleepwear when dropping off Charlie. Guest stars: Coco Jones as Kelsey, Karen Maruyama as Mrs. Lutes, Logan Moreau as Toby, Cheryl Lynn Bowers as Emily
82	5	"Rock Enroll"	Bob Koherr	Drew Vaupen & Phil Baker	June 2, 2013	405	3.24
Teddy struggles to write an essay about her life for college enrollment. A student from Gabe's old elementary school asks for his advice on pranking a teacher. PJ reluctantly goes with Bob to concert to see an old 1980s rock band. Guest stars: Patricia Belcher as Mrs. Dabney, Ericka Kreutz as Debbie Dooley, Dan Desmond as Bert Dugan, Logan Moreau as Toby, Tenzing Trainor as Devan, Christopher Gehrman as Mr. Singer
83	6	"The Unusual Suspects"	Tommy Thompson	Tom Anderson	June 8, 2013	406	1.91
Teddy receives threatening notes from a mystery student. Amy and Debbie Dooley argue about who has been teaching both their daughters rude language. Gabe has PJ pretend to be his legal guardian, to avoid showing Amy and Bob his bad report card. Guest stars: Raven Goodwin as Ivy, Patricia Belcher as Mrs. Dabney (voice only), Kevin Covais as Victor, Ericka Kreutz as Debbie Dooley, Logan Moreau as Toby, Juliette Goglia as Victoria, Steve Witting as Doug Dooley, Charles Emmett as Mr. Rose, Austin Rogers as Petey
84	7	"Rat-A-Teddy"	Eric Allan Kramer	Erika Kaestle & Patrick McCarthy	June 23, 2013	407	3.38
Teddy throws a sleepover at PJ's apartment to forget about her anniversary with Spencer, while PJ and Emmett take care of their neighbor's pet rat while he is away. After Verne quits working for Bob to start his extermination business, Bob hires a teenager named Beau, as a replacement. Amy and Mrs. Dabney use Gabe and Lauren to trick each other to do their chores but tables turn when Gabe and Lauren find out. Guest stars: Luke Benward as Beau, Patricia Belcher as Mrs. Dabney, Micah Stephen Williams as Emmett, Cyrina Fiallo as Vonnie, Coco Jones as Kelsey, Jaylen Barron as Lauren, Logan Moreau as Toby
85	8	"Charlie 4, Toby 1"	Bruce Leddy	Annie Levine & Jonathan Emerson	July 14, 2013	409	2.86
Amy goes overboard with Charlie's birthday party. Teddy answers the phone at Bob's Bugs Be Gone and helps Beau break up with his girlfriend back in his hometown. Gabe is sent home from school after accidentally getting into a fight and becomes known as the new tough guy in school. Guest stars: Luke Benward as Beau, Ericka Kreutz as Debbie Dooley, Logan Moreau as Toby, Stuart Allan as Noah, Lexi Medrano as Natalie, Kathryn Collins as Julie, Dawson Fletcher as Bryce
86	9	"Futuredrama"	Bruce Leddy	Erika Kaestle & Patrick McCarthy	July 28, 2013	414	3.36
A future Charlie looks for advice from Teddy's video diaries to resolve an issue when a future Toby gives Charlie the silent treatment. In the video diary, Teddy tells a story of how she thought she was helping Gabe after she overhears Lauren needing to talk to Gabe about their relationship. Assuming that Lauren wants to break up with Gabe, Gabe goes on the break up with Lauren first, only to find out that Lauren did not want to break up with Gabe. Because of this, Gabe gives Teddy the silent treatment. Teddy tells Charlie that a young Gabe used to like being tickled, as this usually solved their problems, only for Charlie to end up with a broken nose. She also learns that she should always finish watching Teddy's videos before she tries anything. Meanwhile, in the present, Amy, Bob, and PJ, as well as the rest of the neighborhood, work together to find out who has been soaping the cars, only to find out that Mrs. Dobbs, another neighbor, planned the whole scheme in order to spend time with Bert. Guest stars: Patricia Belcher as Mrs. Dabney, Ericka Kreutz as Debbie Dooley, Dan Desmond as Bert Dugan, Jaylen Barron as Lauren, Logan Moreau as Toby, Susan Ruttan as Mrs. Dobbs, Ava Sambora as Future Charlie, Stone Eisenmann as Future Toby, Cooper Roth as Tommy
87	10	"Teddy's New Beau"	Bruce Leddy	Christopher Vane	August 4, 2013	410	2.71
Beau and Teddy go on a date to a Western-themed restaurant. Meanwhile, Bob and Amy are planning to go to dinner with the Wentzs, but the Wentzs cancel, so Bob and Amy go to dinner by themselves and get a big surprise. Back at home, PJ is in charge of Gabe, Charlie, and Toby, and is set on being responsible for the first time, but it goes wrong when PJ spills grape juice on the new couch. When they go to a furniture to get an identical one, there is not one. Gabe sees a green couch that looks just like their old one and tells PJ they should get that and trick Bob and Amy's brains. Guest stars: Luke Benward as Beau, Ellia English as Mary Lou, Logan Moreau as Toby, Jim O'Heir as Alan, Ray Ford as Donald, William Allen Young as Harry (uncredited)
88	11	"Teddy's Choice"	Bob Koherr	Jim Gerkin	August 11, 2013	411	3.17
The family celebrates Teddy's 18th birthday party including Beau, but Spencer unexpectedly shows up and tells Teddy that he still has feelings for her, which pressures Teddy into choosing between him and Beau. In the end, Teddy chooses Beau because her relationship with Spencer was too hard and Spencer said they could not be friends because it was too hard to be friends with her for him, because he was still in love with her. Meanwhile, Bob accidentally purchases a girl shirt for Gabe, and Gabe wears it to school and girls laugh at the shirt on him and ask him why is he wearing a girls shirt. So Bob wears a girl shirt himself to prove to Gabe that it does not matter what other people think. Also PJ's cooking instructor pretends to enjoy everything PJ does in order to get a good review on a teacher evaluation. Guest stars: Luke Benward as Beau, Shane Harper as Spencer, Logan Moreau as Toby, Jonathan Ryland as Chef Byron Wainwright, Marieve Herington as Winnie, Tiffany Espensen as Kelly
89	12	"Bug Prom"	Bob Koherr	Phil Baker & Drew Vaupen	September 15, 2013	412	3.32
Bob drags Amy along to Denver Pest Control Association's annual function (Bug Prom). Amy complains that she has to go, and Teddy is glad that she does not have to go to one of these outings, until Beau asks her to go. The night turns into a disaster when Teddy finds out that Beau's aunt Karen is actually the woman that Amy cannot stand, the one who worked at the hospital with her. Karen and Amy have a dance off competition. Gabe gets tickets to watch a new movie with Lauren, but she ends up going camping and so Mrs. Dabney tells Gabe to take her to the movies instead so the ticket is not wasted. Gabe agrees, but Mrs. Dabney talks loud in the theatre, and she and Gabe get kicked out. Meanwhile, PJ watches over Charlie and Toby, and also has to bake a cake for cooking school. It ends up not tasting that great, but then Charlie bakes a cake in her little oven which tastes really good, so PJ wants to forge it as his own. Guest stars: Luke Benward as Beau, Patricia Belcher as Mrs. Dabney, Brooke Dillman as Karen, Logan Moreau as Toby, Coy Stewart as Warren, Gary Kraus as Jerry, Brooke Baumer as Phyllis, Jason Shipman as Usher
90	13	"Weekend in Vegas"	Phill Lewis	Jim Gerkin	September 22, 2013	416	2.79
With their high school graduation approaching, Teddy and Ivy come up with a bucket list of things to do before they graduate. When Ivy suggest a road trip, Teddy then finds herself stuck en route to Las Vegas, New Mexico with the Wentz family in their new RV. Meanwhile, Amy is offended by Gabe not telling her that he joined a baseball team, due to her unruly embarrassing behavior at Gabe's sporting events in the past. Bert and Mrs. Dobbs announce that they are getting married and leave Bob and PJ to plan the bachelor party and the wedding. Guest stars: Raven Goodwin as Ivy, Ellia English as Mary Lou, Dan Desmond as Bert Dugan, Logan Moreau as Toby, Susan Ruttan as Mrs. Dobbs, Marshall Manesh as Arnie, Pat Battistini as Umpire, William Allen Young as Harry (uncredited)
91	14	"Fright Night"	Bob Koherr	Christopher Vane	October 6, 2013	415	3.27
It is Halloween and to raise money for the school drama club, Teddy, Vonnie, Kelsey and Victor sing Christmas carols with a Halloween spin. But when Victor falls into a hole and cannot get out, things start to get really spooky. Gabe and PJ get spooked by PJ's creepy neighbor. Amy's jack-o-lanterns that she planned to show on her news segment get rotten but she saves the show with her new Halloween segment about Victor falling into the hole. Bob and Charlie stay at home and give out Halloween candy to trick-or-treaters. Guest stars: Coco Jones as Kelsey, Kevin Covais as Victor, Cyrina Fiallo as Vonnie, Logan Moreau as Toby, Katelyn Reed as Gracie, Eliza Coyle as Lorna, Dale Godboldo as Chet, Sheila Shaw as Mrs. Norton, Hayden Signoretti as Julian, Nicolas Bechtel as Hudson
92	15	"Sister, Sister"	Bob Koherr	Dan Staley	October 13, 2013	408	3.07
Teddy tries to reconcile Amy and her twin sister, Jamie (also played by Baker), years after a school crush chose Amy, breaking Jamie's heart. A misunderstanding happens between PJ and his fellow culinary school classmate Winnie. Gabe and Jake use Toby's face for advertising, to earn extra money. Guest stars: Tucker Albrizzi as Jake, Logan Moreau as Toby, Jonathan Ryland as Chef Byron Wainwright, Marieve Herington as Winnie, John Ross Bowie as Walter
93	16	"Bob's Beau-Be-Gone"	Leigh-Allyn Baker	Tom Anderson	November 10, 2013	413	3.21
Just as Bob and Beau become ever more close, Beau gets a job offer in his hometown of Tennessee, with him having to say goodbye to Teddy and Bob. With the monthly rent due, PJ and Emmett search for a new roommate to share the expenses. Gabe tries to get Amy's much delayed news segment on the air, so she can stop intruding on his alone time with Lauren. Guest stars: Luke Benward as Beau, Micah Stephen Williams as Emmett, Jaylen Barron as Lauren, Logan Moreau as Toby, Ely Henry as Brian, Collin Lee Turner as Andy
94	17	"Good Luck Jessie: NYC Christmas"	Phill Lewis and Rich Correll	Bo Belanger & Jonah Kuehner and Valerie Ahern & Christian McLaughlin	November 29, 2013	418	5.79
When Teddy gets accepted into a college in New York City, she goes to New York, alongside PJ. PJ stays at a hot dog cart and gets back together with Skyler. Meanwhile, Teddy misses her tour on the subway and meets up with Jessie Prescott and Zuri Ross. When a blizzard traps Teddy and PJ in New York City, they decide to stay with Jessie and Zuri. Also, back in Colorado, Amy and Bob try to figure out what Charlie wants for Christmas. The next morning, Jessie, Ravi, Luke, Emma, Zuri, Teddy and PJ cannot remember anything and the presents are gone. In the end, Teddy's video diary shows them that after she and Zuri brought a reindeer named Prancer into the house, he went crazy and Ravi tried to make a knockout experiment but Luke messed it up, turned it into a Knockout Memory Eraseing Vapor, causing everyone to fall asleep and remember nothing. Meanwhile, Amy and Bob are at a loss for what Charlie wants for Christmas and fail to get the information from a mall Santa. Miraculously, Gabe buys Charlie what she wanted and reveals that Charlie has been talking about it non-stop for weeks. Guest stars: Dana Durey as Marcy, Samantha Boscarino as Skyler, Amir K as George, Paul Willson as Santa #2, Logan Moreau as Toby, Joe Gieb as Joe, Peter Allen Vogt as Santa, Mike Batayeh as Sal, Gabby Sanalitro as Ada Notes: This is a combined 48-minute special episode for both Good Luck Charlie and Jessie. The opening credit sequences show both shows' casts with theme music from both shows. In the United Kingdom, this episode had 271,000 viewers when it premiered on December 6, 2013.
95	18	"Accepted"	Bob Koherr	Gigi M. Green	January 19, 2014	417	2.90
Amy wants to ride a scooter with Gabe around the neighborhood much to his dismay. Meanwhile, Teddy is on the wait list for her first choice for her future college. Bob goes to Charlie's school to tell jokes. Guest stars: Kevin Covais as Victor, Daniel Riordan as Principal Higgins, River Alexander as Paul, Kerry Carney as Lily, Stacy Hall as Officer Wright, Logan Moreau as Toby
96	19	"Down a Tree"	Erika Kaestle	Dan Staley	January 26, 2014	419	2.45
Gabe discovers that PJ is living in the Duncan tree house after he and Emmett can no longer pay the rent on their apartment. Teddy helps Ivy's parents deal with the transition of their daughter leaving for college. Amy and Bob arrange a play-date with one of Charlie's friends and find out she is the daughter of a lesbian couple. Guest stars: Raven Goodwin as Ivy, Micah Stephen Williams as Emmett, Ellia English as Mary Lou, Logan Moreau as Toby, Desi Lydic as Susan, Lilli Birdsell as Cheryl, William Allen Young as Harry (uncredited)
97	20	"Good Bye Charlie"	Bob Koherr	Phil Baker & Drew Vaupen & Dan Staley	February 16, 2014	420–421	4.58
Teddy finds it hard to make the last diary special. Amy is trying to get herself a full-time job on Good Morning Denver since the main lady is leaving the show. Gabe and Mrs. Dabney try to stop the new kid Matt, from pranking her. PJ and his friend Gravy try to have a food truck and sell Fish and Gravy but PJ does not think it is a good idea. PJ then gets the truck for himself and Bob gets to work with PJ selling peanut butter and jelly sandwiches which everyone finds very good. Bob and Charlie find out Spencer is back in town and Teddy wants him at her going away party. Spencer said he'd think about it and then comes along with Victor, Skylar, Emmett, Mrs. Dabney, Lauren and Vonnie come to say goodbye. Teddy and Spencer sing a song because Charlie wants them to. The next day, when Spencer visits the Duncans because he left his jacket, Teddy and Spencer figure their colleges are not so far away from each other and they should meet up as friends. Before Spencer leaves, they kiss twice and end up back together. Everyone then gets rid of their new neighbors with a marching band practice which they would have every day. Mrs. Dabney sees that Toby will be the next "devil child." The series ends with Teddy making the last video diary with the whole family and they say together, "Good luck, Charlie", also joined by Charlie. Guest stars: Shane Harper as Spencer, Patricia Belcher as Mrs. Dabney, Micah Stephen Williams as Emmett, Samantha Boscarino as Skyler, Ericka Kreutz as Debbie Dooley, Logan Moreau as Toby, Jaylen Barron as Lauren, Andrew Caldwell as Gravy, Peter Hulne as Phil, Rio Mangini as Matt, Kalia Fullerton as Sarah, Meredith Bishop as Rhonda, Kevin Covais as Victor, Cyrina Fiallo as Vonnie Note: This is a one-hour special episode. Toby did not appear when the family said "Good luck, Charlie".
