= I'm Beginning to See the Light (film) =

2025 American film by Konstantin Khudyakov

- Theatrical release poster
- Directed by: Konstantin Khudyakov
- Screenplay by: Marc Bacci
- Story by: Konstantin Khudyakov
- Produced by: Pavel Hoodyakov
- Starring: Jack Huston; Abbie Cornish; Brandon T. Jackson; Jamie Chung; Mark Boone Junior; Lucy Punch
- Cinematography: Maz Makhani
- Edited by: Konstantin Kochubey
- Music by: Walter Afanasieff
- Production company: Hoody Films
- Distributed by: Gravitas Ventures
- Release date: May 2, 2025
- Running time: 104 minutes
- Country: United States
- Language: English

I'm Beginning to See the Light is a 2025 American drama film written by Konstantin Khudyakov and Mark Bacci, directed by Khudyakov and starring Jack Huston, Abbie Cornish, Brandon T. Jackson, Jamie Chung, Mark Boone Junior and Lucy Punch.

== Plot ==
Grieving jazz trumpeter Ezra retreats to a remote lighthouse after a tragic car crash kills his family, and there he’s mistaken for the keeper and forced into isolation. When two suicidal visitors arrive, Sam and Hannah, his solitary existence begins to unravel, offering an unexpected chance at redemption through helping the lost souls drawn to his refuge.

== Cast ==
- Jack Huston as Ezra
- Brandon T. Jackson as Sam
- Abbie Cornish as Hannah
- Lucy Punch as Sheryl
- Jamie Chung as Sarah
- Mark Boone Junior as Burly Man
- Dave Adams as Police Officer

== Production ==
In April 2023, it was announced that Huston and Cornish were cast in the film. Later that same month, it was announced that filming had begun and that Jackson and Chung were also cast.

== Release ==
In March 2025, it was announced that Gravitas Ventures acquired U.S. and Canadian distribution to the film, which would be released in May 2025. The film was released in the United States on May 2, 2025.

== Reception ==
Bradley Gibson of Film Threat rated the film 8 out of 10.
