= Big Mommas: Like Father, Like Son =

2011 film by John Whitesell

- Theatrical release poster
- Directed by: John Whitesell
- Screenplay by: Matthew Fogel
- Story by: Matthew Fogel; Don Rhymer
- Based on: Characters by Darryl Quarles
- Produced by: David T. Friendly; Michael Green
- Starring: Martin Lawrence; Brandon T. Jackson; Jessica Lucas; Portia Doubleday; Michelle Ang; Emily Rios; Tony Curran
- Cinematography: Anthony B. Richmond
- Edited by: Priscilla Nedd-Friendly
- Music by: David Newman
- Production companies: Regency Enterprises; New Regency; Friendly Films; Runteldat Entertainment; The Collective; Dune Entertainment
- Distributed by: 20th Century Fox
- Release date: February 18, 2011
- Running time: 107 minutes
- Country: United States
- Language: English
- Budget: $32 million
- Box office: $82.7 million

Big Mommas: Like Father, Like Son is a 2011 American crime comedy film. It is the third and final installment in the Big Momma film trilogy, and a sequel to 2000's Big Momma's House and 2006's Big Momma's House 2.

The film was directed by John Whitesell and stars Martin Lawrence reprising his role as FBI agent Malcolm Turner. Lawrence is the only returning star from the original cast. Trent Pierce, Turner's stepson, originally played by Jascha Washington, who is a character from the previous two films, is now played by actor and stand-up comedian Brandon T. Jackson. The film was released on February 18, 2011, by 20th Century Fox to mostly negative reviews from critics, but it grossed $82.7 million against a $32 million budget.

== Plot ==
FBI agent Malcolm Turner is elated to learn that his stepson, Trent Pierce, has been accepted to attend Duke University. However, Trent, who is a rapper under the alias "Prodi-G", instead wants Malcolm to sign a recording contract for him since he is underage. When Malcolm refuses, Trent's best friends encourage him to ambush Malcolm on the job in order to obtain the signature.

Malcolm, in an attempt to capture Russian gang member Chirkoff, uses an informant named Canetti to deliver a flash drive to the gang. Canetti reveals that the flash drive is empty and a duplicate is hidden with a friend at the Georgia Girls School for the Arts.

During the exchange, Canetti's cover is blown and he is killed, which Trent witnesses. Malcolm eventually rescues Trent and they escape, but as Trent's car was left at the scene Malcolm knows the gang members will be able to track them down so the two are forced to hide undercover. Malcolm once again becomes his wife Sherry's grandmother, Big Momma, and also disguises Trent as an obese girl named "Charmaine", Big Momma's great-niece. Big Momma takes a job as a house mother at the school, while Charmaine is enrolled as a student.

Surrounded by attractive young women, Trent nearly blows his cover, but befriends a girl named Haley Robinson. The headmistress announces that a historic music box has been stolen from the library, and Malcolm deduces that it contains the flash drive. While scoping out the library, Malcolm encounters security guard Kurtis Kool, who attempts to woo him while giving a tour. Seeing a picture of Kurtis with Canetti, Malcolm realizes that he is the friend, and tries to find out more about the music box.

Meanwhile, the gang members approach Trent's best friends, posing as record producers, and encourage them to notify them of Trent's whereabouts. Trent sets up a date between Haley; he reverts to his true self and the date goes well, but an encounter with his best friends alerts the gang members to tail them.

Trent helps Haley perfect her musical performance for the upcoming "Showcase" event, turning it into a duet. They exchange a kiss at the end of the date, while Haley encourages Trent to pursue college. Before the gang members can capture him, he changes back into his Charmaine disguise, throwing them off. Learning of an exchange between two students and Kurtis, Malcolm attempts to flirt with him in order to apprehend him for stealing the music box, but the secret exchange ends up being the stolen mascot from a rival school.

During this encounter, Malcolm reveals his true identity to Kurtis. After gaining the favor of several students by offering sage advice and comfort to them, he finally learns the music box was actually stolen by Haley. She did it to become a full-fledged member of the "Divas", a group of top artists in the school. As she is about to perform her duet, Malcolm forces Trent to retain his disguise, and he attempts to perform the duet with Haley as Charmaine, only to break disguise and ruin the performance. As Haley storms off, the gang members arrive and a chase ensues.

Trent accidentally draws their attention as he attempts to pursue Haley and explain himself. Just as he recovers the flash drive, the gang members catch up and hold him at gunpoint. Big Momma interferes and provides an escape, but all three are caught again and Malcolm's disguise is revealed. Just as Chirkoff is about to kill them, Kurtis arrives with a taser and saves the day.

Trent and Haley reconcile, and Malcolm signs the former's contract, only to have him tear it up and reveal his new plan to attend college. As the film ends, Malcolm and Trent make an agreement to keep the whole ordeal a secret from Sherry.

== Cast ==
- Martin Lawrence as Malcolm Turner / Hattie Mae 'Big Momma' Pierce
- Brandon T. Jackson as Trent Pierce / Charmaine Daisy Pierce
- Jessica Lucas as Haley Robinson
- Portia Doubleday as Jasmine
- Michelle Ang as Mia
- Emily Rios as Isabelle
- Tony Curran as Chirkoff
- Marc John Jefferies as Rembrandt
- Sherri Shepherd as Beverly Townsend
- Mari Morrow as Mrs. Mercier
- Faizon Love as Kurtis Kool (uncredited)
- Ken Jeong as Mailman
- Ana Ortiz as Gail Fletcher
- Max Casella as Anthony Canetti
- Brandon Gill as Scratch

== Production ==
New Regency Productions spent $32 million to make the film, less than the previous films in the series. They were able to reduce costs because Lawrence agreed to take a pay cut and thanks to tax incentives in Georgia. Principal photography began in April 2010.

The character of Trent Pierce, Turner's stepson, was recast. Brandon T. Jackson replaced Jascha Washington, who portrayed the character in the first two films.

== Music ==
A music video titled "Imma Do It Big" was released on February 9, 2011. The song is by Brandon T. Jackson and features One Chance and T-Pain. The song starts off with a verse by Jackson and then a verse from T-Pain, then another verse by Jackson, but this verse is rapped by his real-life alter ego Charmaine.

An official soundtrack album was released on February 15, 2011, featuring 14 tracks, including a cover of Ain't Nobody by Jackson and Jessica Lucas.

== Release ==
In addition to the theatrical version, an unrated and extended cut of the film (marketed as "The Motherload Edition") was released on DVD. The extended version contained five minutes of new footage, consisting of a song-and-dance musical number and slightly longer edits of various scenes.

== Reception ==
=== Box office ===
The film was released in North America on February 18, 2011, ranking #5 that weekend, with a gross of $16,300,803 from 2,821 theaters. It overall grossed $37,915,414 in the United States, and $44,770,652 elsewhere, for a worldwide total of $82,686,066.

=== Critical response ===
Big Mommas: Like Father, Like Son was panned by critics. On Rotten Tomatoes, the film has an approval rating of 5% based on 60 reviews with an average rating of 2.7/10. The site's critical consensus reads: "Unnecessary, unfunny, and generally unwelcome, Big Mommas: Like Father, Like Son offers more of the same for fans of Martin Lawrence's perplexingly popular series". On Metacritic, the film has a score of 22 out of 100 based on 14 critics, indicating "generally unfavorable" reviews. Audiences polled by CinemaScore gave the film an average grade of "B+" on an A+ to F scale.

Mike Hale of The New York Times noted strong similarities to Some Like It Hot and described Faizon Love's performance as the only amusing thing in the film.

=== Accolades ===
Award	Category	Subject	Result
Golden Raspberry Award	Worst Actress	Martin Lawrence	Nominated
Golden Raspberry Award	Worst Supporting Actress	Brandon T. Jackson	Nominated
Golden Raspberry Award	Worst Supporting Actor	Ken Jeong	Nominated

== See also ==
- List of black films of the 2010s
