= Like Mike 2: Streetball =

2006 American sports comedy film

- DVD cover
- Directed by: David Nelson
- Written by: Keith Mitchell; Allie Dvorin
- Based on: Characters by Michael Elliot
- Produced by: David Bixler
- Starring: Jascha Washington; Kel Mitchell; Brett Kelly; Micah Stephen Williams; Michael Beach
- Cinematography: Bert Dunk
- Edited by: Dennis M. Hill
- Music by: Stanley Clarke
- Distributed by: 20th Century Fox Home Entertainment
- Release date: June 6, 2006
- Running time: 92 minutes
- Country: United States
- Budget: $17 million

Like Mike 2: Streetball (simply titled Like Mike 2 in various regions) is a 2006 American sports comedy film directed by David Nelson. Contrary to the film title, it is not a plot continuation of the 2002 film nor does it feature any of the original cast members.

== Plot ==
Teenager Jerome Jenkins Jr. and his friends are skilled at streetball but cannot match the older boys in their neighborhood. When they learn that a streetball team called Game On is coming to town to scout for talent, they train intensely with hopes of winning. After a brief visit from his father, Jerome spots a pair of shoes hanging from a streetlight. Retrieving them, he witnesses the shoes being struck by lightning, granting the wearer the ability to play like Michael Jordan. At the Game On talent event, Jerome sinks a half-court shot and wins a one-on-one match with ease, earning a spot on the team. However, his success attracts envy, and his manipulative, self-proclaimed cousin Ray steps in as his agent, securing sponsorships while keeping Jerome under his control.

During the first Game On match with Jerome, the team struggles until he joins and helps them win. Afterwards, while his teammates go to a club, Jerome, being a minor, heads to an amusement park where he earns the streetball name "Triple J". Encouraged by Ray, he begins hogging the glory, straining his friendships with his friends. On a break from the team, Jerome’s father, Jerome Sr., returns home. Ray tries to have Jerome's mother sign a contract for a 15% cut of Jerome's earnings and sets him up for a music video. When Jerome’s father finds him during the shoot, a fight breaks out as Jerome disregards his dad’s advice.

Before the season’s final game against the top team, the Drop Squad, Ray pushes Jerome to wear sponsored shoes, but he refuses, believing his magic sneakers are key to his performance. Despite initially doing well, Ray secretly swaps Jerome's shoes, leading to a loss for the team. Upset, Jerome quits basketball. After a conversation with Ray, Jerome takes the bus home and tells his mother he’s done with the sport. She later kicks Ray out for his manipulative behaviour. Jerome reconciles with his friends, who encourage him to play for fun, and they form the team "Triple Threat". He also finds his magic shoes among Ray's belongings.

In the finals against Ray's new team, "Ray-On", Ray sabotages Jerome's sneakers, injuring a teammate. With his father’s support, Jerome makes the final shot without his magic shoes, winning the game for Triple Threat. Afterwards, sponsors show interest, but his father declines. Ray tries to resurrect the ripped contract, only to be locked in a trunk by a friend. The story concludes with Jerome walking home with his family, while Ray, still in the trunk, gets towed, and the shoes dangle from a streetlight.

== Cast ==
- Jascha Washington as Jerome "Triple J" Jenkins Jr.
- Kel Mitchell as Ray Thomkins
- Brett Kelly as Rodney Rheingold, Jerome's friend
- Micah Stephen Williams as Nathan Daniels, Jerome's other friend
- Michael Beach as Jerome "Double J" Jenkins Sr., Jerome's father
- Blu Mankuma as Coach Archie
- Michael Adamthwaite as Dalton "Miracle Whip"
- Moneca Delain as Lexi Lopez
- Enuka Okuma as Lydia Jenkins, Jerome's mother
- Mohammed Wenn as Raindrop
- Jonathan Mubanda as the Ghost in the Machine
- Joel Haywood as Cavity
- Viv Leacock as Preacher
- Adrian Holmes as Buck Wild
- Shay Kuebler and Graham Wardle as the Bullies
- Richard O'Sullivan as Baller
- Rob Morton as Hank
- Enid-Raye Adams as the KOTC Woman at the Desk
- Jason Emanuel as SureFire Marketing Rep
- Daniel Bacon and Leslie Hopps as the Trend Executives
- Josh Masters as Seven Footer
- Louis Johnson as Flex
- Clyde Drexler as the KOTC Announcer
- Christopher Lovick as the KOTC Ref
- Juanita Mirehouse and Jennifer Cheon Garcia as the Fly Girls
- Tom Pickett as the Hotel Guest
- Donny Lucas as Chauffeur
- Shaw Madson as A.D.
- David Mubanda as the Arena Opponent
- Brad Mann and Todd Mann as the Suits
- Dagmar Midcap as the TV Announcer
- Nathaniel DeVeaux as the Ghost's Father
- Brenda Crichlow as the Woman at the Desk
- Mark Cuban as the Drop Squad Coach
- Doug Abrahams as the Arena Ref
- James Whyte as the City Opponent

== Cameos ==
Former NBA player Clyde Drexler and Dallas Mavericks NBA team owner Mark Cuban both made cameos in this film, Drexler as himself and Cuban as a team's coach.

== See also ==
- List of basketball films
