= Brandon T. Jackson =

American actor and comedian (born 1984)

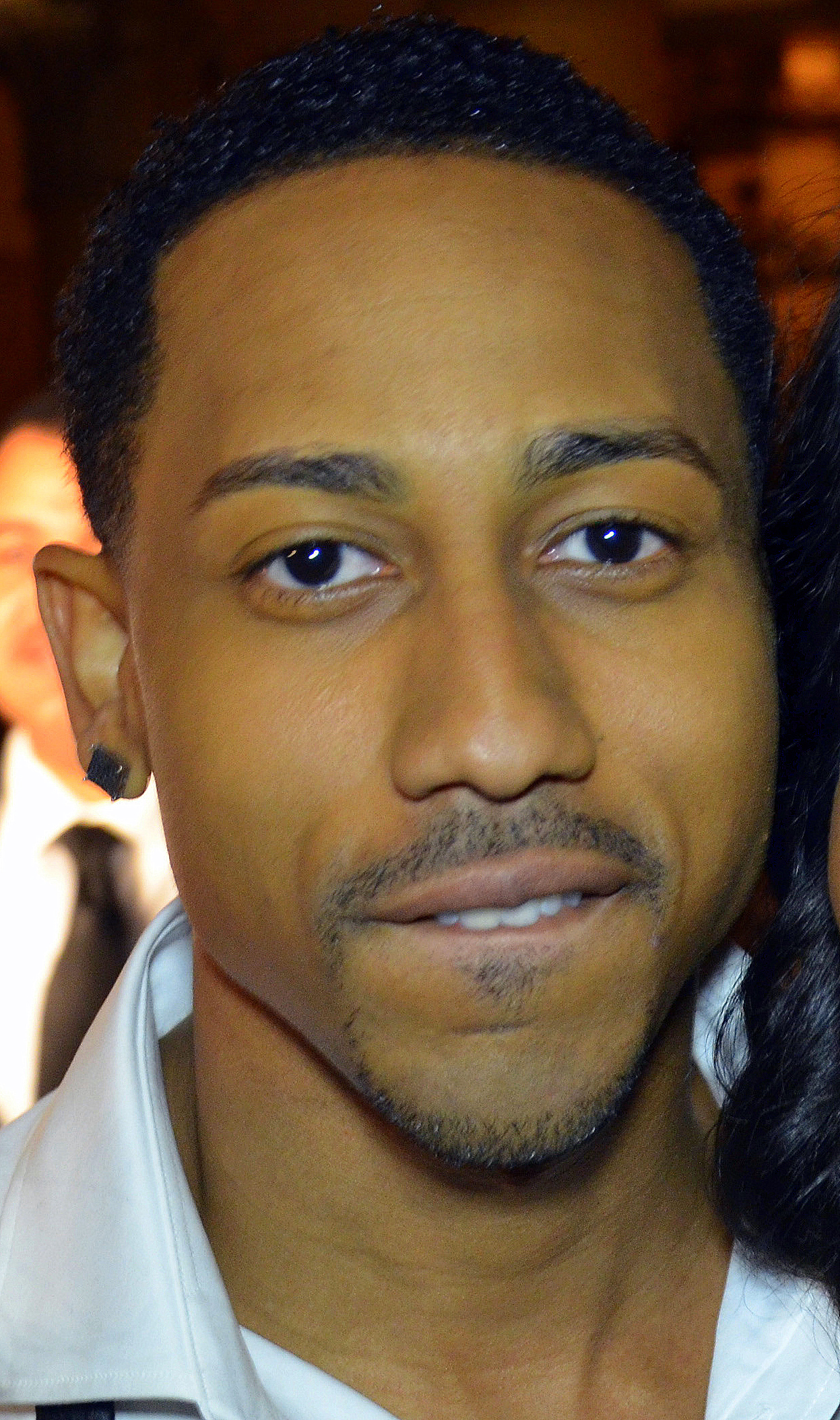
- Jackson in 2012
- Born: Brandon Timothy Jackson; March 7, 1984 (age 42); Detroit, Michigan, U.S.
- Occupations: Actor; comedian
- Years active: 1997–present
- Children: 4

Brandon Timothy Jackson (born March 7, 1984) is an American actor and stand-up comedian. He is known for his roles in the films Roll Bounce (2005), Tropic Thunder (2008), Percy Jackson & the Olympians: The Lightning Thief (2010), Lottery Ticket (2010), Big Mommas: Like Father, Like Son (2011), Percy Jackson: Sea of Monsters (2013), and Roofie Jackson in Deadbeat (2014–2016).

== Background ==
Jackson was born in Detroit, Michigan. His mother, Beverly Yvonne, is a pastor. His father, Bishop Wayne Timothy Jackson, is the senior pastor of Great Faith Ministries International, and author of the book Miracles Do Happen: The Power and Place of Miracles as a Sign to the World. His maternal grandfather, Royal Titus Bozeman, was a Pentecostal child preacher named a "Boy Wonder" by Indiana newspapers.

== Career ==
Jackson attended West Bloomfield High School. After graduation, he moved to Los Angeles to pursue stand-up comedy and started at the Laugh Factory, as well as opened for Wayne Brady and Chris Tucker. His role as Junior in the film Roll Bounce won him the 2006 Black Reel Award for Breakthrough Performance. He hosted one episode of the Brandon T. Jackson Show on The N channel. In 2006, Jackson hosted the Up Close and Personal Tour, featuring Chris Brown, Ne-Yo, Lil Wayne, Juelz Santana and Dem Franchize Boyz.

He was a cast member on the show Wild 'n Out with Nick Cannon, and then guest-starred as a celebrity team captain for the sixth season of the show. Jackson starred in the films Tropic Thunder as Alpa Chino, Percy Jackson as Grover Underwood and Lottery Ticket as Benny. He played 17-year-old Trent Pierce in Big Mommas: Like Father, Like Son (the sequel to Big Momma's House 2). He had a cameo in 'The Glee Project' season 2 video 'Here I Go Again' and can be seen when Maxfield gives him a flyer. In 2013, he played Axel Foley's son in an unaired pilot for a Beverly Hills Cop TV series.

== Filmography ==
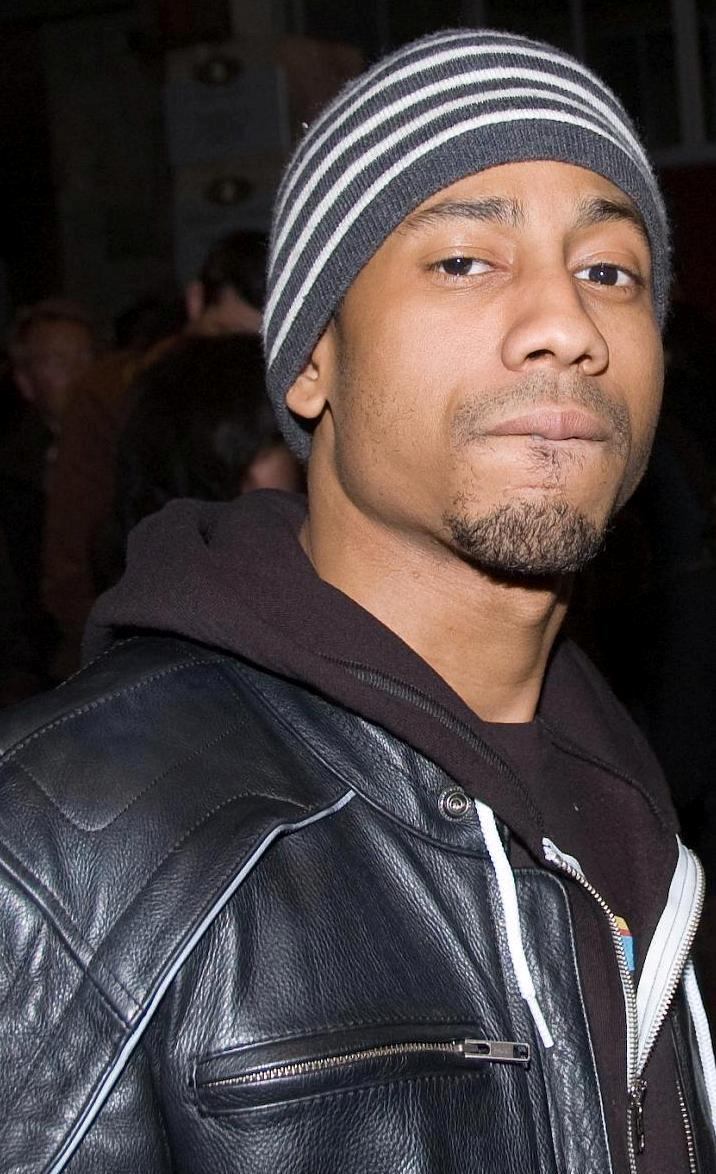
Jackson on January 15, 2009

=== Film ===
Year	Title	Role	Notes
2001	Nikita Blues	Tyrone	
2001	Ali	Club Goer	
2002	8 Mile	Chin Tiki Club Goer	
2005	Envy		
2005	Roll Bounce	Junior	
2005	House of Grimm		
2007	This Christmas	El Rey MC	
2007	Big Stan	Deshawn	
2008	Tropic Thunder	Alpa Chino	
2008	Days of Wrath	"Lil One"	
2008	The Day the Earth Stood Still	Target Tech	
2008	Cuttin' da Mustard	Rolo	
2009	Fast & Furious	Alex	
2010	Tooth Fairy	Duke	
2010	Percy Jackson and the Lightning Thief	Grover Underwood	
2010	Dark Moon		Short film
2010	Operation: Endgame	Tower	
2010	Lottery Ticket	Benny	
2011	Big Tweet	Big Tweet	Short film
2011	Big Mommas: Like Father, Like Son	Trent Pierce / Charmaine Daisy Pierce	
2012	Thunderstruck	Alan	
2013	Percy Jackson: Sea of Monsters	Grover Underwood	
2013	Approaching Midnight	Corporal Artie "AJ" Culpepper	
2016	Get a Job	Luke	
2016	Eloise	Dell Richards	
2017	The Year of Spectacular Men	Logan	
2017	Izzy Gets the F*ck Across Town	Dick	
2018	A Talent for Trouble	Niles Wellington	
2019	All the Way with You	Malik	
2024	Trap City	DeShawn	
2024	I'm Beginning to See the Light	Sam	

=== Television ===
Year	Title	Role	Notes
1999	The Norm Show	Buster	Episode: "Artie Comes to Town"
2001–2002	The Zeta Project	Blair / Jason Foley	Voice; 2 episodes
2007	Super Sweet 16: The Movie	Brian	Television film
2011	Raising Hope	Justin	Episode: "Romeo and Romeo"
2011	Hail Mary	KZ	Television film
2013	Beverly Hills Cop	Aaron Foley	Unaired pilot
2014	Californication	Hashtag	Recurring cast (season 7)
2014	Drunk History	Robert Smalls	Episode: "Charleston"
2014–2015	Deadbeat	Rufus "Roofie" Jones	Main cast (seasons 1–2)
2015	Mr. Robinson	Ben Robinson	Main cast
2015–2020	BoJack Horseman	Corduroy Jackson-Jackson	Voice; recurring role
2017	Love by the 10th Date	Dante	Television film
2017	Face Value	Team Captain	
2019	Historical Roasts	Barack Obama	Episode: "Martin Luther King Jr."
2025	The Family Business	Marquis Duncan	Guest role
2025	The Family Business: New Orleans	Marquis Duncan	Main role

== Awards and nominations ==
Year	Award	Category	Title	Result
2006	Black Reel Award	Black Reel Award for Best Breakthrough Performance	Roll Bounce	Won
2009	Black Reel Award	Black Reel Award for Best Supporting Actor	Tropic Thunder	Nominated
2011	Black Reel Award	Black Reel Award for Best Supporting Actor	Percy Jackson & the Olympians: The Lightning Thief	Nominated
2012	Golden Raspberry Award	Worst Supporting Actress (as Charmaine)	Big Mommas: Like Father, Like Son	Nominated

== Singles ==
- Imma Do It Big (featuring T-Pain and One Chance)
