= Big Momma's House 2 =

2006 film by John Whitesell

- Theatrical release poster
- Directed by: John Whitesell
- Written by: Don Rhymer
- Based on: Characters by Darryl Quarles
- Produced by: David T. Friendly; Michael Green
- Starring: Martin Lawrence; Nia Long; Emily Procter; Zachary Levi
- Cinematography: Mark Irwin
- Edited by: Priscilla Nedd-Friendly
- Music by: George S. Clinton
- Production companies: Regency Enterprises; Runteldat Entertainment; Firm Films; Deep River Productions; New Regency
- Distributed by: 20th Century Fox
- Release date: January 27, 2006
- Running time: 99 minutes
- Country: United States
- Language: English
- Budget: $40 million
- Box office: $141.5 million

Big Momma's House 2 is a 2006 American crime comedy film, and the second installment of the Big Momma trilogy. The film was directed by John Whitesell and stars Martin Lawrence reprising his role as FBI agent Malcolm Turner, along with Nia Long, Emily Procter and Zachary Levi.

Big Momma's House 2 was released theatrically on January 27, 2006 by 20th Century Fox, and was panned by critics, but was a box-office success, grossing $141.5 million against a budget of $40 million. A further sequel, Big Mommas: Like Father, Like Son, was released in 2011.

== Plot ==
Six years after meeting her during an investigation, FBI agent Malcolm Turner is now married to Sherry Pierce and is the stepfather of her son Trent, and assumes a desk job to be close to her as they await the arrival of their first child.

However, news reaches Malcolm that his friend Doug Hudson was killed, while working undercover in Orange County, California. He learns that he was investigating former military intelligence specialist Tom Fuller, who now works for the National Agenda Software corporation, and had discovered he was creating a computer worm that could provide backdoor access to government databases.

Although Malcolm asks to assist, his boss refuses to let him interfere in the investigation being conducted by agents Liliana Morales and Kevin Keneally. Discovering Morales is sending an agent undercover to secure the job of nanny within Tom's family, Malcolm decides to take advantage of this, lying to Sherry that he must go out-of-state for a conference.

Malcolm retrieves the disguise he used while impersonating Sherry's grandmother - known affectionately as Big Momma - and secures the nanny job by exposing flaws in the other candidates. While he keeps his eyes on Tom, Malcolm learns that the Fuller family has problems: Tom's wife Leah is very strict on chores; eldest daughter Molly seeks to be someone she is not; youngest daughter Carrie strives to do well as a cheerleader; and toddler son Andrew has a strange habit of jumping off of tall objects and falling down.

Although Malcolm finds evidence that Tom is working alongside a notorious hacker, Sherry tracks him down after discovering oversized underwear under their bed and is appalled to discover he is working on another case posing as her grandmother. The matter is then made worse when Morales discover him interfering in her case, and allows him to assist as long as he maintains his cover and retains Kevin as his partner. After Leah threatens to fire Big Momma for her handling of her chores, Malcolm spends the night doing all of the work and successfully wins back her favor.

After an attempt to capture the hacker fails, Malcolm and Kevin recruit assistance from child hacker Stewart to access Fuller's workstation at Agenda. While they secure the means, Malcolm receives a call from a frightened Molly at a nightclub, and goes to find her as Big Momma. Soon after, men working for Agenda's CEO Casal take both of them hostage in order to coerce Tom to assist in a business deal involving the computer worm. Malcolm soon frees the pair before going to rescue Tom, while Molly calls the FBI.

Discovering that Casal plans to kill Tom as part of the deal he made with his customer, Malcolm saves his life and ensures Casal cannot escape before the FBI arrives. Although shocked to discover Malcolm's real identity, Tom is thankful to him when he informs Morales that he was being coerced by his boss under the threat of having his family killed for refusing.

While the case is ended and he has made amends with Sherry, Malcolm decides to stay in California a while longer in order to assist Carrie, after helping her team improve themselves for an upcoming cheerleading championships. Helping them to successfully win, Malcolm departs, leaving behind a letter from Big Momma bidding farewell to the Fullers and hints that their paths will cross again someday. Meanwhile, he resumes his life at home with Sherry, Trent, and their newborn baby boy named Doug.

== Cast ==
- Martin Lawrence as Malcolm Turner / Hattie Mae 'Big Momma' Pierce, an FBI Agent, Sherry's husband and Trent's stepfather
- Nia Long as Sherry Pierce-Turner, Big Momma's granddaughter, Malcolm's wife and Trent's mother who is now pregnant
- Zachary Levi as Agent Kevin Keneally
- Mark Moses as Tom Fuller, Leah's husband and father of their 3 children
- Emily Procter as Leah Fuller, Tom's wife and mother of their 3 children
- Kat Dennings as Molly Fuller, Tom and Leah's elder daughter
- Chloë Grace Moretz as Carrie Fuller, Tom and Leah's middle daughter
- Preston and Trevor Shores as Andrew Fuller, Tom and Leah's younger son
- Marisol Nichols as Agent Liliana Morales
- Jascha Washington as Trent Pierce, Sherry's son and Malcolm's stepson
- Sarah Joy Brown as Agent Constance Stone
- Kevin Durand as Oshima
- Cameron Daddo as Casal
- Christopher Jones as Anthony Bishop
- Josh Flitter as Stewart
- Max Van Ville as Chad
- Rhoda Griffis as Mrs. Gallagher
- Kirk B. R. Woller as Doug Hudson
- Ann Mahoney as Coach Lisa
- Shanna Moakler as Petra
- Andy Stahl as School's Principal
- Lisa Arrindell as Danielle
- Jessica White as Bra Model
- Paige Butcher as Background Model #1

== Reception ==
=== Box office ===
Big Momma's House 2 grossed $27,736,056 in its opening weekend ranking number one. It had the second-highest opening weekend for a Martin Lawrence film at the time, behind Bad Boys II. As of March 3, 2011, the film has grossed a total of $70,165,972 at the United States box office with a worldwide gross of $138,259,062.

=== Critical response ===
On Rotten Tomatoes, the film has an approval rating of 5% based on 73 reviews and an average rating of 3.1/10. The site's critical consensus reads: "Unfunny and unoriginal. In other words, a perfect piece of evidence for opponents of pointless movie sequels". On Metacritic, the film has a score of 34 out of 100 based on 20 critics, indicating "generally unfavorable" reviews. Audiences polled by CinemaScore gave the film an average grade of "A−" on an A+ to F scale.

Brian Lowry of Variety called the film "episodic" and "flat" compared to the original film.

Keith Uhlich of Slant Magazine gave the film 1/2 out of 4 stars.

The film was nominated for a Golden Raspberry Awards in 2006 in the category "Worst Prequel or Sequel", but lost to Basic Instinct 2.

Its poor reception has been lampooned in The Onion.

== Sequel ==
A third and final installment, Big Mommas: Like Father, Like Son, was released on February 18, 2011. Brandon T. Jackson was cast in the role of Trent, who was originally played by Jascha Washington. Nia Long also did not reprise her role, which resulted in her character, Sherry, being written out. Big Mommas: Like Father, Like Son fared worse critical reception than its predecessors, scoring a 5% on Rotten Tomatoes.
