= Micah Stephen Williams =

American former actor (born 1991)

- Born: February 16, 1991 (age 35); Long Beach, California, U.S.
- Other name: Micah S. Williams
- Occupation: Actor
- Years active: 2000–2019

Micah Stephen Williams (born February 16, 1991) is an American former actor, best known for his recurring role as Emmett on the Disney Channel sitcom Good Luck Charlie. Williams began his acting career having a small guest role in the series The Pretender. He went on to guest star in other television series including Grounded for Life, Lizzie McGuire, Joan of Arcadia, In Justice, Just For Kicks and The Office. He had a small role in the 2003 film Bruce Almighty, he also co-starred in the films Like Mike 2: Streetball and Jump In!.

In 2006, he received a Young Artist Award nomination for Best Performance in a TV Movie, Miniseries or Special (Comedy or Drama) - Leading Young Actor in the television film The Ron Clark Story.

== Filmography ==
Year	Title	Role	Notes
2000	The Pretender	Young Boy	Episode: Rules of Engagement
2001	Grounded for Life	Wendell	Episode: Loser
2003	Lizzie McGuire	Student	2 episodes
2003	Bruce Almighty	Boy on Bike	
2004–2005	Joan of Arcadia	Freshman/Nerdy Kid	3 episodes
2006	In Justice	Jordan Wainwright	Pilot
2006	The Ron Clark Story	Julio Vasquez	TV movie
2006	Like Mike 2: Streetball	Nathan Daniels	Direct-to-video film
2007	Jump In!	L'il Earl Jackson	TV movie
2009	The Office	Zion	Episode: Scott's Tots
2010–2014	Good Luck Charlie	Emmett Heglin	Recurring role
2011	Roadies	Mikuh	Recurring role
2015	The Challenger	Boxing Fan	
2019	Snowfall	Homie 1	Episode: Other Lives
