= List of Jessie episodes =

Jessie is an American comedy television series created by Pamela Eells O'Connell that aired on Disney Channel from September 30, 2011 to October 16, 2015. The series stars Debby Ryan, Peyton List, Cameron Boyce, Karan Brar, Skai Jackson, and Kevin Chamberlin.

== Series overview ==
Season	Episodes	Originally released	
Season	Episodes	First released	Last released
1	26	September 30, 2011	September 7, 2012
2	26	October 5, 2012	September 13, 2013
3	26	October 5, 2013	November 28, 2014
4	20	January 9, 2015	October 16, 2015

== Episodes ==
=== Season 1 (2011–12) ===
No. overall	No. in season	Title	Directed by	Written by	Original release date	Prod. code	U.S. viewers (millions)
1	1	"New York, New Nanny"	Bob Koherr	Pamela Eells O'Connell	September 30, 2011	101	4.63
Eighteen-year-old Jessie Prescott is dumped out of her taxi cab after arriving in New York City. Jessie is approached by a doorman named Tony Chiccolini and a seven-year-old girl named Zuri Ross. Zuri asks Jessie to be her new nanny after her current nanny quits. Initially reluctant, Jessie is led up to the penthouse and meets Bertram, the lazy and sarcastic butler of the family. Jessie also meets Zuri's siblings named Emma, Luke, and Ravi. Their parents, famous entrepreneurs Morgan and Christina Ross, hire Jessie. Jessie starts on bad terms with the children: she accidentally destroys Emma's science project, rebuffs Luke's advances, fears Ravi's pet water monitor, and accidentally offends Zuri by telling Zuri that mermaids aren't real. Jessie realizes that the kids miss their absent parents, who fire her when she attempts to open up their minds about the situation. Nevertheless, Jessie attends Emma's science fair, which she wins with a newly refurbished project. Morgan and Christina realize their absence and rehire Jessie, whom the children decide to give another chance. Guest stars: Christina Moore as Christina Ross, Chris Galya as Tony, Brian Carpenter as Head Judge, Bryan Oakes Fuller as A.D., Charles Esten as Morgan Ross
2	2	"The Talented Mr. Kipling"	Bob Koherr	Valerie Ahern & Christian McLaughlin	October 7, 2011	103	4.23
Jessie begins to have recurring nightmares involving Ravi's pet water monitor, Mr. Kipling. Emma and Luke are paired for a photography class project. Jessie decides to take the kids to Central Park so Ravi can walk Mr. Kipling while Emma and Luke work on their project. The children object in order to avoid Mrs. Chesterfield, the self-absorbed neighbor and head of the building condo board. The kids sneak by Chesterfield and, at the park, Zuri begins to be bullied by an imaginary girl named Genevieve. Returning home, Chesterfield spots Mr. Kipling and threatens to take him away. Jessie accidentally breaks Chesterfield's tooth with bribe cookies, having her call animal control. Tony and Zuri keep animal control at bay while Mr. Kipling escapes into Chesterfield's apartment. Chesterfield, Jessie, and Ravi witness Mr. Kipling saving Chesterfield's dog Zeus from an approaching eagle. Chesterfield agrees to let Mr. Kipling stay while Emma and Luke use Mr. Kipling's rescue as the shot for their project; Emma later attacks Luke when he gets the credit for taking the photo. Guest stars: Chris Galya as Tony, Carolyn Hennesy as Mrs. Chesterfield
3	3	"Used Karma"	Bob Koherr	Teleplay by : Chris Kula & Eric Schaar; Story by : Silvia Olivas	October 14, 2011	102	3.92
While Ravi and Mr. Kipling watch a scary movie, Luke appears in a scary costume and chases the two away. Later, Ravi appears duct taped to his bedroom door while in a sleeping bag and, fed up with Luke's pranks, warns him that karma will take its toll. Meanwhile, Emma deduces that Tony is falling in love with Jessie. Jessie doubts this, but Tony asks her to lunch in Central Park. Jessie believes that her "casual" wardrobe will draw Tony away, but this fails to work. Meanwhile, Ravi sets up a set of pranks to get back at Luke. Believing this to be bad karma for his pranks, Luke seeks out Ravi's help to get rid of this "karma". In order to get rid of his "karma", Luke must perform tasks, ending with a karma wash out in the rain. When Jessie returns from her date, she accidentally maces Tony when she believes he is going to kiss her. Returning to the penthouse, Jessie lets Luke back inside, who believes that he is now Karma free. Later, as the family is watching a movie in the screening room, Bertram appears in a scary costume and scares them away, gaining the room for himself. Guest star: Chris Galya as Tony
4	4	"Zombie Tea Party 5"	Shelley Jensen	Adam Lapidus	October 21, 2011	104	4.03
After Jessie embarrasses Luke in front of a bully, he does not want her to help him with anything in public. When the mean child faces off with Luke in the neighborhood paintball contest, Luke has no one to be his partner. Upset, Jessie arrives at the park to prove to Luke that she can help him win the paintball contest. Meanwhile, Zuri invites Emma to her B.Y.O.B. (Bring Your Own Boa) tea party, but Emma turns down the invitation when her friend Jasmine gives her a free pass to a fashion show. However, when Emma is ready for the fashion show, Jasmine gives the passes to the Olsen Twins, so Bertram insists that Emma spend the day with Zuri after he had been the unwanted guest at the tea party for the last part of the episode. Guest stars: Ava Penner as Jasmine Epstein, Devan Leos as Trevor
5	5	"One Day Wonders"	Phill Lewis	Douglas Tuber & Tim Maile	October 28, 2011	105	3.93
Jessie practices her guitar skills and plays in Central Park. People notice her and give her money. While she plays, Luke hip-hops and they find out that they earn more money that way. After J.J. Mayfield, a music producer, spots Luke and Jessie performing in the park, he promises them fame and gets them to his studio to shoot a music video. However, Jessie and Luke have to pay $1,200 in order to make the music video and produce it. During the shooting of the music video, they fight over the spotlight, causing problems. Meanwhile, Bertram enlists Emma to help "style" him for his social network profile photo, but things get out of hand when Bertram finds out he can edit his photo to look thinner. Bertram only signed up for the social messaging site to meet an old high school crush. In the end, it turns out that she had around four children and wanted to have more. Meanwhile, Zuri and Ravi take Tony's place at the reception desk to prove to Tony that his job is not as hard as he makes it seem, but after throwing up in someone's grocery bag and dealing with cookie peddlers, they decide that maybe it was too much for the two of them to handle. Guest stars: Chris Galya as Tony, Arvie Lowe Jr. as J.J. Mayfield
6	6	"Zuri's New Old Friend"	Leonard R. Garner, Jr.	Sally Lapiduss & Erin Dunlap	November 4, 2011	107	4.45
Jessie gets worried that Zuri may have imaginary friends her whole life, so she tries to find her an actual friend at the park. Zuri meets their neighbor, Mrs. Arthur, but she arrives at the penthouse in character as "Nana Banana", a former clown with a colorful personality. Zuri begins to favor Nana over Jessie. Jealous, Jessie throws Nana out after a banana peel is left on the stairs, which upsets Zuri. Meanwhile, Mr. Kipling falls in love with a plastic toy animal at the park, so Luke, Emma, and Ravi steal it from the park while trying to avoid Ranger Bill, the nearly-blind park security guard. In the end, they get caught, but Nana Banana smooth talks the rough and burly park security guard. Guest stars: JoAnne Worley as Nana Banana, Ronnie Schell as Ranger Bill
7	7	"Creepy Connie Comes a Callin'"	Phill Lewis	Eric Schaar & David J. Booth	November 18, 2011	109	4.23
Jessie believes that Connie, a math tutor she finds for Luke, will be the perfect influence, not realizing that Connie is obsessed with Luke. Connie asks Luke to a Harry Potter dance and Jessie forces him to accept. Jessie soon realizes that Connie really is a creepy stalker. Meanwhile, Ravi is convinced that he can predict the future with his Mystical iBall application on his tablet. Zuri does not believe him at first, but after asking a question that gave her an unpredictable answer (Mr. Kipling destroying her pet pony stuffed animal), Zuri finally agrees with Ravi's Mystical iBall application. Once these younger Ross siblings hear of terrible predictions about Bertram's fate from the Mystical iBall, they try and convince Bertram to stay alert. Guest star: Sierra McCormick as Connie Absent: Peyton List as Emma Ross
8	8	"Christmas Story"	Phill Lewis	Pamela Eells O'Connell	December 9, 2011	106	4.01
The Ross children are beyond excited for their parents' arrival; they make sure the house is decorated to perfection. Meanwhile, Ravi has never heard of Santa, so Zuri explains who he is, except that she makes him sound like he is a judgmental spy who feasts on children. When Christina and Morgan cannot make it because they got caught in a snowstorm, it is up to Jessie and Bertram to bring the Christmas spirit to the children. Guest stars: Christina Moore as Christina Ross, Debbie Lee Carrington as Jingles, Adam Kulbersh as Clerk, Charles Esten as Morgan Ross
9	9	"Star Wars"	Bob Koherr	Tim Maile & Douglas Tuber	January 6, 2012	114	7.32
Celebrity actor Jordan Taylor comes to stay at the Ross household. Jessie and Emma fight for his affection, while Luke and Zuri make prank phone calls on his phone. Bertram pretends to work while Morgan Ross is in town. Even though Morgan tells everyone not to tell people that Jordan is staying at the Ross penthouse, Emma tries to ruin Jessie's date with Jordan, disobeying her father's orders. Guest stars: Chris Galya as Tony, Mike Owen as Gus, Lachlan Buchanan as Jordan Taylor, Charles Esten as Morgan Ross
10	10	"Are You Cooler than a Fifth Grader?"	Kevin Chamberlin	Valerie Ahern & Christian McLaughlin	January 20, 2012	111	3.33
After Zuri's doll is ruined, she and Jessie attempt to raise two-hundred dollars for a new one, despite attempts on being stopped by a cop and Mrs. Chesterfield. Meanwhile, Ravi starts as the new student in Luke and Emma's school, though Luke expects him to act normal on his first day. Despite trying to fit in, Ravi's first unexpected attempt to embarrass Luke led him to lie to his friends about Ravi (Luke's "dad's friend's cousin's dog's neighbor") because of his geeky cricket uniform. Luckily, Ravi helps stop a school bully when he has him eat one of his dragon fire peppers. Guest stars: Carolyn Hennesy as Mrs. Rhoda Chesterfield, Jace Norman as Finch, Brandon James as Dale
11	11	"Take the A Train... I Think?"	Sean McNamara	Adam Lapidus	January 27, 2012	110	3.43
Jessie notices that Emma is constantly doing her homework at the last minute; now she is doing the same for her social studies report, which makes Jessie scold her just like her dad would do back at the military base. As she tries to take the children to the Battery Park, they get lost and have a wild subway adventure, with first taking the uptown train to Yorkville, then taking a downtown train to Chinatown and then the uptown train. Meanwhile, back at the penthouse, Luke starts break-dancing again, but he hears a scream coming from the kitchen. It turns out to be Bertram, who falls unconscious at the sight of a poisonous spider called the speckled recluse (according to Bertram, the "deadliest spider on the planet"), so both of them try to get rid of it by using their "winging-it" ideas (mostly Luke's), leading them to their final plan. In the end, Emma finishes her homework using the experiences in the adventure while Luke and Bertram end up with hundreds of spider babies from the eggs that the speckled recluse laid. Guest star: Torsten Voges as Fritz
12	12	"Romancing the Crone"	Bob Koherr	Valerie Ahern & Christian McLaughlin	February 10, 2012	112	2.92
While shooting a video to show to one of her friends back in Texas, Jessie puts on an expensive tiara that Morgan bought for Christina when they got married. While shooting the video on the terrace, she accidentally drops the tiara into Mrs. Chesterfield's pool. Mrs. Chesterfield does not give the tiara back when asked and threatens to tell Morgan and Christina that Jessie was using it. To distract Mrs. Chesterfield, Jessie forces Bertram to ask Mrs. Chesterfield out on a date. Guest star: Carolyn Hennesy as Mrs. Rhoda Chesterfield
13	13	"The Princess and the Pea Brain"	Bob Koherr	Pamela Eells O'Connell	February 24, 2012	113	3.11
Normally, Jessie reads Zuri a bedtime story, but this time Zuri tells the story to Jessie, which soon places all of them into a medieval world. Peasant Tony will do anything to please Princess Jessie, though he is going against another guy fighting for her, who is supposed to represent a rich guy named Brody in the real world. In the real world, a guy named Brody asks Jessie out on a date, which actually causes Tony to become jealous. Guest stars: Chris Galya as Tony, Ben Bledsoe as Brody Hinton
14	14	"World Wide Web of Lies"	Leonard R. Garner, Jr.	Sally Lapiduss & Erin Dunlap	March 9, 2012	108	3.23
Jessie competes with another nanny named Agatha, who forbids her from taking the Ross children to Central Park. Agatha writes on her blog, Toddler Tattler, about Jessie and what a bad nanny she is by posting pictures of Jessie brushing dirt off of Zuri's rear end and twists the truth to make it seem like Jessie is spanking Zuri. However, it was libel since the picture was taken by Agatha herself when Zuri fell in the dirt. Jessie attempts to prevent Christina from discovering the existence of the blog but Christina eventually finds out. She believes Jessie's side of the story and helps her with Agatha by threatening to publicly shame her online unless she takes down the blog. Meanwhile, at the penthouse, Bertram is sick and tired of Luke and Ravi constantly "nurpling" each other, so he teaches them a lesson by teaching them how to wrestle. Guest stars: Christina Moore as Christina Ross, Jennifer Veal as Agatha, Max Charles as Axel, Julie Meyer as Fiona Absent: Peyton List as Emma Ross
15	15	"The Kid Whisperer"	Bob Koherr	Sally Lapiduss	March 30, 2012	115	2.29
Jessie thinks Luke needs strict discipline to keep him from misbehaving and enlists the help of a fellow nanny, Samantha, who turns out to be a dog trainer. Meanwhile, to retrieve their stolen belongings, Emma, Ravi, and Zuri break into Bertram's room, where his habit of hoarding is revealed. Jessie makes them help clean it up. Guest star: Maia Madison as Samantha
16	16	"Glue Dunnit: A Sticky Situation"	Victor Gonzalez	Valerie Ahern & Christian McLaughlin	April 13, 2012	118	3.02
When Mrs. Chesterfield's hands get stuck to her head because her hair gel is switched with glue, she accuses all of the Ross children. Meanwhile, Tony and Jessie attempt to go on a date, but in all of the chaos, they miss their dinner reservation, movie, and carriage ride. At the end, Jessie apologizes to Tony for them missing their third first date. Ravi plays the part of a detective along with Mr. Kipling. In the end, Mrs. Chesterfield's pet chihuahua, Zeus, is revealed as the culprit. Guest stars: Carolyn Hennesy as Mrs. Rhoda Chesterfield, Chris Galya as Tony
17	17	"Badfellas"	Victor Gonzalez	Eric Schaar & David J. Booth	April 27, 2012	120	3.07
Emma has a huge crush on a bad boy named Vincent; after an awkward encounter, they start dating. Jessie is excited to meet Emma's new boyfriend, but when they do meet, Jessie is thrown off-guard because he is nothing like what she expected. Jessie believes that he is a bad influence on Emma. Meanwhile, Zuri plants a tree in Central Park for her project and becomes way too overprotective of it. Guest stars: Garrett Backstrom as Vincent, Joey Richter as Officer Petey
18	18	"Beauty & the Beasts"	Phill Lewis	Pamela Eells O'Connell	May 4, 2012	122	2.62
Zuri enters the Little Miss Big Apple competition against Lindsay, a child who Agatha is watching. When Jessie finds out that Zuri has no talent, she insists that Zuri lip syncs as her talent. When Zuri plans to cheat on her schoolwork, Jessie apologizes for teaching her that cheating seemed all right. Zuri ends up doing an acting scene, but when she and Lindsay do not win, Jessie and Agatha both end up paying the losing part of their bet. Both the nannies end up hanging upside down in monkey suits at Central Park, but when Zuri and Emma want to see how long they can stay there, they leave them there for longer than their bet said to. Meanwhile, Luke helps Ravi with his science project, which leads them to experiment on Bertram. When Bertram finds out about their little "plan", he tries getting back at them by pretending to receive chest pain in order to scare them both. In the end, Luke and Ravi learn their lesson. Guest stars: Jennifer Veal as Nanny Agatha, Nikki Hahn as Lindsay
19	19	"Evil Times Two"	Bob Koherr	Adam Lapidus	May 11, 2012	116	2.93
Agatha's twin sister, Angela, visits. After Agatha refuses to let her stay in her apartment, Jessie tells her she can stay at the Ross household. Angela (a contrast to the cynical, rude Agatha) is seemingly sweet at first but Jessie slowly begins to suspects that she is trying to steal her job and turn the kids away from her. Meanwhile, Emma is horrified when a huge pimple grows on her nose, but it goes away thanks to a non-organic cream Angela made. Guest stars: Chris Galya as Tony, Jennifer Veal as Agatha/Angela
20	20	"Tempest in a Teacup"	Victor Gonzalez	Sally Lapiduss & Erin Dunlap	June 8, 2012	119	3.25
Ravi and Luke are flying a model helicopter when it flies into a giant teacup on a billboard. Ravi, Luke, and Bertram also get stuck in the teacup trying to rescue the helicopter. Meanwhile, Jessie and Tony go on their fourth date and try to make it perfect because of their previous three dates all going wrong and because of Jessie's bad experience with a previous prom date. Emma and Zuri help plan the date/prom make-up by doing an under the sea theme for the date. Jessie and Tony end up getting stuck in the giant teacup billboard. When Jessie gets soaking wet, just like her last prom date, it sets their course for a fiasco, but Tony considers her beautiful, no matter how she looks, and kisses her. The episode ends with them dancing the night away in the giant teacup, where Bertram, Luke, and Ravi also are because they are stuck. Guest star: Chris Galya as Tony
21	21	"A Doll's Outhouse"	Phill Lewis	Valerie Ahern & Christian McLaughlin	June 22, 2012	121	3.75
After watching a scary movie about dolls called "Betty Die Time", Zuri refuses to sleep in her room again. Jessie tells her to face her fear, revealing her own fear as well: Porta-Potties. Meanwhile, Luke teaches Ravi how to impress a girl from his biology class, not yet realizing that Tanya has a crush on Luke, not Ravi, after she gives him a rib-cracking hug. Ignoring the context, Ravi is angry and upset because he thinks Luke betrayed him by "moving in on his woman" and challenges his brother to an unnecessary duel two hours later. During all of that mayhem, Bertram attempts to enter an opera contest to win a long vacation to Italy. While Luke and Ravi hit each other with large bread sticks, Bertram finds out that he did win, but not a vacation to Italy. After Luke "grinds" Ravi with sausage, Luke tells him what really happened two hours ago in Central Park and Ravi apologizes for not believing him in the first place. Finally, Emma solemnly tells Tanya that she would rather end up as an old maid with lots of cats than continue being her friend. In the end, after receiving weird dreams about their greatest fears, Zuri and Jessie successfully conquer them. Guest star: Gracie Kaufman as Tanya Weston
22	22	"We Are So Grounded"	Eric Dean Seaton	Valerie Ahern & Christian McLaughlin	July 13, 2012	124	3.67
Jessie, Bertram, and the children head to Bali for a family vacation, but when their private jet starts to experience difficulties, Jessie takes control of the cockpit and makes an emergency landing on a tropical island. Jessie must figure out how to get the children home safely, all while recovering from a poisonous bug bite, escaping scary monsters and tracking down Mr. Kipling. When Jessie receives a bug bite, it makes her insane and Emma tries to cure her with a spork. Meanwhile, Luke warns Bertram and Zuri about "monsters" living on this mysterious island. Luke and Zuri try to find Ravi to run away while Ravi pleads with Mr. Kipling to go back with him. Jessie finds the children in a small hut nearby and finds out that there is no monster after all, just an insane biologist in an insect mask. When Emma finally navigates a helicopter to come and rescue her family, Jessie is relieved and the children hop on. Ravi is so heartbroken without his pet that he decides to stay on the island until Mr. Kipling returns to him. In the end, Jessie and Emma find out that Bertram's cooked bird had babies before it was roasted. Guest star: Eric Petersen as Dr. Cyrus Van Adams
23	23	"Creepy Connie's Curtain Call"	Leonard R. Garner, Jr.	Adam Lapidus	July 26, 2012	123	3.51
Jessie directs a play she has written by herself at the children's school and because she thinks Luke has acting potential, she casts him as the leading male role. However, the play is a love story where the leading female role gets to kiss Luke and Connie is trying to get all the girls away from getting the leading female role so she can end up being the leading female role in order to kiss Luke. In the end, Connie stops trying to get Luke to like her and ends up going out with Ravi instead. Meanwhile, Zuri job-shadows Bertram for her school report. Unfortunately, Zuri believes that being a butler is an easy job and competes with Bertram, which upsets him. In the end, Bertram becomes touched about how Zuri cares about him so much that she thinks of him as her friend. Guest star: Sierra McCormick as Connie
24	24	"Cattle Calls & Scary Walls"	Leonard R. Garner, Jr.	Sally Lapiduss & Erin Dunlap	August 10, 2012	126	3.35
Jessie leaves Emma in charge of Luke and Ravi as Emma helps her brothers search for what they think are strange noises coming from the dumbwaiter shaft. Ravi attempts to go forth and search for this mysterious creature, shocking him once he finds it. When Ravi does not return to the kitchen for quite a while, Luke dresses up like Indiana Jones to go and search for him, but they are terrified when they find a load of animal bones and it gets dark. Emma also tries to help, but gets herself lost in the walls, making Luke finally explode in fury. Apparently, it turns out that the strange noise is Manny the Mongoose, Mr. Kipling's chew toy, and that the shafts are where he gets rid of the indigestible bones of his bread. Mr. Kipling then leads Emma, Luke, and Ravi out of the shafts into Ravi's room. Meanwhile, Jessie auditions for a role on a television show, yet Zuri is the one who impresses the director instead. Jealous and angry that she did not get the part, Jessie tries to squirm herself into the spotlight, thus creating a Ross diva instead of fulfilling her acting dream. The producer gets mad and fires Zuri and Jessie. Guest stars: Joey Richter as Officer Petey, Stacy Chbosky as Director Absent: Kevin Chamberlin as Bertram
25	25	"Gotcha Day"	Victor Gonzalez	David J. Booth & Eric Schaar	August 24, 2012	117	4.44
While the Ross family has their traditional "Gotcha Day", Jessie is left in charge to help celebrate the time when Zuri was first welcomed home in New York City. When Ravi tells the story when he first arrived in the United States, he tells Jessie that they thought Mr. Kipling was supposed to be a baby because his room was decorated like a nursery. Jessie accidentally blurts out that Morgan and Christina were probably expecting a baby instead of him. Ravi then gets incredibly upset and Christina and Morgan get mad at Jessie. The huge reveal almost ruins "Gotcha Day". Later on, Morgan and Christina tells them that his birth certificate had a typo and instead of Ravi being born in the year 2001, it said 2011, so that is why the Rosses assumed that they were expecting a baby. Ravi forgives Morgan and Christina for the mishap and they give Zuri a zebra as a "Gotcha Day" present. Guest stars: Christina Moore as Christina Ross, Cienna Salles-Cunha as 4 Year Old Emma, Sawyer Ever as Toddler Luke, Charles Esten as Morgan Ross
26	26	"The Secret Life of Mr. Kipling"	Eric Dean Seaton	Pamela Eells O'Connell	September 7, 2012	125	3.59
Mr. Kipling has been acting strange for some time. He is mean to Ravi and has been having weird food cravings. It is revealed that Mr. Kipling is a female lizard guarding her twelve babies and this startles the entire Ross family. Meanwhile, Zuri is upset when she announces that Millie the Mermaid has died (she got stabbed by a swordfish and Zuri thinks it was murder). The mailman accidentally ships Mr. Kipling's eggs to a restaurant. Jessie, Ravi, and Luke pretend to be waiters and try to get them back. At the restaurant, the eggs hatch and twelve little lizards are born. The episode ends with the entire family, including a tearful Bertram, attending Millie the Mermaid's funeral. Guest star: Travis Wester as Chef Rolando

=== Season 2 (2012–13) ===
No. overall	No. in season	Title	Directed by	Written by	Original release date	Prod. code	U.S. viewers (millions)
27	1	"The Whining"	Rich Correll	Eric Schaar & David J. Booth	October 5, 2012	201	3.58
Rumors arise of a man named Grimm Holloran, a doorman with a strange personality. Grimm warns the Ross children not to trick-or-treat on the 13th floor because there are dangers beyond understanding. Too brave and cocky to believe in such words, Luke decides to trick-or-treat on the 13th floor with Zuri, despite Emma and Ravi's deep fear of Grimm's warning. Meanwhile, Jessie plans to submit her story to a famous newspaper journalist. Unfortunately, her abnormal tactics and her sleep deprivation cause the Ross children to believe that she is a bloodthirsty maniac waiting to kill off anyone in her path. Tony tries to calm them down throughout the episode, but to no avail. Guest stars: Meshach Taylor as Grimm Hallorann, Chris Galya as Tony, Karsen Skinner as Spooky Twin #1, Kendel Skinner as Spooky Twin #2
28	2	"Green-Eyed Monsters"	Rich Correll	Valerie Ahern & Christian McLaughlin	October 26, 2012	202	2.67
Mrs. Kipling's baby lizards have brought a lot of chaos in the Ross household. Ravi has barely gotten any sleep and he is constantly tired. He contracts Zuri as his part-time nanny in order to help him with the babies. Unfortunately, this causes a rift of trust between these two siblings. Meanwhile, Jessie and Tony go out on a date which Officer Petey crashes, much to Tony's dismay. Later, Jessie joins a comedy improvise class alongside Petey. Tony is jealous because she is spending a lot of time with him, so he asks Emma to help him discover if Jessie is cheating on him by spying. Guest stars: Chris Galya as Tony, Joey Richter as Officer Petey, Kevin Michael Martin as Malcolm
29	3	"Make New Friends but Hide the Old"	Phill Lewis	Sally Lapiduss & Erin Dunlap	November 2, 2012	203	3.22
It is the beginning of the school year; Jessie and Bertram could not be happier. On Emma's first day of high school, she meets a rude, aggressive girl named Rosie. To Emma's dismay, they are assigned to do an art project together and Rosie ends up embarrassing her. Meanwhile, Luke searches through his backpack and Kenny the Koala accidentally falls out. Random bullies witness the incident and laugh at him. Ravi takes the blame in order to leave Luke off the hook; unfortunately, they start teasing him instead. Elsewhere, Zuri is upset because she has just started third grade and her homework is more difficult, so she refuses to do it. Feeling guilty and upset, Rosie attempts to apologize to Emma for embarrassing her, Luke reveals to everyone at Walden Academy Middle School that he owns Kenny, not Ravi, as the brothers kindly embrace and Zuri reveals why she did not complete her homework, forcing Jessie to cheer her up. Guest stars: Kelly Gould as Rosie, Amy Farrington as Ms. Devlin, Shanna Strong as Shelby, Evan Roe as Billy
30	4	"101 Lizards"	Bob Koherr	Sally Lapiduss & Erin Dunlap	November 9, 2012	205	3.02
When Ravi realizes he cannot possibly take care of his twelve baby lizards, Jessie persuades him to give them up for adoption. After Ravi interviews many people, he does not approve because he wants to find the lizards good parents. Finally, a woman named Cassandra is interviewed and mentions how her boss is going to take them upstate to a loving home. Jessie and Ravi are horrified when they discover that Cassandra's boss is Ms. Chesterfield. After a few misunderstandings, Jessie and the children are convinced that Ms. Chesterfield is turning the lizards into accessories, so they embark on a journey to rescue the lizards. As it turns out, Mrs. Chesterfield was actually going to have Mrs. Kipling's babies live in her lizard sanctuary. Guest stars: Carolyn Hennesy as Mrs. Rhoda Chesterfield, Laura Spencer as Cassandra
31	5	"Trashin' Fashion"	Phill Lewis	Valerie Ahern & Christian McLaughlin	November 30, 2012	204	2.56
Christina returns to promote her new retro-80s clothing line, Fersher Couture, at the same time Emma's new anonymous fashion blog, Kitty Couture, is trending. When Emma looks at her over-the-top designs, she does not want to give her mother an honest review in order to spare Christina's feelings. Meanwhile, Luke and Ravi compete to impress international supermodel, Diamond Bloodworth. Elsewhere, since Jessie is working as Christina's assistant, Bertram takes over the duty of being the nanny and watches over Zuri. When Zuri finds out Bertram cannot ride a bike, she becomes determined to teach him how to ride a bike. Guest stars: Christina Moore as Christina Ross, Kelly Gould as Rosie, True O'Brien as Diamond Bloodworth
32	6	"Austin & Jessie & Ally All Star New Year" "Nanny in Miami"	Bob Koherr	Wayne Conley & Mike Montesano & Ted Zizik	December 7, 2012	207	4.81
Emma is beyond excited when she finds out that Austin Moon is performing at Times Square. On New Year's Eve, Jessie takes her to see Austin and to their luck, they bump into him, and meet the rest of the gang: Ally, Trish, and Dez. Plus, Jessie comes up with a brilliant plan on how to get Austin to perform on time. Later on, the gang shows up at their apartment, and Emma tells Jessie that if she helps them, he could record one of her songs and turn it into a big hit. When Ally reads Jessie's lyrics, she thinks they are not good, so Jessie accidentally steals Zuri's poem and takes credit for it. In the end, when Austin and Jessie are about to perform in Miami, she gives Zuri credit, and everybody is satisfied with Dez' impressive music video. Guest star: Richard Whiten as Jimmy Starr Note: This is a combined double-length special episode. The opening credits sequence is a combination of the opening credits sequences of Jessie and Austin & Ally, presenting the main cast from both series with the theme songs and visuals from both series interweaved.
33	7	"The Trouble with Jessie" "The Trouble with Tessie"	Bob Koherr	David J. Booth & Eric Schaar	January 11, 2013	206	3.29
Jessie is worried that Tony will propose after he invites her out for a special evening to meet his parents, so she drags Zuri and her new friend, Stuart to the dinner to keep him from doing anything romantic. Meanwhile, Stuart develops a huge crush on Zuri and she gets annoyed by him. Elsewhere, Emma and Bertram compete with Luke and Ravi to see who really owns the Ross screening room. Sadly, this causes a rift of trust between the pairs as they all seek revenge on each other. Luke and Ravi wind up trapped outside on the terrace, barely surviving and almost freezing to death. Emma and Bertram end up trapped in a rope net and Zuri tries to help them down with some children's scissors to cut the rope lines and says that it takes hours to cut paper with it. Guest stars: Chris Galya as Tony, J.J. Totah as Stuart Wooten, Sandra Purpuro as Carmella Chicolini, Jimmy Smagula as Angelo Chicolini
34	8	"Say Yes to the Messy Dress"	Kevin Chamberlin	Adam Lapidus	January 18, 2013	208	3.09
Jessie introduces the children to Miami Heat player Chris Bosh, who is going to be playing the New York Knicks. In order for the Knicks to win, Luke washes out the luck of Chris' socks so he loses. Later on, Chris starts to lose his skills in basketball, much to Luke's dismay. Meanwhile, a famous fashion designer sends Emma a dress to review on her fashion blog; however, things go awry when Jessie accidentally damages the dress. Guest star: Chris Bosh as himself
35	9	"Teacher's Pest"	Shannon Flynn	Sally Lapiduss & Erin Dunlap	February 1, 2013	210	3.84
Zuri is having problems with her teacher, Ms. Falkenberg, so Jessie decides to volunteer as the classroom aide. Jessie tries to become the teacher's pet, but accidentally ends up becoming her best friend by untruthfully saying that she plays Muggle Quidditch. Now, Jessie has to go along with it in order for Zuri to do better in school. Meanwhile, Ravi has issues with Mrs. Kipling, causing him to crash in Luke's room for indefinite days. Worried about Ravi's self-being and sanity, Luke enlists Emma and Bertram to help him get rid of Ravi by insulting Mrs. Kipling. Special guest star: Cheri Oteri as Ms. Falkenberg
36	10	"Jessie's Big Break"	Bob Koherr	Adam Lapidus	February 15, 2013	299	3.95
Jessie gets her big break as a stunt double to famous Australian actress Shaylee Michaels and the two become instant friends. Chaos ensues when the movie's director and Shaylee's boyfriend, McD, starts flirting with Jessie. McD turns Shaylee against Jessie by saying that Jessie lied about her acting track record and that she was making the move on him. Luckily for Jessie, Luke records McD flirting with Jessie and Jessie and Shaylee become friends again. Meanwhile, Emma and Ravi help sneak Zuri's pet zebra into the penthouse, but after they get caught, they also end up losing Mrs. Kipling. Now, they must set out and save Mrs. Kipling from the maniacal zoo caretaker Ms. Lumpkey. Guest stars: Maia Mitchell as Shaylee Michaels, John DeLuca as McD, Suzanne Krull as Mildred Lumpkey Note: This is a double-length special episode.
37	11	"Pain in the Rear Window"	Bob Koherr	Adam Lapidus	March 1, 2013	209	3.21
After Luke injures his leg dancing, he stays home and miss the school carnival. Since he is wheelchair-ridden, he stays on the terrace of the penthouse and notices a suspicious figure dressed in black at the carnival. Concerned, Luke enlists Emma's help to find out who the shadowy figure is. They think it is Agatha in a clown costume, but it turns out to be Bertram. Meanwhile, Jessie is confused on why people keep winning at her booth, so she vows to get to the bottom of the situation. Guest stars: Jennifer Veal as Nanny Agatha, Joey Richter as Officer Petey
38	12	"Toy Con"	Bob Koherr	Michelle McGee & Rick Williams	March 8, 2013	212	3.60
Emma and Luke teach Bertram how to salsa dance in order to impress the building's chef, Salma Espinoza, but Bertram's confidence gets hold of him. However, Luke and Emma are determined to teach Bertram. Meanwhile, Zuri trades Jessie's childhood doll for a bunny that gives chocolate. Angry and upset, Jessie ignores Zuri until she apologizes, with Ravi gloating. The trio comes up with a plan to retrieve Jessie's doll. At Central Park, Bertram dances with Salma happily after gaining his confidence back, but leaves him again when he notices the judges staring at him. Emma pleads Bertram to look inside of himself and say that he can do it. Luke shows off his dancing skills with Salma as his current partner. In the end, Emma and Luke win the trophy as the best salsa dancers at Central Park. Elsewhere, Jessie retrieves her precious doll and hugs Zuri with Ravi smiling. Guest stars: Stephanie Beatriz as Salma Espinoza, Sam Pancake as Simon Sneed
39	13	"To Be Me or Not to Be Me"	Bob Koherr	Pamela Eells O'Connell	April 5, 2013	211	3.72
A package arrives for Ravi with a bell in it. He claims the bell has magical powers. When Zuri and Jessie are both holding the bell amidst a struggle during an argument, it causes them to switch bodies. Then Emma and Luke switch bodies under similar circumstances and then Ravi and Bertram switch bodies. The body transfers result in many problems; Emma needs to be back in her own body to shoot her Kitty Couture web show and Luke doesn't like Emma acting feminine in his body. When Ravi and Bertram switch bodies, Ravi gets freaked out as Bertram is obsessed with having hair and keeps stroking it. Zuri acts very childish while in Jessie's body and Jessie has trouble getting Zuri to listen to her, especially since Jessie has her first big acting role in play and needs Zuri to cooperate. During "Jessie's" performance, Ravi realizes everyone was arguing when they switched bodies; to switch back, they must say positive affirmations about one another while holding the bell. He and Bertram switch back and then Jessie runs the bell up to Zuri onstage. After everything is seeemingly remedied, Ravi claims he destroyed the bell, but at the end of the episode it appears Mrs. Kipling and Jessie have now switched bodies. It is revealed that the entire episode was just Mrs. Kipling's dream and she wakes up just as soon as the package actually arrives. Guest star: Robert Picardo as Cyril Lipton
40	14	"Why Do Foils Fall in Love?"	Rich Correll	Mike Montesano & Ted Zizik	April 19, 2013	214	2.94
Jessie and Tony's first anniversary is coming up and Jessie wants to write him a song in which she expresses how much he means to her. However, when she thinks he has forgotten it, she writes an angry song and uploads it on Emma's video blog and it becomes a hit. The next day Jessie gets invited to do a concert at the park, but finds out that she got the date wrong and Tony gets tickets to the concert Jessie is playing at, so she has Emma stall him. Unfortunately, he ends up at the concert, but Jessie is able to tell him she loves him and plays the song she originally intended to sing him. Ravi has consistently poor grades in physical education; therefore, Luke, who is very good at sports, lets him win in a competition to build his confidence. However, Ravi gains a little too much self-confidence. It turns out that Jessie was the one who mixed up the anniversary. Guest stars: Chris Galya as Tony, Lauren Pritchard as Coach Penny
41	15	"Kids Don't Wanna Be Shunned"	Rich Correll	Erin Dunlap & Sally Lapiduss	April 26, 2013	215	2.78
Emma is upset when her friends start to hang around with royally-acclaimed new girl Bryn. Luke chooses to do his multicultural project on India and tricks Ravi into doing his whole project for him. Ravi gets his revenge by re-writing the project and making Luke look like a fool in front of the whole school, but feels bad and helps him recover from his stumble. Since all her friends are busy, Jessie takes Emma to the movies and bumps into her friends with Bryn. While trying to be the bigger person, Emma is teased by Bryn. Jessie finally puts a stop to it after insulting her. A big food fight ensues when the entire movie theater learns that Bryn is not royalty. During the fight, Rosie, one of Emma's friends, "takes" a bunch of nachos by Bryn, which was aimed for Emma. In the end, Emma invites the rest of her friends (including Rosie) over to watch a movie and Zuri tries to tag along. Guest stars: Kelly Gould as Rosie, Katherine McNamara as Bryn Breitbart
42	16	"All the Knight Moves"	Shannon Flynn	Mike Montesano & Ted Zizik	May 3, 2013	219	3.08
After Jessie and Ravi discover that Zuri is a chess prodigy, Jessie enters Zuri into a chess competition where she can win two tickets for a trip to Paris. Meanwhile, while watching a show about unsolved crimes, Luke and Emma start to believe that Bertram is the scuba bandit and try to prove this. However, Bertram finds out and forces them to be his crime assistants. In the end, Zuri throws the match so that her opponent can go home to Paris to see his family and make amends and Luke and Emma discover that Bertram is not really the Scuba Bandit, he was just pretending to get back at them for believing that he was. However, when they're watching the show again, they start to believe that Jessie is the sweetheart thief as the episode ends. Guest star: Patrick Kerr as Clement Brulee
43	17	"We Don't Need No Stinkin' Badges"	Shannon Flynn	Pamela Eells O'Connell	June 7, 2013	223	3.75
Jessie wants to prove that she is a great girl scout leader by helping Zuri earn her badges. Emma is also in the troop, but the leader finds out Emma's badges are fake and she really bought the badges online. Jessie makes Emma help Zuri earn her badges. Meanwhile, Luke convinces Ravi that lying is a super power. Ravi then lies to Bertram about who was responsible for putting a cricket in his lobster bisque. When asked who the assailant was, Ravi gives Bertram an ambiguous description, but Bertram assumes it was his rival, Nigel Pettigrew. Bertram and Nigel have a fight with feather-dusters and Nigel wins. At the last minute, Ravi tells the truth, and Bertram tells him that he was disappointed in him. Jessie, Emma, and Zuri get ready to sleep when Coach Penny gets attacked by an ostrich. Zuri saves her, which then allows her to get a badge. The ostrich attacks Bertram when he finds the orange that Zuri threw. Guest stars: Lauren Pritchard as Coach Penny, Oliver Muirhead as Nigel Pettigrew, Marlowe Peyton as Madge
44	18	"Somebunny's in Trouble"	Amanda Bearse	Pamela Eells O'Connell	June 21, 2013	221	3.04
Emma falls for a cute boy named Brett Summers. But he loves sports and Emma does not know anything about sports. So Luke helps her and sits behind the chair and texts Emma what to say. Then Brett finds out and then he forgives her. Then they play a game and then he leaves and tells her that he is studying. But he really went to the screening room with Luke. Then Emma gets mad and breaks up with him. Then Brett watches the movie and gets mad because Luke likes the Yankees and Brett does not. Meanwhile, Jessie loses Zuri's pet bunny, of which Bertram is extremely scared. In the end, Zuri's class bunny has babies. Guest star: Jack Griffo as Brett Summers
45	19	"Punch Dumped Love"	Bob Koherr	Leigha Barr & Pete Szilagyi	June 28, 2013	213	3.74
Jessie grounds Emma after she neglects to pick up Zuri from school and accidentally reveals it, telling her she cannot go to the school dance. Emma sneaks out to warn Luke that his new crush's ex-boyfriend will embarrass him after Ravi tells her about it. At the dance, Adam Sandler gives Luke some relationship advice. After Jessie discovers Emma absences, she goes to get her as she believed she snuck out to go to the dance. Once she finds her, Jessie didn't believe Emma reasons at first until she got her to listen to her for a second and tells her that she came to the dance to warn Luke about his new crush ex-boyfriend was gonna embarrass him. Despite their efforts, Luke is humiliated and his crush gets back together with him. Meanwhile, Zuri and Ravi set traps to catch a burglar. In the end, Jessie comforts Luke and ends up dancing with him at the school dance and ungrounds Emma for looking out for Luke. Guest stars: Lenny Jacobson as Ted the Delivery Guy, Isabella Palmieri as Rachel Kapowski, Jackson Odell as Gale Note: Adam Sandler appears as himself in this episode, but is not credited.
46	20	"Quitting Cold Koala"	Amanda Bearse	Valerie Ahern & Christian McLaughlin	July 5, 2013	218	2.25
Kenny the Koala has always been there for Luke during countless days and nights, until one day when his obsession crosses the line. Luke must make the biggest decision of his life. He can either give up Kenny or embrace him until the end of his days. Meanwhile, Stuart is devastated that Zuri continuously tries avoiding him and he devises a plan to make her jealous by flirting with Emma instead, despite Emma's annoyance. Convinced enough, Zuri does become jealous and pleads with him to get over Emma. Back on the terrace, Kenny accidentally slips out of Jessie's hands as he gets torn up by a car and a horse, causing Luke to go into a deep shock while accusing Jessie for this mess. Near the end, Luke, saddened by Kenny's sudden fall, reveals why Kenny is so important to him and that he was his only family until Morgan and Christina brought him to the city of New York. Zuri apologizes for taunting Luke all this time and they have a brief embrace. Stuart successfully fixes Kenny, as Luke thanks him and Ravi for saving his best friend from a near-death experience. Guest star: J.J. Totah as Stuart Wooten
47	21	"Panic Attack Room"	Rich Correll	Eric Schaar & David J. Booth	July 5, 2013	224	2.87
Once Luke, Ravi, Zuri, and Stuart are stranded in the Ross panic room with only access to the eight monitor screens of the penthouse's rooms, Luke and Stuart are forced to confess their secrets. Meanwhile, Emma and Bertram support Jessie while she prepares for a TV audition. Unfortunately, this causes Jessie to get trapped in the panic room along with the rest of the children as she realizes were gone for hours. Guest star: J.J. Totah as Stuart Wooten
48	22	"Throw Momma from the Terrace"	Rich Correll	David J. Booth & Eric Schaar	July 12, 2013	222	2.94
Bertram's mother visits to celebrate his birthday, but sadly for them, they do not get along very well, as Wanda continuously steals the spotlight, even if she has to go through extreme measures. Furious with his mother, Bertram stands up for himself, after practicing for a quite a while beforehand, and gives her "the talk" in front of Jessie and the Ross children, thus gaining more confidence to reveal his soft side for the children. Wanda apologizes for her bad behavior as they both happily embrace, making Bertram hungry in the end. Meanwhile, the science world puts the Ross brothers to the test as they're assigned a project which requires an egg. Ravi decides that they should drop the egg and capture its results. Fortunately, Luke perceives this as an opportunity to prove that he is really smart by showing off his outside-the-box thinking. Unfortunately for him, Jessie and Ravi do not accept out-of-the-box ideas and Ravi claims their science project as his own achievement, which confuses Luke. Guest star: Lainie Kazan as Wanda Winkle
49	23	"The Jessie-nator: Grudgement Day"	Rich Correll	Eric Schaar & David J. Booth	July 26, 2013	220	3.47
A Jessie from the future warns present Jessie that exactly 60 years later, in the year 2072, Ravi invents several Bertram-bots that plot to destroy Jessie and rule the world. Meanwhile, Luke accuses Zuri of constantly stealing his valuables. Zuri claims that she only took his watch, but Luke also believes that she stole his joy buzzer. Elsewhere, the four Ross children explore their future with intense shock and awe. Emma becomes furious once she realizes that she is not famous and vows to give the world a piece of her mind. While Jessie struggles to survive with Bertram-bots constantly attacking her, Luke and Zuri apologize to each other for their misunderstanding. In the end, it is revealed that Ravi was warning Luke about his latest prank, as he narrated this entire melodramatic story in order to scare him.
50	24	"Diary of a Mad Newswoman"	Rich Correll	Adam Lapidus	August 9, 2013	226	3.48
Ravi, Luke, and Emma try out on school's new morning webcast "What Up, Walden?". Being the first to show up on the audition, Ravi is appointed as producer by Ms. Devlin. With Bryn also shows up and tries to make up with Emma, she is accepted as co-anchor with Emma. Meanwhile, Jessie learned about that Zuri read her diary through Bertram, to teach Zuri a lesson she put in false information in her diary try to trick Zuri think that she is an alien. At the school, Emma received a text tipping her a scoop, but it turns out to be a bogus story which plotted by Bryn in an attempt to ruin their reputation so that she can own the show. Guest stars: Amy Farrington as Ms. Devlin, Katherine McNamara as Bryn Breitbart
51	25	"Break-Up and Shape-Up"	Rich Correll	Sally Lapiduss	August 23, 2013	225	3.49
Tony and Jessie attempt to make each other jealous by asking their exes on a double-date, causing the duo to break their dating relationships, which also saddens Emma and Zuri in the process. Meanwhile, Luke and Ravi attempt to sabotage each other's plans on how to relieve Bertram's stress level. Unfortunately, this leads Bertram into thinking that the Ross brothers do not actually care about him. Guest stars: Chris Galya as Tony, Spencer Boldman as Ted Hoover, Lulu Antariksa as Victoria "Vic" Montesano
52	26	"G.I. Jessie"	Rich Correll	Pamela Eells O'Connell	September 13, 2013	227–228	4.77
Jessie goes with the children to the military base in Fort Hood, Texas where her father lives and discovers that her father is about to be married to the mother of Jessie's high school rival Darla Shannon, who tried to drown her in a well. Meanwhile, Emma falls in love with Darla's brother, Caleb, and Darla and Jessie will do anything to keep them apart. Guest stars: Molly Shannon as Colonel Shannon, Kate Flannery as Corporal Cookie, James Patrick Stuart as Colonel John Wayne Prescott, Molly Burnett as Darla Shannon, Dylan Boyack as Caleb Shannon, Merrick McCartha as Chaplain Note: This is a double-length special episode.

=== Season 3 (2013–14) ===
No. overall	No. in season	Title	Directed by	Written by	Original release date	Prod. code	U.S. viewers (millions)
53	1	"Ghost Bummers"	Rich Correll	Eric Schaar & David J. Booth	October 5, 2013	301	3.17
Jessie and the Ross kids go to Ms. Chesterfield's Halloween party. When Emma and Luke get possessed by the Doorkeeper and the Codemaster, Ravi creates a liquid that Jessie, Zuri, and Ravi use to defeat Zorag the Destroyer. So Emma and Luke get back to normal. Guest star: Carolyn Hennesy as Mrs. Rhoda Chesterfield
54	2	"Caught Purple Handed"	Rich Correll	Mike Montesano & Ted Zizik	October 11, 2013	302	2.81
Jessie confronts the children on why they did not turn in their money from selling muffins for school. The children end up throwing a party, unbeknownst to Jessie, in order to raise the money. However, when the children lie about a celebrity guest at the party, Luke ends up going in disguise. Meanwhile, Jessie gets an audition for a hand commercial, thanks to her new agent, Max. However, when she accidentally puts her hand in purple paint, her attempt to hide it from the commercial producers causes her to get fired. As a silver lining, Jessie is asked to return for the safety video for the product she was originally supposed to advertise. In the end, Jessie tells Max she still wants to work with him. Guest stars: Matthew Timmons as Max Bauer, Cooper Barnes as Director
55	3	"Understudied and Overdone"	Joel Zwick	Sally Lapiduss & Erin Dunlap	October 18, 2013	303	2.89
Jessie gets a role as an understudy to a famous Broadway actress, Susan Channing, but Luke and Ravi sabotage Susan so Jessie can play the part. Meanwhile, Bertram wants to win his own cooking show, so Emma and Zuri try to help out and end up becoming Internet stars after their mishaps in the kitchen get Susan in a mess on camera. Guest stars: Amanda Jane Cooper as Susan Channing, Ray Ford as Harold
56	4	"The Blind Date, the Cheapskate and the Primate"	Rich Correll	David J. Booth & Eric Schaar	November 1, 2013	305	3.16
Jessie and Tony set up dates for each other to prove they are moving on. Tony believes Jessie is actually planning to set him up with herself, but when he learns she set him up with her friend, he asks the janitor, Earl, to take Jessie out on a date, unaware that Earl likes to eat food people throw out. Meanwhile, Ravi gets an internship at the Central Park zoo, but Luke messes around with the animals when Ravi is put in charge so Emma can take his mentor for a makeover. Guest stars: Chris Galya as Tony, Garrett Clayton as Earl, L.J. Johnson as Ms. Kruchall
57	5	"Lizard Scales and Wrestling Tales"	Rich Correll	Mike Montesano & Ted Zizik	November 15, 2013	304	2.89
When Luke asks Christina about his birthparents, he finds out that his birthmother is a wrestler. Emma successfully helps Luke find this mysterious wrestler, making him slightly emotional afterward once Luke finds out that his biggest hope was a complete lie. He silently walks away, emotionless and heartbroken after Jessie confronts him with this terrible truth. However, Luke is still concerned about why Christina will not tell him about his past. Christina then explains that she hid this from him because she was afraid of losing his trust and compassion for having such a great mother. A confused, yet slightly shocked, Luke replies, saying that Christina is already doing an awesome job mothering him, as they share a wonderful embrace. Meanwhile, Ravi plans to run for club president of Walden Academy Middle School's reptile club and he is forced to choose Zuri as his campaign manager. However, the sibling duo is surprised that Ravi has an opponent running for the same position. Ravi decides that he'll only be co-president along with his new friend. In the end, Luke narrates his thoroughly, yet well-written, report about the true meaning of a family. Guest stars: Christina Moore as Christina Ross, Deven MacNair as Vanessa Colson/The Mauler, Haley Tju as Eileen
58	6	"The Rosses Get Real"	Shannon Flynn	Adam Lapidus	November 22, 2013	307	2.88
After the Ross children jump rope an award-winning television producer called Corrine, she offers them a TV show. Jessie gets over-excited and says yes before the children could say their opinions. They all go back to the penthouse and discuss the show. The next day they start filming and they say they all love each other, but Corrine edits it to make it seem like they all say something rude about something or somebody else. They go back to the penthouse; then in the elevator, they hatch a plan and decide to be nice, but also steal all their footage and upload it to the Internet because Corrine was rude to them. It works and Mrs Kipling makes them leave by giving them a fright. Guest stars: Rachel Germaine as Corinne Baxter, Lily Mae Harrington as Delilah
59	7	"Good Luck Jessie: NYC Christmas"	Phill Lewis and Rich Correll	Bo Belanger & Jonah Kuehner and Valerie Ahern & Christian McLaughlin	November 29, 2013	306	5.79
When Teddy Duncan gets accepted into a college in New York City, she goes to New York, alongside her brother P.J. Later, Teddy meets Jessie and Zuri on the subway. When a blizzard traps P.J. and Teddy in New York City, the Ross children find out that someone took away their Christmas presents and they ask Teddy and P.J. to help them out. Meanwhile, in Denver, Bob and Amy struggle to know what Charlie wished for Christmas since they have no knowledge. Guest stars: Dana Durey as Marcy, Samantha Boscarino as Skyler, Amir K as George, Paul Willson as Santa #2, Logan Moreau as Toby, Joe Gieb as Joe, Peter Allen Vogt as Santa, Mike Batayeh as Sal, Gabby Sanalitro as Ada Notes: This is a combined double-length special episode. The opening credits sequence is a combination of the opening credits sequences of Good Luck Charlie and Jessie, presenting the main cast from both series with the theme songs and visuals from both series interweaved.
60	8	"Krumping and Crushing"	Bob Koherr	Valerie Ahern & Christian McLaughlin	January 10, 2014	309	2.70
When Jessie enrolls Luke in a dance class, the teacher says he is great. To Jessie's dismay, he tells Luke not to do his homework because it gets in the way of dance class. Luke quits later because the instructor only let Jessie and Bertram in so they would not get in the way of his dancing, but removed them because they were awful. Although Luke still went on and won. Meanwhile, Zuri develops a crush on a boy and Emma and Ravi assume it is Tony. Guest stars: Chris Galya as Tony, Roger Bart as Phil McNichol
61	9	"Hoedown Showdown"	Lauren Breiting	Pamela Eells O'Connell	February 21, 2014	308	2.53
When down-to-earth farm girl Maybelle moves into the Fairfield after winning the lottery, Jessie wants Emma to invite her to her party. However, Emma wants it to be sophisticated since she has invited her crush, Rick Larkin, to the party. Emma tries to help Maybelle become a New Yorker, but it does not seem to work. At the party, Maybelle has become sophisticated, which attracts Emma's new boyfriend Rick, who asks her out. Furious that Rick wants to cheat on Emma, Maybelle hogties him. Rick lies and Emma embarrasses her. Eventually, Zuri tells Emma the truth and she dumps Rick and starts fresh with Maybelle. Meanwhile, Ravi gets shot down by Mr. Collinsworth, the school music teacher, to join the band, so Jessie, Ravi, and Luke (disguised as Chip Falcon) start their own band with other school band rejects. Jessie thinks they're not good enough and decides to keep them from playing in the Battle of the Bands by hiding their instruments. When Ravi tells her they just wanted to have fun, she finds their instruments and they play. As predicted, they are horrible, but Ravi's sitar solo impresses Mr. Collinsworth, who invites him to join the band, but Ravi rejects him. In the end, Mr. Collinsworth joins their band by playing his cheeks, which is just humming. Guest stars: Stefanie Scott as Maybelle, Brian Stepanek as Mr. Collinsworth, Noah Centineo as Rick Larkin
62	10	"Snack Attack"	Maxine Lapiduss	Sally Lapiduss & Erin Dunlap	March 7, 2014	310	2.01
Jessie hooks Zuri up with a new girl named Wendy McMillan, the daughter of a casting agent, to get her acting career started. With Jessie, Wendy is an angel, but while Bertram is in charge, she tears up the place and wrecks everything. Zuri tells Jessie she is a monster and wants to stop playing with her, but Jessie does not believe her and assumes she's ignoring her. Meanwhile, Emma goes over her limit on her cell phone bill, so Jessie forces her to get a job at a Central Park snack stand so she can pay the bill herself. However, when Emma finds out that her brothers have also set up a booth that sells more nutritious items, Emma's instincts suspect that Luke and Ravi want competition. Guest stars: Lombardo Boyar as Boomer, Stephen Guarino as James McMillan, Isabella Cramp as Wendy McMillan
63	11	"Creepy Connie 3: The Creepening"	Joel Zwick	Eric Schaar & David J. Booth	April 11, 2014	311	2.81
Connie returns shortly after Luke meets a girl named Mackenzie. She claims that she is over Luke and warns him that Mackenzie, whom she calls "Mad Mack", has a psycho crush on him. When Luke realizes that Mack is obsessed with him, he asks Connie to protect him, but she traps him in the penthouse and tries to force him to marry her. When Mack appears, she and Connie reveal that it was all a setup and she is an actress Connie hired. Meanwhile, Emma leaves her food truck workplace unattended to watch a movie with Zuri and Bertram, but while she is absent the truck is robbed and she is fired. Emma's boss, who is Connie's uncle, visits the apartment to rehire Emma, stopping the wedding in the process. Special guest stars: G. Hannelius as Mackenzie, Sierra McCormick as Connie Guest star: Lombardo Boyar as Boomer
64	12	"Acting with the Frenemy"	Sean Lambert	Mike Montesano & Ted Zizik	April 27, 2014	312	2.37
Jessie meets a new friend named Abbey in acting class, but Jessie finds surprising things about Abbey. Abbey copied Jessie's idea, leaving everyone thinking that was Abbey's brilliant idea. Abbey then bribes Ravi to fire Jessie in the play, but Ravi double-crosses her and helps Jessie instead. Meanwhile, Luke invites a new member to his crew who, to Luke's annoyance, Zuri suddenly has a crush on him, which makes Stuart a bit jealous and upset. Emma advises Stuart to be more funny, but he takes her advice a too literally, boring Zuri in the process. In the end, Stuart stands up for Zuri and she thanks him for that. Luke leaves due to the intensity of the situation. Guest stars: J.J. Totah as Stuart Wooten, Tom Parker as River Stevens, Jillian Rose Reed as Abbey, Nathaniel James Potvin as Shane
65	13	"From the White House to Our House"	Rich Correll	Pamela Eells O'Connell	May 16, 2014	319	2.38
Zuri makes a new friend named Taylor, with whom Jessie connects after learning she is a military child like her. Jessie meets her grandmother who tells her Taylor's birthday is coming up. Jessie and Zuri plan the party, but Taylor gets upset and runs off. Her grandmother explains that Taylor misses her mom, serving in the military, so Zuri calls Michelle Obama and gets her to fly Taylor's mother home for her tenth birthday. The entire Ross family, Taylor's family, and Michelle Obama party in the penthouse. Meanwhile, Emma is in charge of the school pep rally and Ravi wants to be the school mascot. However, Luke auditions after learning the mascot hangs out with the cheerleaders. Luke shows off his dance moves, but Ravi makes a surprise comeback with rapping skills. However, Luke attacks him and Ravi ends up losing, but is made the first ever male cheerleader, much to Luke's disappointment. Special guest star: First Lady Michelle Obama as herself Guest stars: Lauren Pritchard as Coach Penny, Vernee Watson as Mrs. Harris, Kyla-Drew Simmons as Taylor Harris, Yvette Saunders as Sergeant Harris
66	14	"Help Not Wanted"	Steve Hoefer	Erin Dunlap & Sally Lapiduss	June 13, 2014	313	2.43
Jessie is in need of some extra money to buy her dad a birthday present, so she gets a job at the Empire Skate Building before realizing that Emma is her boss. Emma goes very hard on Jessie and they argue in front of an important critic that is reviewing the restaurant. Meanwhile, Luke and Zuri raise money to have Jessie "babysit" for children. Guest stars: Lombardo Boyar as Boomer, Kurt Ela as Beau Jones
67	15	"Where's Zuri?"	Rich Correll	Mike Montesano & Ted Zizik	June 20, 2014	317	2.45
Jessie and Zuri discover Stuart is cooler than his old self because he has a new laid back nanny named Hudson. When Jessie forbids Zuri from hanging out with Stuart after she and Stuart's nanny get into an argument, Zuri and Stuart run away. Meanwhile, Ravi competes for the talent show, but Bertram wants him to sing and Luke wants him to dance. However, he cannot do it and does cup stacking at the show instead and wins the first-prize trophy. Guest stars: Matt Shively as Hudson, J.J. Totah as Stuart Wooten
68	16	"Morning Rush"	Kevin Chamberlin	Valerie Ahern & Christian McLaughlin	June 27, 2014	314	3.35
The children take a long time getting ready for school in the morning, so Jessie has to help every one of them with their individual problems. When she has enough of them she yells at them and the children finally go to school. A couple minutes later, they come back home, realizing that there was no school because of parent-teacher conferences. Instead, Jessie has to go to school and is late.
69	17	"Lights, Camera, Distraction!"	Lauren Breiting	Adam Lapidus	July 11, 2014	315	2.50
Jessie becomes frustrated that she cannot land any acting gigs, so she takes matters into her own hands by participating in a 24-hour film festival. She recruits the children to help her direct, shoot, and edit her film with Tony, but things get complicated when all the children have their own ideas about what the film should be about. Guest star: Chris Galya as Tony
70	18	"Spaced Out"	Rich Correll	Adam Lapidus	July 25, 2014	318	2.52
Ravi's birthday present from Christina and Morgan is a trip into outer space. Things go awry when Ravi is left behind and Jessie, Emma, Zuri, and Luke are on the locked shuttle. Ivan, Bertram, Ravi, and Mrs. Kipling must come to the rescue. At the end, Ravi realizes the whole ordeal was a dream. Note: Guest character Ivan is mentioned to be from the fictional country Mypos, which originated from the show Perfect Strangers, which aired on Disney Channel's sister network ABC. Guest star: John Rubinstein as Ivan
71	19	"The Talltale Duck" "The Telltale Duck"	Leigh-Allyn Baker	Pamela Eells O'Connell	August 8, 2014	316	1.58
Bertram convinces Jessie to act likes he is successful at his high school reunion. However, the lies lead them both into trouble. Ravi steals a game when Jessie tells him he cannot get it. Luke and Ravi play the game and hide it from Jessie every time she comes around. Ravi tries to return the game with the help from Emma, Zuri, and Luke. Guest stars: Gregory Thirloway as Eric Booth, Lauren Benz Phillips as Alexia
72	20	"Coffee Talk"	Debby Ryan	Jessica Lopez	August 22, 2014	327	2.19
Justin Timberlake is in town and Jessie gets two VIP tickets to see him. Emma enlists the help of Ravi to try to get Jessie's VIP wristband. Jessie then realizes that she only has one ticket and tells Ravi about the news. Ravi tells Emma and Zuri and they plan on stopping Jessie from going to the concert. Ravi then grabs the ticket and makes a run for it, only to find himself outnumbered on the terrace. Jessie commands him to cut up the wristband and he does so. Meanwhile, Bertram and Luke start fighting over Bertram's new coffee maker that he calls Serena. At the end, Jessie, Emma, and Zuri find out that Ravi had conned them and had gone to the concert. Guest star: Monica Marie Contreras as Serena V.O.
73	21	"Between the Swoon and New York City"	Jon Rosenbaum	Erin Dunlap & Sally Lapiduss	September 19, 2014	323	1.76
Sparks fly when Jessie meets Brooks; she starts worrying after finding out that he is Mrs. Chesterfield's son. She insists that Jessie is not right for him, but he stands up to her and stays with Jessie. Meanwhile, Luke loses his special baseball to Ravi. He later trades it for more Yankee items. Bertram is forced to babysit Zeus, only to become appreciative of the dog. Guest stars: John Michael Higgins as Carlisle, Carolyn Hennesy as Mrs. Rhoda Chesterfield, Pierson Fode as Brooks Wentworth
74	22	"No Money, Mo' Problems"	Victor Gonzalez	Adam Lapidus	September 26, 2014	324	2.03
Mrs. Chesterfield tries to break up Jessie and Brooks. Luke, Emma, and Zuri learn about Ravi's late history report and throw him an appreciation day (styled R.A.D.). Emma and Zuri convince Tony to open up to Jessie while he also gives Brooks a job at the Fairfield. When Tony tries to talk to Jessie in the elevator, he is interrupted by Brooks proposing to Jessie. Guest stars: Carolyn Hennesy as Mrs. Rhoda Chesterfield, Chris Galya as Tony, Pierson Fode as Brooks Wentworth
75	23	"The Runaway Bride of Frankenstein"	Bob Koherr	Vanessa Mancos	October 2, 2014	325	2.21
Jessie does not know if she should marry Brooks, so she says she needs time to think. Meanwhile, Brooks tries to get all the children to like him so that Jessie will say yes, but he fails and ruins something for the children. In the end, Emma and Zuri tell Jessie that she belongs with Tony, but she shocks them and tells them that Tony did not propose and Brooks did. Jessie dreams about the perfect boyfriend, but when she wakes up, she realizes that there is no perfect boyfriend and also realizes that Brooks is perfect for her and decides to marry Brooks. Guest star: Pierson Fode as Brooks Wentworth
76	24	"There Goes the Bride"	Bob Koherr	Pamela Eells O'Connell	October 10, 2014	326	2.72
Jessie and Brooks are getting married, but when he accepts a job in Africa, he begs a reluctant Jessie to go with him. Jessie decides to go, but the children each try to make either Jessie or Brooks regret going with the other. Bertram scolds the children for being so selfish and they go and tell Jessie that they want her to be happy. In the end, Jessie realizes that she is not ready to leave the children and they both realize their dreams will separate them. Jessie and Brooks call off the wedding and break up. Guest stars: Carolyn Hennesy as Mrs. Rhoda Chesterfield, Chris Galya as Tony, Pierson Fode as Brooks Wentworth
77	25	"Ride to Riches"	Bob Koherr	Peter Szilagyi & Leigha Barr	November 21, 2014	320	1.93
Jessie gets to an important audition, but she and Ravi get on the game show called "Rides to Riches", where contestants can win prizes on taxi rides. Meanwhile, Luke and Emma find out that Bertram has a secret hobby of going to Renaissance Faires, pretending to be a medieval king named "King Stormborn" with some men pretending to be guards or peasants. Luke and Emma meet Grover, who went by the name of Lord Thunderblood. Lord Thunderblood claims Bertram had stole his title of king. Playing along, Luke and Emma, as "Sir Pop-and-Lock" and the "Wicked Witch of the Upper West Side", help Thunderblood regain his title. However, during a play fight, Bertram breaks his ankle and is embarrassed, blaming Luke and Emma for ruining the fun for him. Guest stars: Bob Bledsoe as Mort, Chris Wylde as Grover
78	26	"Jessie's Aloha Holidays with Parker and Joey"	Shannon Flynn	Eric Schaar & David J. Booth and Valerie Ahern & Christian McLaughlin	November 28, 2014	321–322	3.50
Jessie scores a role on a show, Aloha Crime, which shoots in Hawaii around Christmas, so Jessie takes the children. When they arrive, Bertram is renting Christina and Morgan's villa out to Jessie's famous friend, Shaylee Michaels, to earn some money. Parker and Joey Rooney from Liv and Maddie are staying next door to the Rosses. Joey develops a crush on Emma and Parker befriends Zuri. Special guest stars: Maia Mitchell as Shaylee Michaels, Joey Bragg as Joey Rooney, Tenzing Norgay Trainor as Parker Rooney Guest stars: Amy Hill as Keahi, Wayne Wilderson as Kevin Randolf Note: This is a double-length special episode.

=== Season 4 (2015) ===
No. overall	No. in season	Title	Directed by	Written by	Original release date	Prod. code	U.S. viewers (millions)
79	1	"But Africa Is So... Fari"	Rich Correll	Eric Schaar	January 9, 2015	402	2.43
Jessie receives an email from Brooks. Jessie leaves Bertram in charge of the children and when they ask him where Jessie is, he says she has gone to talk to Brooks, so the children are convinced she went to Africa to talk to him, so they go to Africa to try to find her. Back in New York, Jessie removes a note from them on Bertram's forehead mentioning their departure. When Jessie arrives, she sees Brooks and thinks that he is still in love with her, but Brooks tries to tell Jessie that he is not. The children all have fun until they are ready to leave the grassland, before the lions come, but the jeep's tires are punctured by the tree branch Luke broke by falling off a tree earlier. The only way to get the jeep moving is to gather fecal matter from animals to power the jeep's biofuel-powered engine. When they are finished, a rhinoceros sees and chases them, so they get into the van and drive off, leaving Ravi. Brooks stops the Jeep to allow Ravi to get in. Jessie tries to tackle the rhino to get it off the Jeep. Later, Jessie finds out that Brooks really is not in love with her still as he is actually dating Kami. Jessie then realizes she is actually happy for Brooks. Guest stars: Pierson Fode as Brooks Wentworth, Hina Abdullah as Kami
80	2	"A Close Shave"	Shannon Flynn	Valerie Ahern & Christian McLaughlin	January 16, 2015	401	2.35
Bertram helps Luke shave, but it turns into a disaster when Bertram accidentally shaves one part of Luke's head after Zuri startles him, leading both of them to fear retaliation from Luke. However, accepting Jessie's advice to not retaliate, Luke decides not to take revenge on Bertram and Zuri, as he is becoming more mature. Meanwhile, Darla comes to New York to visit Jessie. To avoid being mocked by Darla for not going through with her wedding to Brooks, Jessie lies and tells Darla that Tony is Brooks. Guest stars: Chris Galya as Tony, Molly Burnett as Darla Shannon
81	3	"Four Broke Kids"	Kevin Chamberlin	Pamela Eells O'Connell	February 6, 2015	410	2.13
Jessie tells the Ross children that their parents have lost all their money, so everyone has to find a way to make some more. Meanwhile, Mrs. Chesterfield moves into their apartment while Tony lets Jessie and the children use his. After days of sleeping in the tiny ramshackle apartment and working for money, Jessie tells the children that the government has made a mistake and that their parents have their money back. Mrs. Chesterfield, who briefly ends up as a suspect for the Ross' financial loss, ends up losing her money after Ravi informs the government about some illegal tax deductions that he found on her computer, so Tony offers to let her stay at his apartment. Guest stars: Carolyn Hennesy as Mrs. Rhoda Chesterfield, Chris Galya as Tony
82	4	"Moby and SCOBY"	Bob Koherr	Pamela Eells O'Connell	February 20, 2015	404	2.10
Emma is working on a new project she calls a SCOBY; Luke makes fun of it, causing Emma to call Morgan's special effects crew to terrify Luke. Bertram then tells Luke that Emma was tricking him the whole time, promoting Luke to plot revenge. Jessie goes back to college, only to find out that she is in the same class as Ravi. Jessie must read Moby Dick for her next assignment, but she then gets caught up in crises of other people. Elsewhere, Zuri brings Gladys, a giraffe, home from Africa; Gladys starts to grow comfort in Bertram and she starts hanging out with him more than Zuri, making Zuri mad. Guest star: Kevin Symons as Professor Fisk
83	5	"Karate Kid-tastrophe"	Bob Koherr	Adam Lapidus	March 27, 2015	403	1.98
A grueling assignment allows Luke to teach Zuri karate. Later, Zuri gets nervous and cannot cut the board. Luke teaches her that fury will get her to break the board by calling her a "chicken". Meanwhile, Emma's unusual rebellious and temperamental behavior impacts her relationship with Jessie. Later, Jessie runs into Mr. Moseby, the manager of the Tipton Hotel, in New York, and he tells her the best way to understand what is going on with a child is to talk to them. Special guest star: Phill Lewis as Mr. Moseby
84	6	"Basket Case"	Rich Correll	Adam Lapidus	March 28, 2015	405	1.38
Jessie must work on a project with an eager Hudson, much to her dismay. Meanwhile, Ravi wants to fit in with Luke and the other basketball players, but Luke does not think he can do it, so Jessie helps Ravi. Ravi makes an awful shot and the ball lands in NBA star Chris Paul's food. Chris Paul's ambition to make Ravi a better player takes all day. Elsewhere, Zuri keeps wearing Emma's clothes regardless of her actions. Special guest star: Christopher E. Paul as himself Guest stars: Matt Shively as Hudson, Nadji Jeter as Terry, Marcus Choi as Professor Hawkins
85	7	"Capture the Nag"	Rich Correll	Mike Montesano & Ted Zizik	April 7, 2015	409	1.85
A plan to go to the park to play in the snow is derailed when a treacherous blizzard affects Manhattan and causes a power outage. The Ross family decides to play an indoor game of Capture the Flag, which Hudson and Stuart get involved in. Unfortunately, Ravi begins to lose respect for Jessie during the game as she only cares about winning rather than playing for fun and he quits, Emma joining him shortly after. Later, Jessie learns that her being very competitive has turned her into her dad, so she apologizes to Emma and Ravi and then plays for fun. After a few more rounds of Capture the Flag, the power comes back on. Guest stars: Matt Shively as Hudson, J.J. Totah as Stuart Wooten
86	8	"What a Steal"	Phill Lewis	Valerie Ahern & Christian McLaughlin	April 17, 2015	413	1.57
In an effort to help Ravi make friends, Jessie takes him to a MENSA meeting in the park; however, their friends, Madeline and Scott, may be too good to be true. Meanwhile, Luke tricks Bertram into helping him find a valuable sports card and Jessie goes on a date with Scott. When Jessie, Luke, Bertram, and Scott return to the penthouse, Scott reveals that he is robbing the penthouse with his sister, Madeline, and they handcuff the others. Jessie then tricks the troublesome two and says she wants to help them. While in the elevator, Jessie reveals she is calling the police and the two siblings are arrested. Guest stars: Francesca Capaldi as Madeline, Blake Cooper Griffin as Scott
87	9	"Driving Miss Crazy"	Rich Correll	Mike Montesano & Ted Zizik	April 24, 2015	408	2.18
When Emma gets her learner's permit and is ready to drive, Jessie attempts to teach her, but struggles. Later, she takes Emma to the DMV so she can get her driver's license. Meanwhile, Luke and Ravi break Zuri's wishing ball, so Luke blames Ravi, Ravi retaliates, and a standoff among the three ensues. At the end, the trio apologizes for their actions, but Jessie grounds them. Guest star: Raymond Lee as Clifford
88	10	"Bye Bye Bertie"	Debby Ryan	Sally Lapiduss & Erin Dunlap	May 15, 2015	407	1.80
Luke and the girls pull a prank on Bertram, but it makes Bertram reach his wits, quit his job, and work for Mrs. Chesterfield. Meanwhile, Jessie and the Ross kids hire a new butler named Roger, who is highly strict with his rules, wants Jessie to pass her essay to the fullest, and wants the children to keep the whole penthouse tidy. Elsewhere, Mrs. Chesterfield makes moves on Bertram which he finds uncomfortable. Later, the girls and Luke apologize to Bertram for pulling the prank. Bertram then quits working for Mrs. Chesterfield and returns to work at the penthouse. Mrs. Chesterfield becomes upset because the Rosses always have a happy ending and she ends up isolated. Roger then walks in and Mrs. Chesterfield hires him to be her new butler. Guest stars: Carolyn Hennesy as Mrs. Rhoda Chesterfield, Napoleon Ryan as Roger
89	11	"Rossed at Sea, Part 1"	Rich Correll	Joshua Corey & Brian Kratz	June 5, 2015	414	2.14
Jessie and the children take a vacation on the Ross' yacht for their one-month vacation. In the middle of the ocean, they rescue a woman with amnesia, who Luke develops a crush on and Zuri believes is a mermaid. Meanwhile, Bertram stays home with Mrs. Kipling, who misses Ravi. Guest star: Meaghan Martin as Delphina
90	12	"Rossed at Sea, Part 2"	Rich Correll	Mike Montesano & Ted Zizik	June 6, 2015	415	1.96
After Bertram joins Jessie and the Ross children's vacation, they go exploring on an Italian island. Their tour guide tells a story about Jessie's necklace and how its curse brings anyone who wears it bad luck. Meanwhile, Luke and Ravi attempt to try firewalking in order to impress girls. Guest star: Deniz Akdeniz as Marco
91	13	"Rossed at Sea, Part 3"	Rich Correll	Joshua Corey & Brian Kratz	June 7, 2015	416	2.39
The children start arguing with each other, as well as Jessie and Bertram. Jessie decides to dock the ship so they can return home on a plane. When they are ready to exit the ship, they find they have drifted out to sea. They must work together to save the ship and themselves when a storm approaches.
92	14	"Dance, Dance Resolution"	Debby Ryan	Sally Lapiduss & Erin Dunlap	July 10, 2015	412	1.97
In the lead up to the "Win Big Shindig", a school dance preceding a football game, the kids try to find dates to the dance: Luke tries to ask out popular girl Nora St. Clair, utilizing big and over-the-top proposals to impress her, but he unintentionally hurts her in the process; Ravi tries to ask out a bad girl from his chemistry class, Jax, but upon finding out from Luke that she only liked bad boys, he starts dressing and acting like a bad boy, even going as far as causing an explosion in his class that makes his teacher's face turn blue, resulting in him and Jax getting detention on the night of the dance; Zuri tries to ask out a student, Martin, and asks Emma for help; although, Emma's advice of "playing hard to get" fails as Zuri ends up going to the dance alone. At the night of the dance, Ravi and Jax escape detention, Emma sets up Zuri with Martin in order to apologize for her bad advice, and Luke finally impresses Nora with a simple proposal. Meanwhile, Bertram gets a chance to perform at the Met, but finds himself nervous as he was given a one-line solo. Special guest stars: The Vamps Guest stars: Matt Cook as Mr. Feeley, Vale De La Maza as Jax, Genneya Walton as Nora, Jaden Martin as Martin
93	15	"Someone Has Tou-pay"	Rich Correll	Valerie Ahern & Christian McLaughlin	July 24, 2015	406	1.65
Jessie must find out who took Bertram's wig that he's using for his boy band reunion concert, while using it to help her audition for a TV Commercial. It is revealed that Emma took it to give it a makeover, but got puffy, Ravi found it and gave it a treatment to depuff it, but made it smelly, gave it to Zuri to wash but got stolen by a bird, and then Luke found it in a tree and hid it in the freezer. After discovering that the toupee's not in the fridge, Jessie then discovers that she mistook it for a rat and fed it to Mrs. Kipling. Jessie gives Bertram a pep talk and he is able to perform. Afterwards, Jessie didn't get the job, but she says that at least she solved the mystery. After she walks away, Mrs. Kipling is seen wearing the toupee after she pooped it out.
94	16	"Identity Thieves"	Debby Ryan	Monica Contreras & Jess Pineda	September 11, 2015	417	1.44
Emma and Ravi are found in a crisis when Luke becomes the smart one with a perfect PSAT score while Zuri is the fashionista. Bertram tries to find out what's hiding behind a locked door. Meanwhile, Jessie is running around trying to solve these problems, in the end Jessie solves all of their problems. Meanwhile, Bertram tries to find out what's behind a door that's in the theater, which he later finds out is Jessie's relaxing place. Guest star: Gilli Messer as Pepper
95	17	"Katch Kipling"	Lauren Breiting	Adam Lapidus	September 18, 2015	418	2.28
When Ravi agrees to let Mrs. Kipling rummage in New York and through its tunnels to embrace her natural instincts, she becomes a celebrity and gets her and Ravi fans and followers. When she stops, Ravi doesn't want her to, so he creates a dummy version of Mrs. Kipling to run through the tunnels. When Luke looks for Ravi and finds him, he ensures him that people will like him for him someday, but they both get lost in the tunnels. Meanwhile, Emma attempts to audition for a musical and Jessie enlists Bertram to coach her since that's his favorite musical, but he overworks her enough for her to drop the audition. Zuri then tries to convince Jessie to let her go to the park by herself to be independent, but Jessie fears that something bad will happen and spies on her by dressing like an old lady. In the end, Luke and Ravi find their way out, Jessie finally sees that Zuri is all grown up, and Bertram apologizes to Emma and convinces her to audition, which she agrees to if he auditions with her.
96	18	"The Ghostess with the Mostest"	Rich Correll	Erin Dunlap & Sally Lapiduss	October 2, 2015	411	2.10
Jessie plans to attend a Central Park Halloween masquerade party after dreaming of meeting a romantic, handsome stranger at such a party. The children are supposed to go trick-or-treating with Stuart, but he tells a story of a lonely ghost girl named Abigail who rises out of the grave to look for 'friends', and one by one, the children start disappearing. Meanwhile, Jessie attends the masquerade, where she is quickly swept off her feet by a handsome, masked stranger, then Emma, Zuri, and Stuart crash the ball and tell Jessie that Ravi and Luke have vanished. Worried, Jessie leaves the ball, promising to return; her mystery date promises to wait for her. Jessie asks Tony to help her search for the others, then Emma and Stuart disappear. When Tony, Jessie and Zuri, then arrive at a haunted house, they learn the children were invited to a party hosted by Stuart, disguised as Abigail, as a prank. Jessie is afraid she may never see her mystery man again but decides to return to the ball after knowing the children are safe. When she returns, she finds her handsome mystery man waited for her and he reveals himself to be Tony, who was accepted into the fire department. Now there is no doubt in her mind that there are still sparks between them, and Tony and Jessie finally get back together. Meanwhile, Bertram wants to know who's been stealing his Halloween candy; at the end, the children, Jessie, Bertram and Stuart find out the candy culprit was the real Abigail, which scares them. Special guest stars: Austin North as Logan Watson, Sarah Gilman as Delia Delfano Guest stars: Chris Galya as Tony, J.J. Totah as Stuart Wooten, Jordan Oschman as Abigail
97	19	"The Fear in Our Stars"	Bob Koherr	Teleplay by : Joshua Corey & Brian Kratz; Story by : Eric Schaar	October 9, 2015	419	2.50
When Luke and Ravi go with Ravi's star gazing club to observe a meteor that's passing close to Earth, Luke flirts with a girl who Ravi attempted to ask out, motivating him to plot revenge by convincing Luke that the Meteor will hit the Earth. When Ravi tells him it was all a prank, he later calculates that the meteor will actually hit the Earth where they are. Meanwhile, Jessie tries to practice for her "Special Skills" she listed in her resume in order to help for her audition, constantly disturbing Mrs. Chesterfield in the process. Elsewhere, Emma tries to sneak out to go to a party without Jessie knowing and Bertram and Zuri watch a marathon of their favorite show in order to find out a secret in the series finale. At the end, the meteor does hit the earth, but it explodes into a million pieces when it enters the atmosphere, therefore, no one is harmed. Guest stars: Carolyn Hennesy as Mrs. Rhoda Chesterfield, Malia Tyler as Heidi
98	20	"Jessie Goes to Hollywood"	Bob Koherr	Pamela Eells O'Connell	October 16, 2015	420	2.43
Christina Ross returns to the Ross house, but gets upset and jealous when the children want to do activities with Jessie more than her. Christina books an acting gig for Jessie in an attempt to spend more time with the children. However, the children secretly fly to Hollywood to see Jessie on set and seek her help, as they believe their mother would not be able to spend any time with them and help out. The children sneak onto the H of the Hollywood sign to view Jessie on set, but the giant letter begins to tip over when Luke and Ravi fight over a pair of binoculars. Jessie hears the children and uses some props to rescue them, but accidentally tips over the giant H afterward. Her actions lead her to star in a new television show about a superhero nanny. Jessie decides to leave the Ross family to star in this new show and Christina decides to become a stay-at-home mother so she can spend time with her children. The Ross family, including Bertram, then say their goodbyes to Jessie before she goes to Hollywood. As the series ends, Jessie runs into Tony, who had left his doorman job and moved to Hollywood himself to become a security guard for the film studio, and the Ross children followed her to Hollywood to wish her luck. Guest stars: Christina Moore as Christina Ross, Chris Galya as Tony, John Fleck as Robert R.J. Roberts
