= Grown Ups (1999 TV series) =

American television series

- Official series logo, as shown on UPN's website from 2000
- Genre: Sitcom
- Created by: Matthew Miller
- Written by: Valerie Ahern; Mark Amato; Mark Bluntman; Howard Busgang; Pamela Eells; Arthur Harris; Bob Hilgenberg; John Hunter; Stephen Lloyd; Christian McLaughlin; Matthew Miller; Rick Newberger; Rob Muir; Jeny Quine; Billy Riback; Scott J. Rosenbaum; Dan Signer; Chuck Snyder; Van Whitfield
- Directed by: Richard Correll; Matthew Diamond; Iris Dugrow; Sheldon Epps; Joyce Gittlin; Lillah McCarthy; Jeffery L. Melman; Jonathan Prince; Brian K. Roberts; Tony Singletary; John Tracy; John Whitesell; Steve Zuckerman
- Starring: Jaleel White; Dave Ruby; Marissa Ribisi
- Theme music composer: Quincy Jones III
- Opening theme: Performed by Tionne "T-Boz" Watkins
- Composers: Becky Kneubuhl; Jonathan Wolff
- Country of origin: United States
- Original language: English
- No. of seasons: 1
- No. of episodes: 22

Production
- Executive producers: Craig Baumgarten; Pamela Eells; Alan Haymon; Rick Newberger; Jonathan Prince; Billy Riback
- Producers: Arthur Harris; Patricia Fass Palmer; Lyah LeFlore; Jaleel White
- Cinematography: Donald A. Morgan
- Editor: Jesse Hoke
- Running time: 30 minutes
- Production companies: Alan Haymon Productions; Columbia TriStar Television

Original release
- Network: UPN
- Release: August 23, 1999 – May 22, 2000

Grown Ups is an American television sitcom that aired on the UPN network from August 23, 1999, to May 22, 2000. Starring Jaleel White, the series was created by Matthew Miller and based on a story written by White.

== Plot ==
Grown Ups follows the lives of three post-college friends who are coming to terms with adulthood. J. Calvin Frazier is a 24-year-old man whose roommate just left town nearly leaving him homeless. J. also learns that his high school crush Melissa (Tammy Townsend) is engaged to another man. With the help of his best friend Gordon (Dave Ruby) and Gordon's wife Shari (Marissa Ribisi), J. attempts to deal with his problems and adjust to life as a grown up.

In the pilot episode, Soleil Moon Frye appeared as Robin Carlucci, J.'s new roommate who wrongly assumes that J. is gay. The series was retooled after the pilot and Frye's character was dropped.

== Cast ==
The Grown Ups cast (from left to right), Dave Ruby as Gordon Hammel, Marissa Ribisi as Shari Hammel and Jaleel White as J. Calvin Frazier.

=== Main ===
- Jaleel White as J. Calvin Frazier
- Dave Ruby as Gordon Hammel
- Marissa Ribisi as Shari Hammel

=== Recurring ===
- Patrick Bristow as Rodney Caruthers
- Bumper Robinson as Marcus Wentworth
- Tammy Townsend as Melissa

== Reception ==
Grown Ups premiered on August 23, 1999, at 8:30 EST/7:30 CST. On August 30, 1999, the series moved to Mondays at 9 p.m. EST/8 p.m. CST, following the Moesha spin-off The Parkers. The series initially garnered good ratings, but ratings soon dropped and UPN canceled the series (on a cliffhanger that was never resolved) in May 2000.

== Episodes ==
No.	Title	Directed by	Written by	Original release date	Viewers (millions)
1	"Pilot"	John Whitesell	Matthew Miller	August 23, 1999	4.43
J has recently discovered that his roommate has moved out and now he has to find a new one. He gets a roommate in the form of Robin, who thinks he's gay. One of Gordon's coworkers, Marcus, is dating one of J's old girlfriends. J now has to deal with his new roommate and the feelings he has for his old flame.
2	"Truth Be Told"	Rich Correll	Jeny Quine	August 30, 1999	4.55
While playing the game of "Truth Be Told," J discovers that his girlfriend is still a virgin, while Gordon discovers that he wasn't Sherri's first experience. J and Melissa decide to have sex, and J experiences some bedroom problems.
3	"The Out of Work-Out"	Rich Correll	Matthew Miller	September 6, 1999	4.01
J quits his job and tries to get another one. He hangs out at a spa to mingle with important business professionals. He eventually gets a new job when he runs into a female member of the club that has her own company.
4	"A Comic Tragedy"	Jeff Melman	Mark Amato	September 13, 1999	3.84
J and Gordon fight over ownership of a comic book that Shari put on Ebay. The comic puts their friendship in jeopardy. The book turns out to be worthless since Gordon cut an ad out of it; the only winner was Marcus, who cashed in on the legal fees.
5	"Bachelor Auction"	John Tracy	Mark Blutman & Howard Busgang	September 20, 1999	3.92
J enters a bachelor auction to make his new girlfriend jealous. He gets bought by Gordon's boss' daughter who has a fatal attraction to him.
6	"J Says"	Brian K. Roberts	Jeny Quine	October 4, 1999	3.18
J takes an encounter with a newspaper columnist who annoyed him, and turns it into a chance at getting his own nationally syndicated column.
7	"Family Circus"	Brian K. Roberts	Arthur Harris	October 18, 1999	3.92
Against Melissa's wishes, J arranges to meet her parents while they're in town visiting, but quickly discovers why she was so reluctant to introduce him to her germaphobic mother and crazy father. Meanwhile, Gordon and Shari try their hand at writing a children's book, hoping to win a contest that awards the winning author $50,000.
8	"Two Divided by J Equals Ex"	Steve Zuckerman	Rick Newberger	November 8, 1999	3.16
J's brother comes to town with news of his impending marriage to Donna, who just happens to have had a fling with J years ago.
9	"Vegas, a Place in the Sun"	Steve Zuckerman	Arthur Harris & Mark Amato	November 15, 1999	3.31
J goes to Las Vegas to try to stop his brother's wedding to Donna.
10	"Why Can't We Not Be Friends?"	Matthew Diamond	Billy Riback	November 22, 1999	3.11
J's girlfriend Melissa returns from abroad in time for Thanksgiving, but their relationship isn't the same after months of separation.
11	"Online Romance"	Matthew Diamond	Valerie Ahern & Christian McLaughlin	December 6, 1999	3.32
J and Gordon go crazy with their fantasies, as Gordon loves Shari in her new Scully wig. J dates a former Chicago Bulls cheerleader.
12	"Housesitter"	Joyce Gittlin	Valerie Ahern & Christian McLaughlin	January 3, 2000	3.73
J tries to score points with his boss by watching his log cabin during a blizzard; J brings his friends along and everything goes bad.
13	"Instant Karma"	Sheldon Epps	Matthew Miller	January 24, 2000	3.43
J tells a blind date that he'll call her and doesn't, so his karma suddenly go bad; he gets locked out of his apartment, gets an infection on his butt and loses to Gordon in basketball. Meanwhile, Gordon investigates his maid and finds out what she really does.
14	"Action"	John Tracy	Mark Blutman & Howard Busgang	February 7, 2000	4.30
J, Gordon and Shari get cast as extras in Cameron Russell's new movie. J discovers the other side of his favorite action hero. Guest Star: Paul Michael Levesque as Cameron Russell
15	"Valentine's J"	John Tracy	Jeny Quine	February 14, 2000	3.70
J and Marcus battle to see who can get the most attractive date. J gets multiple dates and everything backfires in his face.
16	"New Job"	John Tracy	Pamela Eells	February 21, 2000	2.95
J thinks he hit the jackpot when he goes to work for a computer genius. Sheri gets to edit her first book.
17	"Sons & Lovers"	Tony Singletary	Stephen Lloyd	March 20, 2000	3.43
J meets an older woman and begins dating her. Unknown to him, she's Logan's mother, and Logan discovers them in bed together. Logan claims that it doesn't bother him, but he has J doing more work. It's not until Logan's mother finds out that J's suffering comes to an end, as does their relationship.
18	"J's Pet Peeve"	Rich Correll	Van Whitfield	April 10, 2000	2.86
J agrees to watch Melissa's dog, who doesn't like him.
19	"The Car Makes the Man"	Iris Dugow	Scott Rosenbaum	May 1, 2000	2.68
J buys a Mercedes to pretend to be successful, and ends up going into poverty to pay off the expensive bill.
20	"Out of Sync"	Rich Correll	Story by : Jaleel White; Teleplay by : Billy Riback	May 8, 2000	3.22
J creates his own boy band, the Macho Five. It backfires in his face when the group dumps him and makes Gordon a member.
21	"Match Breaker J"	Lillah McCarthy	John Hunter & Chuck Snyder	May 15, 2000	2.99
J tries to match Logan up with the new intern.
22	"Nerds of a Feather Gawk Together"	John Tracy	Dan Signer	May 22, 2000	3.35
J tries to help some of his coworkers with dating by offering them tips. He also discovers that Melissa is getting married after he sees her with a wedding ring; he realizes that he loves her and proposes to her. Melissa agrees, and reveals that the ring was her girlfriend's ring for her marriage.

== Episode status ==
As of 2026, the series is currently available for streaming online on Plex, The Roku Channel and Tubi, as well as the Throwback TV YouTube channel (managed by Sony Pictures).
