= Acting Dead =

- Genre: Horror, Comedy
- Created by: Brian Beacock
- Written by: Brian Beacock
- Directed by: Alan David Morgan
- Starring: Brian Beacock, Jillian Clare, Chris Galya, Patrika Darbo, Paul Nygro, John Yelvington
- Composer: Jamie Forsyth
- Country of origin: United States
- Original language: English
- No. of seasons: 1
- No. of episodes: 11

Production
- Producers: Susan Bernhardt, Brian Beacock, Paul Nygro
- Cinematography: Jared Hoy
- Production company: Leonian

Original release
- Release: April 24, 2016

Acting Dead is an American satirical dark comedy about the world of Hollywood zombies. The series focuses on Tate Blodgett (Brian Beacock), a zombie, and Alex Carbonneux (Jillian Clare), a ghost, as they both struggle with their new afterlife.

== Episodes ==
- Episode 1: Career Suicide
- Episode 2: Throw The Switch!
- Episode 3: Polterguise
- Episode 4: Talent and Brains
- Episode 5: The "X" Is Silent But Deadly
- Episode 6: This Town Needs an Exorcist
- Episode 7: Take You Out for a Bite
- Episode 8: Money Back Scarentee

== Cast and characters ==
=== Main cast ===
- Brian Beacok as Tate Blodgett
- Jillian Clare as Alex Carbonneux
- Chris Galya as Hunter Lee
- Patrika Darbo as Margot Mullen, Tate's agent.
- Paul Nygro as Paul Baker
- John Yelvington as Maddox Shane

=== Guest stars ===
- Debbie Gibson as Roberta
- Sheila Korsi as Rosalia
- Lori Alan as Zombietologist
- Carolyn Hennesy as Dr. Ivana Wurshter
- Christine Lakin as Snotty Casting Director
- Eric Martsolf as Lab Assistant
- John J. York as Tennyson Albright
- Cocoa Brown as Scared Casting Director
- Peter Allen Vogt as Xavier LeBeaux

== Awards ==
Austin Indie Flix Showcase, 2014

| • | Won, Jury Award |
| | Best Actress Jillian Clare |

Austin WebFest, 2015

| • | Won |
| | Best Special Effects |

Brooklyn WebFest, 2015

| • | Won |
| | Best Comedy |

FilmQuest, US, 2015

| • | Won, FilmQuest Cthulhu |
| | Best Web Series |

IFQ, 2015

| • | Won |
| | Best Director, David Morgan |

Independent Film Quarterly Film and Webisode Festival, 2014

| • | Won, Festival Award |
| | Best Director of a Web Series Alan David Morgan |

Indie Series Awards, 2015

| • | Won, ISA |
| | Best Guest Actor- Comedy Peter Allen Vogt |
| • | Won, ISA |
| | Best Web Series - Comedy |
| • | Won, ISA |
| | Best Supporting Actor (Comedy) Chris Galya |
| • | Won, ISA |
| | Best Writing (Comedy) Brian Beacock (writer) |
| • | Nominated, ISA |
| | Best Guest Actress - Comedy Carolyn Hennesy |
| • | Nominated, ISA |
| | Best Supporting Actress (Comedy) Deborah Gibson |
| • | Nominated, ISA |
| | Best Actress (Comedy) Jillian Clare |
| • | Nominated, ISA |
| | Best Makeup Jen Grable |
| • | Nominated, ISA |
| | Best Actor (Comedy) Brian Beacock |
| • | Nominated, ISA |
| | Best Production Design Danny Cistone |

Long Beach Comic Con, 2015

| • | Won |
| | Best WebSeries |

Los Angeles Independent Film Festival Awards, 2015

| • | Won, LAIFF February Award |
| | Best Web Series (English) Alan David Morgan |

New York Comic Con, 2015

| • | Won |
| | Best WebSeries |

Primetime Emmy Awards, 2016

| • | Won, Primetime Emmy | Source |
| | Outstanding Actress in a Short Form Comedy or Drama Series Patrika Darbo• For playing: "Margot Mullen". | |

Raindance Film Festival, 2014

| • | Nominated, Jury Prize |
| | Best Ensemble Web Series |
