= Dead Trigger (film) =

- Theatrical release poster
- Directed by: Mike Cuff; Scott Windhauser
- Written by: Heinz Treschnitzer; Mike Cuff; Scott Windhauser
- Based on: Dead Trigger by Madfinger Games
- Produced by: Marina Bespalov; Michael Tadross Jr.
- Starring: Dolph Lundgren; Autumn Reeser; Brooke Johnston; Chris Galya; Romeo Miller; Isaiah Washington
- Cinematography: Jonathan Hall
- Edited by: Simon Van Gelder
- Music by: Stephen Edwards
- Production companies: Aldamisa Entertainment; Tadross Media Group
- Distributed by: Saban Films
- Release dates: June 28, 2017 (Moscow International Film Festival); May 3, 2019 (United States)
- Running time: 91 minutes
- Country: United States
- Language: English

Dead Trigger is a 2017 American science fiction action horror film directed by Mike Cuff and Scott Windhauser, who were also both writers with Heinz Treschnitzer. The film is based on the mobile game of the same name. The film stars Dolph Lundgren, Autumn Reeser, Brooke Johnston, Chris Galya, Romeo Miller and Isaiah Washington.

The film was released in a limited release and through video on demand in the United States on May 3, 2019, by Saban Films, and was widely panned by critics.

== Plot ==
The film follows a world ravaged by a deadly virus that turns people into zombies. Unable to halt the outbreak, the government creates a video game called Dead Trigger to identify skilled players capable of combating the real-life undead. Captain Kyle Walker leads a team of elite soldiers and gamers on a mission to locate a group of scientists who may have developed a cure for the virus.

== Cast ==
- Dolph Lundgren as Captain Kyle Walker
- Autumn Reeser as Tara Conlan
- Brooke Johnston as Lieutenant Marchetti
- Chris Galya as Chris Northon
- Romeo Miller as Gerald "G-Dog" Jefferson
- Isaiah Washington as Rockstock
- Oleg Taktarov as Lieutenant Martinov
- Justin Chon as Daniel Chen
- Natali Yura as Naomi Shika
- Luciana Carro as Samantha Atkins
- Joel Gretsch as General Conlan
- James Chalke as Father Julian
- Jeff Lam as Eric Green
- Bleona as Natalie
- Tamara Braun as Gloria Russo
- Brandon Beemer as CSU Agent Pierce
- Tony Messenger as CSU Agent Sawyer
- Seira Kagami as Lika
- Alyona Chekhova as Nika
- Michael Kupisk as Zack
- Keil Oakley Zepernick as Subject Zero
- Derek Boone as Lieutenant Krycek

== Production ==
Writer-director Mike Cuff secured the film rights to the game in 2015 and began filming a live-action adaptation starring Dolph Lundgren and Isaiah Washington in Mexico in May 2016. Two days into filming Cuff left the production and Scott Windhauser, who had rewritten the screenplay with Dolph Lundgren, finished the film. Madfinger Games withdrew their support for the film, as the approved script was altered so radically. Cuff and Madfinger had no further participation in the film.

== Release ==
=== Theatrical ===
Dead Trigger first screened at the 2017 Moscow International Film Festival. The film was released theatrically and video-on-demand on May 3, 2019, by Saban Films/Lionsgate.

== Reception ==
=== Critical response ===
Bobby LePire of Film Threat gave the film four stars out of ten. It has a 5% rating on Rotten Tomatoes.

== See also ==
- List of films based on video games
