= Shawn Batten =

American actress

- Born: August 14, Kansas City, Missouri, U.S.
- Occupation: Actress
- Years active: 1994–2006; 2022
- Spouse: Steve Lukather (m. 2002; div. 2010)

Shawn Batten (born August 14), is an American actress most known for portraying Sara Cummings from 1997 to 1999 in NBC's soap opera Sunset Beach and Natalia Carlisle on Spyder Games (2001).

== Early life and education ==
Shawn Batten was born in Kansas City, Missouri, and grew up in Ramsey, New Jersey. She earned a BFA in theatre from Syracuse University.

== Career ==
Batten began her career with appearances in several commercials, off-Broadway plays, and television pilots. Soon after signing with William Morris Agency (now William Morris Endeavor), Batten worked as a production assistant for VH1 and MTV. She eventually landed the role of Sara Cummings in Sunset Beach. Batten stayed with the show until its cancellation in 1999. She then joined the cast of teen drama Spyder Games, where she played the leading role and appeared in 59 out of 60 episodes.

Batten made numerous guest appearances on TV series, with recurring roles on Beverly Hills 90210, The Sklar Brothers; Apt. 2F, and The Lone Gunman. She also had roles in feature films such as Academy Award Best Picture nominee Quiz Show, and award-winning indie films One Dog Day and Delinquent.

Besides a one-episode appearance on the short-lived Don Johnson series Just Legal in 2006 and several commercials and voiceover projects.

== Personal life ==
Batten married her longtime boyfriend, Toto guitarist Steve Lukather, in 2002. They had two children and divorced in 2010.

== Filmography ==
=== Film ===
Year	Title	Role	Notes
1994	Quiz Show	Cornwall Cousin	
1995	Delinquent	Tracy DeLors	
1997	One Dog Day	Karina	

=== Television ===
Year	Title	Role	Notes
1997	Apartment 2F	Brittany	2 episodes
1998	Beverly Hills, 90210	Officer Tammy Hansen	2 episodes
1998	Sunset Beach: Shockwave	Sara Cummings	Television film
1998–1999	Sunset Beach	Sara Cummings	243 episodes
2001	The Lone Gunmen	Nurse Marilyn	Episode: "Diagnosis: Jimmy"
2001	Spyder Games	Natalia Carlisle	65 episodes
2006	Just Legal	Sophie	Episode: "The Code"
