= Spyder Games =

American television series

- Genre: Soap opera
- Created by: Valerie Ahern; Christian McLaughlin
- Starring: Shawn Batten; Christina Chambers; Megalyn Echikunwoke; Byron Field; Monica Serene Garnich; Tori Falcon; Enrique Murciano; Jane Wiedlin; Mink Stole; Craig Robert Young
- Country of origin: United States
- Original language: English
- No. of seasons: 1
- No. of episodes: 65

Production
- Producers: Jason Shubb; Darren Wadyko
- Camera setup: Multi-camera
- Running time: 30 minutes

Original release
- Network: MTV
- Release: June 18 – September 20, 2001

Spyder Games is an American television series that was broadcast on MTV from June 18 to September 20, 2001. MTV's second and last foray into the soap opera format following the run of the anthology series Undressed, the series was originally called Spyder Web in development.

Originally intended for a 3 pm time slot, Spyder Games ultimately debuted at 7 pm because of its racy content. The final episodes, originally scheduled to air during the week of September 10, 2001, were postponed by a week because of continuous news coverage of the September 11 attacks, which MTV aired. The last episode was written as a cliffhanger, but MTV did not pick the series up for a second season. Until the premiere of Beyond the Gates in February 2025, Spyder Games was the last new American soap opera to debut on a traditional, non-streaming broadcast or cable TV network.

== Origins ==
In December 1998, MTV Series Development approached novelist and television writer Christian McLaughlin and his writing partner Valerie Ahern about developing a soap opera targeting the network's 12- to 24-year-old demographic. According to McLaughlin, "We wanted to do for soaps what Scream had done for horror films. That movie acknowledged and even spoofed the conventions and staples of slasher films while never forgetting it was one ... We wanted to distill everything people loved about soaps — the impossibly hot young characters and deliciously suspenseful melodrama — and eliminate all the things people hate: the glacial pace, the endless recaps and all that praying and crying." James Stanley and Diane Messina Stanley helped the show's creators by serving as Story Consultants before it debuted.

== Synopsis ==
The show centers on a wealthy video game-producing family and the unexpected murder of the patriarch, Boris Carlisle, who is in control of the company. A widower with four children (Natalia, Dmitri, Ivan and Sasha), Carlisle exhibits an irrational and unconcealed hatred (for apparently misogynistic reasons) for daughter Natalia, the sole Carlisle child interested in the success of the family's video game business, the titular Spyder Games. Carlsle instead places all of his interest and value in Dmitri, the oldest son, while second son Ivan's sensitivity is rewarded with Carlisle's barely concealed contempt. Youngest son Sasha, a teen much younger than his siblings, is superficially indulged.

Dmitri becomes romantically involved with Daphne, a fashion designer, but through mistaken identity is deceived into having sex with Daphne's conniving employee Taylor. Concealing a trailer trash past while working secretly as a call girl, Taylor then supposedly becomes pregnant with Dmitri's child. Ivan marries Julie Whitmore, the daughter of another wealthy local businessman, but then reveals he is gay as he is undeniably attracted to Francisco, a male houseguest in the Carlisles' home and one-time flame of Natalia's. Sasha pursues a career as a serious musician but is frustrated at being typecast as a teen idol in the style of Aaron Carter; indifferent and easily distracted, he breaks the heart of Cherish, a high school classmate with a hard crush on him who is also his most loyal fan. Meanwhile, Natalia struggles to conduct business at Spyder Games, constantly opposed and undermined by her father, who demonstrates many unscrupulous behaviors, both personal and professional. A host of additional characters move in and out of the Carlisles' dealings, including private investigator Jeff Northcutt, Taylor's ex-convict brother Lyle and Natalia's creepily devoted lackey Todd. Eventually Sasha is revealed to be Natalia's son instead of brother, fathered by Ivan's wife Julie's father when Natalia was about thirteen years old. As the episodes progress, a mysterious series of events lead to Boris' murder and the discovery of his severed head in a freezer.

== Cast and characters ==
- Shawn Batten as Natalia Carlisle
- J.R. Cacia as Dmitri Carlisle
- Christina Chambers as Taylor Jones
- Megalyn Echikunwoke as Cherish Pardee
- Byron Field as Ivan Carlisle
- Monica Serene Garnich as Julie Whitmore Carlisle
- Robert Hutchinson as Sasha Carlisle
- Enrique Murciano as Francisco Torres
- Nectar Rose as Daphne Wallace
- Bryce Mouer as Lyle Jones
- Zay Harding as Jeff Northcutt
- Alisa Reyes as Rocio Conejo

== Reception ==
Spyder Games was criticized for numerous reasons, not the least of which were visibly impoverished production values and questionable quality of acting performances.
