= Christian McLaughlin (television writer) =

American screenwriter (born 1967)

Christian McLaughlin (born September 29, 1967 in Houlton, Maine) is a television writer, producer, and author. McLaughlin is a graduate of Radio-Television-Film at the University of Texas. He gained notoriety in his early twenties with the publication of his novels, Glamourpuss and Sex Toys of the Gods.

== Television credits ==
McLaughlin worked as a script writer on:

- The Parent 'Hood
- Clueless
- The Crew
- Married... with Children
- Grown Ups
- The Bold and the Beautiful
- Brandy & Mr. Whiskers
- Drawn Together
- The Suite Life of Zack & Cody
- Desperate Housewives
- Hot Properties
- The Young and the Restless
- Jessie
- Corn & Peg

He served as a creative consultant for the 2004 Fox reality special Seriously, Dude, I'm Gay but the special was pulled from the schedule before airing following complaints from media watchdog GLAAD. McLaughlin responded to the criticism, saying, "It's unfortunate that a group as well-intentioned as GLAAD is going to set themselves up as censors and judge what other people should be allowed to air or see."

== Career ==
He met his writing partner, Valerie Ahern, at the University of Texas, and started writing sitcom spec scripts together a year later. Together, they created and produced MTV's Emmy nominated soap opera Spyder Games (originally called Spyder Web) after being approached by Drew Tappon at MTV Series Development; they are currently working with Maverick Television to create the first all-LGBT serial, San Rafael, for MTV's new gay channel, Logo. According to Logo, San Rafael is about "the unexpected schemes and twists in the intertwined lives of a group of LGBT friends and foes living in the same apartment complex." (The Advocate)

David Holman, then a production executive at Columbia Pictures Television, helped McLaughlin land an internship job at The Young and the Restless in 1989. His supervisor was Michael Minnis, then a script coordinator and writers' assistant. His internship included script synopsis of Y&R episodes and extras casting.

In 2014, McLaughlin's award-winning satirical play (with Stan Zimmerman) Meet & Greet was the breakout hit of the Hollywood Fringe Festival and ran for five months. The duo’s next stage comedy, Knife To The Heart, was performed in May 2018 at the Dorie Theater @ The Complex starring Andrea Bowen and Josh Zuckerman.

== Personal life ==
McLaughlin is openly gay.
