= Dave Ruby =

American actor

- Born: Massapequa, New York
- Occupation: Actor
- Years active: 1995–2004

Dave Ruby is an American actor. He is best known for his role as Zeke in the film Dead Man on Campus as well co-starring role in the UPN sitcom Grown Ups and his recurring role as Dr. Lloyd on Judging Amy.

== Career ==
Ruby's other television credits include Saved by the Bell: The New Class, Married... with Children, Boston Common, Bone Chillers, Guys Like Us, The Division, The Amanda Show as well as a recurring role on the TNT series Bull.

== Filmography ==
=== Film ===
Year	Title	Role	Notes
1998	Dead Man on Campus	Zeke	
1999	Random Acts of Violence	Travers	
2004	Breaking Dawn	Opie	
2004	A Night at Sophie's	Johnny	

=== Television ===
Year	Title	Role	Notes
1995	Saved by the Bell: The New Class	Heavy	3 episodes
1996	Married... with Children	Hummer	2 episodes
1996	Boston Common	Frat Guy #1	Episode: "I Thee Endow"
1996	The Jeff Foxworthy Show	Donald, pizza guy	Episode: "The List Is Strife"
1996	Bone Chillers	Buddy	5 episodes
1999	Guys Like Us	Dave	Episode: "Good Old Days"
1999–2000	Grown Ups	Gordon Hammel	22 episodes
2000–2001	Bull	Stubby Frye / Jeffrey Frye	9 episodes
2003–2004	Judging Amy	Dr. Lloyd	11 episodes
