= Valerie Ahern =

American television screenwriter and producer

Valerie Ahern is an American television screenwriter and producer.

== Career ==
She has written episodes for a number of animated and live-action television series since 1995, including The Young and the Restless (July 27, 2007 – July 7, 2008), Clueless, Desperate Housewives, Corn & Peg, The Suite Life of Zack & Cody, Drawn Together, Brandy & Mr. Whiskers, The Parent 'Hood, Renovate My Family, Hot Properties, Spyder Games (head writer) and The Crew.

Ahern has served as executive story editor for several episodes of Clueless and story editor for Married... with Children. She has also produced an additional five episodes of Hot Properties. Her writing partner is Christian McLaughlin.

Ahern was one of the senior writers of both Disney Channel series Jessie and Bunk'd.
