= Chris Galya =

American actor

- Occupations: Actor, voice actor, and model
- Years active: 2008–present
- Known for: Jessie
- Awards: Indie Series Awards for Best Supporting Actor (Comedy) (2015)

Chris Galya is an American actor. He is best known for his recurring role as Tony Chiccolini, the doorman and romantic interest of the title character, on the Disney Channel series Jessie in 2011.

== Career ==
Galya had a recurring role as Tony Chiccolini on the Disney Channel sitcom Jessie (2011–2015).

Following his work on Jessie, Galya appeared in independent films and web-based productions, including the comedy web series Acting Dead, as well as in genre films such as Dead Trigger and The Boonies.

In 2012, Galya was featured in a fashion editorial by DA MAN Magazine.

== Filmography ==
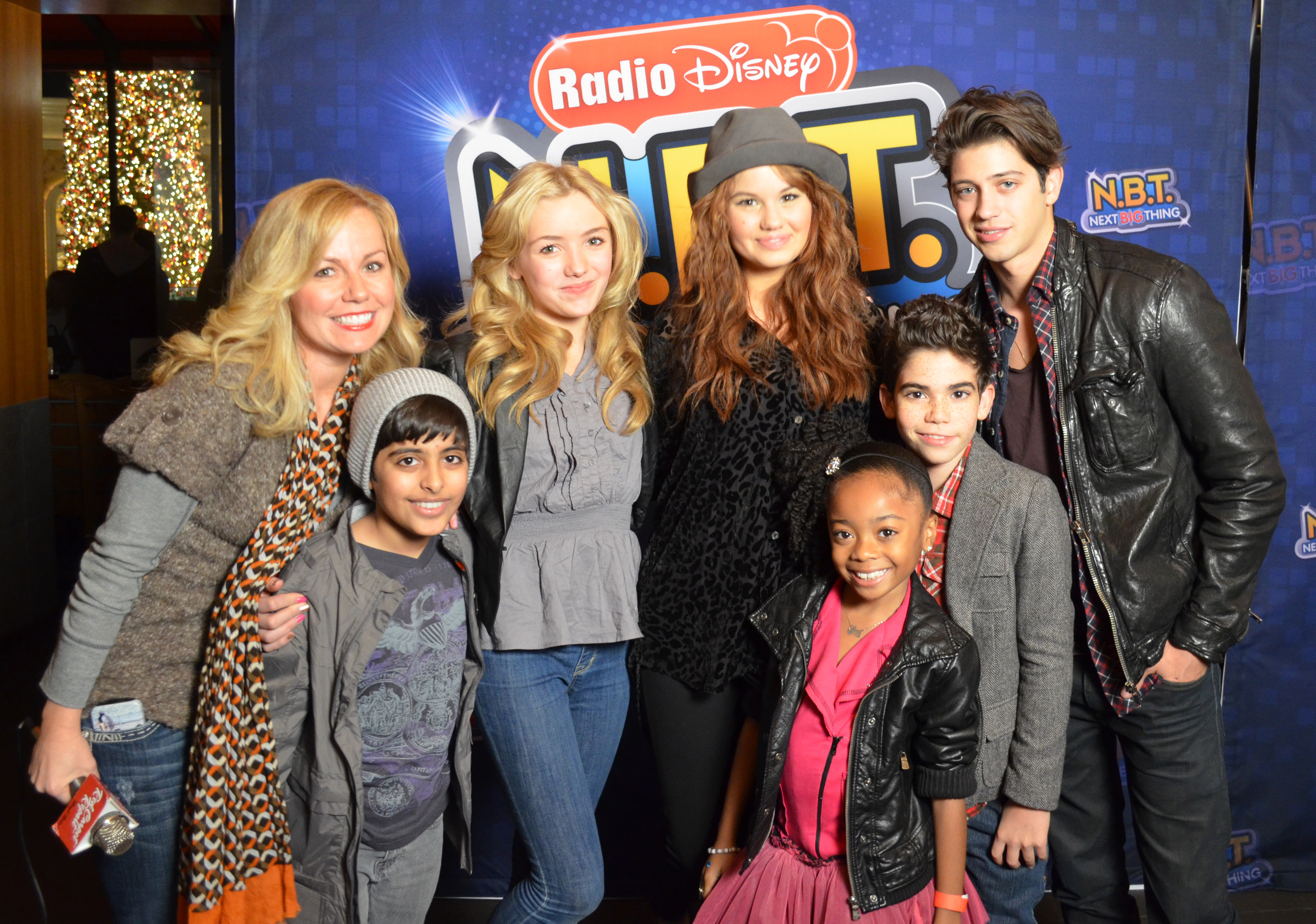
Jessie cast in 2011

=== Film ===
Year	Title	Notes
2008	Momma's Man	Independent film
2011	1313: Actor Slash Model	Horror film
2013	Isolated	Independent film
2017	Dead Trigger	Action film
2017	The Boonies	Independent film

=== Television and web ===
Year(s)	Title	Role	Notes
2011–2015	Jessie	Tony Chiccolini	Recurring role
2016	Acting Dead	Hunter Lee	Web series

== Awards and nominations ==
Year	Award	Category	Work	Result	Ref.
2015	Indie Series Awards	Best Supporting Actor (Comedy)	Acting Dead	Won	
