= Jessie (2011 TV series) =

American teen sitcom (2011–2015)

- Genre: Comedy
- Created by: Pamela Eells O'Connell
- Starring: Debby Ryan; Peyton List; Cameron Boyce; Karan Brar; Skai Jackson; Kevin Chamberlin
- Theme music composer: Toby Gad; Lindy Robbins
- Opening theme: "Hey Jessie" performed by Debby Ryan
- Composers: John Adair; Steve Hampton
- Country of origin: United States
- Original language: English
- No. of seasons: 4
- No. of episodes: 98 (list of episodes)

Production
- Executive producers: Pamela Eells O'Connell; Adam Lapidus
- Camera setup: Videotape (filmized); Multi-camera
- Running time: 22–25 minutes
- Production companies: It's a Laugh Productions; Bon Mot Productions

Original release
- Network: Disney Channel
- Release: September 30, 2011 – October 16, 2015

Related
- Bunk'd

Jessie is an American comedy television series created by Pamela Eells O'Connell that aired on Disney Channel from September 30, 2011 to October 16, 2015. The series stars Debby Ryan, Peyton List, Cameron Boyce, Karan Brar, Skai Jackson, and Kevin Chamberlin.

== Plot ==
The series follows Jessie Prescott, a young woman from a small town with big dreams of becoming a famous actress who, rebelling against her strict father, decides to leave the military base in Texas where she grew up and moves to New York City. She accepts a job as a nanny and moves into a multimillion-dollar penthouse on the Upper West Side, Manhattan with the wealthy Ross family.

The family includes jet-setting parents Morgan and Christina Ross and their four rambunctious children: Emma, Luke, Ravi, and Zuri, along with the family pet, Mr. Kipling, a seven-foot Asian water monitor lizard, that is later revealed to be a female. With a whole new world of experiences open to her, Jessie embarks on new adventures in the big city as she grows to rely on the love and support of the children in her care. Assisting her are Bertram, the family's lazy and sarcastic butler, and Tony, the building's 20-year-old doorman.

== Cast and characters ==
=== Main ===
Main characters of Jessie L–R: Bertram, Zuri, Luke, Jessie, Emma and Ravi (with his pet lizard Mrs. Kipling)

- Debby Ryan as Jessie Prescott, an idealistic and resourceful girl from the military base of Fort Hood, Texas. As a recent high school graduate rebelling against her strict father, who wanted her to join the army, Jessie moves to New York City to pursue her dreams of becoming an actress but, due to an unexpected turn of events, ends up becoming a nanny to the four Ross children. Even though at times both Jessie and the Ross kids annoy each other, they all deeply care for one another and Jessie is even shown to be sometimes overprotective.
- Peyton List as Emma Ross, a diva, somewhat ditsy, cynical girl, eager to reorder the world to the way she sees it. Emma is the oldest child of the Ross family, and Morgan and Christina's only biological child.
- Cameron Boyce as Luke Ross, a laid-back, flirty, and crafty boy who was born in Detroit and has a passion for video games, break-dancing, and causing mischief around the penthouse while also being sarcastic at times. He considers himself a "ladies' man", having taken a liking to Jessie in particular.
- Karan Brar as Ravi Ross, a gentle, intelligent and courteous boy, born and raised for ten and a half years in West Bengal, India, and the newest addition of the Ross family. He is imbued with the culture of his beloved homeland but is thrilled with his new life in the United States.
- Skai Jackson as Zuri Ross, a sassy, strong-willed, quick-witted and talkative girl who was brought to NYC from her birth country of Uganda. She is highly creative with a penchant for rainbows, unicorns, mermaids, and country music, and has many stuffed animals and imaginary friends. She is the youngest of the Ross children.
- Kevin Chamberlin as Bertram, the Ross family's butler. He is grouchy and often very lazy, begrudgingly helping Jessie navigate her job as nanny to the four Ross children.

=== Recurring ===
- Christina Moore as Christina Ross, the mother of the four Ross children and a former supermodel turned business magnate.
- Chris Galya as Tony, the doorman in the building where the Ross family lives who has strong feelings for Jessie and helps her navigate her adventures in the big city.
- Charles Esten as Morgan Ross, the father of the four Ross children and a famous movie director. The pilot episode reveals he is friends with George Lucas.
- Frank as Mrs. Kipling, (Note: Press releases stated "Ms. Kipling" while the actual episodes used "Mrs. Kipling".) the Ross family's house pet, a seven-foot Asian water monitor lizard that Ravi brought from India when he came to the US. In the first season, the lizard is known as Mr. Kipling.
- Carolyn Hennesy as Rhoda Chesterfield, the cold-hearted head of the city condominium board in the building where the Ross family lives. Her first spat with Jessie and the Ross clan involved Mrs. Kipling tearing her clothes up in the elevator. She dislikes anyone who is not rich, who is under 20, or who is less self-absorbed than herself.
- Josie Totah (Note: Credited as J.J. Totah.) as Stuart Wooten, a quick-witted, yet love-struck, kid. He has a huge crush on Zuri and is a good friend to the Ross brothers.
- Joey Richter as Officer Petey, a police officer who is obsessed with the performing arts, and really wants to be an actor.
- Jennifer Veal as Agatha, an unattractive, arrogant British nanny who frequently locks horns with Jessie and the Ross children. During their first meeting, she attempts to ban Zuri and Jessie from Central Park.
- Pierson Fode as Brooks Wentworth, Jessie's new boyfriend who later becomes Jessie's fiancé. He got a job in Africa and asked Jessie to get married as soon as possible. She decides to go with him but the kids become upset when they find out.

=== Notable guest stars ===
- Sierra McCormick as Connie Thompson, an insane girl with an obsessive crush on Luke. She appears in "Creepy Connie Comes a Callin'", "Creepy Connie's Curtain Call", and "Creepy Connie 3: The Creepening".
- Kelly Gould as Rosie, Emma's best friend who lives in a crime-ridden area of the city but is actually a nice girl. She appears in "Make New Friends but Hide the Old", "Trashin' Fashion", and "Kids Don't Wanna Be Shunned".
- Katherine McNamara as Bryn Breitbart, who appears in "Kids Don't Wanna Be Shunned", where she attempts to steal Emma's friends by pretending she is of Danish royalty. In "Diary of a Mad Newswoman", Emma forgives Bryn and they become coworkers on Ravi's school news show.
- Maia Mitchell as Shaylee Michaels, a successful Australian actress who befriends Jessie, casting her as her stunt double in her latest film in "Jessie's Big Break".
- Cheri Oteri as Ms. Falkenberg, Zuri's quirky but overly strict third-grade teacher, appearing in the episode "Teacher's Pest". Jessie serves as Ms. Falkenberg’s classroom aide.
- Chris Bosh appears as himself in "Say Yes to the Messy Dress". He keeps his stinky white socks from the tenth grade as a sign of good luck, even though Luke disagrees with him and tries to sabotage his chance to win a basketball game against the New York Knicks.
- Adam Sandler appears as himself in "Punch Dumped Love", making spare change. He claims he wants to go by his nickname "Thunder".
- Spencer Boldman as Ted, who appears in "Break-Up and Shake-Up" as one of Jessie's old boyfriends.
- Lulu Antariksa as Vic, who appears in "Break-Up and Shake-Up", where Tony trains her to become a doorwoman, causing Jessie to become jealous of them. In the end, Vic goes out with Jessie's ex-boyfriend Ted.
- Matthew Timmons as Max Bauer, Jessie's young agent who appears in "Caught Purple Handed", where he says that he is living in his mother's basement and has to pay her rent.
- Stefanie Scott as Maybelle, the new girl in the Ross's apartment building. She appears in "Hoedown Showdown", where she hog-ties Emma's new "soul mate" after he asks her out knowing Emma likes him.
- Lombardo Boyar as Boomer, Emma's new boss and Connie's uncle. He is shown as a hardworking and easily persuaded man while also annoyed with Connie's antics. He appears in "Snack Attack", "Creepy Connie 3: The Creepening", and "Help Not Wanted".
- G. Hannelius as Mackenzie, an actress Connie Thompson hired to scare Luke into believing that she wasn't creepy anymore after she went to boarding school. She appears in "Creepy Connie 3: The Creepening" where she has a psycho crush on Luke just like Connie.
- Lainie Kazan as Wanda Winkle, Bertram's estranged mother and is invited by Jessie to surprise him on his birthday. She appears in "Throw Momma from the Terrace".
- Jo Anne Worley as Mrs. Arthur, Nana Banana in "Zuri's New Old Friend".
- Michelle Obama appears as herself in "From the White House to Our House", where she is called by Zuri because Zuri wants her friend Taylor's mother to be home for Taylor's tenth birthday.
- Phill Lewis as Mr. Moseby, who appears in "Karate Kid-tastrophe", where it is revealed he became the New York Tipton's hotel manager after the events of The Suite Life on Deck.
- Francesca Capaldi as Madeline, who appears in "What a Steal" as a thief.
- Chris Paul appears as himself in "Basket Case", where he coaches Ravi.
- Meaghan Martin as Delphina, who appears in "Rossed at Sea Part 1". Zuri believes she is a mermaid.

== Production ==
=== Development ===
The series was created by Pamela Eells O'Connell, who had previous experience with the "nanny" sitcom formula, starting her career as a writer on the series Charles in Charge and serving as co-executive producer on The Nanny, before working with Debby Ryan on The Suite Life on Deck. O'Connell is said to have developed Jessie specifically to showcase Ryan's talent. In an interview with the Star-Telegram, Ryan explained how the concept originated: "(O'Connell) and I were throwing ideas back and forth when The Suite Life was coming to an end, and she came up with this. I was absolutely captivated. Then Disney looked at the script and the show runner (O'Connell) and myself and they were like: 'Awesome. We like it. You're on in the fall'". In interviews with Variety, Disney Channel President Gary Marsh spoke of working with Ryan again: "It's been thrilling to watch Debby grow from an unknown actress to one of our top stars. Debby is a talented young actress who connects to a wide fanbase because she's genuine, relatable and aspirational all at once. Our viewers have followed her from The Suite Life on Deck to 16 Wishes, and we're pleased to be working with her again." Jessie was the first main character to be engaged on the Disney Channel. There was a four-part episode about the engagement.

=== Casting ===
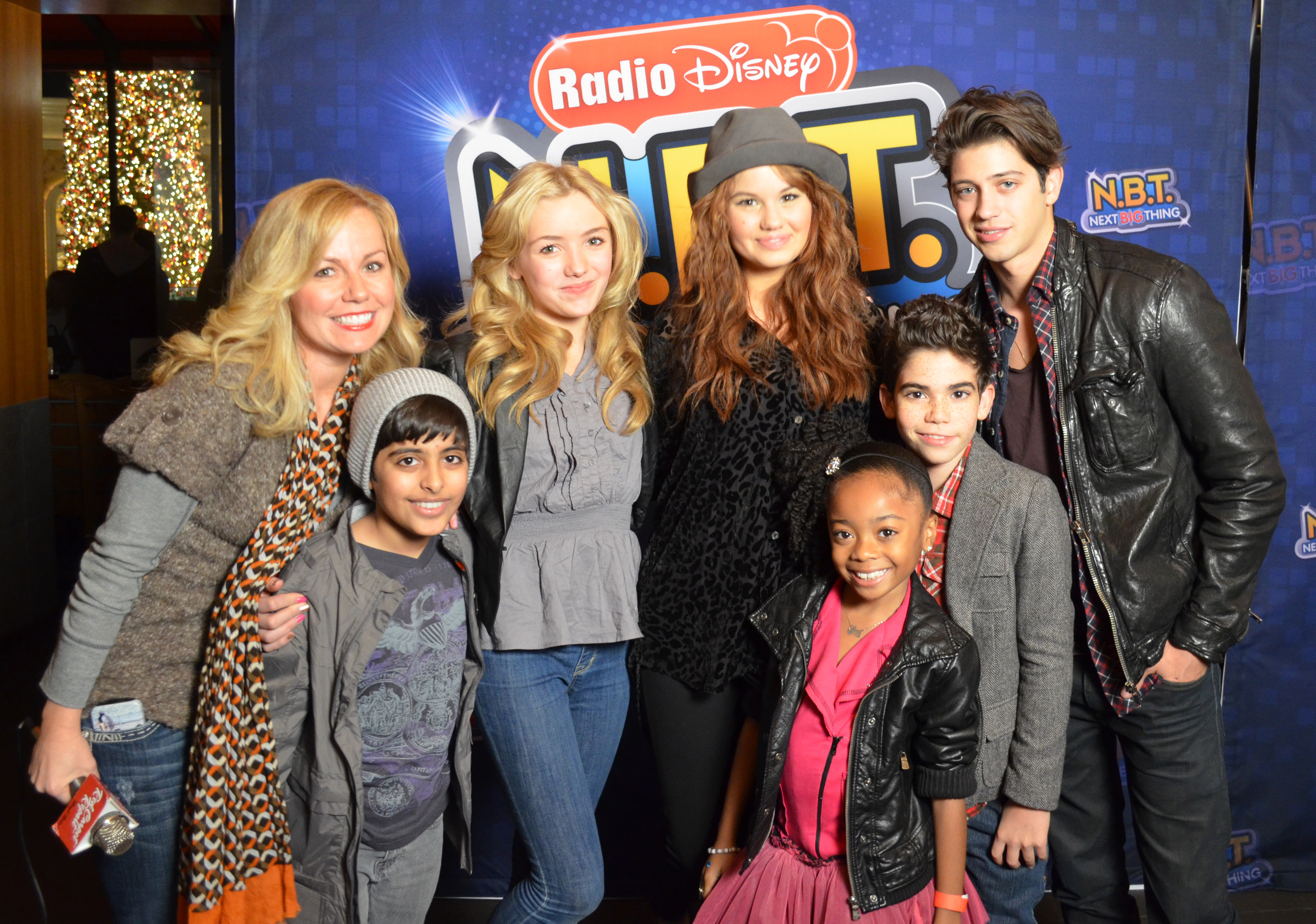
The cast in December 2011 (use cursor to identify)

With Ryan signed on, Disney Channel began the search to cast the Ross family in May 2011. Before casting was finalized, there were numerous differences in the original concept for several of the characters. The role of the mother to the Ross children was originally a photographer named "Pandora", the role of the oldest daughter, Emma, was originally named "Anabel", the role of Luke was originally a boy adopted from Korea named "Hiro", and the role of Ravi was originally a boy adopted from South America named "Javier" who had a pet capybara instead of a water monitor. Some have speculated that Brad Pitt and Angelina Jolie, as a prominent celebrity couple with a multi-cultural adoptive family, may have been one possible inspiration for the series. In an interview with the Boston Herald, O'Connell described her inspiration, saying: "I thought the celebrity parents and gorgeous penthouse would be glamorous, and a nice contrast to Jessie's more modest Texas roots. That fish out of water element makes for good stories, and I was inspired by many families who have adopted children of different ethnicities." The Ross parents are only shown in a few episodes throughout the series.

=== Filming ===
After casting was finalized and changes were made to several of the characters to suit the actors chosen, the series skipped the pilot phase and was put directly into production. Filming began in June 2011 on Stage 3/8 at Hollywood Center Studios which, prior to start of production, served as the sound stage where the Disney Channel series Wizards of Waverly Place was taped. 13 episodes were originally ordered for the first season, but while the show's first season was in production, Disney Channel ordered an additional seven episodes, bringing the total number of episodes for the first season to 20. When asked about the atmosphere on set during an interview with MSN TV, Ryan described her relationship with the young cast: "I definitely feel like a nanny! They are smart kids, but they're real kids. They like to have fun. My policy is: We can play hard, as long as we work hard, and because we work hard, we need to play hard." Filming on the series wrapped on February 22, 2015.

On March 28, 2013, the series was renewed for a third season, with production resuming in July 2013. Season 3 premiered on October 5, 2013. On April 16, 2014, it was announced that Jessie would get engaged in a four-episode arc that would conclude the season in the fall, marking the first time a Disney Channel lead character has gotten engaged.

The series was renewed for a fourth season on May 20, 2014. Production began in August 2014 for a January 9, 2015 premiere. On October 1, 2014, Peyton List stated that the fourth season would be the last season of Jessie. On January 9, 2015, Debby Ryan said that the fourth season will see the show go past its 100th episode and also see its fifth crossover with another Disney Channel show. She also stated that Jessie will end in early 2016.

On February 25, 2015, Disney Channel officially announced the series would end after its fourth season, bringing the series to a total of 101 episodes. On the same day, Disney ordered the first season of a spin-off titled BUNK'd, which stars Peyton List, Karan Brar, and Skai Jackson in their respective roles. 98 episodes of Jessie were eventually aired in the series as 6 of the 101 produced episodes were combined into 3 extended length specials for broadcast and video sales.

== Episodes ==
Season	Episodes	Originally released	
Season	Episodes	First released	Last released
1	26	September 30, 2011	September 7, 2012
2	26	October 5, 2012	September 13, 2013
3	26	October 5, 2013	November 28, 2014
4	20	January 9, 2015	October 16, 2015

=== Crossovers ===
==== Austin & Jessie & Ally All Star New Year ====
In November 2012, Disney Channel announced that the show would crossover with Austin & Ally as a one-hour special episode titled "Austin & Jessie & Ally All Star New Year". The episode aired December 7, 2012.

==== Good Luck Jessie: NYC Christmas ====
In October 2013, Disney Channel announced a crossover episode of Jessie and Good Luck Charlie called "Good Luck Jessie: NYC Christmas". In the episode, PJ (Jason Dolley) and Teddy (Bridgit Mendler) go to New York for Christmas Eve and stay with Jessie for Christmas due to a snowstorm. The episode aired on November 29, 2013.

==== Ultimate Spider-Man: Web-Warriors ====
The series crossed over with the Marvel/Disney XD series Ultimate Spider-Man: Web Warriors for a Halloween episode titled "Halloween Night at the Museum" on October 10, 2014.

==== Jessie's Aloha-Holidays with Parker and Joey ====
On November 28, 2014, Jessie shared its fourth crossover with the series Liv and Maddie in a special episode titled "Jessie's Aloha-Holidays with Parker and Joey", featuring Joey Bragg as Joey Rooney and Tenzing Norgay Trainor as Parker Rooney. This crossover put Jessie into a tie with Hannah Montana and Lilo & Stitch: The Series as the Disney Channel shows to have had the most crossovers. This was counted as a single one-hour episode of Jessie with Liv and Maddie characters, and was not a Liv and Maddie episode.

== Controversy ==
Due to backlash over jokes regarding a character with Celiac disease, Disney Channel did not broadcast "Quitting Cold Koala" on its originally scheduled date of May 17, 2013, replacing it with a rerun of "Kids Don't Wanna Be Shunned." "Quitting Cold Koala" did, however, appear on the Disney Channel website, "WATCH Disney Channel", and on "Disney Channel on Demand", the channel's video-on-demand service. On Facebook, Disney Channel announced, "We are removing this particular episode from our regular programming schedule and will re-evaluate its references to gluten restrictions in the character's diet". The edited version of "Quitting Cold Koala" aired on July 5, 2013, as part of a two-episode spectacular, with all gluten jokes having been removed in the revised version.

== Spin-off and international adaptation ==
On February 25, 2015, Disney Channel announced that a Jessie spin-off titled Bunk'd would begin production in the spring. The series would star Peyton List, Karan Brar, and Skai Jackson. The show premiered on July 31, right after the Disney Channel Original Movie Descendants.

In India, a Hindi-language adaptation of the show, titled Oye Jassie, premiered on Disney Channel on October 13, 2013. Like most adaptations, the episodes and characters are similar to the original.

== Release ==
The pilot episode of Jessie was released as a free download via the iTunes Store one week prior to its Disney Channel premiere. Making its official debut on the Disney Channel on September 30, 2011, the series became the network's most-watched premiere on a Friday since September 2008, when The Suite Life on Deck debuted. The premiere of Jessie ranked as the number-one telecast at 9:00 PM with a total of 4.6 million total viewers in the target demographics, scoring 2.3 million viewers among kids 6–11, 1.8 million viewers among tweens and teens 9–14, and 887,000 viewers among adults 18–49. The most watched episode of Jessie is "Star Wars" with 7.32 million viewers total and the least watched episode is "Basket Case" with 1.38 million viewers total.

== Broadcast ==
The series airs worldwide on Disney Channel. The series premiered on September 30, 2011, in Canada, on November 25, 2011, in Australia and New Zealand, and on December 17, 2011, in Singapore. It previewed on January 29, 2012, and premiered on February 17, 2012, in the United Kingdom and Ireland. It premiered on April 1, 2012 in South Africa. In Canada, the series premiered on Disney Channel on September 1, 2015.

== Reception ==
=== Ratings ===
Viewership and ratings per season of Jessie
Season	Episodes	First aired		Last aired		Avg. viewers (millions)
Season	Episodes	Date	Viewers (millions)	Date	Viewers (millions)	Avg. viewers (millions)
1	26	September 30, 2011	4.63	September 7, 2012	3.59	3.70
2	26	October 5, 2012	3.58	September 13, 2013	4.77	3.35
3	26	October 5, 2013	3.17	November 28, 2014	3.50	2.68
4	20	January 9, 2015	2.43	October 16, 2015	2.43	2.03

=== Accolades ===
Year	Award	Category	Recipient	Result	Ref.
2012	Young Artist Award	Best Performance in a TV Series – Supporting Young Actor	Karan Brar	Won	
2013	Young Artist Award	Best Performance in a TV Series – Supporting Young Actor	Karan Brar	Nominated	
2013	British Academy Children's Awards	Kid's Vote – Television	Jessie	Won	
2014	NAACP Image Award	Outstanding Performance in a Youth/Children's Program (Series or Special)	Karan Brar	Nominated	
2014	Kids' Choice Awards	Favorite TV Show	Jessie	Nominated	
2014	Kids' Choice Awards	Favorite TV Actress	Debby Ryan	Nominated	
2014	Teen Choice Awards	Choice TV Actress: Comedy	Debby Ryan	Nominated	
2014	British Academy Children's Awards	Kid's Vote – Television	Jessie	Won	
2015	Kids' Choice Awards	Favorite TV Show – Kids Show	Jessie	Nominated	
2015	Kids' Choice Awards	Favorite TV Actress	Debby Ryan	Nominated	

== Soundtrack ==
List of songs in Jessie
Title	Performer	Premiere episode
"Hey Jessie"	Debby Ryan	"New York, New Nanny"
"Hey Jessie and Can't Do It without You (Remix)"	Debby Ryan; Ross Lynch	"Austin & Jessie & Ally All Star New Year"
"Hey Jessie and Hang in There Baby (Remix)"	Debby Ryan; Bridgit Mendler	"Good Luck Jessie: NYC Christmas"
"Face to Face"	Debby Ryan; Ross Lynch	"Austin & Jessie & Ally All Star New Year"
"Those Texas Guys"	Debby Ryan	"One Day Wonders"
"Best Year"	Debby Ryan	"Why Do Foils Fall in Love?"
"We're Burning Up"	Jessie J	"Punch Dumped Love"
