= List of 2013 box office number-one films in Ecuador =

This is a list of films which placed number-one at the weekend box office in Ecuador during 2013. Amounts are in American dollars.

== Number-one films ==
Porcelain Horse became the highest-grossing film of 2013 despite never reaching #1.

#	Weekend end date	Film	Box office	Openings in the top ten
1	6 January 2013	The Hobbit: An Unexpected Journey	$253,786	
2	13 January 2013	Wreck-It Ralph	$526,516	Parental Guidance (#3)
3	20 January 2013	Wreck-It Ralph	$378,376	Gangster Squad (#5), Django Unchained (#6)
4	27 January 2013	Hansel & Gretel: Witch Hunters	$231,192	Lincoln (#4)
5	3 February 2013	Hansel & Gretel: Witch Hunters	$203,581	The Innkeepers (#3), Flight (#4)
6	10 February 2013	A Turtle's Tale 2: Sammy's Escape from Paradise	$139,668	What to Expect When You're Expecting (#6)
7	17 February 2013	A Good Day to Die Hard	$193,456	Tad, The Lost Explorer (#9), Flypaper (#10)
8	24 February 2013	Tad, The Lost Explorer	$135,552	
9	3 March 2013	Tad, The Lost Explorer	$135,289	Jack Reacher (#2), Greystone Park (#3)
10	10 March 2013	Oz the Great and Powerful	$524,833	Hitchcock (#7)
11	17 March 2013	Oz the Great and Powerful	$383,513	The Croods (#2), Here Comes the Boom (#3)
12	24 March 2013	The Croods	$351,402	The Cabin in the Woods (#3), Les Misérables (#5)
13	31 March 2013	G.I. Joe: Retaliation	$546,815	
14	7 April 2013	Jack the Giant Slayer	$346,505	Evil Dead (#4)
15	14 April 2013	Jack the Giant Slayer	$276,560	Trouble with the Curve (#5)
16	21 April 2013	Jack the Giant Slayer	$185,470	Oblivion (#2), A Few Best Men (#5)
17	28 April 2013	Iron Man 3	$1,481,236	
18	5 May 2013	Iron Man 3	$792,258	Mama (#2), Trance (#6)
19	12 May 2013	Iron Man 3	$406,392	Underground (#3)
20	19 May 2013	Epic	$254,833	Star Trek Into Darkness (#3)
21	26 May 2013	Fast & Furious 6	$445,861	
22	2 June 2013	Fast & Furious 6	$350,954	The Hangover Part III (#3), The Collection (#6)
23	9 June 2013	After Earth	$244,786	Anna Karenina (#8)
24	16 June 2013	Man of Steel	$799,630	Star Trek Into Darkness (#3)
25	23 June 2013	Monsters University	$697,640	
26	30 June 2013	Monsters University	$579,956	World War Z (#2)
27	7 July 2013	Despicable Me 2	$452,354	
28	14 July 2013	The Lone Ranger	$262,598	
29	21 July 2013	Pacific Rim	$307,385	Turbo (#2)
30	28 July 2013	The Wolverine	$376,978	Identity Thief (#6)
31	4 August 2013	The Smurfs 2	$467,937	
32	11 August 2013	The Smurfs 2	$325,227	Percy Jackson: Sea of Monsters (#2)
33	18 August 2013	The Smurfs 2	$193,460	Grown Ups 2 (#3), Red 2 (#6)
34	25 August 2013	Grown Ups 2	$126,329	The Great Gatsby (#4), The Pact (#7)
35	1 September 2013	One Direction: This Is Us	$165,259	The Heat (#3)
36	8 September 2013	White House Down	$71,741	
37	15 September 2013	The Internship	$66,273	
38	22 September 2013	Planes	$156,213	The Conjuring (#2), Elysium (#3)
39	29 September 2013	Dragon Ball Z: Battle of Gods	$139,822	We're the Millers (#2), Runner Runner (#6)
40	6 October 2013	We're the Millers	$122,651	Spring Breakers (#7), We Steal Secrets: The Story of WikiLeaks (#10)
41	13 October 2013	Gravity	$252,892	Pain & Gain (#5)
42	20 October 2013	Gravity	$148,278	Captain Phillips (#2)
43	27 October 2013	Cloudy with a Chance of Meatballs 2	$229,944	
44	3 November 2013	Cloudy with a Chance of Meatballs 2	$207,459	Insidious: Chapter 2 (#2), The Counselor (#4), Kick-Ass 2 (#6)
45	10 November 2013	Thor: The Dark World	$948,093	
46	17 November 2013	Thor: The Dark World	$572,151	This Is the End (#4), The Bay (#5)
47	24 November 2013	The Hunger Games: Catching Fire	$371,329	Zambezia (#3)
48	1 December 2013	The Hunger Games: Catching Fire	$199,430	Instructions Not Included (#3), Carrie (#4)
49	8 December 2013	The Hunger Games: Catching Fire	$105,080	Battle of the Year (#4), The Fifth Estate (#6), Jackass Presents: Bad Grandpa (#8)
50	15 December 2013	Saving Santa	$135,897	
No box office data for the weekend of 22 December 2013.
52	29 December 2013	Walking with Dinosaurs	$308,856	Frozen (#3)
