= Celebrity Big Brother 1 (American season) =

Coordinates: 34°8′40.12″N 118°23′20.71″W

- Season 1
- Celebrity Big Brother 1 logo
- Hosted by: Julie Chen
- No. of days: 26
- No. of houseguests: 11
- Winner: Marissa Jaret Winokur
- Runner-up: Ross Mathews
- America's Favorite HouseGuest: Ross Mathews
- Companion show: Celebrity Big Brother: After Dark
- No. of episodes: 13

Release
- Original network: CBS
- Original release: February 7 – February 25, 2018

Additional information
- Filming dates: January 31 – February 25, 2018

Season chronology
- Next → Season 2

Celebrity Big Brother, also known as Big Brother: Celebrity Edition, is a spin-off series of the American version of the Dutch reality television franchise Big Brother. This season aired during the winter of the 2017–18 network television season on CBS and was the second American Big Brother season to air outside the usual summer television season, the first being Big Brother 9 in 2008. Julie Chen returned as host, with Allison Grodner and Rich Meehan returning as executive producers. The series is produced by Fly on the Wall Entertainment in association with Endemol Shine North America. The first season premiered on February 7, 2018.

The promotional logo was released on December 20, 2017. The logo is similar to that used for Big Brother 19, with the word "celebrity" added. The first teaser was also released the same day. In January 2018 official photos of the house and backyard were released through a press release and an Instagram livestream with Julie Chen. On January 28, 2018, the official cast was announced during the 60th Annual Grammy Awards.

The first season officially concluded on February 25, 2018, when Marissa Jaret Winokur beat Ross Mathews by a final jury vote of 6 to 3. Ross was also later named America's Favorite HouseGuest.

On May 12, 2018, CBS renewed the spin-off for a second season.

== HouseGuests ==
The cast of Celebrity Big Brother 1 L–R: Metta World Peace, Brandi Glanville, Keshia Knight Pulliam, Ross Mathews, Shannon Elizabeth, Mark McGrath, Omarosa Manigault, James Maslow, Marissa Jaret Winokur, Ariadna Gutiérrez, and Chuck Liddell

The HouseGuests were revealed during a live pre-show of the 2018 Grammy Awards on January 28, 2018.

| Name | Age on entry | Notability | Residence | Result |
|---|---|---|---|---|
| Marissa Jaret Winokur | 45 | Broadway actress | Toluca Lake, California | Winner; Day 26 |
| Ross Mathews | 38 | Television host | Palm Springs, California | Runner-up; Day 26 |
| Mark McGrath | 49 | Singer and television host | Studio City, California | Evicted; Day 26 |
| Ariadna Gutiérrez | 24 | First runner-up in Miss Universe 2015 | Miami, Florida | Evicted; Day 26 |
| Omarosa | 44 | Former White House political aide | Jacksonville, Florida | Evicted; Day 26 |
| James Maslow | 27 | Big Time Rush singer and actor | Venice, California | Evicted; Day 24 |
| Brandi Glanville | 45 | Former The Real Housewives of Beverly Hills star (Note: Brandi Glanville previously participated on the twentieth season of Celebrity Big Brother in the United Kingdom, where she finished in 11th place.) | Los Angeles, California | Evicted; Day 24 |
| Metta World Peace | 38 | Former NBA player | Los Angeles, California | Evicted; Day 20 |
| Shannon Elizabeth | 44 | Actress | Cape Town, South Africa | Evicted; Day 17 |
| Keshia Knight Pulliam | 38 | Former The Cosby Show actress | Atlanta, Georgia | Evicted; Day 13 |
| Chuck Liddell | 48 | Mixed martial artist, UFC Hall of Famer | Calabasas, California | Evicted; Day 10 |

=== Future appearances ===
For the twentieth season of the regular edition Ross Mathews and Marissa Jaret Winokur began hosting an aftershow entitled Off the Block with Ross and Marissa. Marissa Jaret Winokur, Omarosa, Ross Mathews, Metta World Peace, and Mark McGrath all appeared in the second celebrity season; Omarosa hosted a Head of Household competition while Ross and Metta participated in a Power of Veto competition. Mark appeared in the recap episode as a special guest. In 2021, Omarosa competed on Big Brother VIP, the celebrity edition of Australian Big Brother.

== Episodes ==
| No. overall | No. in season | Title | Day(s) | Original release date | US viewers (millions) | Rating/share (18–49) |
|---|---|---|---|---|---|---|
Week 1
| 1 | 1 | "Episode 1" | Day 1 | February 7, 2018 | 7.27 | 1.8/7 |
The eleven celebrities enter the new Celebrity Big Brother House after being sequestered from the public for a week. Prior to the first Head of Household competition Julie Chen informed the HouseGuests she was holding an envelope with a random number inside, all HouseGuests were instructed to stand on a number between 1 through 11 and the HouseGuest standing on the winning number would be awarded immunity for the week. Omarosa was standing on the number five which was the winning number and was safe from being nominated for eviction this week.: Head of Household: (Award Squeezin’) The HouseGuests are tasked with holding onto a life size spinning trophy elevated in the air without letting go or falling off for as long as possible. The last HouseGuest holding onto their trophy after everyone else was eliminated would win the challenge and become the first Celebrity Head of Household.; During the competition several past Big Brother HouseGuests perform a Broadway-style musical number where Marissa is the first to fall off her trophy. James and Shannon become the last two in the competition after everyone else drops. Shannon wins the Head of Household competition after James falls off his trophy. Julie instructs the HouseGuests to grab a "celebrity gift bag" before going back inside the House and not to open them. She also informs them that one bag contains a special power allowing the holder to "recast" the role of Head of Household with someone else.
| 2 | 2 | "Episode 2" | Days 2–5 | February 8, 2018 | 5.49 | 1.4/5 |
When the producers inform the HouseGuests that it's time to choose who wants to open their bags, a small standoff occurs. However when Chuck is the first one to enter the Diary Room to say he wants to open his bag most of the women do too. Because more than one person wished to open their bag the Head of Household performed a random draw to decide who would open their bag. At the nomination ceremony Keshia was the winner and immediately opened her bag. She became the new HoH and immediately assumed HoH duties. She nominated Chuck and James for eviction.
| 3 | 3 | "Episode 3" | Days 6–10 | February 9, 2018 | 4.34 | 1.0/4 |
Following the nomination ceremony the HouseGuests competed in the Power of Veto ceremony. The competitors were the HoH, the two nominees, Ariadna, Shannon and Mark.: Power of Veto: ("The Four Sneezons Spiritual Spa") In this competition HouseGuests had to search for letters and take them back to their spelling station. Once the HouseGuest is satisfied with their word they must lock in their time. The HouseGuest that spelled the longest word correctly in the shortest amount of time will win the Power of Veto. Shannon was the winner. Shannon chose not to use the Power of Veto; On Day 10 by a vote of 7–1 with Omarosa voting to evict James, Chuck was the first one evicted from the house.
Week 2
| 4 | 4 | "Episode 4" | Day 11 | February 11, 2018 | 4.79 | 1.2/5 |
Following the eviction the HouseGuests compete in the next Head of Household competition.: Head of Household: ("Celebrity Bowlerina") The HouseGuests compete head to head in a bowling competition. The competing players must spin around twelve times to lower the barricade located on their bowling lane. Once lowered the HouseGuests has twelve seconds to bowl down the four pins in their lane before the barricade raises again. The first HouseGuest to bowl down all pins in their lane wins the round. Ross was the winner and became the new Head of Household.; During the competition Omarosa had a asthma attack and was hospitalized. The next day HouseGuests were informed of her hospitalization and it was announced that she would be returning to the house prior to the nomination ceremony. Following her return to the house on Day 11, Ross nominated Keshia and Omarosa for eviction.
| 5 | 5 | "Episode 5" | Days 11–13 | February 12, 2018 | 5.16 | 1.3/5 |
Following the nomination ceremony the HouseGuests participated in a live veto competition, live veto ceremony and live eviction.: Power of Veto: ("Now You Sea It")The HouseGuests will see a billboard containing an advertisement for a new cruise line. The answer will either be either "More", "Exactly", or "Less". The first HouseGuest to buzz in with the correct answer will win the round and choose the next two competitors to face off. The one to guess wrong or not answer at all will be eliminated. The last remaining HouseGuest will win the competition. Marissa was the winner and chose not to use the Power of Veto.; On Day 13 by a unanimous vote of 7–0 Keshia was evicted from the Big Brother house and became the second jury member.
| 6 | 6 | "Episode 6" | Days 13–14 | February 14, 2018 | 5.21 | 1.3/5 |
Following the eviction the HouseGuests competed in the next Head of Household competition: Head of Household: ("Get Your Putt Into Gear") The HouseGuests take turns playing rounds of golf. The HouseGuest who scores three holes-in-ones in the shortest amount of time wins Head of Household. Ariadna was the winner with a time of two minutes and eighteen seconds.; On Day 14 Ariadna nominated James and Shannon for eviction.
| 7 | 7 | "Episode 7" | Days 14–17 | February 16, 2018 | 4.38 | 1.0/4 |
Following the nomination ceremony the HouseGuests participated in the Power of Veto ceremony the competitors were the HoH, the two nominees, Ross, Omarosa, and Brandi: Power of Veto: ("Dining in the Dark") The competing HouseGuests must enter a dark room and find their seat. Once they find their seat eat the first course of their meal. Following that they must move on to the next room and find the next seat for that course. Once all four courses have been found they must turn on the lights. The HouseGuest that moves through all four rooms and turns on their lights the fastest will win the Power of Veto. James was the winner with a time of six minutes and twenty-four seconds. James received the Power of Veto and used it to remove himself from the block.; On Day 16, Ariadna named Mark as a replacement nominee. On Day 17, by a vote of 5–1, Shannon was evicted from the Big Brother house and became the third member of the jury.: Head of Household: ("Courtside Seats") (Note: This Head of Household competition began in Episode 7 on Day 17. However, completion was not broadcast on television until episode 8.) The celebrities must hold on and sit in their seat as long as possible. The last HouseGuest sitting in their seat will become the next Head of Household. The first three HouseGuests to drop from their seats will be on a slop only diet for two days.
Week 3
| 8 | 8 | "Episode 8" | Days 17–18 | February 18, 2018 | 4.91 | 1.2/5 |
Head of Household: ("Courtside Seats") For being the first three HouseGuests to drop from their seats, Metta, Ross, and Mark were put on a slop-only diet for 48 hours, which began after the competition. Omarosa won after more than an hour and a half.; On Day 18 Omarosa nominated Ross and Brandi for eviction.
| 9 | 9 | "Episode 9" | Days 18–20 | February 19, 2018 | 5.11 | 1.2/5 |
Following the nomination ceremony the HouseGuests participated in a special Power of Veto competition. For this Power of Veto America was allowed to vote between the Diamond Veto, Spotlight Veto, and the VIP Veto. America voted for the VIP Veto which allows the winner to use the veto once, twice, or not at all. If the winning HouseGuest chooses to use the Power of Veto to save one of the nominees they are also able to save the replacement nominee or the other nominee if they choose. The competitors in the competition were Brandi, Mark, Marissa, Metta, Omarosa, and Ross.: VIP Power of Veto: ("Invitation Only") When the competition starts the HouseGuests must race to grab their puzzle pieces. Once they have pieces they must race to the other end and begin to put the puzzle together. The first HouseGuest to successfully build their puzzle and press their button will win the VIP Power of Veto. The winner was Ross.; On Day 20 Ross used the VIP Veto to remove himself from the block. Omarosa then named Metta as the replacement nominee and Ross chose not to use the veto a second time. On Day 20 by a unanimous vote of 5–0, Metta was evicted from the house and became the fourth member of the jury.
| 10 | 10 | "Episode 10" | Days 20–21 | February 21, 2018 | 5.54 | 1.4/5 |
Following Metta's eviction the HouseGuests competed in the next Head of Household competition: Head of Household: ("Red Carpet Ride") In this competition when the horn begins the HouseGuests must try to get across their red carpet without touching the ground. If they touch the ground they must go back to the beginning and start over. When they reach the other side they must lock in their time. Throughout the round the carpets tighten and loosen to make the carpets easier and harder to cross. The HouseGuests competed in two rounds of three. The three HouseGuests with the three fastest times competed against each other in the final round. Brandi, James, and Mark competed in the final round. Mark was the winner and became the next Head of Household.; Mark nominated Brandi and Ariadna for eviction.
| 11 | 11 | "Episode 11" | Days 21–24 | February 23, 2018 | 4.60 | 1.1/4 |
Following the HoH competition the HouseGuests competed in the next Power of Veto competition.: Power of Veto: ("BB Celebrity Toy Factory") When the competition starts the celebrity competing must hit their buzzer to reveal an action figure. Once the action figure appears they must figure out whose mouth, eyes, and nose are on the action figure. When they think they have correctly matched the three they must hit their buzzer. If it is incorrect they must correct themselves or if it is correct they move onto the next action figure. Once the HouseGuest has four action figures figured out they must lock in their time. The HouseGuest who figures out all four action figures in the fastest amount of time wins the next Power of Veto. Ariadna was the winner with a time of 9 minutes and 10 seconds. Ariadna used the veto to remove herself from the block.; Mark named Marissa as the replacement nominee. Following the Power of Veto ceremony Julie informed the HouseGuests of the double eviction. On Day 24 by a vote of 3–1 Brandi was evicted from the house and became the fifth member of the jury. Following Brandi eviction the HouseGuests participated in the next Head of Household competition.: Head of Household: ("BB Auction") Julie will ask the competitors a question based on the BB Works of Arts viewed earlier that day. The answer is either true or false. If the correct answer is chosen they will receive a point. The HouseGuest with the most point at the end of 7 questions will be the next Head of Household. A tiebreaker was held between James and Omarosa. The answer this time was a number. The HouseGuest who got closest to the number without going over will win. If both HouseGuests went over the one closest will win. Omarosa was the winner and became the next HoH.; Omarosa nominated Marissa and Ross for eviction. Due to there only being six HouseGuests all HouseGuests were able to compete in the Power of Veto competition.: Power of Veto: ("Art-Rageous") The HouseGuests must enter the Big Brother house and look at the four paintings in the kitchen. They must then compare them to the other paintings in the house and figure out which paintings is an exact replica of one in the kitchen. When the HouseGuest thinks they have figured it out the must race back to the yard and lock in their guess. If incorrect they are out of the competition. Ross was the winner and received the Power of Veto. Ross used the veto to remove himself from the block.; Omarosa named James as the replacement nominee. On Day 24 by a vote of 2–1 James was evicted from the house and became the sixth member of the jury.
Week 4
| 12 | 12 | "Episode 12" | Days 24–25; Various (Note: The HouseGuests looked back over their time in the game on Day 24. Flashbacks were shown that featured content from the previous twenty-three days.) | February 24, 2018 | 3.54 | 0.9/4 |
Following James' eviction from the house the final five HouseGuests had time to think back on their time in the Big Brother house.: Head of Household: ("Rocky Mountain Fly") (Note: This Head of Household competition began in episode 12 on Day 25. However, completion was not broadcast on television until episode 13.) HouseGuests must step onto their skis and hold on. The skis will "fly" into the air and the HouseGuests must hold on as long as possible. If a HouseGuest falls off of their skis they will be eliminated. The last HouseGuest standing will become the next to last Head of Household of the season.
| 13 | 13 | "Episode 13" | Days 25–26 | February 25, 2018 | 5.21 | 1.4/5 |
Head of Household: ("Rocky Mountain Fly") Marissa was the first to fall followed by Ariadna, and then Mark. Ross was the last one standing and became the next Head of Household.; Following the HoH competition Ross nominated Ariadna and Omarosa for eviction.: Power of Veto: ("Get Your Story Straight") When the timer starts the competing HouseGuest must look at the supersized laptop. There are eight stories on the laptop however they are missing days. The HouseGuest must climb on the laptop and transport the day tiles from the search bar to match the correct event on the website. When they finish they must lock in their time by hitting the enter button on the laptop. The HouseGuest with the fastest time and most days correct will win the Power of Veto. Marissa and Ross tied with a total of 8 correct however because Ross finished faster with a time of five minutes and twenty-one seconds he was awarded the final Power of Veto of the season.; Ross chose not to use the veto effectively keeping his nominations the same. On Day 26 by a unanimous vote of 2–0 Omarosa was evicted from the house becoming the seventh member of the jury.: Head of Household: ("Hash It Out") In this competition Julie will read tweets from evicted HouseGuests over their time in the house, one of the tweets will be an incorrect statement. The competing HouseGuests must figure out who tweeted the incorrect statement. Each time the HouseGuests guess correctly the will get a point. The HouseGuest with the most points after eight rounds will win the final Head of Household of the season. Mark, Marissa, and Ross tied. In the tiebreaker Julie asked the HouseGuests a question. The answer was a number. The HouseGuest who got closest without going over became the next Head of Household. If everyone went over the one closest HouseGuest will become the next Head of Household. Marissa was the winner and became the final Head of Household of the season.; On Day 26 Marissa chose to take Ross to the final two evicting Ariadna and Mark who became the eighth, ninth, and final two members of the jury. Following this, the jurors had a chance to ask questions to the final two. The Jury then voted one by one on who they think should win the game. Marissa became the first winner of Celebrity Big Brother receiving $250,000 making Ross the runner-up who received $50,000. Ross was later named America's Favorite HouseGuest and received an additional $25,000.

== Voting history ==
Color key:

Winner
Runner-up
Head of Household
Nominated for eviction
Immune from eviction
Evicted

| | Week 1 | Week 2 | | Week 3 | | | Week 4 | | |
| | Week 1 | Day 11 | Day 14 | Day 18 | Day 21 | Day 24 (Note: There was a double eviction on Day 24. Following the first eviction, the remaining HouseGuests played a round worth of games — including HoH and Veto competitions and Nomination, Veto and Eviction ceremonies—during the remainder of the live show, culminating in a second eviction for the night.) | Day 25 | Day 26 | Finale |
|---|---|---|---|---|---|---|---|---|---|
| Head of Household | ~~Shannon~~ (Note: Due to the Gift Bag twist, Keshia opened her bag to reveal she had the "Recast” Power, dethroning Shannon, who then became immune from nominations for the round.); Keshia | Ross | Ariadna | Omarosa | Mark | Omarosa | Ross | Marissa (Note: Following the last Head of Household competition, all remaining HouseGuests with the exception of the HoH will become immediately nominated. The final Head of Household will then choose two of the three nominated HouseGuests and immediately cast the sole vote to evict.) | (None) |
| Nominations (initial) | Chuck; James | Keshia; Omarosa | James; Shannon | Brandi; Ross | Ariadna; Brandi | Marissa; Ross | Ariadna; Omarosa | (None) | (None) |
| Veto Winner | Shannon | Marissa | James | Ross (Note: The nature of this rounds's Power of Veto was determined by America's vote. America voted between the Diamond Veto (which allows the winner to save a nominee and choose the replacement nominee), the VIP Veto (which gives the winner the additional option of using the Veto twice; either on the replacement nominee or other original nominee) or the Spotlight Veto (which forces the winner to use the veto). America chose the VIP Veto.) | Ariadna | Ross | Ross | (None) | (None) |
| Nominations (final) | Chuck; James | Keshia; Omarosa | Mark; Shannon | Brandi; Metta | Brandi; Marissa | James; Marissa | Ariadna; Omarosa | Ariadna; Mark; Ross | (None) |
| Marissa | Chuck | Keshia | Shannon | Metta | Nominated | Nominated | Omarosa | Ariadna; Mark | Winner |
| Ross | Chuck | Head of Household | Shannon | Metta | Brandi | James | Head of Household | Nominated | Runner-up |
| Mark | Chuck | Keshia | Nominated | Metta | Head of Household | Marissa | Omarosa | Evicted (Day 26) | Ross |
| Ariadna | Chuck | Keshia | Head of Household | Metta | Marissa | James | Nominated | Evicted (Day 26) | Marissa |
| Omarosa | James (Note: Before the first HoH competition, the HouseGuests were instructed to stand on a number. The HouseGuest standing on the winning number would be awarded immunity that week. Omarosa was the winner and was immune from nominations for the week. Since she was immune, she became ineligible to compete in the HoH competition.) | Nominated | Shannon | Head of Household | Brandi | Head of Household | Nominated | Evicted (Day 26) | Marissa |
| James | Nominated | Keshia | Shannon | Metta | Brandi | Nominated | Evicted (Day 24) | | Marissa |
| Brandi | Chuck | Keshia | Mark | Nominated | Nominated | Evicted (Day 24) | | | Ross |
| Metta | Chuck | Keshia | Shannon | Nominated | Evicted (Day 20) | | | | Ross |
| Shannon | Chuck | Keshia | Nominated | Evicted (Day 17) | | | | | Marissa |
| Keshia | Head of Household | Nominated | Evicted (Day 13) | | | | | | Marissa |
| Chuck | Nominated | Evicted (Day 10) | | | | | | | Marissa |
| Evicted | Chuck; 7 of 8 votes to evict | Keshia; 7 of 7 votes to evict | Shannon; 5 of 6 votes to evict | Metta; 5 of 5 votes to evict | Brandi; 3 of 4 votes to evict | James; 2 of 3 votes to evict | Omarosa; 2 of 2 votes to evict | Mark; Marissa's choice to evict | Marissa; 6 votes to win |
| Evicted | Chuck; 7 of 8 votes to evict | Keshia; 7 of 7 votes to evict | Shannon; 5 of 6 votes to evict | Metta; 5 of 5 votes to evict | Brandi; 3 of 4 votes to evict | James; 2 of 3 votes to evict | Omarosa; 2 of 2 votes to evict | Ariadna; Marissa's choice to evict | Ross; 3 votes to win |

== Production ==
=== Development ===
After the first season of the British version of Big Brother proved to be a success in the ratings for Channel 4, the network collaborated with the BBC for the first British season of Celebrity Big Brother in aid of Comic Relief. The season ran for a condensed run of eight days and featured six British celebrities moving into the house used for the first British season. Due to the success of the first celebrity edition, a second season was ordered and shown exclusively on Channel 4 in November 2002. The celebrity version took a two-year break before returning for its third season in 2005, and became a regular staple alongside the regular British version. Starting with the third season, the show began to feature celebrities outside the United Kingdom alongside well known British celebrities. Many notable American celebrities have since taken part in the British version of Celebrity Big Brother. American actor Gary Busey took part in the fourteenth season in the summer of 2014 and became the first American celebrity to win Celebrity Big Brother in the United Kingdom.

An American version of Celebrity Big Brother has been speculated since 2002, along with a celebrity version of Survivor. In an interview, Julie Chen and CBS CEO Leslie Moonves revealed talks of a celebrity edition of Big Brother as far back as Big Brother 2. It was rumored that CBS was looking to air a celebrity edition in the fall after Big Brother 3 with radio personality Howard Stern speculated as a possible houseguest. Chen revealed that Paris Hilton had agreed to do it and Roseanne Barr initially agreed to take part, but then backed out. Barr would later take part in another celebrity spin-off of Big Brother called Big Brother: Celebrity Hijack in the United Kingdom in 2008, where she watched over a group of non-celebrity housemates for a day, set tasks and talked to them in the Diary Room.

Julie Chen announced on September 7, 2017, during a live double eviction episode of Big Brother 19 that Celebrity Big Brother would air sometime during the winter, before the twentieth season of Big Brother in the summer of 2018. CBS later confirmed via a press release that Julie Chen would return to host the new season, and Allison Grodner and Rich Meehan will be executive producers. The season will be produced by Fly on the Wall Entertainment in association with Endemol Shine North America.

On September 13, 2017, it was revealed by Chen that her husband, CBS chief executive Leslie Moonves, forced her to take a pay cut for the celebrity edition to happen. Moonves stated, "You shouldn't be expected to be paid as if it's a full series. It's a condensed version."

The format of the show remained similar to the American version of Big Brother. Competitions for Head of Household and Power of Veto had been confirmed to returned for this edition along with live evictions. On December 1, 2017, CBS revealed that the series would premiere on February 7, 2018, and wrap on February 25, 2018.

=== Series changes ===
Celebrity Big Brother was a condensed version of the game and would not last as long as a regular season of Big Brother, with episodes only shown over two weeks instead of three months. Unlike the parent series Jury members were not sequestered separately and were allowed to return to the outside world as well as watch the show. Beginning with an incident that led to a lawsuit in Big Brother 2 when HouseGuest Justin Sebik got drunk and threatened fellow HouseGuest Krista Stegall by holding a knife to her throat, there has been an alcohol restriction in the house. The alcohol restriction was lifted for the Celebrity HouseGuests. The space in the backyard was reduced to allow production to constantly perform construction for competitions but still allow 24/7 access for the HouseGuests. For the celebrity version of America's Favorite HouseGuest, the term Favorite Celebrity HouseGuest was also being used interchangeably. For the first time since the beginning of the American series, five players were featured in the season's finale night versus the usual three.

=== Broadcasts ===
The main television coverage of Celebrity Big Brother was screened on CBS during the winter of the 2017–18 network television season. CBS decided to schedule the spin-off during the February 2018 sweeps period to counterprogram NBC's coverage of the 2018 Winter Olympics. Episodes aired on Sundays, Mondays, Wednesdays, and Fridays with two special episodes on Thursday, February 8 and Saturday, February 24. Most episodes aired for one hour and aired from 8:00–9:00 p.m. EST; the Friday episodes and the season finale, however, ran for two hours each (from 8:00–10:00 p.m. EST). The live Internet feeds returned for the American version of Celebrity Big Brother as part of CBS All Access. Alongside the weekly shows on CBS, the companion series Big Brother: After Dark returned on Pop under the title Celebrity Big Brother: After Dark. The show provided live coverage nightly from inside the House.

==== International broadcasts ====
Promotional logo created for use in Australia that resembles the logo of Australian adaptation of Big Brother from 2012 to 2014.

Global announced on December 20, 2017, that the broadcaster had acquired the rights to air Celebrity Big Brother in Canada. Global has broadcast the American version of Big Brother since its launch in 2000. Nine Network confirmed they would air the season in Australia under the name Celebrity Big Brother U.S.. Nine created a special logo for the show resembling the eye logo of the ninth through eleventh seasons of Australian adaptation that previously aired on the network. Episodes were "fast-tracked" and available on their streaming service 9Now shortly after their American airing with televised broadcast on 9Go! starting February 11, 2018. Due to low ratings episodes were moved from the 9:30pm timeslot to 11:30pm effective February 14, 2018.

Endemol Shine also screened the season on their YouTube channel Big Brother Universe outside the United States. The program was not available on the platform in Africa, Australia, Brazil, Bulgaria, Canada, Germany, India, United Kingdom, and the United States due to existing contractual agreements in those territories.

=== Prize ===
The HouseGuests competed for the main grand prize of $250,000.

== Viewing figures ==
| # | Air Date | United States | | | | Source |
| # | Air Date | 18–49 (rating/share) | Viewers (millions) | Rank (timeslot) | Rank (night) | Source |
|---|---|---|---|---|---|---|
| 1 | Wednesday, February 7, 2018 | 1.8/7 | 7.27 | 1 | 1 | |
| 2 | Thursday, February 8, 2018 | 1.4/5 | 5.49 | 3 | 4 | |
| 3 | Friday, February 9, 2018 | 1.0/4 | 4.34 | 2 | 2 | |
| 4 | Sunday, February 11, 2018 | 1.2/5 | 4.79 | 1 | 4 | |
| 5 | Monday, February 12, 2018 | 1.3/5 | 5.16 | 3 | 3 | |
| 6 | Wednesday, February 14, 2018 | 1.3/5 | 5.21 | 2 | 2 | |
| 7 | Friday, February 16, 2018 | 1.0/4 | 4.38 | 2 | 2 | |
| 8 | Sunday, February 18, 2018 | 1.2/5 | 4.91 | 1 | 2 | |
| 9 | Monday, February 19, 2018 | 1.2/5 | 5.11 | 3 | 3 | |
| 10 | Wednesday, February 21, 2018 | 1.4/5 | 5.54 | 2 | 2 | |
| 11 | Friday, February 23, 2018 | 1.1/5 | 4.64 | 2 | 2 | |
| 12 | Saturday, February 24, 2018 | 0.9/4 | 3.54 | 1 | 3 | |
| 13 | Sunday, February 25, 2018 | 1.4/5 | 5.21 | 2 | 2 | |
