= James Maslow =

American actor and singer (born 1990)

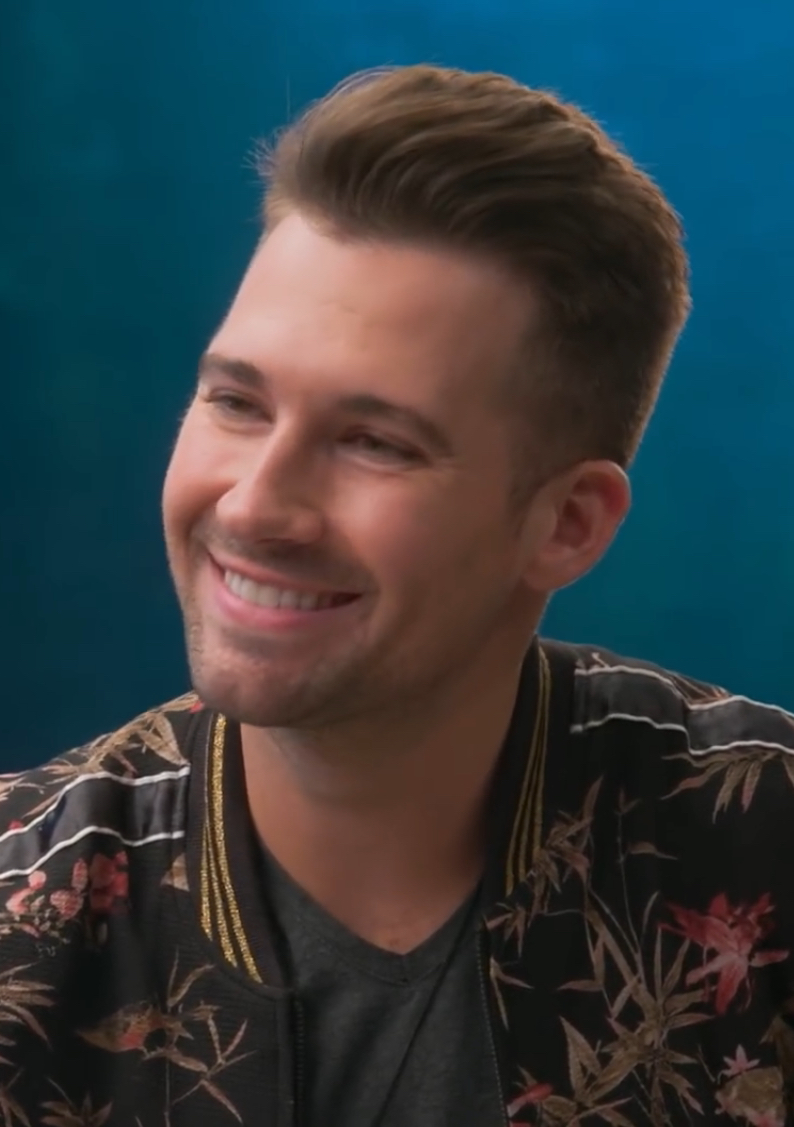
- Maslow in 2019
- Born: James David Maslow; July 16, 1990 (age 36); New York, New York, U.S.
- Occupations: Actor; singer; musician; dancer; model
- Musical career
- Genres: Pop; pop rock; rock; dance-pop; electro-pop
- Instruments: Vocals; piano; guitar
- Years active: 2008–present
- Member of: Big Time Rush

James David Maslow (born July 16, 1990) is an American actor, singer, dancer and model. He played the role of James Diamond on Nickelodeon's Big Time Rush, had roles in The Frozen Ground and Seeds of Yesterday, and is a member of the boy band Big Time Rush.

He also starred as Kevin Mohr on the Sony Crackle original series Sequestered.

In 2014, Maslow competed as a contestant on the eighteenth season of Dancing with the Stars, in which he reached fourth place. In 2018, Maslow was cast as one of the celebrity houseguests on the first American edition of Celebrity Big Brother where Maslow finished in sixth place.

== Early life ==
James Maslow was born in New York, New York, and raised in La Jolla, California. Born to a Jewish father and a Catholic mother, he was raised Jewish.

At the age of six, Maslow began training as a singer when his parents placed him in the San Diego Children's Choir. He attended La Jolla and Torrey Pines elementary schools, Muirlands Middle School, and San Diego School of Creative and Performing Arts (SDSCPA). He had a small role in the San Diego Opera's production of La bohème when he was 10 years old. He attended acting camp at the La Jolla Playhouse, and got his first agent when he was 14. At SDSCPA, he portrayed lead roles in select feature productions, including Danny Zuko in "Grease" (2004) and Marius in "Les Miserables" (2006). Maslow transferred from SDSCPA partway through the tenth grade, switching to Coronado School of the Arts (CoSA). He graduated from CoSA's musical theater department in 2007.

== Television and film career ==
=== 2007–2014: Nickelodeon and Big Time Rush ===
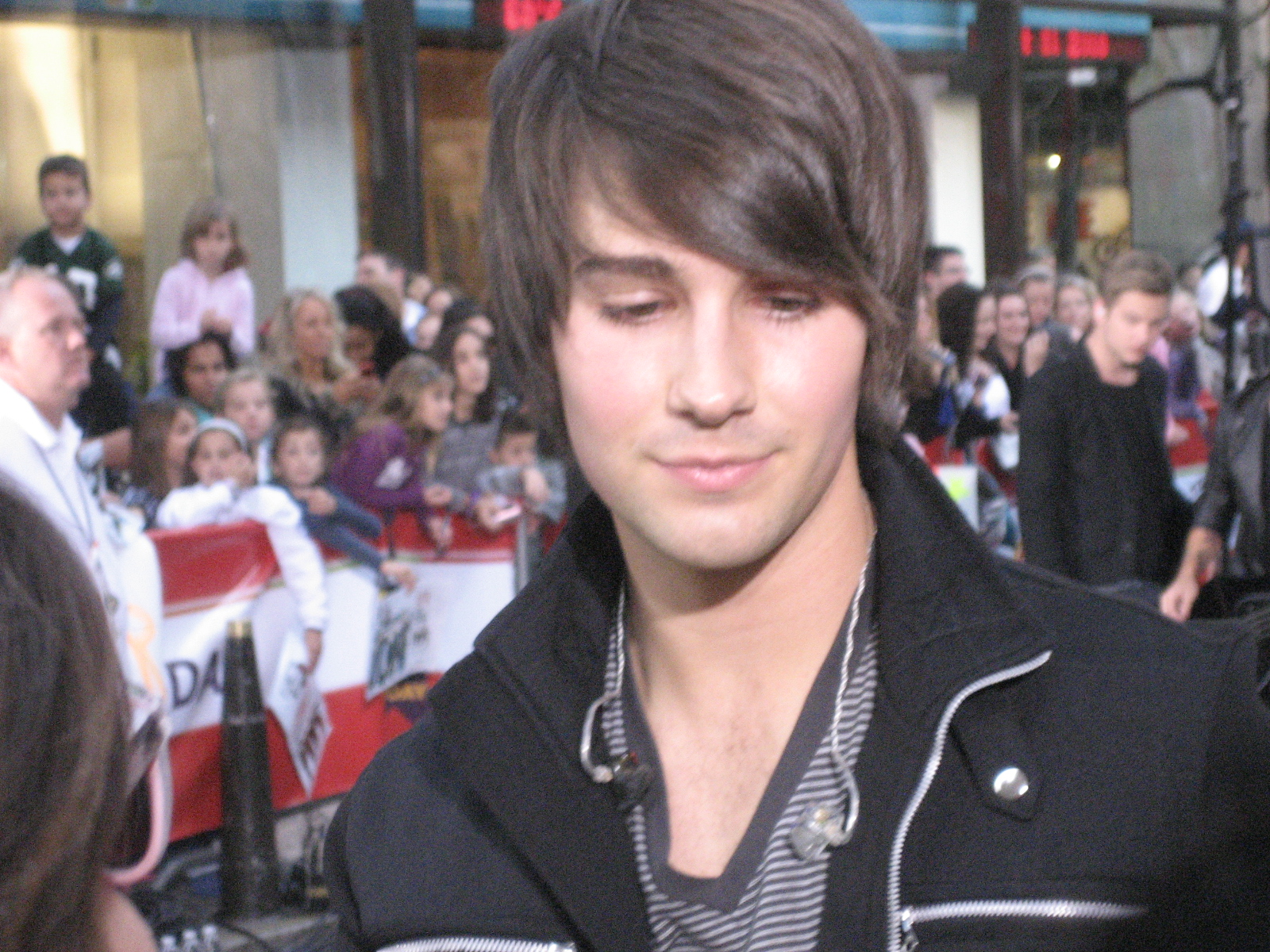
James Maslow in 2010

Maslow made his acting debut in 2008 as Shane in an episode of the Nickelodeon show iCarly. He also appeared in urFRENZ in 2009, Wild Things: Foursome in 2010, and Arena in 2011. In 2013, he appeared in The Frozen Ground as Daniel O'Brian. Also in 2013, he filmed an episode of See Dad Run, playing the role of actor Scott Baio's former TV son, Ricky. In 2007, Maslow sent his audition tape for a new Nickelodeon sitcom and received the role of James Diamond two years later in the show Big Time Rush, along with Kendall Schmidt, Carlos PenaVega, and Logan Henderson. They also formed the real boy band Big Time Rush

=== 2014–present: Dancing with the Stars and other roles ===
On March 4, 2014, ABC announced that Maslow would take part in the 18th season of Dancing with the Stars. He was paired with professional dancer Peta Murgatroyd. Ultimately, Maslow made it to the finals, but was eliminated on the first night. Maslow finished in fourth place, with an average score of 26.9 (excluding scores from guest judges). In a vote on Twitter, Maslow was nevertheless chosen "in a landslide" to perform an encore of his freestyle dance during the season finale. During his time on the show, Maslow earned the first perfect score of the season for his contemporary dance to "Let It Go" from Frozen on Disney Night. He featured on the cover of the July 2014 issue of FitnessRx Magazine.

Dancing with the Stars performances and results
Week #	Dance/song	Judges' score				Result
Week #	Dance/song	Inaba	Goodman	Guest^{1}	Tonioli	Result
1	Foxtrot / "Story of My Life"	7	7	—	7	No Elimination
2	Salsa / "Follow the Leader"	9	8	—	8	Safe
3	Jive / "The Middle"	9	9	9	9	Safe
4^{2}	Tango / "Dark Horse"	9	8	9	9	No Elimination
5	Contemporary / "Let It Go"	10	10	10	10	Safe
6	Quickstep / "You're the One That I Want"	9	8	9	9	Safe
7	Samba / "Gasolina"; Team Freestyle / "The Cup of Life"	9; 8	8; 8	9; 10	9; 9	Last to be called safe
8	Viennese Waltz / "6'2"; Celebrity Dance Duel (Jive) / "Ain't Nothing Wrong with That"	8; 9	9; 10	10; 10	9; 10	Last to be called safe
9 Semifinals	Cha-cha-cha / "Love Never Felt So Good"; Rumba / "Islands in the Stream"	10; 9	10; 9	10; 9	10; 9	Safe
10; Finals	Tango / "Adore You"; Freestyle / "Original Don"	9; 10	10; 9	—	10; 10	Eliminated

Also in 2014, Maslow was cast in the 2015 Lifetime television movie Seeds of Yesterday in the leading role of Bart Foxworth.

In 2018, Maslow competed in the first American season of Celebrity Big Brother where he was evicted on day 24.

In May 2019, it was announced that Maslow would be starring in independent film We Need to Talk, co-starring Emily Bett Rickards, and written and directed by Todd Wolfe.

== Music career ==
=== 2009–2014: Big Time Rush ===
After Maslow was cast for Big Time Rush television series, he was also a part of the real boy band Big Time Rush. An album of original songs from the first season plus some others was released October 11, 2010, entitled B.T.R. It sold 67,000 copies in its first week and was certified Gold by the RIAA five months later in March 2011. On November 21, 2011, the band released their second album called "Elevate" which sold over 70,000 copies on its first week. James Maslow and his bandmates co-wrote 8 out of the 12 songs. Maslow wrote "Elevate", co-wrote "Love Me Love Me" and the first single from the album, "Music Sounds Better With U". The UK version of the album included a bonus song called "Epic" which he also helped write.

Maslow and Big Time Rush have a third album called 24/Seven which was released on June 11, 2013. The band promoted the album with the tour shared with Victoria Justice called the Summer Break Tour. which began on June 21 and ended on August 15. On late Winter 2014, Maslow and the band went to their latest tour called "Big Time Rush Live 2014 World Tour", where they performed in Texas and 7 countries in Latin America.

=== 2015–2020: Solo career ===
He released his first single "Lies" on July 24, 2015. He has also released another single called "Circles" on October 23, 2015. In addition, he has two covers, "Cheerleader" and "One Call Away" available for purchase on iTunes. In 2017, Maslow debuted his solo album titled, How I Like It from which he has highlighted the single by the same name. Towards the end of 2017, James collaborated with director Joshua Schultz for his music video for the song "Who Knows", off his "How I Like It" debut album.

In 2018, Maslow released new singles "Falling" and "All Day".

Most recently, on April 26, 2019, Maslow released "Love U Sober" and announced that he is about to start releasing more singles.

=== 2021–present: Big Time Rush reunion ===
In 2020 during the COVID-19 pandemic, Maslow and the rest of Big Time Rush posted a video of them say to stay safe during quarantine. The next year Big Time Rush came out with a single called "Call It Like I See It" and did two shows in New York and Chicago. The next year in 2022 February 25, The Forever Tour came out and "Not Giving You Up"

== Filmography ==
=== Films ===
Year	Title	Role	Notes
2017	48 Hours to Live	Wyatt	
2017	Love Exclusively	Caleb	
2017	Art Show Bingo	Wil	Also associate producer
2018	Bachelor Lions	Mark Meyers	
2018	Room for Murder	Jake	
2020	My Boyfriend's Meds	Tom	
2021	Stars Fell on Alabama	Bryce Dixon	
2021	Ron's Gone Wrong	Bubble Employee	(voice)
2022	We Need to Talk	Scott Stewart	
2022	Wolf Hound	Captain David Holden	
2023	Stars Fell Again	Bryce Dixon	
2023	Holiday Twist	Sam	
TBA	Black Skies	Bolton	

=== Television ===
Year	Title	Role	Notes
2008	iCarly	Shane	Episode: "iSaw Him First"
2009–2013	Big Time Rush	James Diamond	Main role
2011	Hand aufs Herz	Himself	Episode: "August 11"
2012	How to Rock	Himself	Episode: "How to Rock: An Election"
2012	Big Time Movie	James Diamond	Television film
2012; 2013	See Dad Run	Ricky Adams	Episodes: "See Dad Wah-Wah'd" and "See Dad Campaign"
2013	Marvin Marvin	Himself	Episode: "Big Time Marvin"
2014	Dancing with the Stars	Contestant	Season 18
2014	Sequestered	Kevin Mohr	Main role
2015	The Penguins of Madagascar	Beaver James (voice)	Episode: "Tunnel of Love"
2015	Seeds of Yesterday	Bart Foxworth	Television film
2018	The Big Bang Theory	Bartender	Episode: "The Reclusive Potential"
2018	Celebrity Big Brother	Contestant	Season 1
2019	The Big Stage	Host	
2020	World's Funniest Animals	Guest	1 episode
2023	iCarly	Shane	Episode: "iReunited and It Felt Okay"

=== Web ===
Year	Title	Role	Notes
2015	Be Right Back	Maury McQuarrie	Main role
2016	Princess Rap Battle	Kristoff	Episode: "Rapunzel & Flynn vs. Anna & Kristoff"

== Discography ==
=== Studio albums ===
Title	Album details
How I Like It	Released: March 3, 2017; Formats: CD, digital download; Label: Membran

=== Singles ===
==== As lead artist ====
Title	Year	Album
"Lies" (featuring Unlike Pluto)	2015	Non-album single
"Circles"	2015	Non-album single
"Cry" (featuring City Fidelia)	2017	How I Like It
"How I Like It"	2017	How I Like It
"Who Knows"	2017	How I Like It
"Christmas Beautiful"	2017	Non-album singles
"Falling"	2018	Non-album singles
"All Day" (featuring Dominique)	2018	Non-album singles
"Love U Sober"	2019	Non-album singles
"Delirious"	2019	Non-album singles
"Did You Forget"	2019	Non-album singles
"Eyes"	2025	Non-album singles
"On My Mind" (featuring Maya Dadon)	2025	Non-album singles

==== As featured artist ====
Title	Year	Album
"Never Too Young" (MattyB featuring James Maslow)	2013	Non-album singles
"Now The Time Has Come" (Ringo Starr featuring Billy Valentine, Casey McPherson, Christian Collins, Colin Hay, James Maslow, Kirsten Collins, Maddi Jane, Richard Page and Wesley Stromberg)	2017	Non-album singles
"Brayton Be Faking" (Desmond Dennis featuring James Maslow)	2021	Non-album singles
"In My Head" (Lauren Mayhew and Eugene Ugorski featuring James Maslow)	2022	Non-album singles
"Crazy Talk" (Bryan Todd and Thomas Will featuring James Maslow)	2024	Non-album singles
"Where Do We Go" (Shiah Maisel and Mark F. Angelo featuring James Maslow)	2025	Non-album singles

=== Other appearances ===
Title	Year	Other artist(s)	Album
"Mirrors (featuring James Maslow)"	2013	Cimorelli	Best Of 2013

== Personal life ==
In May 2025, Maslow announced his engagement to long-time girlfriend, Caitlin.

Maslow has been a vocal supporter of Israel during the Gaza war, using his social media platforms to promote zionism. He spoke out against antisemitism, saying "anti-zionism is just anti-semitism".

== Awards and nominations ==
Maslow received a nomination in 2014 at the annual Young Hollywood Awards for hottest body which he lost to former Dancing With The Stars competitor Derek Hough. In the same year, Maslow again received recognition for his charitable efforts with the annual VH1 Do Something! "Celebs Gone Good Awards", though he failed to make the winners list as Taylor Swift had won that time for the third consecutive Year. In addition to these nominations, James Maslow was nominated as Favorite International TV Star at the Australian Kids Choice Awards in 2010 and also again in 2011. He has also been recognized with an Australian Astra Award nomination for Favorite International Actor or Personality at the 2011 event, but did not win. In 2014, Maslow along with cast and crew of the Sony Crackle drama series Sequestered received 2 International Academy of Web Television Awards (IAWTVA) for Best Drama Series and one for Best Ensemble Cast losing both bids. As a musician, in July 2017, Maslow was declared the winner of Macy's iHeartRadio Rising Star competition and opened the iHeartRadio Music Festival.
