= The Wizards Return: Alex vs. Alex =

- Promotional poster
- Genre: Fantasy, comedy-drama
- Based on: Wizards of Waverly Place by Todd J. Greenwald
- Written by: Ben Montanio; Vince Cheung; Dan Berendsen
- Directed by: Victor Gonzalez
- Starring: Selena Gomez; Jake T. Austin; Jennifer Stone; Gregg Sulkin; Beau Mirchoff; Maria Canals Barrera; David DeLuise; Ella Lentini
- Music by: Kenneth Burgomaster
- Country of origin: United States
- Original language: English

Production
- Executive producers: Selena Gomez; Dan Cross; David Hoge; Ben Montanio; Vince Cheung
- Producer: Greg A. Hampson
- Cinematography: Tom Eckelberry
- Editor: Cole Kennedy
- Running time: 59 minutes

Original release
- Network: Disney Channel
- Release: March 15, 2013

Related
- "Who Will Be the Family Wizard?"

The Wizards Return: Alex vs. Alex is a 2013 American television special based on the Disney Channel Original Series Wizards of Waverly Place. It was directed by Victor Gonzalez and filmed primarily in Disney Studios in October and November 2012. The full cast of the series starred in the special, except for David Henrie as Justin Russo, although the character was mentioned. The film focuses on the Russo family, Harper, and Mason visiting Italy for a family reunion while Alex created an evil twin in order to go there. The special premiered on March 15, 2013, on the Disney Channel in the United States, and attracted 5.9 million viewers.

== Plot ==
The Russo family, Harper, and Alex's boyfriend, Mason, arrange "another" congratulations party for Justin for taking over WizTech. A student named Dominic visits the family to inform them that Justin is too busy to get away from work, and flirts with Alex, which makes Mason jealous. Jerry announces a family reunion in Tuscany, Italy. Alex creates a portal between the villa in Italy and their loft back in New York to ease the travel, but Jerry scolds her for being immaturely selfish.

After a talk with Dominic, Alex tries to prove that she is not the irresponsible wizard she used to be by casting a spell to expel the negative parts of her personality, but accidentally creates an evil reflection of herself in a mirror. Evil Alex escapes the mirror and runs to Italy. Meanwhile, Max gets the attention of an Italian girl and tries to find her, unaware that she is his cousin, and Jerry and Theresa follow to get him back. They accidentally meet with their cousins and the reunion begins early.

Evil Alex shrinks and imprisons Max, Jerry, and Theresa with the help of another anonymous wizard, who is later revealed to be Dominic, the nephew of Gorog, the former leader of the Angels of Darkness. Harper and Alex follow them to the Leaning Tower of Pisa, where Harper is also captured. Dominic wants to use Alex's magic to capture all mortals in tiny beads through a spell replicator installed at the top of the tower so he can take over the world. When she refuses, Evil Alex goes to capture Mason.

To save her family, Alex goes through with Dominic's plan, activating his machine. Before she is able to turn on Dominic and reverse the spell, she is instantly transported away and found guilty of attempting to destroy the mortal world, with Dominic's twisted testimony. She is later saved by Mason who manages to destroy her jail cell. The two race back to the Leaning Tower of Pisa, where evil Alex and good Alex end up in a battle by magic and combat at the Russo house and the Jumbotron, while Mason fights Dominic. Alex manages to recover the bracelet from Evil Alex's hands.

When Dominic knocks out Mason, Alex is about to defeat him. Evil Alex and Dominic join forces against her, but she manages to destroy one of them and free her family. After that, Mason pushes Dominic off the tower to his death. Alex then gives up her powers to defeat her evil self, destroying the machine. In the end, Alex is given her magic back after accepting that she doesn't truly need it. The Russo family, Harper and Mason enjoy the rest of their family reunion before heading back to the Sub Station.

The movie ends with Alex telling Harper that they should have to stay in Italy for a while, due to Jerry and Theresa getting upset about their living room being destroyed as a result of the battle between Alex and her evil self.

== Cast ==
- Selena Gomez as Alex Russo / Evil Alex, the family wizard of the Russo family who uses her magical abilities irresponsibly and selfishly. Hoping to change for the better, Alex casts a spell on herself making her bad counterparts its own individual person. However, her evil counterpart attempts to take over the world, while her good part has to stop it.
- Jake T. Austin as Max Russo, Alex's dimwitted younger brother who is now a mortal due to losing the family wizard competition and the new owner of the Sub Station
- Jennifer Stone as Harper Finkle, Alex's mortal best friend who is aware of her magical abilities
- Gregg Sulkin as Mason Greybeck, Alex's werewolf boyfriend
- Beau Mirchoff as Dominic, Gorog's evil nephew who wants to take over the world
- Maria Canals-Barrera as Theresa Russo, Alex and Max's mortal mother who dislikes the use of magic
- David DeLuise as Jerry Russo, the patriarch of the Russo family, a former family wizard
- Ella Lentini as Francesca, the daughter of Jerry Russo's cousin Carmela

== Production ==
=== Casting ===
The majority of the cast of the Disney Channel Original Series Wizards of Waverly Place (except David Henrie as Justin Russo, who was mentioned) starred in the special.

=== Filming ===
The Wizards Return: Alex vs. Alex was filmed at Hollywood Center Studios in California, with background sets for the Italy scenes. The special was filmed from October 22 to November 10, 2012. This was an hour-long special, unlike Wizards of Waverly Place: The Movie, which was a feature-length television film.

== Release ==
The special premiered on Disney Channel as a TV special on March 15, 2013 in the United States.

International release
| Country / region | Channel | Premiere date | Source(s) |
|---|---|---|---|
| Australia | Disney Channel (Australia) | May 3, 2013 | |
| Ireland; United Kingdom | Disney Channel (UK & Ireland) | May 24, 2013 | |
| United States | Disney Channel | March 15, 2013 | —N/a |

== Reception ==
The episode was viewed by 5.9 million viewers on the day of its initial release. In the United Kingdom, the episode premiered with 575,000 viewers making it Disney Channel UK's third most watched episode ever.

== Home media ==
The special was released exclusively on DVD on June 25, 2013 in a release that included the hour-long final episode of Wizards of Waverly Place, "Who Will Be the Family Wizard?" as a bonus feature. The actual special was presented in its original 1.78:1 aspect ratio, with English, Spanish and French audio and subtitle tracks.

== See also ==
- List of Wizards of Waverly Place episodes
- Wizards of Waverly Place: The Movie
