= Art Show Bingo =

- Directed by: Matthew Fine
- Written by: Matthew Fine; Emile Husson
- Produced by: Jeffrey Fine; Vernon Guinn
- Starring: James Maslow; Ella Lentini; Jesse Pepe; Lillian Solange Beaudoin
- Cinematography: David Haycox
- Edited by: Mike Diller
- Distributed by: Indie Rights
- Release date: 10 November 2017
- Running time: 90 minutes
- Country: United States
- Language: English

Art Show Bingo is a 2017 American romantic comedy film directed by Matthew Fine and starring James Maslow, Ella Lentini, Jesse Pepe and Lillian Solange Beaudoin.

== Cast ==
- James Maslow as Will Hunter
- Ella Lentini as Rachel
- Jesse Pepe as Orrie Hunter
- Lillian Solange Beaudoin as Susan
- Carlo Sciortino as Manbun
- John Wilkins III as Lucien
- Eugenia Gonzales as Art Buyer

== Release ==
The film was released on 10 November 2017.

== Reception ==
Katie Walsh of the Los Angeles Times called the film "exceedingly pleasant, but shallow", and wrote that while it "might be sweet", it is "dramatically inert."

Frank Scheck of The Hollywood Reporter called the film "Likeable but slight" and praised Maslow and Pepe's performances, writing that their "attractiveness and charm go a long way toward making the proceedings palatable."
