= Ella Lentini =

American actress, writer, and filmmaker (born 1995)

- Born: Antonella Lucia Montes Lentini; March 23, 1995 (age 31); New York City, New York, U.S.
- Other names: Antonella Lentini; Ella Montes Lentini
- Education: The Beacon School
- Alma mater: New York University
- Occupations: Actress; writer; filmmaker; director; voice actress
- Years active: 2000 – present

Antonella Lucia Montes Lentini (born March 23, 1995), professionally known as Ella Lentini, is an American actress, writer, and filmmaker. She is best known for providing the voice and motion capture for the twin sisters Hannah and Beth Washington in the horror video game Until Dawn (2015), and for directing the short films Piece of Cake (2016) and Hemorrhage (2024).

Lentini's work frequently blends dramatic storytelling with political and social activism, focusing on LGBTQIA+ themes and reproductive rights.

== Early life and education ==
Lentini was born Antonella Lucia Montes Lentini in New York City on March 23, 1995. She is a first-generation American and the youngest of five children. Her father, Lino Lentini, was a renowned Sicilian custom tailor, and her mother, Jennifer De Lentini, is a Peruvian painter and former pageant model. Growing up in a highly artistic household, she discovered a passion for storytelling early, staging Charlie Chaplin-style plays for family friends as a child.

As a teenager, Lentini attended a weekend program at the Neighborhood Playhouse School of the Theatre. While attending the Beacon School, she became heavily involved in political and social activism, volunteering for humanitarian trips to South Africa and post-Hurricane Katrina New Orleans.

Lentini completed her higher education at New York University's Gallatin School of Individualized Study. Initially accepted for creative writing and photography, she ultimately developed her own self-directed Bachelor of Arts curriculum titled "Screenwriting as a Weapon". Concurrently, she trained professionally in acting under Anthony Abeson at a studio in Hell's Kitchen.

== Career ==
=== Acting ===
Lentini began her career as a child actor, making her screen debut under her birth name, Antonella Lentini, as a schoolchild in Ruth Sergel's 2000 short film Cusp. In 2010, she made her primetime television debut as Tina Harper in an episode of Law & Order: Special Victims Unit. Her early film credits include roles in the independent thriller Run It (2009), the drama Disconnect (2012), and the horror film Greystone Park (2012). In 2013, she portrayed Francesca in the Disney Channel television movie The Wizards Return: Alex vs. Alex alongside Selena Gomez.

Lentini's breakout role came in 2015 when she was cast in Supermassive Games' interactive horror title Until Dawn. She provided the voice and extensive motion capture performance for the pivotal dual roles of Hannah and Beth Washington, whose disappearance sets the narrative in motion. She later reprised her roles in the spin-off titles Until Dawn: Rush of Blood (2016) and The Inpatient (2018).

Her television profile expanded with a guest appearance as Brandy in the Fox drama series 9-1-1 (2018), followed by a seven-episode arc as Betty Rutherford on the long-running soap opera General Hospital in 2023.

In 2024, she expanded into unscripted media, hosting three episodes of the series Junebeam, and starred as El in the six-episode television drama Looking for Love.

=== Filmmaking and directing ===
As a filmmaker, Lentini focuses on highly visual narratives tied to social advocacy. She made her directorial debut with the 2016 short film Piece of Cake, which she also wrote and starred in as Alex. The film toured internationally on the festival circuit, concluding at HBO's Outfest, and successfully raised over $10,000 for an LGBTQIA+ non-profit organization. She followed this with several short projects, including Complex Human Seeks Similar (2019) and Until It's Safe (2020).

In 2024, Lentini wrote and directed Hemorrhage, a psychological thriller exploring a young couple traveling across state lines for medical care in a post-Roe v. Wade United States. The short film received significant acclaim on the independent circuit, netting her multiple awards for directing and social impact.

== Filmography ==
=== Television ===
Year	Title	Role	Notes
2010	Law & Order: Special Victims Unit	Tina Harper	Episode: "Gray"; credited as Antonella Lentini
2013	The Wizards Return: Alex vs. Alex	Francesca	TV movie; credited as Antonella Lentini
2017	Crude	Roxy Cotin	Episode: "The Great Heist"
2018	9-1-1	Brandy	Episode: "Stuck"
2023	General Hospital	Betty Rutherford	Recurring role; 7 episodes
2024	Looking for Love	El	Main role; 6 episodes
2024	Junebeam	Host	Talk/Variety series; 3 episodes
2026	Source Guy	Hannah	Episode: "Until Dawn"

=== Film ===
Year	Title	Role	Notes
2000	Cusp	School Kid	Short film; credited as Antonella Lentini
2009	Run It	Stoner Girl Two	Credited as Antonella Lentini
2011	Nevo	Julie	Short film; credited as Antonella Lentini
2011	Condition	Alaska	Credited as Antonella Lentini
2012	ZombleBees	Girl Bee	Short film; credited as Antonella Lentini
2012	Disconnect	Cassie	Credited as Antonella Lentini
2012	A12	Lexi	Short film; credited as Antonella Lentini
2012	Greystone Park	Antonella	Credited as Antonella Lentini
2013	7E	Kate	Credited as Antonella Lentini
2016	Piece of Cake	Alex	Short film; also writer and director
2017	Art Show Bingo	Rachel	
2017	Don't Let It Bring You Down	—	Short film
2017	Chasing Unicorns	Jo	Short film
2019	Complex Human Seeks Similar	Jade Trames	Short film; also writer and director
2020	Until It's Safe	Harper	Short film; also writer and director
2021	Conditionally	Ren	Short film
2024	Hemorrhage	—	Short film; writer and director only

=== Video games ===
Year	Title	Role	Notes
2015	Until Dawn	Hannah Washington / Beth Washington	Voice and motion capture
2016	Until Dawn: Rush of Blood	Hannah / Beth	Voice role
2018	The Inpatient	Hannah / Beth	Voice and motion capture
2024	Until Dawn	Hannah / Beth	Motion capture

== Awards and nominations ==
Year	Award	Category	Work	Result	Ref
2016	Best Shorts Competition	Award of Merit	Piece of Cake	Won	
2016	IndieFEST Film Awards	Award of Merit Special Mention	Piece of Cake	Won	
2017	FILM @ Downtown Urban Arts Festival	Best Film	Piece of Cake	Nominated	
2024	Indie Shorts Awards	Gold Award for Best Director	Hemorrhage	Won	
2024	LA Independent Women Film Awards	Best Human Rights Film	Hemorrhage	Won	
2024	Independent Shorts Awards	Best Acting Duo	Hemorrhage	Won	
2024	Independent Shorts Awards	Best First Time Female Director	Hemorrhage	Nominated	
2025	Independent Shorts Awards	Best Women Short	Hemorrhage	Won	
