= Celebrity Big Brother: After Dark =

- Genre: Reality television
- Country of origin: United States
- Original language: English
- No. of seasons: 2
- No. of episodes: 40

Production
- Executive producer: Allison Grodner
- Running time: 120–240 minutes

Original release
- Network: Pop (United States); Slice (Canada)
- Release: February 7, 2018 – February 13, 2019

Related
- Celebrity Big Brother (American TV series); Big Brother: After Dark

Celebrity Big Brother: After Dark (often shortened to CBBAD) is a spin-off of the American reality series Celebrity Big Brother, and is the celebrity version of Big Brother: After Dark. It premiered on the American cable channel Pop. The series began on February 7, 2018. Celebrity Big Brother: After Dark was announced on January 26, 2018 and has received its own title card and promotional videos. Throughout its first season a total of 18 episodes aired. The first season concluded on February 24, 2018. The series was renewed for a second season on December 26, 2018. The second season consisted of 21 episodes and ran from January 23 to February 13, 2019. The series did not return with the 3rd season of Celebrity Big Brother in 2022. It is unknown why but some say it could be due to the Viacom and CBS merger that took place in 2019.[3]

== Broadcast and features ==
New episodes began airing 12:00 AM Eastern Time with the exceptions of Tuesdays when it started at 11:00 PM and Fridays when it began at 1:00 AM. The episodes aired nightly in the United States on Pop and on Slice in Canada until 3:00 AM EST. The series follows the same format as Big Brother: After Dark which features live footage from inside the house. The show uses the same live feed footage available to 24/7 Internet subscribers, though the show's producers choose the camera angles and scenes within the program. For the second season new episodes air from 12:00–3:00 AM EST nightly beginning on January 23, 2019 for the duration of Celebrity Big Brother 2

== Series overview ==
Season	Episodes	Originally released		Celebrity Big Brother season
Season	Episodes	First released	Last released	Celebrity Big Brother season
1	18	February 7, 2018	February 24, 2018	1
2	22	January 23, 2019	February 13, 2019	2

== Episodes ==
=== Season 1 (2018) ===
No. overall	No. in season	Title	Day in house	Original release date
1	1	"Episode 1"	8	February 7, 2018
2	2	"Episode 2"	9	February 8, 2018
3	3	"Episode 3"	10	February 9, 2018
4	4	"Episode 4"	11	February 10, 2018
5	5	"Episode 5"	12	February 11, 2018
6	6	"Episode 6"	13	February 12, 2018
7	7	"Episode 7"	14	February 13, 2018
8	8	"Episode 8"	15	February 14, 2018
9	9	"Episode 9"	16	February 15, 2018
10	10	"Episode 10"	17	February 16, 2018
11	11	"Episode 11"	18	February 17, 2018
12	12	"Episode 12"	19	February 18, 2018
13	13	"Episode 13"	20	February 19, 2018
14	14	"Episode 14"	21	February 20, 2018
15	15	"Episode 15"	22	February 21, 2018
16	16	"Episode 16"	23	February 22, 2018
17	17	"Episode 17"	24	February 23, 2018
18	18	"Episode 18"	25	February 24, 2018

=== Season 2 (2019) ===
No. overall	No. in season	Title	Day in house	Original release date
19	1	"Episode 1"	8	January 23, 2019
20	2	"Episode 2"	9	January 24, 2019
21	3	"Episode 3"	10	January 25, 2019
22	4	"Episode 4"	11	January 26, 2019
23	5	"Episode 5"	12	January 27, 2019
24	6	"Episode 6"	13	January 28, 2019
25	7	"Episode 7"	14	January 29, 2019
26	8	"Episode 8"	15	January 30, 2019
27	9	"Episode 9"	16	January 31, 2019
28	10	"Episode 10"	17	February 1, 2019
29	11	"Episode 11"	18	February 2, 2019
30	12	"Episode 12"	19	February 3, 2019
31	13	"Episode 13"	20	February 4, 2019
32	14	"Episode 14"	21	February 5, 2019
33	15	"Episode 15"	22	February 6, 2019
34	16	"Episode 16"	23	February 7, 2019
35	17	"Episode 17"	24	February 8, 2019
36	18	"Episode 18"	25	February 9, 2019
37	19	"Episode 19"	26	February 10, 2019
38	20	"Episode 20"	27	February 11, 2019
39	21	"Episode 21"	28	February 12, 2019
40	22	"Episode 22"	29	February 13, 2019
