= Hello Ross =

American late-night talk show

- Genre: Late-night talk show
- Presented by: Ross Mathews
- Country of origin: United States
- Original language: English
- No. of seasons: 2
- No. of episodes: 26

Production
- Executive producers: Ross Mathews; Chelsea Handler; Tom Brunelle; Ray Giuliani
- Camera setup: Multiple
- Running time: 22 minutes
- Production company: Borderline Amazing Productions

Original release
- Network: E!
- Release: September 6, 2013 – May 16, 2014

Hello Ross is an American late-night talk show hosted by Ross Mathews. The show debuted on September 6, 2013, on E!. The show was executive-produced by Chelsea Handler, Ross Mathews, Tom Brunelle, and Ray Giuliani. The show was taped in front of a live audience. The show's premise was around popular culture and it included sections on celebrity topic discussion, audience participation, a pre-taped segment, and main guest interview.

On August 12, 2014, E! cancelled Hello Ross after two seasons.

== Episodes ==
=== Season 1 ===
Episode	Original airdate	Main guest	Topics discussed	Special segment	Notes
1	September 6, 2013	Sky Blu	One Direction documentary, Lady Gaga's iTunes concert	Real Housewives of Beverly Hills experience	Guest commentator: Nikki Boyer
2	September 13, 2013	Lance Bass and Joey Fatone			Guest commentator: Carrie Keagan
3	September 20, 2013	Kathy Griffin	Miley Cyrus twerking		Guest commentator: Damien Fahey
4	September 27, 2013	Gloria Estefan			Guest commentator: Nina Parker
5	October 4, 2013	Kris Jenner			Guest commentator: Ali Fedotowsky
6	October 11, 2013	Gwyneth Paltrow	Fergie encounter, Star romance or rumor?, Onscreen offspring	Celebrity BFF	Guest commentators: Nikki Boyer and Patti Stanger
7	October 18, 2013	NeNe Leakes	Jonas Brothers break-up, Having a blonde moment	Night of the Walking	Guest commentator: Nina Parker
8	October 25, 2013	Joe Manganiello	Dinner with Kris Jenner, Bootyful Bride, TMI Trick or Treats?	Dog Celebrity Look-a-Like Contest	Guest commentator: Suchin Pak
9	November 1, 2013	Kelly Osbourne	Halloween costumes, TV shows starring Ross	Bachelorette Bash	
10	November 8, 2013	Tori Spelling	Saved by the Bell, People's Choice New Talk Show Host nomination, Celebrity tattoos	Modern family: Red carpet boot-camp	
11	November 15, 2013	Leah Remini	People's Choice award nomination, Celebrity garage sales	Fabio Viviani Top Chef cookout	
12	November 22, 2013	Jeff Lewis	Victoria Beckham tweets, Caitlyn Jenner ponytail, Miley Cyrus eyebrows, Turkey 911	Who would play you in the movie of your life?	Guest commentator: Reza Farahan and Michelle Visage
13	November 29, 2013	Mel B	Celebrity fragrances, Kendall Jenner nip-pic, Lady Gaga Artpop, Beyoncé diet	Crafty Brewster: Celebrity cookie look a like, A very Rossy Christmas	Guest commentators: Jillian Barberie and Kendra G

=== Season 2 ===
On November 25, 2013, Jeff Olde, VP of Programming and Development for E!, announced that Hello Ross had been renewed for a second season, to air in early 2014. The first episode of Season 2 was aired on Friday, February 21, 2014. The last episode of the second season aired on May 16, 2014.

Episode	Original airdate	Main guest	Topics discussed	Special segment	Notes
1	February 21, 2014	Brandi Glanville	Miley Cyrus tour, The View host appearance, Sochi 2014 gay reject application]	Springer or Scandal	Guest commentators: Carrie Keagan and Nina Parker
2	February 28, 2014	Gabourey Sidibe	Oscar pre-party; The Roscars nominations; Gwyneth Paltrow 12 anniversary	Oscar's pictionary	Guest commentators: Lance Bass and Kendra G
3	March 7, 2014	The Bella Twins	Oscar post-party buzz;	Charm school boot camp with Lil Twist and Courtney Stodden	Guest commentators: Aubrey O'Day and D.J. Pierce
4	March 14, 2014	Candace Cameron and Mark Ballas	Adam Levine vine video; Dance Moms and snatching a wig; Yoga pussy video; Ross TV show spin-offs	Cookie Monster cake making	Guest commentators: Nikki Boyer and Kendra G
5	March 21, 2014	Kendall Jenner and Kylie Jenner	Theo James in the British are Coming; Long Island Medium approval; Jennifer Lopez I luv ya Papi; Golden Girls meets Lena Dunham character Hannah Horvath	Tween you and me; #Codo	Guest commentators: Alec Mapa and Morgan Stewart
6	March 28, 2014	Lisa Vanderpump	Shakira's muy fantastico album release; Little boy's bad language; Luis and Mijo get a new sister Audrey; Keeping up with Uncle Kippy Kardashian, the new family member;	Tamar Braxton b-day burger celebration	Guest commentators: EJ Johnson and Caitlyn Becker
7	April 4, 2014	Cody Simpson	My pussy looks like Ross; Captain Crunch cereal killer; Bieber and Selena engagement	Sir Ross at Medieval Times	Guest commentators: Lance Bass and Kendra G
8	April 11, 2014	Giuliana Rancic and Bill Rancic	#Howyoupooin with Wendy Williams; The Royals in NZ; It's a Girl B-day wish;	Ross gets America's Next Top Model Adrianne Curry wet while riding the Lindsay Lohan ride	Guest commentators: Theo Von and Patti Stanger
9	April 18, 2014	Dan Bucatinsky and Jeff Perry	Ross hosts the GLAAD Media Awards and gets a selfie with JLo; Beyoncé drops in Cochella; Snatching a #GucciCoochie;	Lady Gaga fan tattoo; Cher and the L.A Gay Chorus funeral for James Novak from Scandal	Guest commentators: D.J. "Shangela" Pierce and Jenni Pulos
10	April 25, 2014	Nikki DeLoach and Jillian Rose Reed	Ross meets The Voice coaches; Lesbian weddings; John Hamm has a #Hammaconda; Video OMG; MDNA skin care or Mayo lube;	Word-up with The Other Woman movie cast; #nachoproblem	Guest commentators: Jeff Dye and Kendra G
11	May 2, 2014	Mario Lopez	#whoanuts!; Mean Girls movie 10 year anniversary; #meimadeappopy vs. Me I am Mariah;	Hashtag it challenge; Spoiler no more, free TV device	Guest commentators: Kira Soltanovich and Alec Mapa
12	May 9, 2014	George Kotsiopoulos	Bradley Cooper no longer a Mini-Cooper; Hit me baby one more time, accidentally at work; #dancemomsaywhat; Avril Lavigne fan photos; Kim and Kanye wedding rumors	Is Ross competing for a part in the next Neighbors movie?; Musical Madness: Ross stars in the next movie to musical.	Guest commentators: Lance Bass and Kendra G
13	May 16, 2014	Lil Jon		Ross sister debuts on Hello Roz	Guest commentators: D.J. "Shangela" Pierce and Chris Farah
