= Ross Mathews =

American television personality

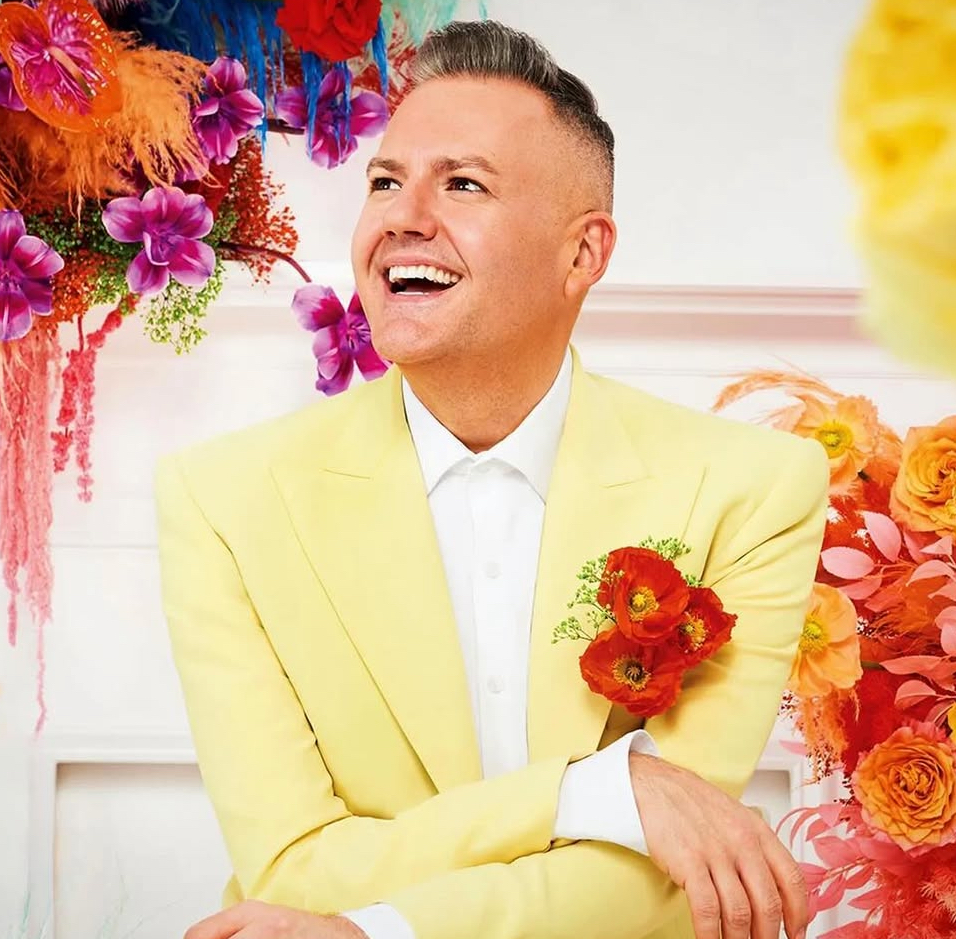
- Ross Mathews for The Knot in 2022
- Born: September 24, 1979 (age 47); United States
- Occupation: Television presenter
- Years active: 2001–present
- Website: helloross.com

Ross Mathews (born September 24, 1979) is an American television host and personality. He rose to fame as "Ross the Intern" as a correspondent for The Tonight Show with Jay Leno.

Mathews has appeared on Chelsea Lately, Celebrity Fit Club, The Insider, Celebrity Big Brother as well as his own talk show Hello Ross. Ross is currently an executive producer and judge on RuPaul's Drag Race and co-hosts The Drew Barrymore Show with Drew Barrymore.

== Early life ==
Ross Mathews was born September 24, 1979. He was raised in Mount Vernon, Washington, where he graduated from Mount Vernon High School and graduated from the University of La Verne, in La Verne, California, in 2002. He majored in communications and competed in speech and debate competitions.

== Career ==
Mathews began as an intern on The Tonight Show with Jay Leno. Beginning in December 2001, he covered movie premieres, the Academy Awards, two Winter Olympic Games, and other events.

Mathews has contributed commentary to the E! networks various 101... specials, and appeared as a weekly panelist on E's late night talk show Chelsea Lately. He appeared on the fifth season of VH1's reality television show, Celebrity Fit Club. During the course of the show, which premiered in April 2007, Mathews lost more than 40 lbs. (18 kg) and helped his team win the grand prize. He was also a guest host on The View on July 17, 2007. Mathews joined the E! Network's red carpet team, filling in for Ryan Seacrest as co-host with Giuliana Rancic for E! Live From the Red Carpet coverage of the 2011 Screen Actors Guild Awards, the 2010 Emmy Awards, the 2011 Golden Globe Awards, and the 2011 Academy Awards. He hosted Hello Ross, an interactive talk show on E! from September 6, 2013, until May 16, 2014.

Mathews joined the panel of judges for RuPaul’s Drag Race, beginning in 2015 for Season 7. Since 2022, he has served as an executive producer for the show and won an Emmy in 2023 for Outstanding Reality Competition Program.

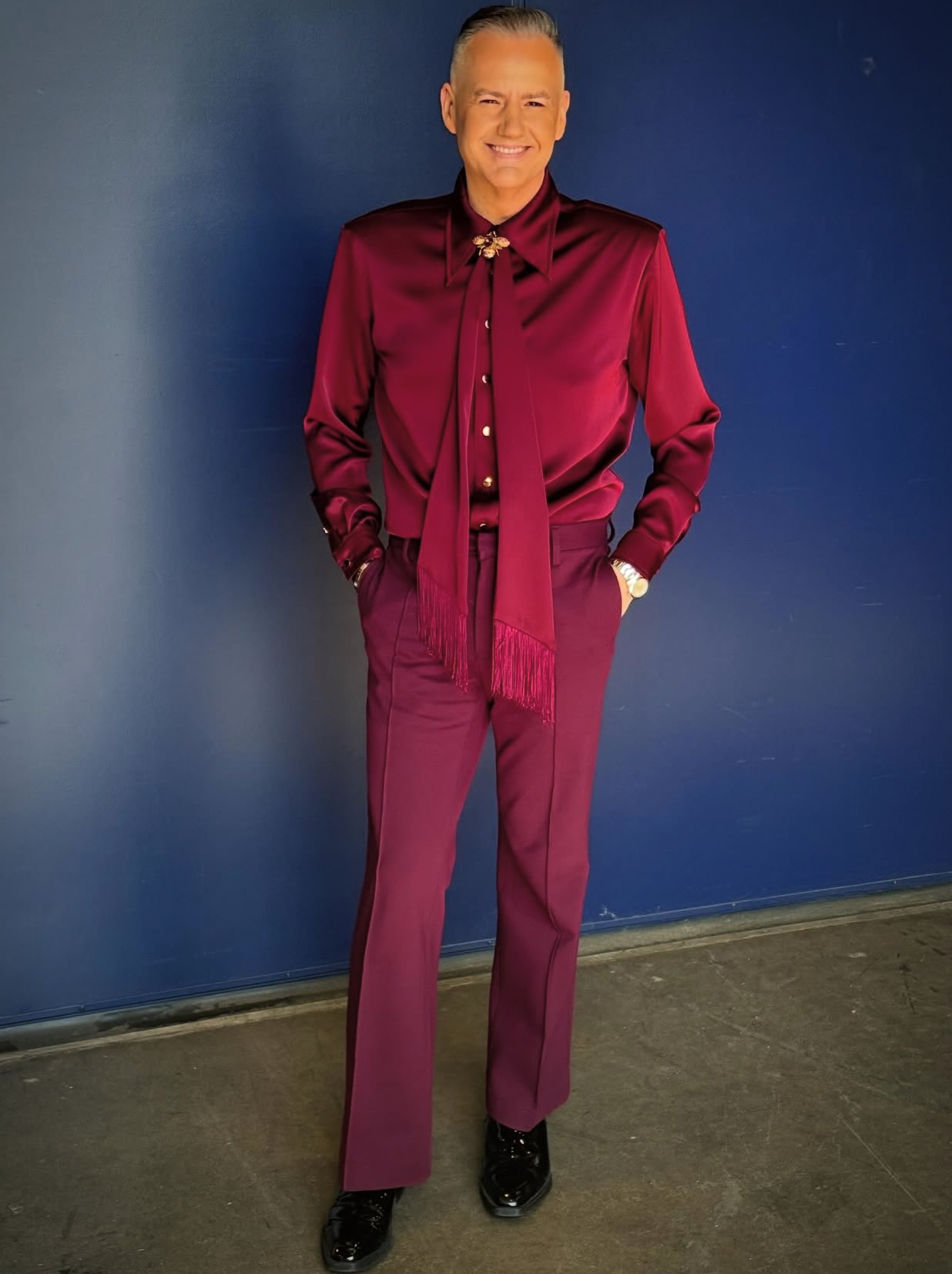
Ross Mathews on the set of RuPaul's Drag Race

Ross has written three books. On May 7, 2013, Mathews released his book Man Up! Tales of My Delusional Self-Confidence. On February 4, 2020 he released Name Drop: The Really Good Celebrity Stories I Usually Only Tell at Happy Hour. In 2025 he released Tío and Tío: The Ring Bearers, co-written with his husband, Dr. Wellinthon García-Mathews.

In 2018, Mathews was announced as one of the eleven houseguests competing on the first American edition of Celebrity Big Brother. He finished in 2nd place, winning $50,000, and was voted as America's Favorite Houseguest earning an additional prize of $25,000. He appeared in the second season as part of a Head of Household competition.

Since late 2020, he has appeared as a co-host on The Drew Barrymore Show.

In 2026, he was selected to host the Awards Gala of 11th Critics' Choice Documentary Awards.

== Personal life ==
Mathews is openly gay. From 2008 to 2018, he had a relationship with stylist Salvador Camarena.

On February 23, 2021, Mathews announced his engagement to Wellinthon García, a Long Island educational administrator. On May 7, 2022, Mathews and García married at a ceremony in Puerto Vallarta, Mexico.

== Filmography ==
=== Film ===
- The Bitch Who Stole Christmas (2021)

=== Television ===
Year	Title	Role	Notes
2006–2013	The Tonight Show with Jay Leno	Himself	Correspondent (62 episodes)
2007	Celebrity Fit Club	Contestant	Season 5 (8 episodes)
2008–2011	Days of Our Lives	Chris	
2012	Interior Therapy with Jeff Lewis	Himself	Guest (1 episode)
2012	RuPaul's Drag Race	Himself	Guest Judge (1 episode)
2015–present	RuPaul's Drag Race	Main Judge	Season 7–present
2012–2016	RuPaul's Drag Race All Stars	Himself	Guest Judge (4 episodes)
2018–present	RuPaul's Drag Race All Stars	Main Judge	Season 3–present
2018	Miss America 2019	Co-host	
2018	Celebrity Big Brother	Contestant	Season 1, Runner-up (13 episodes)
2019	Celebrity Big Brother	Guest	Season 2 (1 episode)
2020–present	The Drew Barrymore Show	Himself	"Drew's News"
2021	Adorableness	Co-host	Season 1
2023	And Just Like That...	Himself	Episode: "February 14th"
2024	RuPaul's Drag Race Global All Stars	Guest Judge	Episode: "Everybody Say Love Girl Groups"
2026	Big Brother: Unlocked	Himself	Guest (1 episode)

== Bibliography ==
- Mathews, Ross (2013). Man Up!: Tales of My Delusional Self. Grand Central Publishing. ISBN 978-1455512560.
- Mathews, Ross (2020). Name Drop. Simon & Schuster. ISBN 97-81797101484.

== Awards and nominations ==
=== Emmy Awards ===
Year	Award	Category	Work	Result	Ref.
2020	Daytime Emmy Award	Outstanding Interactive Media for a Daytime Program	93rd Annual Macy's Thanksgiving Day Parade	Nominated	
2023	Primetime Emmy Award	Outstanding Reality Competition Program	RuPaul's Drag Race (as producer)	Won	
2024	Primetime Emmy Award	Outstanding Reality Competition Program	RuPaul's Drag Race (as producer)	Nominated	
2025	Primetime Emmy Award	Outstanding Reality Competition Program	RuPaul's Drag Race (as producer)	Nominated	

=== Producers Guild of America Awards ===
Year	Category	Work	Result	Ref.
2022	Outstanding Producer of Game & Competition Television	RuPaul's Drag Race	Won	
2023	Outstanding Producer of Game & Competition Television	RuPaul's Drag Race All Stars	Nominated	
2024	Outstanding Producer of Game & Competition Television	RuPaul's Drag Race	Won	
2025	Outstanding Producer of Game & Competition Television	RuPaul's Drag Race	Nominated	

=== Miscellaneous awards and honors ===
Year	Award	Category	Work	Result	Ref.
2014	People's Choice Award	Favorite New Talk Show Host	Hello Ross	Nominated	
2018	GLAAD Media Award	Davidson/Valentini Award	Himself	Honored	
