= Sequestered (TV series) =

- Genre: Thriller
- Created by: Aaron Tracy
- Starring: Jesse Bradford; Summer Glau; James Maslow; Bruce Davison; Chris Ellis; Ryan McPartlin; Patrick Warburton; Dina Meyer
- Country of origin: United States
- Original language: English
- No. of seasons: 1
- No. of episodes: 12

Production
- Executive producers: Jaime Burke; Amy Kim; Shawn Ku; Vahan Paretchan; Barry Schkolnick; Aaron Tracy
- Cinematography: Timothy A. Burton
- Editors: Gehrig Burnett Jr.; Brian Kim; Joseph McCasland; Tom Wallerstein
- Running time: 22–23 minutes
- Production company: Lifeboat Productions

Original release
- Network: Crackle
- Release: August 5 – October 14, 2014

Sequestered is an American thriller television series created by Aaron Tracy, airing via online streaming video service Crackle. The first six episodes were released online on August 5, 2014, and the second set of six episodes were released on October 14. The show is no longer available on the Crackle service or Netflix but is now available on the 7plus service for free.

== Plot ==
The series follows the trial of Malcolm Miller, a man accused of kidnapping and murdering the governor's young son. A jury is sequestered in a hotel where it has to decide Miller's fate, while his young lawyer Danny Firmin starts to put together what seems to be pieces of a conspiracy. Anna, one of the jurors who believes in Miller's innocence, is soon threatened.

== Cast ==
- Jesse Bradford as Danny Firmin
- James Maslow as Kevin Mohr
- Bruce Davison as Danny Firmin's father
- Chris Ellis as Ron Pritchard
- Patrick Warburton as Mark Bennett
- Dina Meyer as Helen Bennett
- Trevor Torseth as Hugh Cross
- Brooke Wexler as Jenny Brandt

=== Jurors ===
- Summer Glau as Anna Brandt
- Ryan McPartlin as Ryan
- Rhonda Aldrich as Yvonne
- Lindsay Bushman as Kaitlyn
- Heather Dubrow as Marisa
- Chem Ehelepola as Ramesh
- Robert Elzein as Stone
- Christopher Goodman as Charles
- Brian Ibsen as Judd
- Emily Kuroda as Rufang
- Dan Mott as Seth
- Duane Shepard as Vernon

== Episodes ==
No.	Title	Directed by	Written by	Original release date
1	"Twelve Strangers"	Shawn Ku	Aaron Tracy	August 5, 2014
2	"Folding Laundry"	Shawn Ku	Barry Schkolnick	August 5, 2014
3	"Proof of Life"	Shawn Ku	Hernany Perla & Barry Schkolnick	August 5, 2014
4	""1" More"	Shawn Ku	Mark Hosack & Hernany Perla	August 5, 2014
5	"What's in the Box?"	Shawn Ku	Mark Hosack	August 5, 2014
6	"All In"	Shawn Ku	Mark Hosack	August 5, 2014
7	"Grilled Cheese"	Kevin Tancharoen	Barry Schkolnick	October 14, 2014
8	"Stop Crying"	Kevin Tancharoen	Hernany Perla & Mark Hosack	October 14, 2014
9	"Like Sheep"	Kevin Tancharoen	Mark Hosack & Hernany Perla	October 14, 2014
10	"Up On The Roof"	Kevin Tancharoen	Mark Hosack	October 14, 2014
11	"Johannesburg"	Kevin Tancharoen	Hernany Perla & Mark Hosack	October 14, 2014
12	"Ashes To Ashes"	Kevin Tancharoen	Mark Hosack	October 14, 2014

== Awards and nominations ==
Year	Award	Category	Result	Ref.
2015	4th IAWTV Awards	Best Dramatic Series	Nominated	
2015	4th IAWTV Awards	Best Ensemble Performance (Drama)	Nominated	
