= Sean Stone =

American actor and television presenter (born 1984)

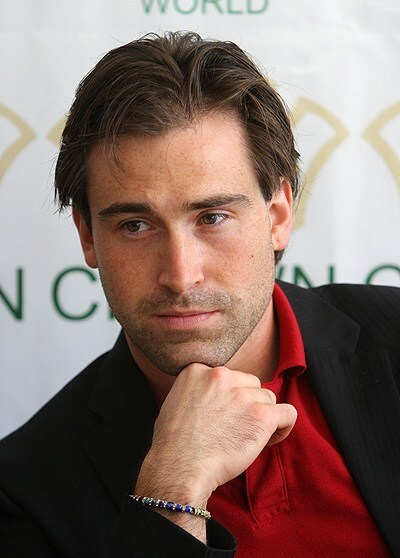
- Stone in 2012
- Born: Sean Christopher Stone; December 29, 1984 (age 41); New York City, New York, U.S.
- Other name: Sean Ali Stone
- Occupations: Actor; filmmaker
- Years active: 1986–present
- Father: Oliver Stone

Sean Christopher Stone (born December 29, 1984) is an American actor, filmmaker, and television host. Stone hosted a show on the Russian state-funded network RT America until the network was shut down in 2022 after Russia's invasion of Ukraine.

== Biography ==
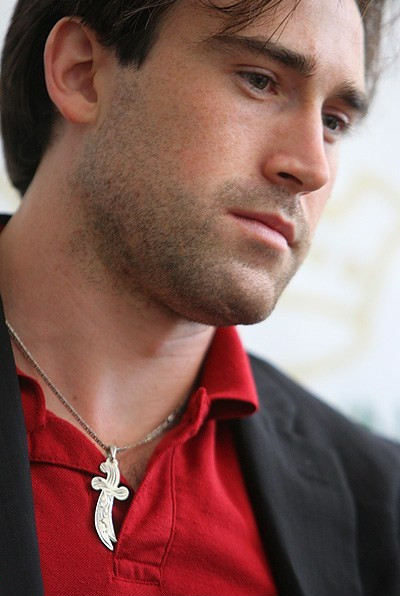
Stone with a necklace with Zulfiqar (the sword of Ali), a symbol of Shia Islam. Stone was a convert to that religion.

Stone was born in New York City. He is the son of Elizabeth Burkit Cox and film director Oliver Stone, and has appeared in several of his father's films. His paternal grandmother was French.

In February 2012, Stone converted to Shia Islam in an official ceremony, and adopted the Islamic first name Ali. In an interview with CNN, Stone said that he accepted Muhammad as the Seal of the Prophets.

== Views ==
=== September 11 attacks ===
Stone has stated in public interviews his belief that the September 11 attacks on the United States in 2001 were an "inside job," explicitly disputing the historical consensus that the attacks were executed by Islamic terrorists under the leadership of Osama bin Laden.

=== Encounters with sorcery and the occult ===
Stone has detailed personal encounters with the occult, claiming that during his 2011 initiation into Freemasonry, he became the target of localized surveillance and threatening, "demonic" phone calls from individuals practicing ritualistic sorcery.

=== Defense of Iranian President Mahmoud Ahmadinejad ===
Speaking to Bill O'Reilly in 2012 following his conversion to Islam in Iran, Stone defended Iranian President Mahmoud Ahmadinejad and claimed that Ahmadinejad's highly controversial rhetoric about the Holocaust and Israel had been "really misunderstood."

=== Conspiracy regarding US national security ===
In 2016, Stone published a book alleging a historical conspiracy to covertly subsume the US national security establishment into a broader British imperial architecture.

=== Work in media for the Russian government ===
Stone worked as executive producer of “Zelenskyy Unmasked” (2024), a video series by Ben Swann, a promoter of conspiracy theories, and a fellow employee of RT America, part of the RT network, a global multilingual television news network based in Moscow and funded by the Russian government. The series heavily attacked the character of Ukrainian President Volodymyr Zelenskyy, and was launched to coincide with Congressional debates regarding increased United States military assistance to Ukraine. In his last episode on RT America, Stone criticized celebrities for speaking out against Russia's invasion of Ukraine, and claimed that Oprah Winfrey had banned Tolstoy's War and Peace from her book club, and said it was wrong to characterize Russian leader Vladimir Putin as "some kind of dictator".

=== US government concealing free energy and extraterrestrial phenomena ===
Stone publicly claimed in 2026 that the United States government actively conceals advanced anti-gravity propulsion technologies. He asserts that this purported "truth embargo" regarding extraterrestrial phenomena and suppressed mechanics is sustained to prevent the economic collapse of the traditional oil and gas industries.

== Filmography ==
=== Actor ===
- Salvador (1986) as Boyle's Baby, directed by Oliver Stone
- Wall Street (1987) as Rudy Gekko, directed by Oliver Stone
- Born on the Fourth of July (1989) as Young Jimmy Kovic, directed by Oliver Stone
- JFK (1991) as Jasper Garrison, directed by Oliver Stone
- The Doors (1991) as Young Jim Morrison, directed by Oliver Stone
- Heaven & Earth (1993) as Young Boy with Jesuit Missionaries, directed by Oliver Stone
- Natural Born Killers (1994) as Kevin, directed by Oliver Stone
- Nixon (1995) as Donald Nixon, directed by Oliver Stone
- U Turn (1997) as Boy in Grocery Store, directed by Oliver Stone
- Any Given Sunday (1999) as Fan, directed by Oliver Stone
- Fighting Against Time: Oliver Stone's Alexander (2005) himself as narrator
- Resurrecting Alexander (2005) himself as narrator
- Perfect Is the Enemy of Good (2005) as narrator
- W. (2008) as Fraternity Pledge #1, directed by Oliver Stone
- Wall Street: Money Never Sleeps (2010) as Rumor Hedge Fund Trader #1, directed by Oliver Stone
- Nevo (2011) as Stephan
- Greystone Park (2011) as Sean
- American Road (2011) as Jack Kerouac
- Don't Pass Me By (2012) as Josh Malek
- Awakened (2013) as Man with the Fedora Hat
- Night Walk (2019) as Frank

=== Director, producer, cinematographer, or screenwriter ===
- Fighting Against Time: Oliver Stone's Alexander (2005) (as writer, producer, director, cinematographer)
- The Death of Alexander (2005) (as producer, director, cinematographer)
- Resurrecting Alexander (2005) (as producer, director, cinematographer)
- Perfect Is the Enemy of Good (2005) (as producer, director, cinematographer)
- Nuremberg: A Vision Restored (2007) (as producer, director, cinematographer)
- Singularity (2008) (as writer, producer, director)
- Greystone Park (2011) (as writer, director)
- A Child's Night Dream (upcoming) (as writer, producer, director)
- A Thousand Pieces (2020) (as narrator), Documentary about CIA and FBI corruption.
- Zelenskyy Unmasked (2024) (as executive director)
- All The President's Men (2024) (docuseries directed by Sean Stone and produced by Igor Lopatonok and Simona Papadopoulos)
- RFK: Legacy (2025) (as director)
