= Celebrity Big Brother 2 (American season) =

Coordinates: 34°8′40.12″N 118°23′20.71″W

- Season 2
- Promotional image for the season
- Hosted by: Julie Chen Moonves
- No. of days: 29
- No. of houseguests: 12
- Winner: Tamar Braxton
- Runner-up: Ricky Williams
- America's Favorite HouseGuest: Tom Green
- Companion show: Celebrity Big Brother: After Dark
- No. of episodes: 13

Release
- Original network: CBS
- Original release: January 21 – February 13, 2019

Additional information
- Filming dates: January 16 – February 13, 2019

Season chronology
- ← Previous; Season 1 Next → Season 3

Celebrity Big Brother 2 (Note: While the opening credits and the logo simply identify this season as Celebrity Big Brother the legal terms and conditions during a public vote named the show Celebrity Big Brother 2.) is the second season of the American reality television series Celebrity Big Brother, also known as Big Brother: Celebrity Edition. It premiered on CBS on January 21, 2019, and concluded on February 13, 2019. It consisted of thirteen episodes, each approximately 60–120 minutes long, with Allison Grodner and Rich Meehan as executive producers for Fly on the Wall Entertainment, in association with Endemol Shine North America. CBS ordered the season on May 12, 2018, and confirmed it for a mid-season return when the network revealed its 2018–19 fall schedule on May 16, 2018. The network confirmed on November 27, 2018, that Julie Chen Moonves would continue her role as host despite media speculation that she may not return after her husband Les Moonves' departure from CBS Corporation due to sexual misconduct allegations against him.

The season followed a group of celebrities, known as HouseGuests, who lived in the Big Brother House under constant surveillance with no contact from the outside world. Periodically the HouseGuests faced eviction while trying to be the last HouseGuest standing and win the grand prize. Tamar Braxton beat Ricky Williams by a unanimous jury vote during the live final. Braxton is the first African-American winner of the United States version of Big Brother, and she and Williams made up the first final two who were both African-American. Tom Green was later named America's Favorite HouseGuest.

== HouseGuests ==
The cast of Celebrity Big Brother 2 L–R: Tom Green, Tamar Braxton, Ryan Lochte, Dina Lohan, Kandi Burruss, Anthony Scaramucci, Joey Lawrence, Lolo Jones, Ricky Williams, Natalie Eva Marie, Jonathan Bennett and Kato Kaelin

The twelve HouseGuests were announced on January 13, 2019, during a commercial break of CBS' NFL football coverage. Tom Green became the first Canadian to enter the US Big Brother house.

Name	Age on entry	Notability	Residence	Result
Tamar Braxton	41	Singer and TV personality	Los Angeles, California	Winner; Day 29
Ricky Williams	41	Former NFL running back	Venice Beach, California	Runner-up; Day 29
Lolo Jones	36	Olympic track and bobsled athlete	Baton Rouge, Louisiana	Evicted; Day 29
Dina Lohan	56	Momager	Long Island, New York	Evicted; Day 29
Kandi Burruss	42	Singer and TV personality	Atlanta, Georgia	Evicted; Day 29
Tom Green	47	Comedian	Los Angeles, California	Evicted; Day 24
Natalie Eva Marie	34	Former WWE wrestler and actress	North Tustin, California	Evicted; Day 24
Kato Kaelin	59	Actor and host	Los Angeles, California	Evicted; Day 20
Joey Lawrence	42	Actor and producer	Los Angeles, California	Evicted; Day 18
Ryan Lochte	34	Competitive swimmer and 12-time Olympic medalist	Gainesville, Florida	Evicted; Day 13
Jonathan Bennett	37	Actor and host	Newport Beach, California	Evicted; Day 10

=== Fake HouseGuest ===
Name	Age on entry	Notability	Residence
Anthony Scaramucci	55	Former White House Communications Director and financier	Manhasset, New York

=== Future appearances ===
Tamar Braxton appeared in an episode of The Bold and the Beautiful on March 29, 2019. Lolo Jones competed on the thirty-sixth season of The Challenge. Tom Green returned in the seventh episode of the twenty-third season of the civilian edition to host a Head of Household Competition. In 2023, Ryan Lochte competed on the first season of The Traitors.

== Episodes ==
No. overall	No. in season	Title	Day(s)	Original release date	US viewers (millions)	Rating/share (18–49)
Week 1
14	1	"Episode 1"	Day 1	January 21, 2019	5.36	1.4/6
On Day 1 twelve new celebrities entered the recently re-designed Big Brother House. After exploring the house and picking their beds the HouseGuests introduced themselves over wine. Julie then informed the HouseGuests that two of them would become the first "celebrity power pair" in the house. She also told them that in the first Head of Household competition that they would be competing in pairs and that one member of the winning pair would become the first HoH of the season. Only five pairs competed in the competition, meaning that two competitors did not compete. The HouseGuests participated in a selection process beginning with Ryan – as selected by random draw. Natalie and Kato were not selected and were awarded immunity from the first eviction.: Head of Household Part 1: ("Drinks On Us") When the competition began, one member of a pair must swing back and forth and collect champagne from a giant bottle in a glass. Once they reach the other member, they must transfer the champagne to the other member's glass, who then swings forward to dump it into a giant glass full of bubbles. The first pair to get a bubble out of their giant glass won the competition. Jonathan and Ryan were the winning pair. Julie then announced that the power pair would compete against each other. The winning member would become the first HoH of the season while the losing member would become the first nominee holding the threat of being the first evicted.
15	2	"Episode 2"	Days 1–3	January 22, 2019	4.88	1.3/6
The HouseGuests began strategizing about the first eviction. Meanwhile, the backyard opened up to the HouseGuests for the first time.: Head of Household Part 2: ("Blockbuster") In this competition the two competitors, Jonathan and Ryan, must zip down a zipline to billboards promoting the competitors for a fictional movie called "The Nominee". Once they reach the billboard they must knock down the two that feature them. The first competitor to knock down their billboard pieces won the competition. Ryan was first to knock down both of his billboards and became the first HoH of the season.; Next, Julie told the HouseGuests that Jonathan would be the first of three nominees and that Ryan would have to nominate two others to be on the block. In addition, Ryan nominated Anthony and Tom for eviction.
16	3	"Episode 3"	Days 3–5	January 23, 2019	4.42	1.1/5
Tensions begin to rise as the majority alliance of Ryan, Jonathan, Lolo, Natalie, Kandi, and Tamar begin to distrust each other. The alliance agreed to nominate Anthony and Dina, but Jonathan convinced Ryan to nominate Tom instead of Dina to protect an old friend. This upset the girls in the alliance and they grew wary of Jonathan's control. Meanwhile, Kandi and Tamar had an argument, further destroying the alliance.: Power of Veto: ("Giddy Up") HouseGuests must ride back and forth on a mechanical horse. After doing this 60 times they get 30 seconds to build their golden bars onto their horseshoe. Once they run out of time they must go back to their horse and ride again. The first HouseGuest to have all their golden bars stacked will win the Power of Veto. Ricky had all of his bars stacked first and won the Power of Veto.; At the Veto meeting, Ricky decided to not use the Power of Veto.
17	4	"Episode 4"	Days 5–10	January 25, 2019	4.54	1.0/5
Following the nomination ceremony tensions began to rise throughout the house. In a fake Entertainment Tonight broadcast the HouseGuests found out that one of the fellow competitors was not a real HouseGuest. Anthony Scaramucci then revealed that he was the fake HouseGuest. He also announced that because he was now out of the house Ryan would have to nominate a new person. As Ricky won the previous veto he was immune from being nominated for the remainder of the round. Kato and Natalie also remained safe as part of the HoH competition. Ryan subsequently nominated Kandi to take his place. As the third part to this twist, Anthony announced that there would be a second veto played for this round of nominations allowing everyone on the block a second chance to be safe for the week.: Power of Veto ("Mooch's Veto") In this competition news headlines, related to Scarmucci or "The Mooch", are placed all over the walls and floors of a room. The competitors must decide which headlines are real and which headlines are fake. The HouseGuest that guesses closest to the number of correct headlines would win the competition. Kato won the veto with eight real headlines.; At the veto meeting Kato removed Tom from the block, Ryan nominated Joey in his place. The HouseGuests then participated in the live vote and eviction. Each HouseGuest, except for the three nominees and the HoH, voted on who they wished to evict from the house. On Day 10, by a vote of 6–1–0, with Dina voting to evict Kandi, Jonathan was the first to be evicted from the Celebrity Big Brother house, he also became the first juror.
Week 2
18	5	"Episode 5"	Days 10–11	January 27, 2019	4.71	1.0/4
19	6	"Episode 6"	Days 11–13	January 28, 2019	4.61	1.1/5
Kato begins thinking about who he wants to nominate for eviction. The HouseGuests then participated in a live veto competition and ceremony followed by the live vote and eviction.: Power of Veto ("Worldwide Rollout") By random draw Dina, Joey, Kato, Natalie, Tamar, and Tom were chosen to compete. When the competition begins each competing HouseGuest must roll their ball across the world. As the ball rolls down it will fall into a numbered slot. The HouseGuest whose ball falls into the highest numbered slot won the competition. Tamar and Tom tied with the highest score and each took another turn against each other. Tom had the highest score and won the PoV.; At the Veto ceremony Tom chose to use the PoV on Dina. Kato then nominated Ryan as the replacement nominee. On Day 13, by a vote of 6–1, with Joey voting Tamar, Ryan was the second to be evicted from the Celebrity Big Brother house. He subsequently became the second juror.
20	7	"Episode 7"	Days 13–15	January 30, 2019	4.82	1.2/5
21	8	"Episode 8"	Days 15–18	February 2, 2019	3.28	0.7/3
Following the nomination ceremony the HouseGuests begin strategizing on whom to evict.: Power of Veto: ("Kick the Competition") This football-themed competition was played by Joey, Kandi, and Tom along with Dina, Lolo, and Natalie chosen by random draw. When the competition begins, the two competing HouseGuests must spin in a circle seventeen times to lower the goal blocker. After the goal blocker is lowered they must run and kick a field goal before the goal blocker rises again seven seconds later. One HouseGuest must successfully kick three goals to win. In the first round, Lolo chose to compete against Dina and beat her with a score of 3 to 0. In the second round, Tom chose to compete against Joey and beat him 3 to 2. In the third round, Kandi chose to compete against Tom and Tom beat Kandi 3 to 0. In the fourth round, Natalie chose to play against Tom and beat him with a score of 3 to 2. In the final round, played between Natalie and Lolo, Natalie beat Lolo with a score of 3 to 2 and received the Power of Veto.; At the veto ceremony, Natalie chose not to use the PoV, leaving nominations the same. The HouseGuests then participated in the live vote and eviction by voting on who they wished to evict from the house. On Day 18, by a unanimous vote of 6–0, Joey was the third to be evicted from the Celebrity Big Brother house, also becoming the third juror.
Week 3
22	9	"Episode 9"	Days 18–20	February 4, 2019	4.13	1.1/5
Following Joey's eviction tensions begin to rise in the house.: Head of Household: ("Picture Imperfect") Two by two, the HouseGuests face off against each other to compare three magazine covers featuring the HouseGuests. One magazine cover has an error. Once a HouseGuest detects the error they must buzz in using a button corresponding to that cover. If the HouseGuest is correct, their opponent is eliminated while they advance and choose the next two to compete. If a HouseGuest answers first but is incorrect, they are eliminated. The final round came down to Kato and Tamar. Tamar was the winner and became the next HoH.; On Day 19, Tamar nominated Kato and Tom for eviction. Then on Day 20, the HouseGuests participated in the live Power of Veto competition, followed by the veto ceremony, and finally the live vote and eviction.: Power of Veto: ("Smashing Success") Tamar, Kato, and Tom competed in the competition along with Lolo, Kandi, and Dina chosen by random draw. Before the competition began the HouseGuests watched a performance by Gallagher. Julie then asked the HouseGuests a series of questions about the performance to which the answer was either true or false. For each correct answer the HouseGuests gain a point. The HouseGuest with the most points at the end was the winner. If multiple HouseGuests had the same score there would be a tiebreaker round. Lolo was the winner with seven points.; At the veto ceremony Lolo decided not to use the PoV. The two nominees then had a chance to give a final speech. The other HouseGuests with the exception of Tamar voted for who they wished to evict from the house. On Day 20, by a unanimous vote of 5–0, Kato was the fourth to be evicted from the Celebrity Big Brother house, he became the fourth juror.
23	10	"Episode 10"	Days 20–21	February 7, 2019	4.74	1.1/5
Following Kato's eviction the HouseGuests begin planning who they want to evict next.: Head of Household: ("Celebrity Tumbling Dice") This competition was hosted by former Celebrity Big Brother HouseGuest Omarosa. When the competition begins Omarosa spins a giant wheel which lands on a random number. The competing HouseGuests must then climb inside of a giant die. Once in they must roll the die and return to their starting position with the random number on top. The final round came down to Tom and Natalie. Tom was the winner and became the next HoH.; Following his HoH win Tom has a one-on-one meeting with each of the remaining HouseGuests as he begins deciding who he wants to nominate. On Day 21 Tom nominated Natalie and Ricky for eviction.
24	11	"Episode 11"	Days 21–24	February 8, 2019	4.38	1.0/5
Following the nomination ceremony the HouseGuests prepare for the Power of Veto competition. The Power of Veto competition was played by Tom, Ricky, and Natalie; along with Tamar, Kandi, and Dina chosen by random draw. Julie then informed the HouseGuests of the double eviction.: Power of Veto: ("Color Blast!") In this competition the HouseGuests view a random sequence of colors. They are then instructed to remember a certain number from the sequence and push the button corresponding color. If a HouseGuest chooses incorrectly they are blasted with color and eliminated from the competition. The last HouseGuest remaining won the PoV. Tom was the last contestant standing and received the PoV.; At the veto ceremony Tom chose to use the Power of Veto on Ricky and then named Lolo as the replacement nominee. The HouseGuests then participated in the first live vote and eviction of the night by voting on who they wished to evict from the house. On Day 24, by a unanimous vote of 4–0, Natalie Eva Marie was first to be evicted for the time, the fifth to be evicted from the Celebrity Big Brother house, and became the fifth juror. The HouseGuests were then informed of the final "Breaking Celebrity News" twist. This time being a safety competition; one HouseGuest would have the chance to be safe for the night, being immune from the second eviction, but not have the opportunity to win Head of Household for the round.: Safety Competition: ("Living Art") When the competition begins the HouseGuests have ninety seconds and must run through the house and search for all the "Living Art" scattered without. At the end they must return to their podium, write down the number of people they found, and lock in their final answer. The HouseGuest who guesses correctly won immunity for the round, if no one was correct the HouseGuest who came closest without going over became immune. Julie informed the competitors that there were twenty-two people inside the house, Tamar became the winner with an answer of nineteen.; Head of Household: ("Living Art") When the competition begins the competing HouseGuests once again have ninety seconds and must run through the house and search for all the "Living Art" that disappeared from the safety competition. At the end they must return to their podium, write down the number of people who disappeared, and lock in their final answer. The HouseGuest who guesses correctly won the competition, if no one was correct the HouseGuest who came closest without going over won. This time Julie informed them that the correct answer was seven, Lolo, who answered correctly, became the next HoH.; On Day 24 Lolo nominated Tom and Kandi for eviction.: Power of Veto: ("Cousins") The HouseGuests watched an episode of the fictional sitcom, "Cousins" starring former Celebrity Big Brother HouseGuests Metta World Peace and Ross Mathews. Julie then asked the competing HouseGuests a series of questions about the video. If they answer correctly they gain a point, the HouseGuest with the most points at the end of the game received the PoV. At the end of six rounds Ricky and Tamar tied with six points each. The game then entered a tiebreaker, Julie asked Ricky and Tamar a question to which the answer was a number. The HouseGuest who guessed closest to the correct number without going over would win, if both went over the HouseGuest who guessed closest to the correct answer would win. Tamar guessed closest without going over and won the PoV.; At the veto ceremony Tamar decided not to use the Power of Veto leaving nominations the same. The HouseGuests then participated in the second vote and eviction for the evening. Also on Day 24, by a unanimous vote of 3–0, Tom was second to be evicted for the time, the sixth to be evicted from the Celebrity Big Brother house, and subsequently became the sixth juror. Julie then informed the HouseGuests that all five remaining HouseGuests would make it to finale night.
Week 4
25	12	"Episode 12"	Days 24–25; Various (Note: The HouseGuests looked back over their time in the game on Day 24. Flashbacks were shown that featured content from the previous twenty-three days.)	February 11, 2019	3.40	0.8/4
Following Tom's eviction the remaining HouseGuests celebrate making it to finale night. Former Celebrity Big Brother HouseGuest Mark McGrath joined the final five as they looked back over their time in the house.: Head of Household: ("Bats the Musical") (Note: This Head of Household competition began in episode 12 on Day 24. However, completion was not broadcast on television until episode 13.) This competition was hosted by first season winner Marissa Jaret Winokur. When the competition begins the HouseGuests must hit their buzzer to magnetize their puzzle board for twenty seconds. Once magnetized they must "fly" across and begin putting a puzzle together for the fictional "Bats the Musical". Before the twenty seconds is up they must hit their buzzer again to reset the twenty seconds; if they do not hit the buzzer again in time their board will demagnetize, the puzzle will fall apart, and they must start again.
26	13	"Episode 13"	Days 24–29	February 13, 2019	3.87	0.9/5
Head of Household: ("Bats the Musical") Dina was eliminated from the competition first after having an elapsed time without hitting her buzzer again. Ricky became the winner after he was the first to successfully to complete his buzzer.; At the nomination ceremony Ricky nominated Dina and Kandi.: Power of Veto ("Veto Heist") This competition was played individually by all remaining HouseGuests. When the competition begins the competing HouseGuest is instructed to "steal" and item from the Big Brother Power of Veto memorabilia museum, in doing so they must avoid all the lasers in the hall between them and the museum. If they trigger a laser an alarm sounds and they must get to the security desk, reset the alarm, and begin again. Once they have retrieved an item they must travel back through the lasers with the item and place it in their box. If it is the correct item they are instructed on the next item, otherwise they must try again. The first HouseGuest to collect four correct items in the shortest amount of time won the PoV. Lolo finished with the fastest time of five minutes and eight seconds and received the final Power of Veto of the season.; During the veto ceremony Lolo chose not to use the Power of Veto keeping nominations the same. Julie then interviewed fake HouseGuest, and main twist of the season, Anthony Scaramucci. The HouseGuests then participated in the first live vote and eviction of the evening by voting to evict who they wished to leave the house. On Day 29, with a tie vote of 1–1, Ricky was forced to break the tie; Ricky cast the sole vote to evict Kandi. Kandi was the seventh to be evicted from the Celebrity Big Brother house and became the seventh juror.: Head of Household ("Celebrity Lookalike Junior") In this competition the HouseGuests view videos featuring "Celebrity Lookalike Juniors" who speak three lines each. Julie then asks the HouseGuests to identify which of the three statements were false. If a HouseGUest answers correctly they gain a point. The HouseGuest who has the most points at the end of the competition won the HoH. Ricky and Tamar tied at the end of seven rounds with six points each. The game then entered a tiebreaker, Julie asked Ricky and Tamar a question to which the answer was a number. The HouseGuest who answers closest without going over would win the HoH. If both went over the HouseGuest who guessed closest would win. Ricky answered closest without going over and became final and most powerful Head of Household of the season.; With Dina, Tamar, and Lolo all nominated by default; Ricky participated in the second live vote and eviction of the evening by casting the sole vote to evict two of the three effectively choosing who he wishes to take with him to the final two. Also on Day 29 Ricky chose to evict Dina and Lolo. Dina and Lolo became the eighth and ninth to be evicted as well as the eighth and ninth jurors respectively. The jury then had a chance to ask the final two questions prior to placing their votes. Ricky and Tamar also had the chance to give a final speech in an attempt to persuade the jury to vote for them. The jury then voted on who they think should win the game. For the second time in Big Brother US history and the first time since the tenth season in 2008 the jury vote was unanimous. Tamar became the second winner of Celebrity Big Brother receiving $250,000 making Ricky the runner-up who received $50,000. Tom was later named America's Favorite HouseGuest and also received $25,000.

== Voting history ==
Color key:

Winner
Runner-up
Head of Household
Nominated for eviction
Immune from eviction
Evicted
Left

	Week 1		Week 2		Week 3			Week 4		
	Day 1	Day 6	Day 10	Day 14	Day 19	Day 21	Day 24 (Note: There was a double eviction on Day 24. Following the first eviction, the remaining HouseGuests played a round worth of games — including HoH and Veto competitions and Nomination, Veto and Eviction ceremonies—during the remainder of the live show, culminating in a second eviction for the night.)	Day 25	Day 29	Finale
Head of Household	Ryan (Note: As the winning pair of the first HoH competition, Ryan & Jonathan participated in a second competition. Ryan was the winner making him the first Head of Household, while Jonathan became the first nominee.)		Kato	Tom	Tamar	Tom	Lolo	Ricky	Ricky (Note: Following the last Head of Household competition, all remaining HouseGuests with the exception of the HoH will become immediately nominated. The final Head of Household will then choose two of the three nominated HouseGuests and immediately cast the sole vote to evict.)	(None)
Nominations (initial)	Anthony; Jonathan; Tom	Jonathan; Kandi; Tom	Dina; Tamar	Joey; Kandi	Kato; Tom	Natalie; Ricky	Kandi; Tom	Dina; Kandi	(None)	(None)
Veto winner	Ricky	Kato	Tom	Natalie	Lolo	Tom	Tamar	Lolo	(None)	(None)
Nominations (final)	Anthony; Jonathan; Tom	Joey; Jonathan; Kandi	Ryan; Tamar	Joey; Kandi	Kato; Tom	Lolo; Natalie	Kandi; Tom	Dina; Kandi	Dina; Lolo; Tamar	(None)
Tamar	No voting	Jonathan	Nominated	Joey	Head of Household	Natalie	Tom	Dina	Nominated	Winner
Ricky	No voting	Jonathan (Note: Because Ricky won the first veto competition of the week, he was immune from being nominated as a replacement for Anthony and later at the second veto meeting.)	Ryan	Joey	Kato	Natalie	Tom	Kandi (Note: As the vote was tied, the Head of Household cast the tie-breaking vote.)	Dina; Lolo	Runner-up
Lolo	No voting	Jonathan	Ryan	Joey	Kato	Nominated	Head of Household	Kandi	Evicted (Day 29)	Tamar
Dina	No voting	Kandi	Ryan	Joey	Kato	Natalie	Tom	Nominated	Evicted (Day 29)	Tamar
Kandi	No voting	Nominated	Ryan	Nominated	Kato	Natalie	Nominated	Nominated	Evicted (Day 29)	Tamar
Tom	Nominated	Jonathan	Ryan	Head of Household	Nominated	Head of Household	Nominated	Evicted (Day 24)		Tamar
Natalie	No voting (Note: Before the beginning of the first Head of Household competition, HouseGuests were instructed to choose a partner to compete with. Natalie and Kato were not chosen and were immune from nominations for the week.)	Jonathan	Ryan	Joey	Kato	Nominated	Evicted (Day 24)			Tamar
Kato	No voting	Jonathan	Head of Household	Joey	Nominated	Evicted (Day 20)				Tamar
Joey	No voting	Nominated	Tamar	Nominated	Evicted (Day 18)					Tamar
Ryan	Head of Household		Nominated	Evicted (Day 13)						Tamar
Jonathan	Nominated		Evicted (Day 10)							Tamar
Fake HouseGuest
Anthony	Nominated	Left (Day 6)								
Evicted	Anthony; Fake; HouseGuest	Jonathan; 6 of 7 votes to evict	Ryan; 6 of 7 votes to evict	Joey; 6 of 6 votes to evict	Kato; 5 of 5 votes to evict	Natalie; 4 of 4 votes to evict	Tom; 3 of 3 votes to evict	Kandi; 2 of 3 votes to evict	Dina; Ricky's choice to evict	Tamar; 9 votes to win
Evicted	Anthony; Fake; HouseGuest	Jonathan; 6 of 7 votes to evict	Ryan; 6 of 7 votes to evict	Joey; 6 of 6 votes to evict	Kato; 5 of 5 votes to evict	Natalie; 4 of 4 votes to evict	Tom; 3 of 3 votes to evict	Kandi; 2 of 3 votes to evict	Lolo; Ricky's choice to evict	Ricky; 0 votes to win

== Production ==
An American version of Celebrity Big Brother had been speculated by the media since 2002 while American celebrities began appearing as Housemates on the British adaptation since its third season in 2005. The first season of the American adaptation of Celebrity Big Brother was announced on September 7, 2017, during a live double eviction episode of Big Brother 19. The first season premiered on February 7, 2018; it was scheduled as counterprogramming against the 2018 Winter Olympics airing on NBC. The series premiere was the number one program for CBS attracting 7.27 million viewers with a 1.8/7 rating in the 18–49 demographic and the highest rated season premiere since Big Brother 13. The season finale pulled in 5.21 million viewers and a 1.4/5 rating in the 18–49 demographic. CBS ordered a second season of Celebrity Big Brother on May 12, 2018, then confirmed it would return for a mid-season run four days later when the network revealed its 2018–19 fall prime-time schedule.

=== Crew ===
Allison Grodner and Rich Meehan serve as executive producers for the second season. Their production company Fly on the Wall Entertainment will produce the season for CBS in association with Endemol Shine North America. The media speculated that Julie Chen Moonves might not continue hosting Big Brother after her husband Les Moonves' departure from CBS Corporation on September 9, 2018, because of multiple sexual misconduct allegations. Chen Moonves has been the host of the American adaption of the format since the first season of Big Brother. She subsequently stepped down as a co-host of The Talk on September 18, 2018, while continuing to host Big Brother 20. CBS confirmed on November 27, 2018, that Chen Moonves would host the second season of Celebrity Big Brother.

=== House ===
The New York City theme for the house includes a kitchen and dining room based on New York restaurants. The spiral staircase and sliding glass doors can be seen in the background.

As with each season since Big Brother 6, the program is filmed at CBS Studios, soundstage 18 in Studio City, California in a custom-built two story house. Soundstage 18 was previously used to film the sitcom Yes, Dear. The House was equipped with over 80 high-definition cameras and over 100 microphones in order to monitor and record the HouseGuests. The living room, three bedrooms, kitchen, bathroom, and lounge room are located on the first floor. The Head of Household bedroom, gym area, and an additional lounge area are located on the second floor. The second floor is accessible by a spiral staircase located in the kitchen next to the sliding glass doors that lead to the backyard. CBS released pictures and video of the redesigned House on January 16, 2019, through several media outlets like Entertainment Weekly, The Hollywood Reporter, Entertainment Tonight and ET Canada.

The interior of the Celebrity Big Brother house has a New York City theme from around the 1940s. Each of the bedrooms on the first floor were given their own individual names reflecting their design. The first bedroom has a "5th Avenue" theme inspired by window shopping highlighting "the highest fashion of the '40s" while the second bedroom has a luxury "Hotel" theme. The third bedroom, known as the "Celebrity Building" Bedroom, that was inspired by a famous art deco building named after a car company. The kitchen was inspired by some of the finest restaurants in New York City with a "faux French" oven island and a square dining room table. Behind the dining room table cartoon-style pictures of the season one HouseGuests hanging on the wall. The bathroom and downstairs lounge area were inspired by the 20th Century Limited passenger train. The Head of Household bedroom resembles the backstage of a Broadway show with the head board made from a real theater marquee. The upstairs lounge was designed after the Brooklyn Bridge, while the gym area was inspired by the 42nd Street library in Manhattan.

=== Broadcasts ===
The main television coverage of the second season was screened on CBS during the winter of the 2018–19 network television season. The season premiere was on January 21, 2019, with the season finale airing on February 13, 2019. Alongside the weekly shows on CBS, the companion series Celebrity Big Brother: After Dark returned on Pop and to provide live coverage nightly from inside the House.

=== Format ===
The format remains largely unchanged from the previous season. HouseGuests are incarcerated in the Big Brother House with no contact to and from the outside world. Periodically, the HouseGuests take part in several compulsory challenges that determine who would win safety and power in the House. The winner of the Head of Household (HoH) competition is immune from nominations and is instructed to nominate two fellow HouseGuests for eviction. After a HouseGuest became Head of Household, he or she was ineligible to take part in the next Head of Household competition. The winner of the Power of Veto competition wins the right to save one of the nominated HouseGuests from eviction. If the Veto winner exercised the power, the Head of Household then had to nominate another HouseGuest for eviction.

On eviction night, all HouseGuests except for the Head of Household and the nominees voted to evict one of the nominees. Before the voting began, the nominees had the chance to say a final message to their fellow HouseGuests. This compulsory vote is conducted in the privacy of the Diary Room by the host Julie Chen Moonves. In the event of a tie, the Head of Household would break the tie and reveal their vote in front of the other HouseGuests. Unlike other versions of Big Brother, the HouseGuests can discuss the nomination and eviction process open and freely. The nominee with the most votes from the other HouseGuests is evicted from the House on eviction night and interviewed by the host. HouseGuests can voluntarily leave the House at any time (referred to as "walking") and those who break the rules are expelled by Big Brother. The evictees of the season form the Jury that vote for the winner on the season finale; they are known as the jury members. Unlike the jury members of Big Brother, the celebrity jury members are not sequestered after their eviction and are able to watch the show after their eviction. The winner of Celebrity Big Brother receives the grand prize of $250,000.

Temporary changes to the regular format are known as twists. After the HouseGuests moved into the House, they were introduced to three twists on their first day. The HouseGuests had to compete in teams of two for the first Head of Household competition. However, only five teams would compete. After Kato and Natalie were not selected to compete in the Head of Household competition, the second twist was revealed when they were given immunity from the first eviction, meaning that they could not be nominated by the Head of Household for eviction. The third twist impacted the winning pair, Ryan and Jonathan, where they had to compete against each other to become the first Head of Household. Jonathan lost this part of the competition and was automatically nominated as a third nominee for eviction as a result.

=== Twists ===
==== "Breaking Celebrity News" twists ====
Julie announced during episode four that the HouseGuests will be receiving twists with the theme of "breaking celebrity news." When a twist was revealed to the HouseGuests, they would see a fake Entertainment Tonight broadcast on the television screen informing them of the twist.

===== Fake HouseGuest =====
The 24/7 internet live feeds officially opened permanently to CBS All Access subscribers in the early morning hours of January 22, 2019. Shortly after, viewers began to notice that Anthony Scaramucci was missing from the house. Some initial speculation stated that he only left temporarily due to his face on the memory wall, which is normally grayed out when a HouseGuest leaves, still being in color. These claims were later disproved when a HouseGuest questioned why his face hadn't turned black and white and another stated "I miss Anthony Scaramucci". It was assumed by many news sites that Scaramucci had walked from the game on January 21, 2019. Official reasons for his departure were left unknown at the time however one fellow HouseGuest stated that "they found out Anthony was a mole" and "not a real player" while other sources simply stated that he quit. Days later on January 23, 2019, Scaramucci appeared at a SkyBridge Capital conference in Zurich, Switzerland. In a video acquired by TMZ when Scaramucci was asked about his departure he stated that he "unfortunately signed a confidentiality agreement" and that "there’s a little bit of a cliffhanger". It was announced that more information about Scaramucci's exit would air ahead of the live eviction in the fourth episode of the season on January 25, 2019.

In the episode it was revealed that Scaramucci was a fake HouseGuest who entered the house as part of a twist. In addition, a second veto competition was played that week with the first veto winner becoming safe from eviction. In a post-departure interview with Entertainment Tonight when asked about the twist he stated that although he knew his departure date and that he was part of twist he did not know the full details until fifteen minutes before leaving. In a second interview with Entertainment Weekly Scaramucci was asked whether the twist had been planned or if it was a cover-up, he responded "I absolutely did not quit the game. The producers from day one pitched me the idea of becoming a twist in the show."

===== Power of the Publicist =====
The Power of the Publicist was a power awarded to the HouseGuest who received the most votes. This power granted one HouseGuest the ability to remove themselves off the block at one of the next two nomination or veto ceremonies. It automatically expired after the veto meeting on Day 20. In order to vote, the viewers needed to post a tweet that included a specific hashtag created by CBS that corresponded with the HouseGuest's name.

Immediately as the show went off the air, tweets started pouring in with hashtags for the show. Specifically, two hashtags started trending the most on Twitter: Joey and Tamar. #CBBTamar trended in the United States for nine hours and peaked at #2 on the trending list. #CBBJoey trended for eight hours in the United States and peaked at #5 on the trending list. Joey started trending because people were still shocked from the Ryan blindside, so they wanted to give Joey, Ryan's closest ally and the underdog, some safety. Tamar started trending because the viewers wanted the drama and entertainment to stay in the house for a few more weeks. In the end, Tamar edged out over Joey and won the Power of the Publicist.

The Power of the Publicist was never used since Tamar wasn't nominated from Day 14 to Day 18, then became ineligible to use it during her Head of Household reign from Day 19 to Day 20.

===== Double Eviction Safety Competition =====
The final twist was revealed on Day 24 during the double eviction episode. The winner of the special safety competition, Tamar, won immunity during the double eviction, but became ineligible to become Head of Household as she could not compete.

== Viewing figures ==
=== United States ===
No.	Air date	Time slot (ET)	Rank (timeslot)	Rank (night)	Rating/share (18–49)	Viewers (millions)	DVR (18–49)	DVR viewers (millions)	Total (18–49)	Total viewers (millions)	Refs
1	Monday, January 21, 2019	8:00 p.m.	3	2	1.5/6	5.36	0.6	1.62	2.1	6.98	
2	Tuesday, January 22, 2019	8:00 p.m.	3	3	1.3/6	4.88	0.6	1.36	1.9	6.24	
3	Wednesday, January 23, 2019	8:00 p.m.	3	2	1.1/5	4.42	0.8	1.65	1.9	6.07	
4	Friday, January 25, 2019	8:00 p.m.	1	3	1.0/5	4.54	0.7	1.55	1.7	6.09	
5	Sunday, January 27, 2019	8:00 p.m.	2	4	1.0/4	4.71	0.6	1.26	1.6	5.97	
6	Monday, January 28, 2019	8:00 p.m.	3	3	1.1/5	4.61	0.5	1.25	1.6	5.86	
7	Wednesday, January 30, 2019	8:00 p.m.	2	3	1.2/5	4.82	0.5	1.24	1.7	6.06	
8	Saturday, February 2, 2019	8:00 p.m.	1	2	0.7/3	3.28	0.6	1.50	1.3	4.78	
9	Monday, February 4, 2019	9:00 p.m.	1	4	1.1/5	4.13	0.6	1.53	1.7	5.66	
10	Thursday, February 7, 2019	8:00 p.m.	2	4	1.1/5	4.74	0.6	1.41	1.7	6.15	
11 (Note: This episode aired as a special two-hour episode.)	Friday, February 8, 2019	9:00 p.m.	1	2	1.0/5	4.38	0.6	1.44	1.6	5.82	
12	Monday, February 11, 2019	9:00 p.m.	2	4	0.8/4	3.40	0.5	1.30	1.3	4.70	
13	Wednesday, February 13, 2019	9:00 p.m.	3	6	0.9/5	3.87	0.5	1.26	1.4	5.13	

=== Canada ===
No.	Air date	Timeslot (ET)	Viewers (millions)	Rank (week)	Refs
1	Monday, January 21, 2019	8:00 p.m.	1.213	18	
2	Tuesday, January 22, 2019	8:00 p.m.	1.046	24	
3	Wednesday, January 23, 2019	8:00 p.m.	1.167	20	
4	Friday, January 25, 2019	8:00 p.m.	1.020	25	
5	Sunday, January 27, 2019	8:00 p.m.	—N/a (Note: Episode did not rank within one of the top 30 programs broadcast that week)		
6	Monday, January 28, 2019	8:00 p.m.	1.062 (Note: Average of all Celebrity Big Brother episodes aired during the week)	23	
7	Wednesday, January 30, 2019	8:00 p.m.	1.062	23	
8	Saturday, February 2, 2019	8:00 p.m.	1.062	23	
9	Monday, February 4, 2019	9:00 p.m.	1.138	19	
10	Thursday, February 7, 2019	8:00 p.m.	1.138	19	
11	Friday, February 8, 2019	9:00 p.m.	1.138	19	
12	Monday, February 11, 2019	9:00 p.m.	—N/a		
13	Wednesday, February 13, 2019	9:00 p.m.	1.070	27	
