= Greystone Park =

- DVD cover
- Directed by: Sean Stone
- Written by: Sean Stone; Alexander Wraith
- Produced by: Csaba Bereczky; Giullia Prenna; Kalia York
- Starring: Sean Stone; Alexander Wraith; Ella Lentini; Oliver Stone; Bruce Payne
- Cinematography: Eduardo Enrique Mayén
- Edited by: Christopher Donlon
- Production companies: Mind the GAP Productions; Headlong Entertainment
- Release date: September 6, 2012 (United Kingdom)
- Running time: 83 minutes
- Country: United States
- Language: English

Greystone Park is a 2012 found-footage horror film written by Sean Stone and Alexander Wraith, directed by Sean Stone, and starring Sean Stone, Alexander Wraith, Ella Lentini, Oliver Stone and Bruce Payne.

== Plot ==
The film is said to be based on true life experiences. Sean Stone and Alexander Wraith play filmmakers who meet at a dinner with Oliver Stone (Sean's real-life father) when Wall Street: Money Never Sleeps was being filmed in October 2009. They start to discuss ghost stories. As a result, Sean and Alexander decide to visit an abandoned psychiatric hospital in New Jersey, famous for its radical treatment of patients with mental illness, 'to explore whether or not they believe in the supernatural'. Once inside the institution, they soon discover that they are not alone.

== Cast ==
- Sean Stone as Sean
- Alexander Wraith as Alexander
- Oliver Stone as Oliver
- Ella Lentini as Antonella (credited as Antonella Lentini)
- Bruce Payne as Demon (voice)
- Michael Stone as Billy Lasher
- Pete Antico as Pete
- Monique Zordan as Monique
- John Schramm as John

== Release ==
The working titles of the film were Graystone and SecretStone. The film was released on DVD in the UK by Revolver Entertainment on August 27, 2012, under the title The Asylum Tapes. It was later released on DVD in the United States by Anderson Merchandisers on October 16.
