= Big Brother: After Dark =

- Genre: Reality television
- Country of origin: United States
- Original language: English
- No. of seasons: 14
- No. of episodes: 1,002

Production
- Executive producer: Allison Grodner
- Running time: 120–180 minutes

Original release
- Network: Showtime 2 (2007–2012); Pop (2013–2019); Slice (Canada, 2012–2017)
- Release: July 6, 2007 – September 23, 2019

Related
- Big Brother (American TV series); Celebrity Big Brother: After Dark

Big Brother: After Dark (often shortened to BBAD) is a spin-off of the American reality series Big Brother. The program debuted on Showtime 2 in the United States and Slice in Canada on July 5, 2007, as a companion show launched in conjunction with the eighth season of Big Brother; it moved to TVGN (now Pop) on June 26, 2013, coinciding with the debut of the fifteenth season of the parent series. A Canadian version of Big Brother: After Dark was also developed as a companion series to Big Brother Canada, also airing on Slice. The series did not return with the 22nd season of Big Brother in 2020; the show's cancellation has been speculated to be related to the Viacom and CBS merger that took place in 2019.

== Series overview ==
Season	Episodes	Originally released			Big Brother season
Season	Episodes	First released	Last released	Network	Big Brother season
1	74	July 6, 2007	September 17, 2007	Showtime 2	8
2	74	February 13, 2008	April 26, 2008	Showtime 2	9
3	64	July 14, 2008	September 15, 2008	Showtime 2	10
4	66	July 11, 2009	September 14, 2009	Showtime 2	11
5	69	July 9, 2010	September 14, 2010	Showtime 2	12
6	69	July 7, 2011	September 13, 2011	Showtime 2	13
7	69	July 12, 2012	September 18, 2012	Showtime 2	14
8	84	June 26, 2013	September 17, 2013	TVGN (Note: In 2013, After Dark moved from Showtime 2 to TVGN which was later re-branded into Pop. TVGN and Pop are broadcast over the same airspace the only difference being the network name.)	15
9	90	June 26, 2014	September 23, 2014	TVGN	16
10	89	June 26, 2015	September 22, 2015	Pop	17
11	90	June 24, 2016	September 21, 2016	Pop	18
12	83	June 29, 2017	September 19, 2017	Pop	19
13	90	June 28, 2018	September 25, 2018	Pop	20
14	89	June 27, 2019	September 23, 2019	Pop	21

== Broadcast and features ==
The show covered events happening in the House during 9:00p.m.–12:00a.m. PT. According to executive producer Allison Grodner, these three hours would be entertaining as "That's prime time for the Big Brother house. It's when our HouseGuests are most wide awake and having fun, talking about strategy and playing the game. People are going to see quite a bit."

When the program debuted on Showtime 2, Big Brother: After Dark aired live seven nights a week from midnight to 3:00a.m. Eastern (11:00p.m.–2:00a.m. Central) while a season of Big Brother was in progress. (Although it was tape delayed on Showtime 2's West Coast feed, this was of little consequence as some major providers offered both coastal feeds of Showtime 2 as part of the service's multiplex tier.) The show uses the same live feed footage available to Internet subscribers 24 hours a day throughout the season, though the show's producers choose the camera angles and scenes within the program. Every twenty minutes during the show, after a short promotional break showcasing Showtime's original series, a "scroll" was featured on the bottom of the screen to explain to viewers what events occurred that day prior to the start of the show. Due to the uncensored nature of the show, it was rated TV-MA-LS (for adult language and sexual situations) on Showtime 2. For the show's five-season run on Showtime 2, Big Brother: After Dark was the only first-run original program that was produced specifically for any of Showtime's seven multiplex channels (the bulk of the network's first-run original programming airs on the main Showtime channel, and is replayed on its various multiplex channels and on certain sister channels like Pop).

The majority of the shows on Big Brother: After Dark are live with certain exceptions. During the ninth season of Big Brother the April 21, 2008, episode was pre-recorded from earlier in the day due to an eviction and endurance competition still in progress at 9:00p.m. PT/12:00a.m. ET. A similar situation occurred during the twelfth season on September 7, 2010, when the remaining House-guests were woken up early specifically to pre-record that night's show. This was to avoid spoiling which House-guest had been evicted earlier in the day during a taped eviction episode. There have also been cases where a still scene and the program's theme music, "Best of Big Brother: After Dark", or reruns of recent episodes are played instead during portions of the series (such as competitions and tense situations between house-guests) the producers might rather show exclusively within the CBS broadcast, along with removing segments of House-guests humming or whistling copyrighted music, which is still a chargeable "performance" of a work under ASCAP/BMI guidelines. House-guests are also forbidden from talking about the audition and casting process or the more internal and proprietary components of the show, or some diary room confessions, along with promoting business interests. In this case, Big Brother will tell the House-guests over the house's loudspeaker system "You're not allowed to talk about production". Further violations of the singing and production talk rules earn the House-guest a call to the diary room for a producer talk, along with other rules violations.

On May 29, 2013, it was announced that Big Brother: After Dark would move to TVGN (now Pop) beginning on June 26, 2013. While it was promoted by TVGN as continuing to be shown uncensored as it was on Showtime 2, because of the content standards it voluntarily maintains due to the basic cable channel's advertiser-supported format, the TVGN/Pop airings of Big Brother: After Dark are censored for profane language (by muting of the audio) and nudity. (TVGN/Pop is, in most cases, carried on the "lifeline tier" of most cable providers that all subscribers receive, though it is carried on expanded basic or digital add-on packages in some areas; Showtime, by contrast, is not bound to any content standards as it operates as a subscription-based premium service). The TVGN/Pop version – which carries regular commercial breaks, but without the scroll out of break – airs live most nights from midnight to 3:00 a.m. ET (11:00 p.m.-2:00 a.m. Central) and on Thursdays from 1:00 to 3:00 a.m. ET (12:00-2:00 a.m. Central) on the channel's Eastern Time Zone feed, but continues to be shown on tape delay for audiences on the West Coast. The broadcast continues to air uncensored in Canada.

=== Orwell Games ===
The "Orwell Games" occur every Wednesday and Friday during the live broadcast. During the Orwell Games fans of the show are able to participate in opinion polls, hashtag battles and insider trivia. Tweets from fans are also shown live at the bottom of the screen during certain portions of the broadcast. Fans also have the opportunity to win tickets to the live finale of the current season.

== Celebrity Big Brother: After Dark ==
A similar series of the program. entitled Celebrity Big Brother: After Dark, debuted on Pop on February 7, 2018, as a spin-off to the American version of Celebrity Big Brother.
