= List of Celebrity Big Brother (American TV series) houseguests =

Celebrity Big Brother is the American adaptation of Celebrity Big Brother and second spin-off of the American version of Big Brother. It premiered on CBS on February 7, 2018, as counterprogramming to the 2018 Winter Olympics. The series is hosted by Julie Chen Moonves, (Note: Credited as Julie Chen for the first season) and is produced by Fly on the Wall Entertainment in association with Endemol Shine North America; Allison Grodner and Rich Meehan serve as executive producers.

The Celebrity HouseGuests for the first season were revealed during a live pre-show of the 2018 Grammy Awards on January 28, 2018. The first season began filming on January 31, 2018, and concluded twenty-six days later on February 25, 2018, when Marissa Jaret Winokur and Ross Mathews were announced as the winner and runner-up of the season, respectively. On May 5, 2018, CBS renewed the series for a second season, which premiered on January 21, 2019. Twelve HouseGuests were announced on January 13, 2019, during a commercial break of CBS's NFL football coverage. The second season lasted for twenty-nine days and ended on February 13, 2019, when Tamar Braxton won in a unanimous vote over Ricky Williams.

After a three-year hiatus the series was revived for a third season that premiered on February 2, 2022, this time as counterprogramming to the 2022 Winter Olympics. This is the first season to follow casting quotas for CBS, set in 2020, requiring at least half of the contracted celebrities to be black, indigenous, (and) people of color. The eleven HouseGuests were later revealed on January 26, 2022, during a commercial break for The Amazing Race. Twenty-nine days later on February 23, 2022, Miesha Tate defeated Todrick Hall in a 7 to 1 vote by the eliminated contestants.

Thirty-four participants have competed in Celebrity Big Brother, but Anthony Scaramucci was declared to be a fake HouseGuest as part of a twist. The series follows a format similar to the main edition in which players leave the game when they are "evicted" from the house by vote of their fellow HouseGuests. In 2018, Mathews and Jaret Winokur received their own aftershow, Off the Block with Ross and Marissa, that aired alongside the twentieth season of Big Brother. In addition, some of the contestants returned for the subsequent seasons of both the celebrity and civilian editions to host competitions. Brandi Glanville previously participated in the twentieth season of the British's version of Celebrity Big Brother while Omarosa was a contestant in the Australian version of Celebrity Big Brother, entitled Big Brother VIP.

== Contestants ==
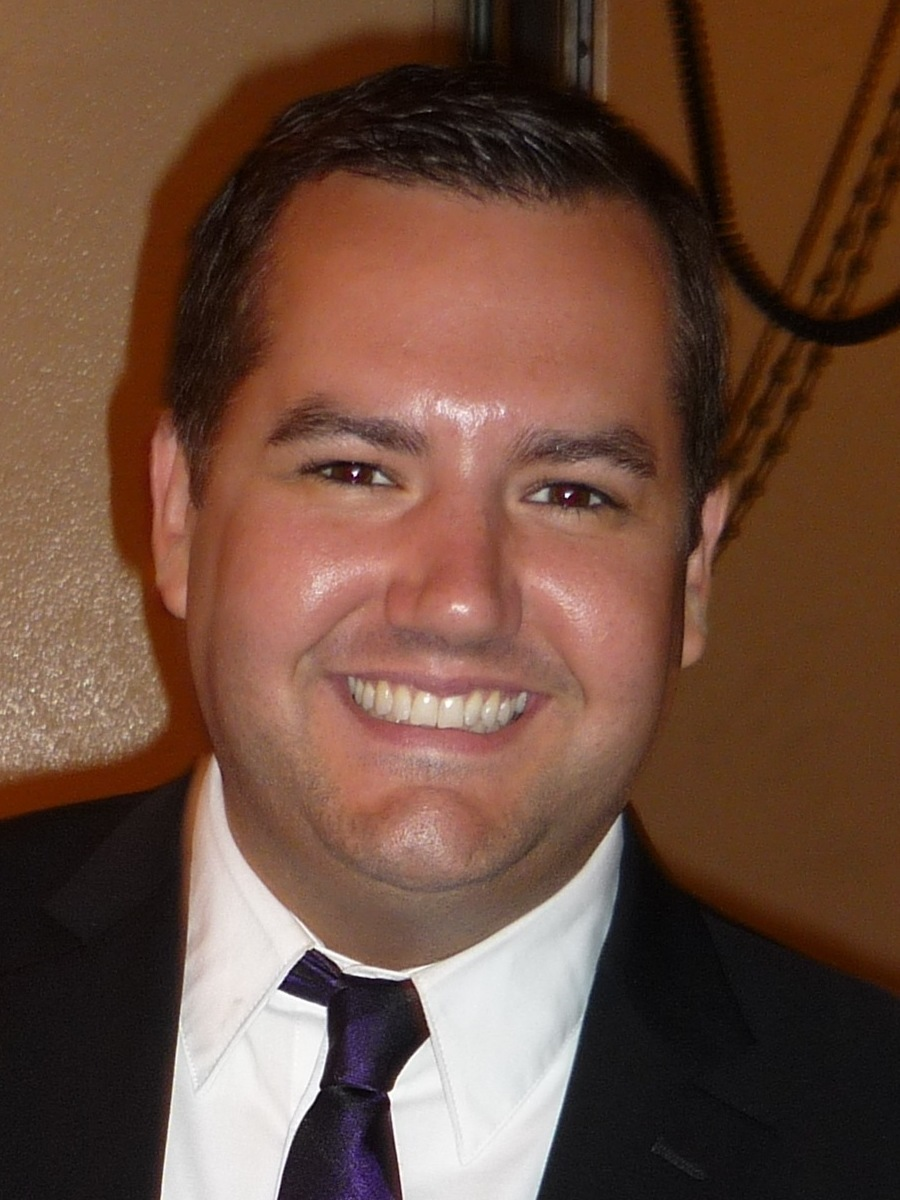
Ross Mathews, America's Favorite Houseguest and runner-up of Celebrity Big Brother 1

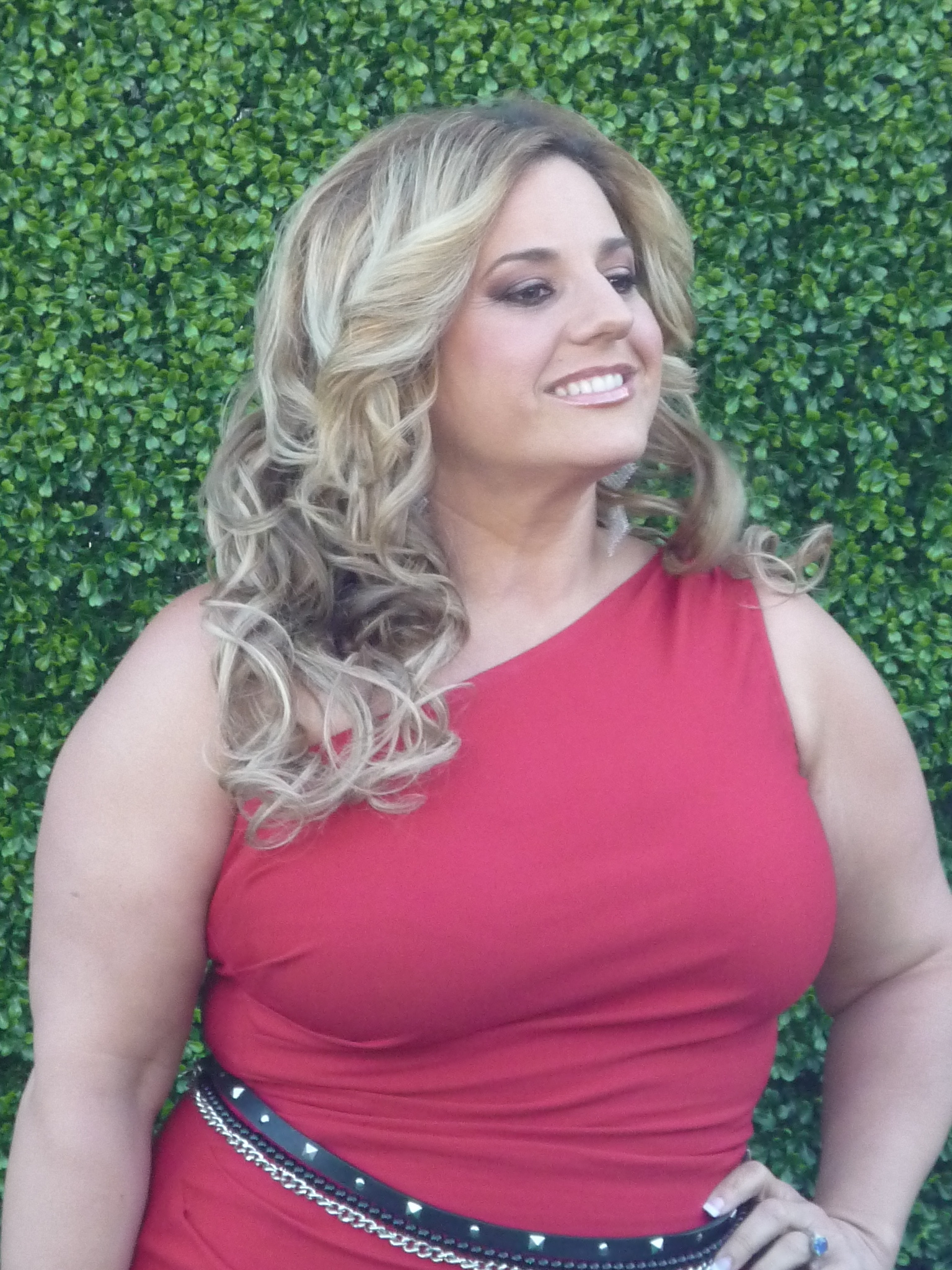
Marissa Jaret Winokur, winner of Celebrity Big Brother 1

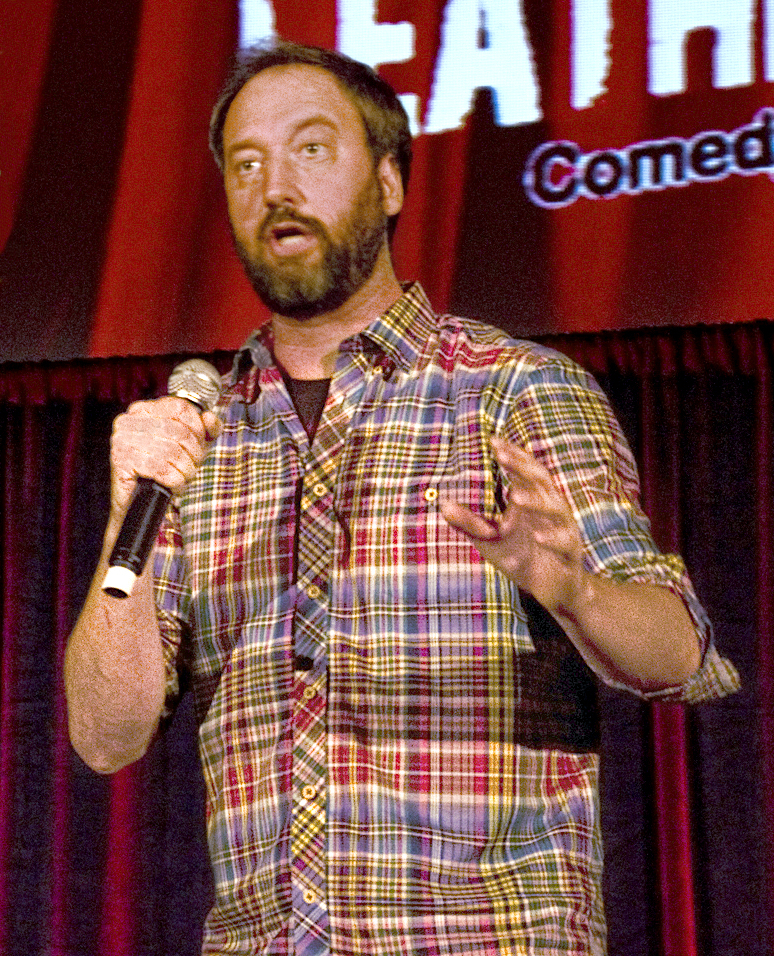
Tom Green, America's Favorite Houseguest of Celebrity Big Brother 2

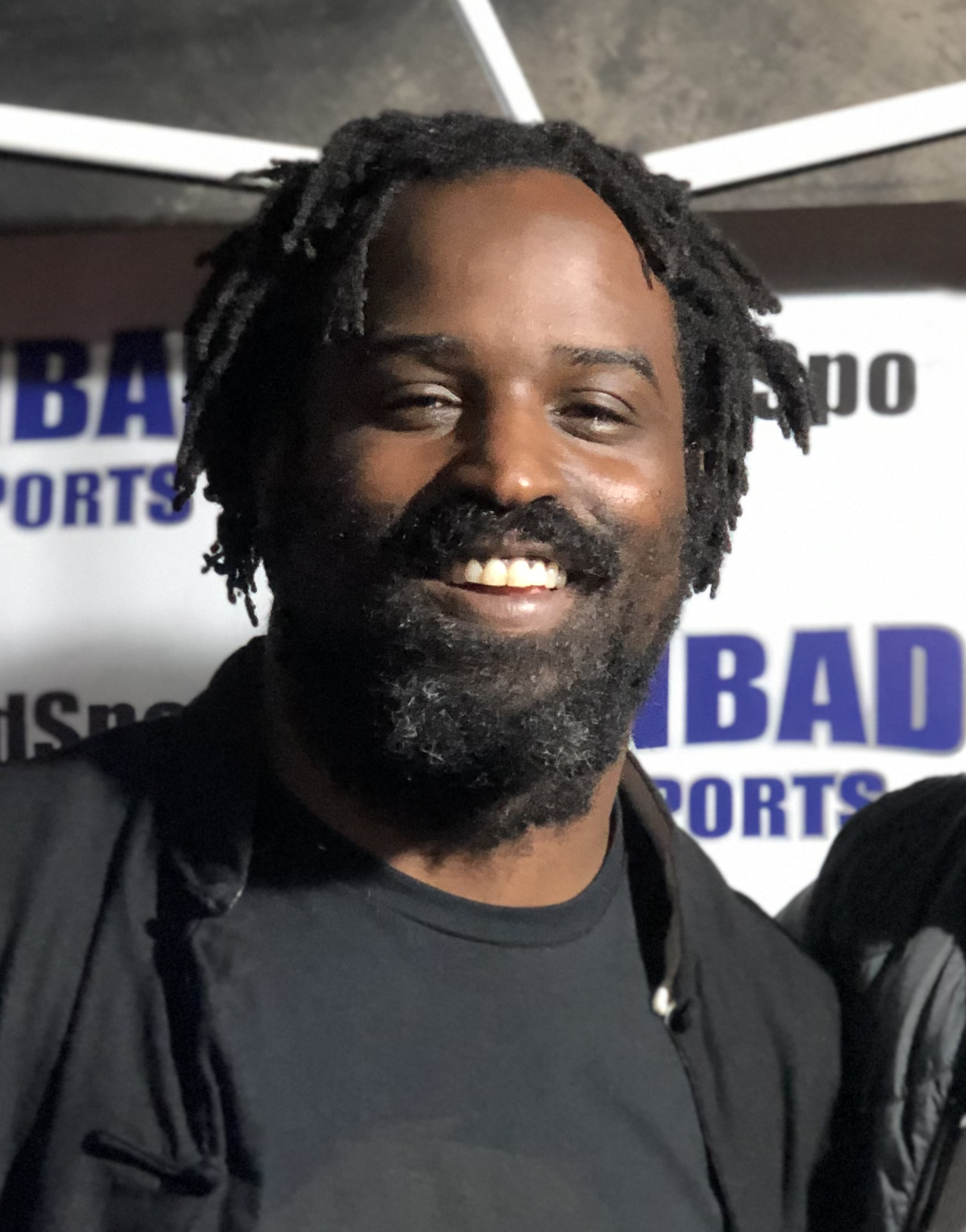
Ricky Williams, runner-up of Celebrity Big Brother 2

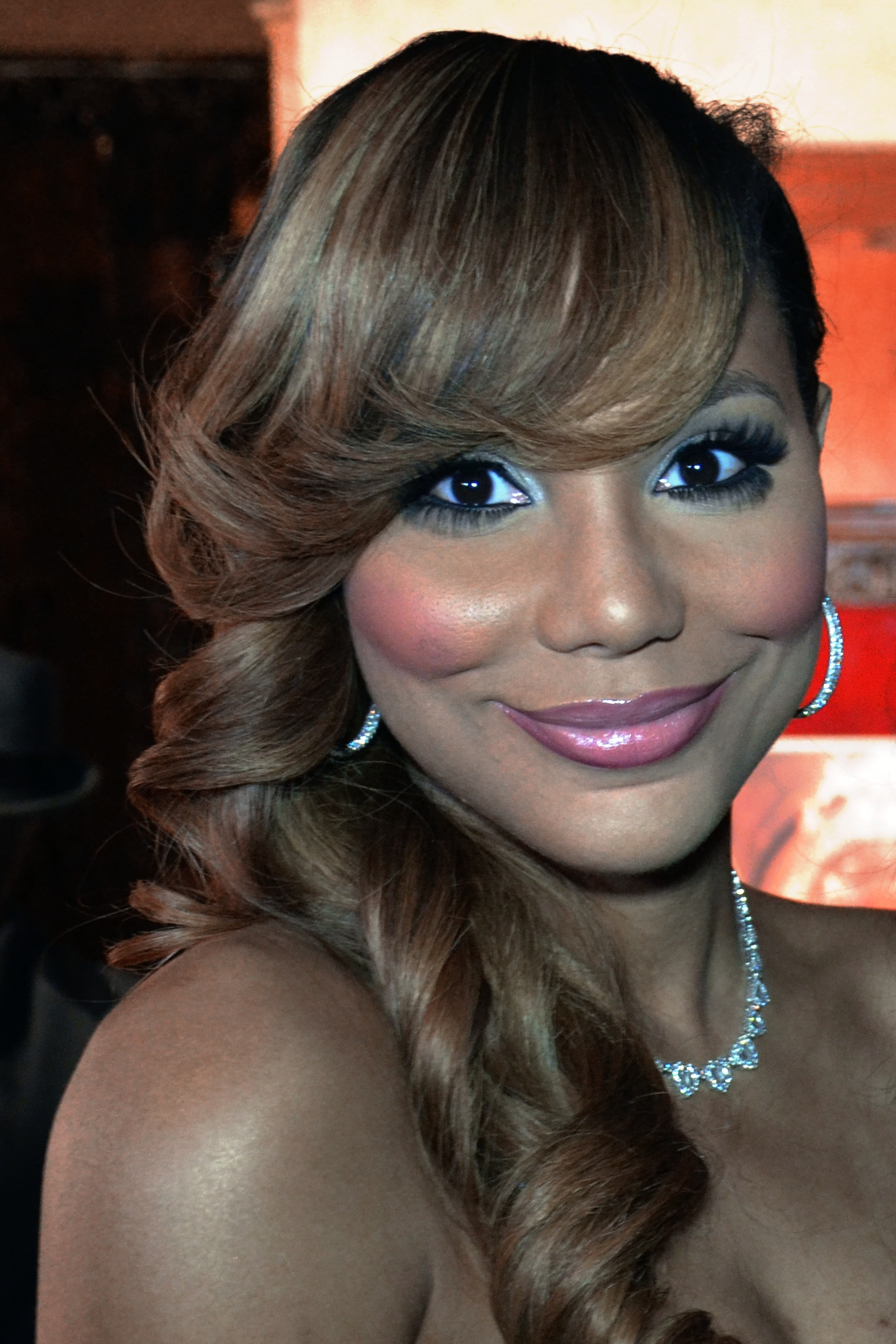
Tamar Braxton, winner of Celebrity Big Brother 2

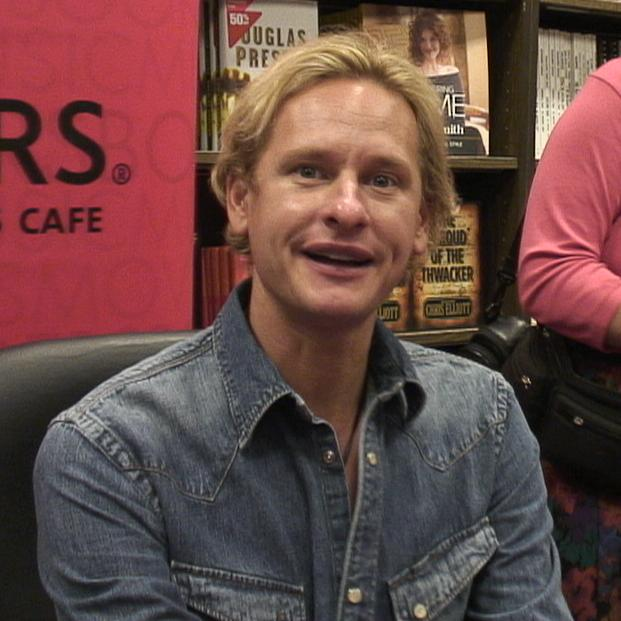
Carson Kressley, America's Favorite Houseguest of Celebrity Big Brother 3

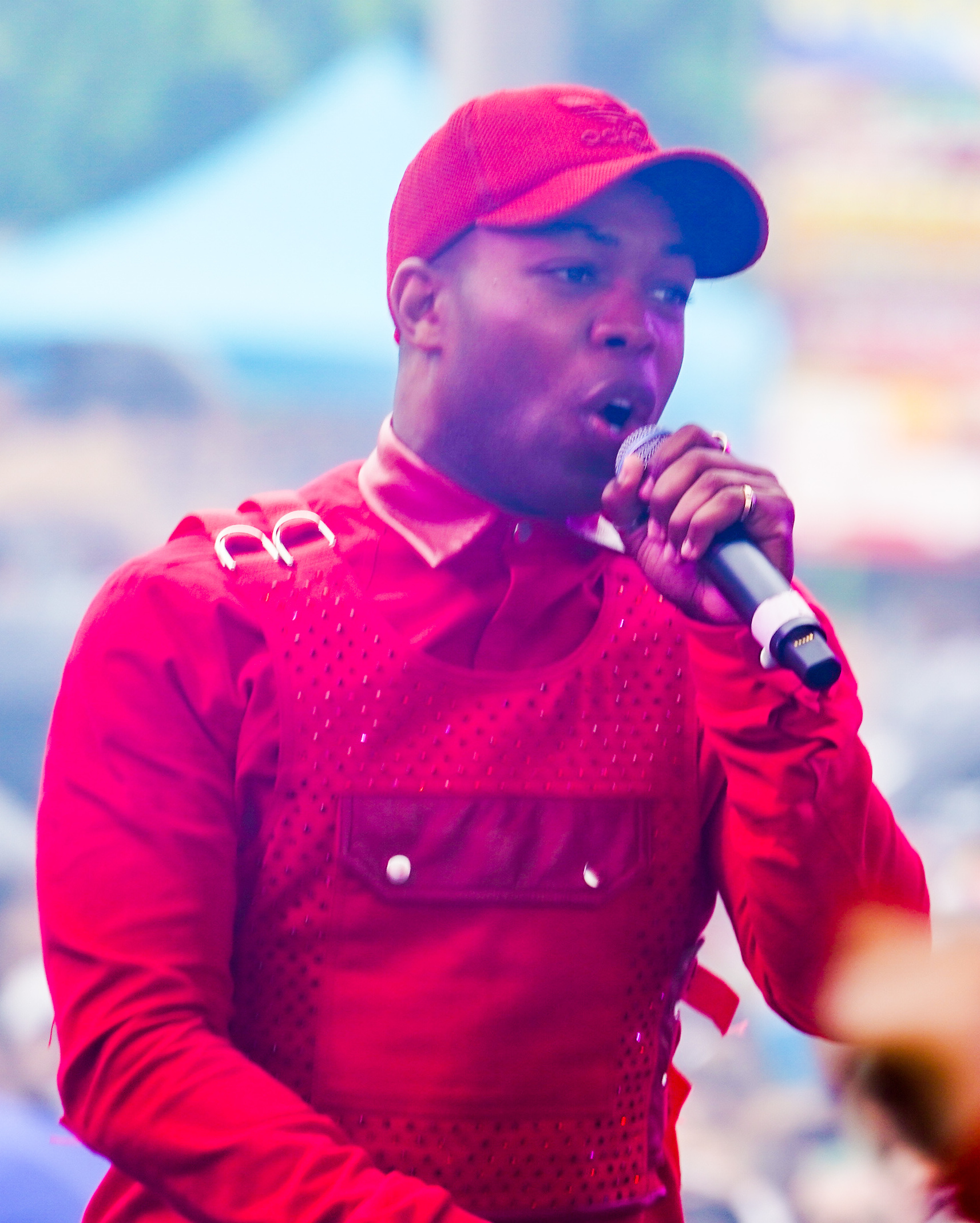
Todrick Hall, runner-up of Celebrity Big Brother 3

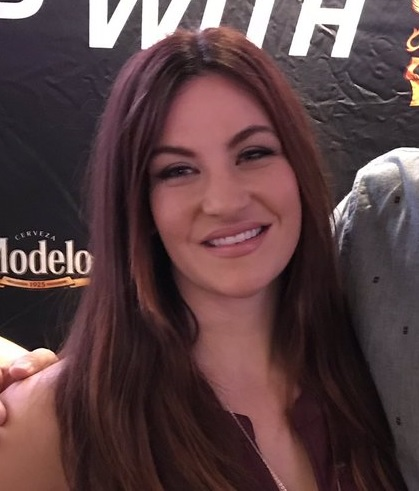
Miesha Tate, winner of Celebrity Big Brother 3

Table of Celebrity Big Brother HouseGuests
Name	Age	Hometown	Profession	Season	Status	Finish	Ref.
Chuck Liddell	48	Calabasas, CA	Retired UFC fighter	Celebrity; Big Brother 1	Evicted: Day 10	11th	
Keshia Knight Pulliam	38	Atlanta, GA	Actress/entrepreneur	Celebrity; Big Brother 1	Evicted: Day 13	10th	
Shannon Elizabeth	44	Cape Town, South Africa	Actress/conservationist	Celebrity; Big Brother 1	Evicted: Day 17	9th	
Metta World Peace	38	Los Angeles, CA	Former NBA player	Celebrity; Big Brother 1	Evicted: Day 20	8th	
Brandi Glanville	45	Los Angeles, CA	Reality television personality	Celebrity; Big Brother 1	Evicted: Day 24	7th	
James Maslow	27	Venice, CA	Actor/musician	Celebrity; Big Brother 1	Evicted: Day 24	6th	
Omarosa Manigault	44	Jacksonville, FL	Television personality	Celebrity; Big Brother 1	Evicted: Day 26	5th	
Ariadna Gutiérrez	24	Miami, FL	Actress/model	Celebrity; Big Brother 1	Evicted: Day 26	4th	
Mark McGrath	49	Studio City, CA	Musician	Celebrity; Big Brother 1	Evicted: Day 26	3rd	
Ross Mathews	38	Palm Springs, CA	Television host	Celebrity; Big Brother 1	Finalist: Day 26	2nd	
Marissa Jaret Winokur	44	Toluca Lake, CA	Actress	Celebrity; Big Brother 1	Finalist: Day 26	1st	
Anthony Scaramucci	55	Port Washington, NY	Former White House director of communications/financier	Celebrity; Big Brother 2	Left: Day 6	N/A	
Jonathan Bennett	37	Rossford, OH	Actor/Talk show host	Celebrity; Big Brother 2	Evicted: Day 10	11th	
Ryan Lochte	34	Daytona Beach, FL	12-time Olympic medal-winning swimmer	Celebrity; Big Brother 2	Evicted: Day 13	10th	
Joey Lawrence	42	Philadelphia, PA	Actor/producer	Celebrity; Big Brother 2	Evicted: Day 18	9th	
Kato Kaelin	59	Milwaukee, WI	Actor/host	Celebrity; Big Brother 2	Evicted: Day 20	8th	
Natalie Eva Marie	34	North Tustin, CA	Former WWE wrestler/Actress	Celebrity; Big Brother 2	Evicted: Day 24	7th	
Tom Green	47	Ottawa, Ontario	Comedian	Celebrity; Big Brother 2	Evicted: Day 24	6th	
Kandi Burruss	42	Atlanta, GA	Singer/reality television personality	Celebrity; Big Brother 2	Evicted: Day 29	5th	
Dina Lohan	56	Long Island, NY	Momager	Celebrity; Big Brother 2	Evicted: Day 29	4th	
Lolo Jones	36	Baton Rouge, LA	Olympic track and bobsled star	Celebrity; Big Brother 2	Evicted: Day 29	3rd	
Ricky Williams	41	Venice Beach, CA	Former NFL running back	Celebrity; Big Brother 2	Finalist: Day 29	2nd	
Tamar Braxton	41	Washington, DC	Singer/reality television personality	Celebrity; Big Brother 2	Finalist: Day 29	1st	
Teddi Mellencamp	40	Bloomington, IN	Television personality	Celebrity; Big Brother 3	Evicted: Day 10	11th	
Mirai Nagasu	28	Montebello, CA	Olympic medalist	Celebrity; Big Brother 3	Evicted: Day 13	10th	
Chris Kattan	51	Los Angeles, CA	Comedian	Celebrity; Big Brother 3	Walked: Day 15	9th	
Chris Kirkpatrick	50	Clarion, PA	Pop star	Celebrity; Big Brother 3	Evicted: Day 17	8th	
Shanna Moakler	46	Providence, RI	Actress/former Miss USA	Celebrity; Big Brother 3	Evicted: Day 20	7th	
Carson Kressley	52	Allentown, PA	Television personality	Celebrity; Big Brother 3	Evicted: Day 24	6th	
Lamar Odom	42	New York, NY	Former NBA forward	Celebrity; Big Brother 3	Evicted: Day 27	5th	
Todd Bridges	56	San Francisco, CA	Actor	Celebrity; Big Brother 3	Evicted: Day 27	4th	
Cynthia Bailey	54	Tuscumbia, AL	Model/television personality	Celebrity; Big Brother 3	Evicted: Day 29	3rd	
Todrick Hall	36	Plainview, TX	Entertainer	Celebrity; Big Brother 3	Finalist: Day 29	2nd	
Miesha Tate	35	Tacoma, WA	UFC mixed martial artist	Celebrity; Big Brother 3	Finalist: Day 29	1st	
