= List of Celebrity Big Brother (American TV series) episodes =

Digital cover art used for the first season

Celebrity Big Brother, also known as Big Brother: Celebrity Edition, is the American adaptation of the reality competition television franchise Celebrity Big Brother, which was created by John de Mol Jr.. The series premiered on CBS as counterprogramming to NBC's coverage of the 2018 Winter Olympics on February 7, 2018. The series has aired for two seasons and focuses on a group of celebrities, known as HouseGuests, that live in a purpose-built house, known as the Big Brother house, with no contact from the outside world for approximately a month. The HouseGuests try to avoid eviction with the aim of being the last remaining HouseGuest in order to win a grand prize of $250,000. Allison Grodner and Rich Meehan (Lim Jahey) serve as executive producers and the show is produced by Fly on the Wall Entertainment in association with Endemol Shine North America. Julie Chen Moonves hosts the series, continuing a position she has held since Big Brother premiered on CBS in 2000. It is filmed in Los Angeles.

Each season consists of thirteen episodes airing over a span of two and a half weeks. All episodes are approximately 44 to 82 minutes, excluding commercials, and are broadcast in both high-definition and standard. Episodes are also available for download at the iTunes Store in standard and high definition and Amazon Video, with new episodes appearing the day after their live airings. Recent episodes are available at CBS' official Celebrity Big Brother website and the CBS App for a limited amount of time. All episodes are available on CBS All Access along with the live Internet feed allowing subscribers to watch the HouseGuests while a season is in progress. Celebrity Big Brother: After Dark is a companion show that airs on Pop concurrent with each season. After Dark provides viewers the opportunity to watch the HouseGuests live for three hours per day. In order to preserve the drama for television broadcasts, CBS does not webcast certain moments that transpire in the house, including competitions and the nomination and eviction process.

As of February 23, 2022, 41 episodes of Celebrity Big Brother have aired, concluding the third season.

== Series overview ==
| Season | Episodes | Originally released | | Days | HouseGuests | Winner | Runner-up | Final vote | Average viewers (millions) |
| Season | Episodes | First released | Last released | Days | HouseGuests | Winner | Runner-up | Final vote | Average viewers (millions) |
|---|---|---|---|---|---|---|---|---|---|
| 1 | 13 | February 7, 2018 | February 25, 2018 | 26 | 11 | Marissa Jaret Winokur | Ross Mathews | 6–3 | 5.04 |
| 2 | 13 | January 21, 2019 | February 13, 2019 | 29 | 12 | Tamar Braxton | Ricky Williams | 9–0 | 4.40 |
| 3 | 15 | February 2, 2022 | February 23, 2022 | 29 | 11 | Miesha Tate | Todrick Hall | 7–1 | 2.63 |

== Episodes ==
=== Season 1 (2018) ===
| No. overall | No. in season | Title | Day(s) | Original release date | US viewers (millions) | Rating/share (18–49) |
|---|---|---|---|---|---|---|
Week 1
| 1 | 1 | "Episode 1" | Day 1 | February 7, 2018 | 7.27 | 1.8/7 |
| 2 | 2 | "Episode 2" | Days 2–5 | February 8, 2018 | 5.49 | 1.4/5 |
| 3 | 3 | "Episode 3" | Days 6–10 | February 9, 2018 | 4.34 | 1.0/4 |
Week 2
| 4 | 4 | "Episode 4" | Day 11 | February 11, 2018 | 4.79 | 1.2/5 |
| 5 | 5 | "Episode 5" | Days 11–13 | February 12, 2018 | 5.16 | 1.3/5 |
| 6 | 6 | "Episode 6" | Days 13–14 | February 14, 2018 | 5.21 | 1.3/5 |
| 7 | 7 | "Episode 7" | Days 14–17 | February 16, 2018 | 4.38 | 1.0/4 |
Week 3
| 8 | 8 | "Episode 8" | Days 17–18 | February 18, 2018 | 4.91 | 1.2/5 |
| 9 | 9 | "Episode 9" | Days 18–20 | February 19, 2018 | 5.11 | 1.2/5 |
| 10 | 10 | "Episode 10" | Days 20–21 | February 21, 2018 | 5.54 | 1.4/5 |
| 11 | 11 | "Episode 11" | Days 21–24 | February 23, 2018 | 4.60 | 1.1/4 |
Week 4
| 12 | 12 | "Episode 12" | Days 24–25; Various (Note: The HouseGuests looked back over their time in the game on Day 24. Flashbacks were shown that featured content from the previous twenty-three days.) | February 24, 2018 | 3.54 | 0.9/4 |
| 13 | 13 | "Episode 13" | Days 25–26 | February 25, 2018 | 5.21 | 1.4/5 |

=== Season 2 (2019) ===
| No. overall | No. in season | Title | Day(s) | Original release date | US viewers (millions) | Rating/share (18–49) |
|---|---|---|---|---|---|---|
Week 1
| 14 | 1 | "Episode 1" | Day 1 | January 21, 2019 | 5.36 | 1.4/6 |
| 15 | 2 | "Episode 2" | Days 1–3 | January 22, 2019 | 4.88 | 1.3/6 |
| 16 | 3 | "Episode 3" | Days 3–5 | January 23, 2019 | 4.42 | 1.1/5 |
| 17 | 4 | "Episode 4" | Days 5–10 | January 25, 2019 | 4.54 | 1.0/5 |
Week 2
| 18 | 5 | "Episode 5" | Days 10–11 | January 27, 2019 | 4.71 | 1.0/4 |
| 19 | 6 | "Episode 6" | Days 11–13 | January 28, 2019 | 4.61 | 1.1/5 |
| 20 | 7 | "Episode 7" | Days 13–15 | January 30, 2019 | 4.82 | 1.2/5 |
| 21 | 8 | "Episode 8" | Days 15–18 | February 2, 2019 | 3.28 | 0.7/3 |
Week 3
| 22 | 9 | "Episode 9" | Days 18–20 | February 4, 2019 | 4.13 | 1.1/5 |
| 23 | 10 | "Episode 10" | Days 20–21 | February 7, 2019 | 4.74 | 1.1/5 |
| 24 | 11 | "Episode 11" | Days 21–24 | February 8, 2019 | 4.38 | 1.0/5 |
Week 4
| 25 | 12 | "Episode 12" | Days 24–25; Various (Note: The HouseGuests looked back over their time in the game on Day 24. Flashbacks were shown that featured content from the previous twenty-three days.) | February 11, 2019 | 3.40 | 0.8/4 |
| 26 | 13 | "Episode 13" | Days 24–29 | February 13, 2019 | 3.87 | 0.9/5 |

=== Season 3 (2022) ===
| No. overall | No. in season | Title | Day(s) | Original release date | U.S. viewers (millions) | Rating (18–49) |
|---|---|---|---|---|---|---|
Week 1
| 27 | 1 | "Episode 1" | Day 1 | February 2, 2022 | 3.76 | 0.8 |
| 28 | 2 | "Episode 2" | Days 1–5 | February 3, 2022 | 2.66 | 0.5 |
| 29 | 3 | "Episode 3" | Days 5–10 | February 4, 2022 | 2.33 | 0.4 |
Week 2
| 30 | 4 | "Episode 4" | Days 10–11 | February 6, 2022 | 2.61 | 0.5 |
| 31 | 5 | "Episode 5" | Days 11–13 | February 7, 2022 | 2.36 | 0.4 |
| 32 | 6 | "Episode 6" | Days 13–14 | February 9, 2022 | 2.92 | 0.6 |
| 33 | 7 | "Episode 7" | Days 14–17 | February 11, 2022 | 2.53 | 0.4 |
Week 3
| 34 | 8 | "Episode 8" | Days 17–18 | February 13, 2022 | 1.52 | 0.3 |
| 35 | 9 | "Episode 9" | Days 18–20 | February 14, 2022 | 2.63 | 0.4 |
| 36 | 10 | "Episode 10" | Days 20–21 | February 16, 2022 | 3.09 | 0.5 |
| 37 | 11 | "Episode 11" | Days 21–24 | February 18, 2022 | 2.67 | 0.5 |
Week 4
| 38 | 12 | "Episode 12" | Day 24; Various (Note: On Day 24 the HouseGuests looked back over their time in the game. Flashbacks were shown that featured content from the previous 23 days.) | February 19, 2022 | 1.60 | 0.3 |
| 39 | 13 | "Episode 13" | Day 24–25 | February 20, 2022 | 2.96 | 0.5 |
| 40 | 14 | "Episode 14" | Day 25–27 | February 21, 2022 | 2.45 | 0.4 |
| 41 | 15 | "Episode 15" | Day 26–29 | February 23, 2022 | 3.51 | 0.7 |

== Ratings ==
Celebrity Big Brother had a strong series premiere with the highest ratings since the premiere of Big Brother 13 on July 7, 2011. The series debuted to 7.27 million viewers with a 1.8/7 rating in the 18-49 demographic. The remainder of the first season was scheduled as counterprogramming to NBC's coverage of the 2018 Winter Olympics. The first season finale aired on February 25, 2018 with 5.2 million viewers with a 1.4/5 rating in the 18-49 demographic coming in second behind the closing ceremony for the Olympics. The first season averaged 5.04 million viewers per episode.

The second season premiere was down compared to the first season with 5.36 million viewers with a 1.4/6 in the 18-49 demographic. The eighth episode of the second season pulled in the lowest ratings of the season with 3.28 million viewers. The finale for the second season was watched by 3.87 million viewers which was below season average levels for the program. The second season averaged a total of 4.40 million viewers.

Celebrity Big Brother : U.S. viewers per episode (millions)
Audience measurement performed by Nielsen Media Research
