= Carson Kressley =

American TV personality, actor and designer

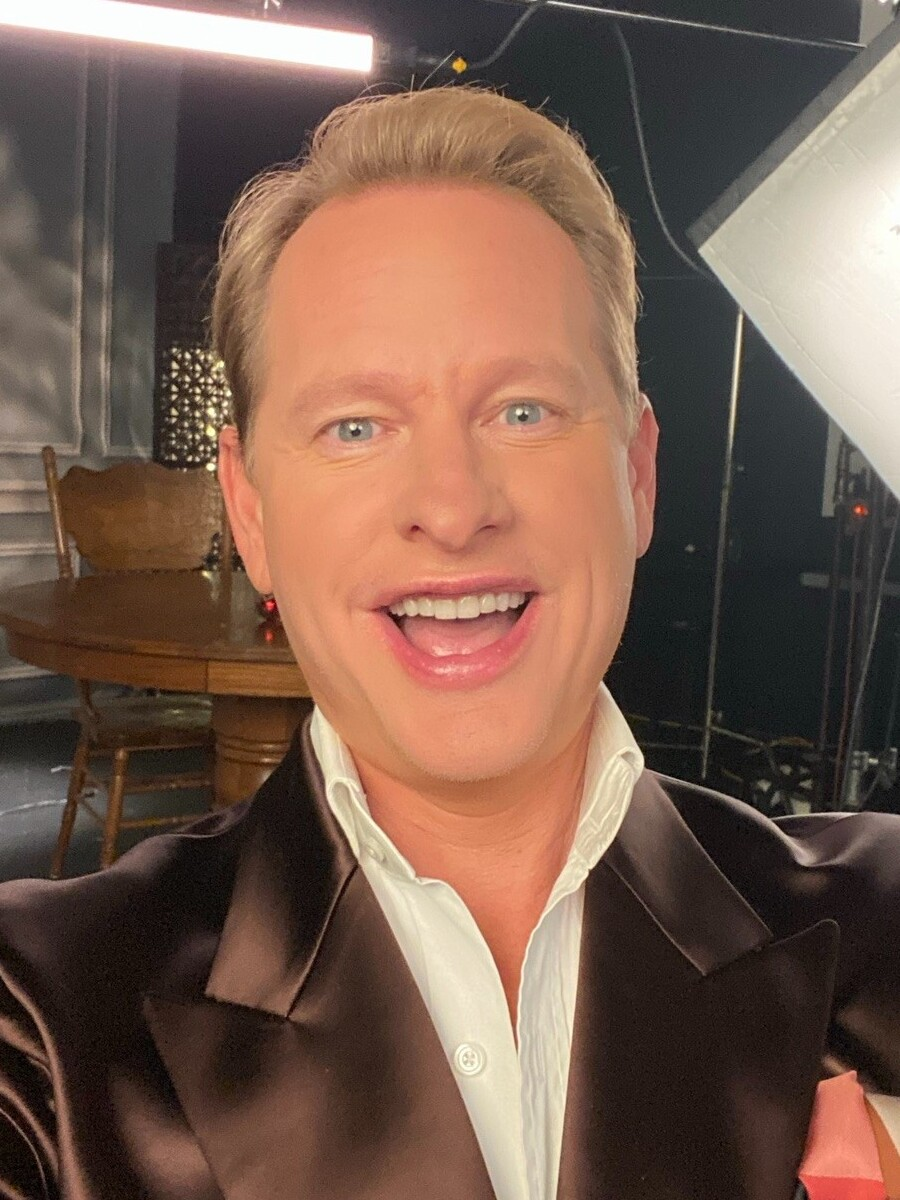
- Kressley in 2024
- Born: November 11, 1969 (age 57); Allentown, Pennsylvania, U.S.
- Education: Gettysburg College
- Occupations: Television host; actor; writer; producer; stylist
- Years active: 1994−present
- Height: 177 cm (5 ft 10 in)
- Board member of: The True Colors Fund; The American Saddlebred Museum; Thomas Jefferson University
- Awards: Outstanding Reality Program (Primetime Emmy - 2004) for Queer Eye for the Straight Guy

Carson Kressley (born November 11, 1969) is an American television personality, actor, and designer. Beginning in 2003, he appeared in the Bravo series Queer Eye for the Straight Guy. He was also the motivational host of the TV show How to Look Good Naked and OWN's Carson Nation and a contestant on season 13 of Dancing with the Stars.

Since 2015, Kressley has been a judge on RuPaul's Drag Race. Beginning in October 2018, he teamed up with former Queer Eye colleague Thom Filicia for a new series called Get a Room with Carson & Thom on Bravo. The series followed the two as Thom mentored Carson in the interior design business, and featured two clients in each episode. The show lasted one ten-episode season on Bravo, with the final episode broadcast on December 22, 2018. Kressley has also starred in six seasons on the acclaimed Food Network series BBQ BRAWL as head judge and host.

== Early life and education ==
Kressley was born on November 11, 1969 in Allentown, Pennsylvania, and raised in nearby Orefield, Pennsylvania. His family raised ponies. He competed in equestrian events from an early age and was a member of the U.S. World Cup Saddle Seat equitation team in 1999. One of his horses won a World Championship in 2009.

He graduated from Northwestern Lehigh High School in New Tripoli, Pennsylvania, in 1987. In 1991, he earned a bachelor's degree from Gettysburg College, where he was elected to Phi Beta Kappa and was a member of Alpha Phi Omega, a service fraternity.

== Career ==
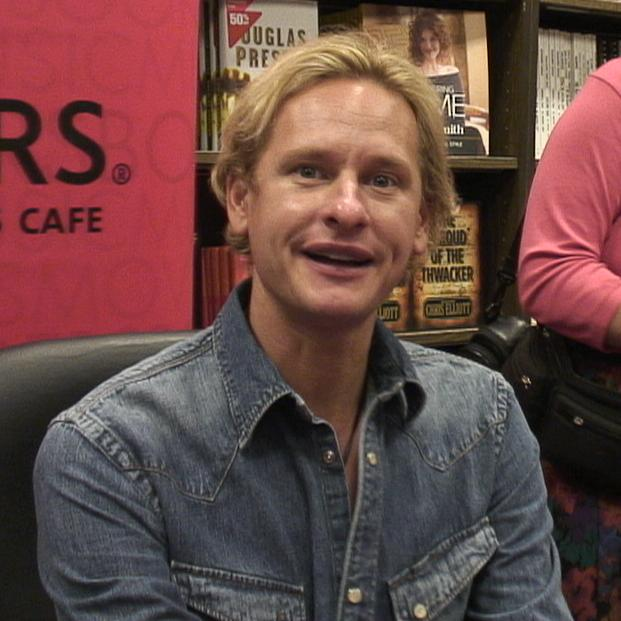
Kressley in 2005

Kressley began his career as an independent stylist, then worked for Ralph Lauren from 1994 until 2002, working in menswear and corporate advertising. In 2003, Kressley gained exposure as the fashion savant on Queer Eye when the show debuted on the Bravo cable television network. Kressley appears on Good Morning America, the E! Network, and others. Furthermore, he has critiqued red carpet fashions at the Oscars and the Golden Globes. In 2005, he acted as a judge for the Miss Universe pageant, which aired from Bangkok, Thailand. In 2006, he returned to the Miss Universe pageant as commentator and was a commentator for the 2006 Miss USA pageant.

In February 2007, he was the host of a new Lifetime makeover show, How to Look Good Naked, a U.S. version of a British series. The show's premiere episode on January 4, 2008, drew a record 1.6 million viewers, included significant viewership among adults 18-49 and adults 18–34 as well as the network's target demographic of women aged 18–34. In January 2008, the debut episode of How to Look Good Naked was Lifetime's highest-rated premiere in those three demographics.

Kressley appeared as Master of Ceremonies on Cyndi Lauper's True Colors tour in 2008. He was a host on the ABC series True Beauty, along with Vanessa Minnillo and Beth Stern. In 2011, Kressley began a show, Carson Nation, on the Oprah Winfrey Network.

In 2018, Kressley joined with his former Queer Eye teammate Thom Filicia for Get a Room with Carson & Thom on Bravo. The program lasted one season, covering ten episodes that were broadcast from October through December 2018.

In September 2026, Kressley launched his interview podcast Off the Cuff.

=== Contestant ===
- In November 2006, Kressley competed on a celebrity edition of Jeopardy against Regis Philbin and Nancy Grace. Carson took second place, losing by one dollar.
- In September 2011, Kressley was a participant on the 13th season of Dancing with the Stars, partnered with professional dancer Anna Trebunskaya. Kressley proved to be a fan favorite but was voted off week five of the competition.
- In August 2016, Kressley appeared on Celebrity Family Feud with members of his family.
- In January 2017, Kressley appeared as a contestant on The New Celebrity Apprentice.
- In February 2017, Kressley became a celebrity contestant on the Australian version of I'm a Celebrity...Get Me Out of Here!.
- In August 2017, Kressley was a contestant on season 11 of Worst Cooks in America.
- In February 2015, Kressley appeared as a contestant on The Chase.
- In February 2022, Kressley appeared as a HouseGuest on the third season of Celebrity Big Brother.
- In September 2023, Kressley appeared as a contestant on season 3 of Name That Tune against Olympian Lolo Jones. Kressley won the grand prize of $125,000 for his charity of choice, The Kempton Community Center.
- Since 2023, Kressley has been part of a rotating panel of celebrities on the game show 25 Words or Less.

=== Judge ===
- He judged the Miss Universe 2005 and Miss Universe 2023 pageants.
- In May 2007, he acted as a judge on reality series Crowned: The Mother of All Pageants where mother and daughter teams compete in a beauty pageant.
- In 2015, Kressley and Ross Mathews were named as new regular judges for the seventh season of RuPaul's Drag Race. In 2016 he also became a regular judge on the spin-off RuPaul's Drag Race All Stars from its second season onwards, in 2020 he judged RuPaul's Secret Celebrity Drag Race and in 2024 he guest judged RuPaul's Drag Race Global All Stars.
- In December 2019, he appeared as a judge on the Freeform gift wrap competition, Wrap Battle.
- In June 2021, he appeared as a judge on the Food Network BBQ competition series, BBQ Brawl.
- In July 2022, he appeared as a guest judge on Food Network's Beat Bobby Flay.
- In November 2025, it was announced he would be a rotating judge on the sixth season of Canada's Drag Race.

=== Commentator ===
- In July 2006, Kressley was the commentator alongside former Miss USA, Shandi Finnessey.
- In May 2016, Kressley was announced as a commentator with Michelle Collins for the Eurovision Song Contest 2016 on Logo TV; the first time the United States has broadcast the competition live.
- In November 2017, Kressley appeared as a commentator alongside Lu Sierra and Ashley Graham for Miss Universe 2017.
- The pair also commentated in May 2018, the Miss USA 2018.
- Kressley and Sierra were slated to return at the Miss Universe 2018.
- In December 2021, Kressley along with reigning Miss Universe Andrea Meza hosted the Miss Universe 2021 preliminary competition. He also served as commentator for the finals along with Miss USA 2019, Cheslie Kryst.
- Kressley hosted "Couched with Carson Kressley", a house/garden talk show on The Roku Channel from 2020 to 2021.

=== Acting ===
In 2005, Kressley made his film debut in The Perfect Man starring Heather Locklear and Hilary Duff, playing Lance, a bartender. He starred in The Year Without a Santa Claus with John Goodman as Santa, which aired December 11, 2006, on NBC. He had a cameo role in his third movie, the independent comedy 16 to Life. The feature film It's Christmas, Carol! premiered December 2012. In 2021, he had a supporting role in The Bitch Who Stole Christmas, which aired on VH1.

=== Fashion design ===
In November 2006, Kressley debuted Perfect, his clothing for men and women, on QVC. He cites his experience as a stylist with Ralph Lauren and on Queer Eye as inspiration for the line, saying he "...realized a lot of people are missing great basics in their wardrobe. I consider my perfect collection for QVC to be 'basics with a twist.'" He debuted a new women's collection for Shop NBC in April 2012. The collection, called "Love, Carson", is built on transformative pieces that provide women with affordable glamour.

=== Books ===
- 2004: author of the 2004 book Off The Cuff: The essential style guide for men and the women who love them (ISBN 0-525-94836-8)
- 2004: co-author, Queer Eye for the Straight Guy: The Fab Five's Guide to Looking Better, Cooking Better, Dressing Better, Behaving Better, and Living Better (Clarkson Potter), with the four other cast members
- 2005: author of You're Different and That's Super, a children's story deriving inspiration from the classic tale "The Ugly Duckling", featuring a unicorn who grows up among a herd of horses from foalhood to maturity
- 2016: author (with Riann Smith) of Does This Book Make My Butt Look Big?: A Cheeky Guide to Feeling Sexier in Your Own Skin and Unleashing Your Personal Style

=== Other activities ===
In April 2006, Kressley became ordained over the Internet as a minister of the Universal Life Church, in order to be able to perform a wedding ceremony during an episode of Queer Eye.

Kressley is also an owner of American Saddlebred horses and is horse show exhibitor. He won a world title in 2009. Kressley's interest in horses combined with his interest in promoting respect for diversity resulted in his authorship of 'You're Different and That's Super!', illustrated by cartoonist Jared Lee.

Kressley was an ambassador for the Melbourne Cup in 2007, playing a part in the "Fashion On The Field".

== Awards and nominations ==
=== Emmy Awards ===
Year	Category	Work	Result	Ref.
2004	Outstanding Reality Program	Queer Eye	Won	
2005	Outstanding Reality Program	Queer Eye	Nominated	
2023	Outstanding Reality Competition Program	RuPaul's Drag Race	Won	
2024	Outstanding Reality Competition Program	RuPaul's Drag Race	Nominated	
2025	Outstanding Reality Competition Program	RuPaul's Drag Race	Nominated	

=== Producers Guild of America Awards ===
Year	Category	Work	Result	Ref.
2022	Outstanding Producer of Game & Competition Television	RuPaul's Drag Race	Won	
2023	Outstanding Producer of Game & Competition Television	RuPaul's Drag Race All Stars	Nominated	
2024	Outstanding Producer of Game & Competition Television	RuPaul's Drag Race	Won	
2025	Outstanding Producer of Game & Competition Television	RuPaul's Drag Race	Nominated	

== Filmography ==
=== Television ===
Year	Title	Role	Notes
2003-2007	Queer Eye	Himself	100 episodes
2004-2021	Live with Kelly and Ryan	Himself	Guest (36 episodes)
2005–2021	Good Morning America	Himself	Guest (10 episodes)
2006	Jeopardy!	Contestant	2nd place (1 episode)
2007–2008	Crowned: The Mother of All Pageants	Judge	8 episodes
2008–2021	The Wendy Williams Show	Himself	Guest (13 episodes)
2008	Big Brother Australia	Himself	Season 8, Guest, (1 episode)
2008	Kathy Griffin: My Life on the D-List	Himself	"Fly the Super Gay Skies"
2011–2022	Watch What Happens Live with Andy Cohen	Himself	Guest (7 episodes)
2011	Dancing with the Stars	Contestant	Season 13; Eliminated, 8th place (13 episodes)
2012	It's Christmas, Carol!		
2015-present	RuPaul's Drag Race	Judge	Season 7 - present
2016–present	RuPaul's Drag Race All Stars	Judge	Season 2 - present
2017	The New Celebrity Apprentice	Contestant	Season 15; Eliminated, 5th place (5 episodes)
2017	Worst Cooks in America	Contestant	Season 11: Celebrity Edition 3; Eliminated, 7th place (3 episodes)
2018	Get a Room with Carson & Thom	Himself	10 episodes
2018	Real Housewives of Potomac	Himself	Guest (Season 3, Episode 11)
2019	Wrap Battle	Judge	Season 1 (6 episodes)
2020–present	RuPaul's Secret Celebrity Drag Race	Judge	Season 1 - present
2021–present	BBQ Brawl	Judge	Season 2 - present (54 episodes)
2022	Celebrity Big Brother	Contestant	Season 3; Eliminated, 6th place & America's Favorite HouseGuest (13 episodes)
2022	Beat Bobby Flay	Himself	Guest host (1 episode)
2023	25 Words or Less (game show)	Contestant	Celebrity contestant
2023	Celebrity Name That Tune	Contestant	Season 3, Episode 6
2024	RuPaul's Drag Race Global All Stars	Judge	Season 1, Episode 5
2025–present	Canada's Drag Race	Judge	Season 6-present
2025	Celebrity Weakest Link	Contestant	4th place

== See also ==
- LGBT culture in New York City
- List of LGBT people from New York City
