= You're Different and That's Super =

Children's picture book by Carson Kressley

- Author: Carson Kressley
- Illustrator: Jared Lee
- Language: English
- Genre: Children's book
- Publisher: Simon and Schuster
- Publication date: 2005
- Publication place: United States
- Media type: Hardcover
- ISBN: 978-1-416-90070-2

You're Different and That's Super (ISBN 9781416900702) is the name of a children's book by Queer Eye for the Straight Guy fashion expert Carson Kressley, published in October 2005 by Simon and Schuster. The pictures were by Jared D. Lee.

== Synopsis ==
Trumpet is an orphaned white colt who grows up on a horse farm alongside regular coals. As he gets older, he develops a horn on his forehead. Trumpet realizes that he is a unicorn and struggles with feeling different before learning to embrace his individuality.
