= Remodeled =

2012 American reality television series

- Genre: Reality
- Presented by: Paul Fisher
- Starring: Olga Tavarez; Joseph Villanueva
- Country of origin: United States
- Original language: English
- No. of seasons: 1
- No. of episodes: 8

Production
- Executive producers: Allison Grodner; Rich Meehan; Amy Palmer Robertson; Rachel Tung; Paul Fisher; Greg Seuss; Erik Stone
- Camera setup: Single-camera
- Running time: 45 minutes
- Production companies: Fly on the Wall Entertainment; Sony Pictures Television

Original release
- Network: The CW
- Release: January 17 – August 20, 2012

Remodeled is an American reality television series which premiered on The CW as a midseason replacement on January 17, 2012. The program was greenlighted to series status on May 17, 2011, to air in the 2011–12 television season. The hour-long series is hosted by modeling expert Paul Fisher and is produced by Fly on the Wall Entertainment and Sony Pictures Television. Executive producers are Allison Grodner, Rich Meehan, Amy Palmer Robertson, Rachel Tung, Greg Seuss, and Erik Stone.

== Premise ==
Each episode Paul Fischer visits small-town agencies all over the United States in order to add them into 'The Network', a conglomeration of all the agencies he has visited, in the hopes of finding tomorrow's supermodels. Each agency, usually a run down scam-like agency, is completely made over to become a legitimate respectable agency. Simultaneously he and his team, Anna Alschbach, Joseph Villanueva, J.T, and Olga Tavarez, scout model hopefuls and send them to castings for fashion week and other clients. Models featured and discovered on the show include Annelise Adams, Bobby Rake, Mexico's Next Top Model winner Mariana Bayón, Guess model Meghan Wiggins, Levi Strauss & Co. model Halle Arbaugh and Shaughnessy Brown.

Agencies featured on the show include:

- Arquette & Associates in Minneapolis, Minnesota (episode 1)
- Fierce Modeling School and Agency in Rapid City, South Dakota (episode 2)
- Emerge Talent Management in Orlando, Florida (episode 3)
- Courtier Model and Talent Management in Phoenix, Arizona (episode 4)
- Centro Models in St. Louis, Missouri (episode 5)
- Blaze Modelz in Hermosa Beach, California (episode 6)
- Active Image Models in Columbus, Ohio (episode 7)
- Las Vegas Models, Lenz Agency in Las Vegas, Nevada (episode 8)

== Episodes ==
Title	Original air date	Rating/Share (18-49)	Viewers (millions)
"A Latte to Learn"	January 17, 2012	0.3	0.67
"Modeling Agency or Modeling School?"	January 24, 2012	0.4	0.89
"The Gummy Bear"	February 1, 2012	0.3	0.69
"3 Men and a Little Agency"	February 8, 2012	0.3	0.63
"Attitude Adjustment"	February 15, 2012	0.2	0.46
"Sending the Wrong Image"	February 22, 2012	0.3	0.71
"All in the Family"	August 13, 2012	0.1	0.41
"Hold 'Em or Fold 'Em"	August 20, 2012	0.2	0.48

== Ratings ==
The show premiered with one of The CW's lowest rated premieres ever.

== Awards ==
The series earned the award for best reality program at the 2012 Banff World Media Festival.
