= Celebrity Big Brother 3 (American season) =

- Season 3
- Title card for the season
- Presented by: Julie Chen Moonves
- No. of days: 29
- No. of houseguests: 11
- Winner: Miesha Tate
- Runner-up: Todrick Hall
- America's Favorite Celebrity HouseGuest: Carson Kressley
- No. of episodes: 15

Release
- Original network: CBS
- Original release: February 2 – February 23, 2022

Additional information
- Filming dates: January 26 – February 23, 2022

Season chronology
- ← Previous; Season 2

Celebrity Big Brother 3 is the third and final season of the American reality television series Celebrity Big Brother. It premiered on February 2, 2022, on CBS. The show chronicles a group of celebrities (known as HouseGuests) who moved into a house under constant surveillance and with no contact from the outside world. They are competing for power and safety before voting to evict one of their fellow HouseGuests out of the house.

The season concluded on February 23, 2022, where Miesha Tate defeated Todrick Hall by a final jury vote of 7 to 1. Carson Kressley was named America's Favorite HouseGuest.

The season was announced in September 2021 after a two-year hiatus and aired 15 episodes on CBS, as counterprogramming to the 2022 Winter Olympics. Additional content related to the season was released on Paramount+. Julie Chen Moonves returned as host while Allison Grodner and Rich Meehan returned as executive producers. The contestants for the season were announced in January 2022.

== HouseGuests ==
The cast of Celebrity Big Brother 3 L–R: Shanna Moakler, Chris Kirkpatrick, Miesha Tate, Todrick Hall, Chris Kattan, Carson Kressley, Cynthia Bailey, Lamar Odom, Teddi Mellencamp, Todd Bridges and Mirai Nagasu

The eleven HouseGuests were revealed on January 26, 2022, during a commercial break for the thirty-third season of The Amazing Race. Prior to the reveal, Chen Moonves revealed several clues regarding the identities of the HouseGuests.

Name	Age on entry	Notability	Result
Miesha Tate	35	UFC mixed martial artist	Winner; Day 29
Todrick Hall	36	Singer, dancer, and YouTuber	Runner-up; Day 29
Cynthia Bailey	54	Model and TV personality	Evicted; Day 29
Todd Bridges	56	Actor	Evicted; Day 27
Lamar Odom	42	Former NBA forward	Evicted; Day 27
Carson Kressley	52	TV personality, actor, and designer	Evicted; Day 24
Shanna Moakler	46	Model, actress, and TV personality	Evicted; Day 20
Chris Kirkpatrick	50	Singer	Evicted; Day 17
Chris Kattan	51	Actor and comedian	Quit; Day 15
Mirai Nagasu	28	Olympic figure skater	Evicted; Day 13
Teddi Mellencamp	40	TV personality	Evicted; Day 10

== Episodes ==
No. overall	No. in season	Title	Day(s)	Original release date	U.S. viewers (millions)	Rating (18–49)
Week 1
27	1	"Episode 1"	Day 1	February 2, 2022	3.76	0.8
On Day 1, eleven new celebrity HouseGuests enter the winter-themed Big Brother house and introduce themselves to each other. The HouseGuests begin to get settled into the house before Julie introduces the first Head of Household competition. In the competition, titled "BB Winter Gala", based on the Met Gala, HouseGuests must hold onto champagne bottles attached to strings that lift them in the air, making makeshift swings, and attempt to remain there. After making a deal with Todrick promising him safety, Miesha was the last HouseGuest remaining on their swing and became the first Head of Household of the season. Julie also teases the next twist known as the "Gala Gift" consisting of both a power and a punishment.
28	2	"Episode 2"	Days 1–5	February 3, 2022	2.66	0.5
Following the Head of Household competition Miesha builds an alliance with Todrick and Lamar, whom she considers the athletic people. Meanwhile, Todrick also forms numerous other alliances with everyone else, except for Chris Kattan and Todd. Miesha brings Chris Kirkpatrick into her alliance and sets her sights on evicting Teddi. The HouseGuests prepare to open the Gala Gift; before opening the box they learn the receiver of the gift will be immune from eviction, but they will have to wear a hat designed as a purse throughout the cycle. Beginning with Miesha, they must pass the hat from one to another; when one receives the hat they are unable to receive the immunity until there is only one person remaining: Cynthia was the last to receive the hat and was granted immunity from nomination. The HouseGuests are warned that the punishment from the Gala Gift would come eviction night. Miesha further develops her plan to backdoor Teddi by adding Mirai to her alliance. After making a deal with Teddi, Miesha shifts her plan to evicting Mirai, who was untrustworthy, by using Carson as a pawn. On Day 5, Miesha nominated Carson and Mirai for eviction.
29	3	"Episode 3"	Days 5–10	February 4, 2022	2.33	0.4
Following nominations Mirai believes that she is still a pawn. Cynthia, Lamar, and Todrick (Mirai's choice), were chosen by random draw to compete alongside Miesha, Carson, and Mirai in the Power of Veto competition. The HouseGuests competed individually using clues to assemble a daily schedule. When they believe the schedule is correct they hit the buzzer. If the order is correct their time is locked; otherwise they continue trying. Carson correctly ordered the schedule in the lowest amount of time and received the Power of Veto. Miesha contemplated backing from her deal with Teddi and nominating her for eviction. Carson used the Power of Veto on himself and Miesha nominated Teddi in his place. Before the eviction Julie informs the HouseGuests that the hat from the Gala Gift will be passed around once more; however, the last person to receive the hat will replace Mirai or Teddi on the block. Todd ultimately replaced Mirai. Todd and Teddi are given a last chance to try and save themselves. On Day 10, by a vote of 5–3, with Carson, Chris Kattan, and Cynthia voting to evict Todd, Teddi was the first HouseGuest to be evicted from the Celebrity Big Brother house.
Week 2
30	4	"Episode 4"	Days 10–11	February 6, 2022	2.61	0.5
Reeling from a hectic eviction night, the HouseGuests begin questioning others loyalties. The Formation alliance, consisting of Carson, Cynthia, Mirai, Shanna, Todrick, and formerly Teddi, experience the biggest disruption after Shanna and Todrick voted to evict Teddi instead of Todd. In the "Rotten Potatoes" Head of Household competition, based on the review aggregator website Rotten Tomatoes, HouseGuests must roll a ball up a model rotten potato so that it falls into a scored slot. If they're satisfied with the score they can lock it in and move onto the next potato; if they're unhappy with it they can roll again until they're satisfied with it. Each HouseGuest has a total of two minutes and thirty seconds to add a score from all three rotten potatoes, any potatoes without locked scores at the end of the time period results in zero points. Each potatoes score is added to their "Potatometer". At the end of the competition, Chris Kirkpatrick had the highest Potatometer, with a score of 75 and became the second Head of Household. Chris Kirkpatrick considers targeting Mirai much to the dismay of Miesha. On Day 11, Chris Kirkpatrick nominated Chris Kattan and Mirai for eviction.
31	5	"Episode 5"	Days 11–13	February 7, 2022	2.36	0.4
Chris Kirkpatrick confirms he wants Mirai to be evicted while the other HouseGuests comfort Chris Kattan and Mirai. Chris Kirkpatrick, Chris Kattan, and Mirai, alongside Todrick, Shanna, and Cynthia competed in the Valentine's Day-themed Power of Veto competition. In the competition, based on the theatrical film Marry Me, the competing HouseGuests view an image of a crowd in which everyone is holding a poster. Each image is divided into three sections and one poster contains the phrase "Marry Me"; the HouseGuests must determine which section contains this poster and lock in their answer in an attempt to gain points. At the end of seven rounds Shanna and Todrick tied with six points each. During the tiebreaker round Julie gave Shanna and Todrick a question to which the answer was a number, Shanna answered closest to the correct number without going over and was awarded the Power of Veto. Shanna chose not to use the Power of Veto, leaving Chris Kirkpatrick's nominations the same. Chris Kattan and Mirai were given a chance to sway votes their way. On Day 13, by a unanimous vote of 7–0, Mirai was the second HouseGuest to be evicted from the Celebrity Big Brother house.
32	6	"Episode 6"	Days 13–14	February 9, 2022	2.92	0.6
33	7	"Episode 7"	Days 14–17	February 11, 2022	2.53	0.4
Miesha explains that Carson is her target and that she nominated Cynthia by association. On Day 15, after experiencing personal challenges, Chris Kattan quits the game. The HouseGuests viewed a goodbye message he recorded. Lamar (Cynthia's choice), Shanna, and Todrick were chosen to compete in the Power of Veto competition alongside Carson, Cynthia, and Miesha. In the competition, called "Reindeer Riders", HouseGuests "ride" reindeer to add time to their clock. Once time is added, they build a stack of snowflakes and lock in a score. If their clock runs out without locking in a score or riding again to add additional time, they lose. Shanna had the highest score and received the Power of Veto. Despite Miesha's requests for it not to be used, Shanna saved Carson, and Miesha named Chris Kirkpatrick as the replacement. The HousGuests received updates about current events while Cynthia and Todd have a heated argument. On Day 17, by a unanimous vote of 5–0, Chris Kirkpatrick was the third HouseGuest to be evicted from the Celebrity Big Brother house. In the "Angry Glam Squad" Head of Household competition HouseGuests hold onto a wall styled as director's chairs that tilts and try not to fall.
Week 3
34	8	"Episode 8"	Days 17–18	February 13, 2022	1.52	0.3
As "nail polish" and "hair" is thrown at the HouseGuests, Lamar was the first to fall from the wall, followed by Cynthia, Todd, and Shanna; as well as Todrick, who negotiated a deal for safety, allowing Carson to become the next Head of Household. Miesha is worried that she will be nominated because none of her alliance members won the competition causing trouble between her and Todrick. Carson, Cynthia, and Shanna pitch to Todrick a final four deal, but he ultimately declines. Cynthia, Miesha, and Todrick, then inform Carson that Shanna has been playing both sides of the house in hopes that he'll nominate Shanna instead of Miesha. The four make a plan to backdoor Shanna. This later causes a nearly house-wide, only with the exception of Lamar and Todd, argument with Shanna on one side, and everyone else on the other. On Day 18, Carson nominated Miesha and Todd for eviction, with the plan to ultimately backdoor Shanna.
35	9	"Episode 9"	Days 18–20	February 14, 2022	2.63	0.4
36	10	"Episode 10"	Days 20–21	February 16, 2022	3.09	0.5
37	11	"Episode 11"	Days 21–24	February 18, 2022	2.67	0.5
Week 4
38	12	"Episode 12"	Day 24; Various (Note: On Day 24 the HouseGuests looked back over their time in the game. Flashbacks were shown that featured content from the previous 23 days.)	February 19, 2022	1.60	0.3
Over dinner, the final five HouseGuests looked back over the previous twenty-three days in the house.
39	13	"Episode 13"	Day 24–25	February 20, 2022	2.96	0.5
40	14	"Episode 14"	Day 25–27	February 21, 2022	2.45	0.4
41	15	"Episode 15"	Day 26–29	February 23, 2022	3.51	0.7
Following Todd's eviction the final three celebrate making it to finale night. Todrick reveals to Cynthia and Miesha that he's a Big Brother "superfan". Todrick pitches to Cynthia that should she win the Head of Household competition, she should take him to final two over Miesha. In the final Head of Household competition, called "Shoutouts", each of the remaining HouseGuests was eligible to compete and viewed a series of videos from evicted HouseGuests containing three quotes. In each round the competing HouseGuests must determine which quote was false and lock in an answer, with each correct answer earning a point. With three correct answers Miesha became the final Head of Household of the season. Cynthia and Todrick are each given a chance to convince Miesha to take themselves to the final two over the other. On Day 29, Miesha cast the sole vote to evict Cynthia from the Celebrity Big Brother house. Miesha and Todrick are also allowed a chance to give a final speech. The jury, consisting of all former HouseGuests with the exception of Chris Kattan, each voted on who they think should win the season. By a vote of 7–1, with Cynthia voting for Todrick to win, Miesha was declared the winner of the season winning $250,000 and Todrick became the runner-up taking $50,000 in prize money. Carson won the title of America's Favorite Celebrity HouseGuest and won $25,000.

== Voting history ==
Color key:

Winner
Runner-up
Head of Household
Nominated for eviction
Evicted
Quit

	Week 1	Week 2		Week 3		Week 4			
	Week 1	Day 11	Day 14	Day 18	Day 21	Day 25	Day 27 (Note: There was a double eviction on Day 27. Following the first eviction, the remaining HouseGuests played a round worth of games — including HoH and Veto competitions and Nomination, Veto and Eviction ceremonies—during the remainder of the live show, culminating in a second eviction for the night.)	Day 29	Finale
Head of Household	Miesha	Chris Ki.	Miesha	Carson	Todd	Todrick	Miesha	Miesha	(None)
Nominations (initial)	Carson; Mirai	Chris Ka. Mirai	Carson; Cynthia	Miesha; Todd	Carson; Lamar	Lamar; Todd	Cynthia; Todd	(None)	(None)
Veto Winner	Carson	Shanna	Shanna	Todrick	Miesha	Todd	Miesha	(None)	(None)
Nominations (final)	~~Mirai~~; Teddi; Todd (Note: As part of the Gala Gift twist, Cynthia was selected to have immunity from the first eviction. Additionally, due to the Gala Gift, Todd was selected to become a nominee during the Eviction Ceremony. He chose to take Mirai's place on the block.)	Chris Ka. Mirai	Chris Ki. Cynthia	Miesha; Shanna	Carson; Lamar	Cynthia; Lamar	Cynthia; Todd	Cynthia; Todrick	(None)
Miesha	Head of Household	Mirai	Head of Household	Nominated	Carson	Lamar	Head of Household	Cynthia (Note: As Head of Household, Miesha chose to evict Cynthia.)	Winner
Todrick	Teddi	Mirai	Chris Ki.	Shanna	Carson	Lamar (Note: As the vote was tied, the Head of Household cast the tie-breaker vote.)	Todd	Nominated	Runner-up
Cynthia	Todd	Mirai	Nominated	Shanna	Lamar	Nominated	Nominated	Evicted (Day 29)	Todrick
Todd	Nominated	Mirai	Chris Ki.	Shanna	Head of Household	Cynthia	Nominated	Evicted (Day 27)	Miesha
Lamar	Teddi	Mirai	Chris Ki.	Shanna	Nominated	Nominated	Evicted (Day 27)		Miesha
Carson	Todd	Mirai	Chris Ki.	Head of Household	Nominated	Evicted (Day 24)			Miesha
Shanna	Teddi	Mirai	Chris Ki.	Nominated	Evicted (Day 20)				Miesha
Chris Ki.	Teddi	Head of Household	Nominated	Evicted (Day 17)					Miesha
Chris Ka.	Todd	Nominated	Quit (Day 15)						
Mirai	Teddi	Nominated	Evicted (Day 13)						Miesha
Teddi	Nominated	Evicted (Day 10)							Miesha
Evicted	Teddi; 5 of 8 votes to evict	Mirai; 7 of 7 votes to evict	Chris Ki. 5 of 5 votes to evict	Shanna; 4 of 4 votes to evict	Carson; 2 of 3 votes to evict	Lamar; 2 of 3 votes to evict	Todd; Todrick's choice to evict	Cynthia; Miesha's choice to evict	Miesha; 7 votes to win
Evicted	Teddi; 5 of 8 votes to evict	Mirai; 7 of 7 votes to evict	Chris Ki. 5 of 5 votes to evict	Shanna; 4 of 4 votes to evict	Carson; 2 of 3 votes to evict	Lamar; 2 of 3 votes to evict	Todd; Todrick's choice to evict	Cynthia; Miesha's choice to evict	Todrick; 1 vote to win

== Production ==
=== Development ===
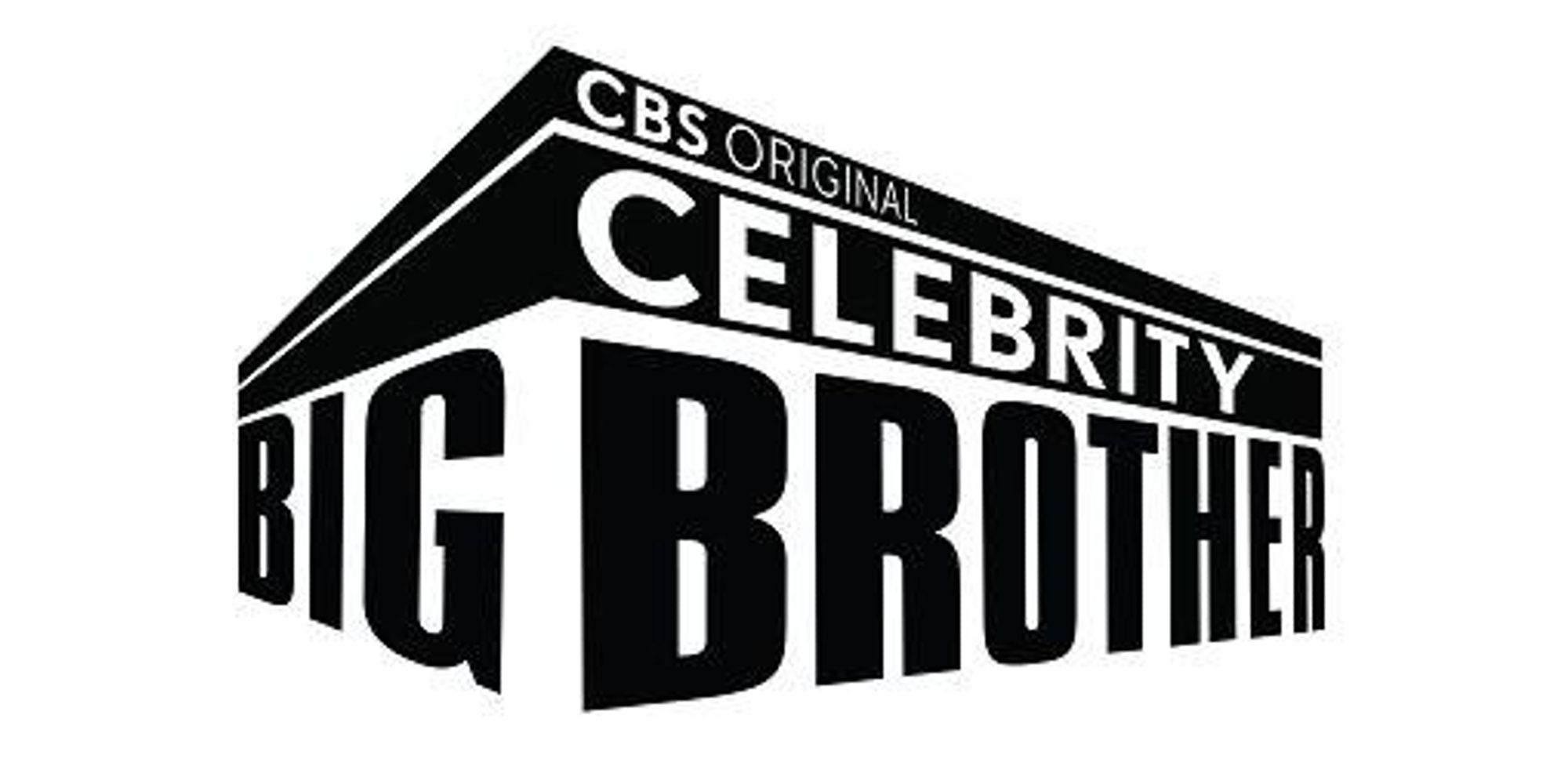
Alternate logo for Celebrity Big Brother used in promotional material designed in the same style as Big Brother: All-Stars and Big Brother 23.

The first season of the American version of Celebrity Big Brother aired on CBS in February of the 2017–18 television season as counterprogramming to NBC's coverage of the 2018 Winter Olympics. Due to the success of the series a second season was later ordered that aired in the second half of the 2018–19 television season. Ahead of the twenty-first season of the civilian version in 2019 CBS Entertainment President Kelly Kahl stated that future editions of Celebrity Big Brother were uncertain. In addition, future contracts of host Julie Chen Moonves did not include any mention of Celebrity Big Brother. In December 2020, following the conclusion of the parent series twenty-second season Chen Moonves mentioned in an interview that she and numerous producers encouraged the network to order a third season, believing that then was the time to do it due to the impact of the COVID-19 pandemic. Chen Moonves stated that they declined to order a third season at the time but continued to leave the possibility open for a later time. On September 9, 2021, during the Television Critics Association summer press tour, Thom Sherman, Senior Executive Vice President of CBS programming, announced that Celebrity Big Brother would return for a third season. Chen Moonves returned as host. Allison Grodner and Rich Meehan returned as executive producers while Fly on the Wall Entertainment and Endemol Shine North Americacontinued to serve as production companies.

=== Casting ===
Compared to previous seasons at least half of the contracted celebrities must be black, indigenous, (and) people of color. The requirement comes from a CBS effort that began in 2020 to bring diversity to reality television series.

=== Filming ===
In August 2021 it was reported that ViacomCBS was looking to sell CBS Studio Center in Studio City, California where the Big Brother house is located. When the season was announced, it was confirmed that the Big Brother house will feature 94 high definition cameras and 113 microphones although the official location of the studio was not mentioned. Filming began on January 26, 2022.

=== Production design ===
The Swiss Alpines-themed entranceway is highlighted with a crystal chandelier. The living room featuring a curved couch and firepit can be seen in the background.

The seasons Ski lodge-themed house design was revealed through the series social media accounts and entertainment news websites on January 28, 2022. The entranceway to the house was designed around the Swiss Alpines and features a crystal chandelier that has three-hundred thousand illuminated beads. A living room houses a mid-century firepit in the center of a curved couch and posters advertising Switzerland landmarks. Three bedrooms were designed around Ski patrol, a Cuckoo clock, and Chocolate. The Ski patrol bedroom has a Saint Bernard sign above a barrel of brandy, walls of stacked river stones, and an accent wall full of skis; the Cuckoo clock room has a wall clock with a nine-foot face, an "imposing wooden cuckoo", and other various time-keeping devices; the chocolate-themed bedroom features Swiss chocolate bar headboards, bubblegum rugs, and walls with LED-lit artificial chocolate. The kitchen houses an overhead mural of the Northern lights and an attached dining room features a Saarinen-inspired table. A spiral staircase that has been featured in the house since the sixth season of the civilian version in 2005, and throughout the first two seasons of the celebrity version, has been replaced with a three-landing staircase. On the second floor, the upstairs lounge was designed around a gondola while the Head of Household bedroom parallels an Ice palace. A sauna and gym have also been added to the house.

=== Prize ===
The last remaining HouseGuest received $250,000. The runner-up received $50,000.

== Twist ==
=== Gala Gift ===
During the first Head of Household competition, Julie told the HouseGuests of the Gala Gift - which would give someone a blessing and someone a curse. This gift took the form of a handbag styled hat designed by the fictitious fashion designer Mon Won (the apparent designer of all of Big Brother's costumes used for punishments).

Before Nominations, the Housemates participated in a Chain of Rejection selection to determine who would receive immunity. Beginning with HoH, Miesha, each HouseGuest would select the next wearer of the Mon Won hat, making them ineligible to receive immunity. The last wearer of the hat would receive Immunity from the first eviction. Cynthia was awarded immunity.

On Eviction Night, a Chain of Safety selection process was held to determine an instant nominee. Beginning with Cynthia, the Mon Won hat would be passed around again among the HouseGuests with each HouseGuest selecting who they wish to be safe. The last wearer of the hat would be instantly nominated for that night's eviction. This nominee would replace their choice of either of the HoH's nominees. Miesha, as HoH, Carson, as the PoV holder and Teddi and Mirai as the original nominees did not participate in this process. Todd became the instant nominee and replaced Mirai.

Below is the full selection order for both selections.

	Immunity Selection	Nomination Selection
1	Miesha	Cynthia
2	Chris Ki.	Shanna
3	Chris Ka.	Chris Ki.
4	Todd	Todrick
5	Teddi	Chris Ka.
6	Lamar	Lamar
7	Carson	Todd
8	Todrick	
9	Mirai	
10	Shanna	
11	Cynthia	

== Broadcast ==
At the time of its announcement it was reported that the season would air in February 2022, during the 2021–22 television season, as counterprogramming to the 2022 Winter Olympics. 24/7 Live feeds and additional exclusive content streamed on Paramount+, previously CBS All Access, throughout the season. It was later announced that the season would premiere on February 2 and air through February 23, 2022.

== Reception ==
=== Critical response ===
Todrick Hall was widely criticized for his comments regarding Shanna Moakler, Chris Kirkpatrick, and other houseguests in the house which were deemed by viewers and critics as mean-spirited. Additionally, Hall received backlash from several former colleagues for his treatment towards them with allegations of employee negligence regarding pay and behavioral issues being mostly criticised.

=== Viewing figures ===
Viewership and ratings per episode of Celebrity Big Brother 3
No.	Title	Air date	Timeslot (ET)	Rating (18–49)	Viewers (millions)	DVR (18–49)	DVR viewers (millions)	Total (18–49)	Total viewers (millions)	Ref.
1	"Episode 1"	February 2, 2022	Wednesday 8:00 p.m.	0.8	3.76	TBD	TBD	TBD	TBD	
2	"Episode 2"	February 3, 2022	Thursday 9:01 p.m.	0.5	2.66	TBD	TBD	TBD	TBD	
3	"Episode 3"	February 4, 2022	Friday 8:00 p.m. (Note: Aired as a special two-hour episode)	0.4	2.33	TBD	TBD	TBD	TBD	
4	"Episode 4"	February 6, 2022	Sunday 8:00 p.m.	0.5	2.61	TBD	TBD	TBD	TBD	
5	"Episode 5"	February 7, 2022	Monday 9:00 p.m.	0.4	2.36	TBD	TBD	TBD	TBD	
6	"Episode 6"	February 9, 2022	Wednesday 8:00 p.m.	0.6	2.92	TBD	TBD	TBD	TBD	
7	"Episode 7"	February 11, 2022	Friday 8:00 p.m.	0.4	2.53	TBD	TBD	TBD	TBD	
8	"Episode 8"	February 13, 2022	Sunday 8:00 p.m.	0.3	1.52	TBD	TBD	TBD	TBD	
9	"Episode 9"	February 14, 2022	Monday 9:00 p.m.	0.4	2.63	TBD	TBD	TBD	TBD	
10	"Episode 10"	February 16, 2022	Wednesday 8:00 p.m.	0.5	3.09	TBD	TBD	TBD	TBD	
11	"Episode 11"	February 18, 2022	Friday 8:00 p.m.	0.5	2.67	TBD	TBD	TBD	TBD	
12	"Episode 12"	February 19, 2022	Saturday 8:00 p.m.	0.3	1.60	TBD	TBD	TBD	TBD	
13	"Episode 13"	February 20, 2022	Sunday 8:00 p.m.	0.5	2.96	TBD	TBD	TBD	TBD	
14	"Episode 14"	February 21, 2022	Monday 9:00 p.m.	0.4	2.45	TBD	TBD	TBD	TBD	
15	"Episode 15"	February 23, 2022	Wednesday 8:00 p.m.	0.7	3.51	TBD	TBD	TBD	TBD	
