= Celebrity Big Brother (American TV series) =

American reality television series

Coordinates: 34°8′40.12″N 118°23′20.71″W

- Also known as: Big Brother: Celebrity Edition; Celebrity Big Brother U.S.
- Genre: Reality television
- Based on: Big Brother by John de Mol Jr.
- Presented by: Julie Chen Moonves
- Starring: Celebrity Big Brother houseguests
- Voices of: Don Wollman
- Narrated by: Clayton Halsey
- Theme music composer: David Vanacore; Ken Berry
- Country of origin: United States
- Original language: English
- No. of seasons: 3
- No. of episodes: 41 (list of episodes)

Production
- Executive producers: Allison Grodner; Rich Meehan; Chris Roach
- Producers: Amy P. Barron; Jordan Kranis; Heath Luman; Don Wallman
- Camera setup: Multi-camera
- Running time: 40–44 minutes
- Production companies: Our House Productions; Fly on the Wall Entertainment; Endemol Shine North America

Original release
- Network: CBS
- Release: February 7, 2018 – February 13, 2019
- Release: February 2 – February 23, 2022

Related
- Companion show; Celebrity Big Brother: After Dark; Parent show; Big Brother (American TV series); Related; International versions

Celebrity Big Brother, also known as Big Brother: Celebrity Edition, is a reality television spin-off series of the American adaptation of Big Brother created by John de Mol Jr. The series began on February 7, 2018, on CBS in the United States and is simulcast in Canada on Global. The series is filmed at CBS Studio Center in sound stage eighteen located in Studio City, Los Angeles. Julie Chen Moonves reprises her role as host from Big Brother with Allison Grodner and Rich Meehan also returning as executive producers. The series is produced by Fly on the Wall Entertainment in association with Endemol Shine North America.

The premise of the series remained largely unchanged from the main edition of Big Brother, in which a group of contestants, known as "HouseGuests," who live in a purpose-built house, known as the Big Brother House, with no contact from the outside world. The contestants compete in competitions for safety and for power over the household before voting each other out in an attempt to be the last HouseGuest remaining and win a grand prize. The difference from the parent series is the inclusion of "Celebrity" HouseGuests (those with notoriety prior to participating in the series), the time frame (a month as opposed to 3 months) and a smaller grand prize ($250,000 as opposed to $750,000)

Each season is also transmitted in real-time which allows for greater viewer participation in the form of America's Vote where the public can give their favorite HouseGuest various prizes ranging from luxury items to advantage to help them survive inside the House. Prior to the live season finale, the viewers are able to vote for their America's Favorite HouseGuest with the winner getting an auxiliary prize of $25,000.

The first overall season of Celebrity Big Brother worldwide premiered in the United Kingdom in 2001 while an American version of the format has been speculated since 2002. The first season of the American adaptation was announced during a live double eviction episode of the nineteenth regular season on September 7, 2017, by Julie Chen Moonves. The first season was scheduled during the February 2018 sweeps period to counterprogram NBC's coverage of the 2018 Winter Olympics. The series premiere was the number one program for CBS attracting 7.27 million viewers and the highest-rated season premiere since Big Brother 13. The program was often covered in the media due to the inclusion of Omarosa Manigault and her political revelations in the first season.

In September 2021, CBS renewed Celebrity Big Brother for a third season, which premiered on February 2, 2022.

In October 2025, CBS cancelled Celebrity Big Brother after three seasons.

== Format ==
The series is a game show in which a group of celebrity contestants, referred to as HouseGuests, live in a custom-built set, known as the Big Brother House, constantly under video surveillance. While in the House, the HouseGuests are completely isolated from the outside world, meaning no phone, television, Internet, magazines, newspaper, or contact with those not in the House. This rule could be broken, however, in the event of a medical injury, a family emergency, or death. The format of the series is mainly seen as a social experiment, and requires HouseGuests to interact with others who may have differing ideals, beliefs, and prejudices. Though locked in the House, the HouseGuests are free to quit the game, though will not be allowed entry back into the game. Should a HouseGuest break the rules of the game, they could be expelled from the House, and unable to return. The HouseGuests compete for a grand prize of $250,000 and the runner-up is awarded $50,000. Prior to the live finale the viewers are able to award their favorite HouseGuest of the season the title America's Favorite HouseGuest with a cash prize of $25,000.

The symbol used for the Power of Veto

Periodically a HouseGuest will be eliminated from the competition, referred to as evicted from the House. At the start of each round, the HouseGuests compete for the title Head of Household. The Head of Household for each round is given luxuries such as their own personal bedroom, items from home and a letter of encouragement from a loved one. The winner of the Head of Household competition is immune from nominations and was instructed to nominate two fellow HouseGuests for eviction. After a HouseGuest became Head of Household he or she is ineligible to take part in the next Head of Household competition except during the final Head of Household competition where everyone is eligible to compete. The Head of Household, the two nominees and three other HouseGuests selected by random draw then compete for the Power of Veto. The winner of the Power of Veto competition wins the right to save one of the nominated HouseGuests from eviction. If the Veto winner exercises the power, the Head of Household then has to nominate another HouseGuest for eviction which at this point nominations become final.

On eviction night all HouseGuests except for the Head of Household and the two nominees votes to evict one of the two nominees. Before the voting began the nominees have the chance to say a final message to their fellow HouseGuests on why they should stay. This compulsory vote is conducted in the privacy of the Diary Room by the host Julie Chen Moonves. In the event of a tie, the Head of Household will break the tie and reveal their vote in front of the other HouseGuests. The nominee with the most votes from the other HouseGuests is evicted from the House and interviewed by Julie Chen Moonves. Unlike other versions of Big Brother, the HouseGuests can discuss the nomination and eviction process open and freely.

The evicted HouseGuests of the season form the Jury that votes for the winner out of the final two HouseGuests remaining in the House on the season finale, they are known as the jury members. The production team may introduce a temporary change to the format at any time known as a twist. The HouseGuests are informed of a twist by the host or by a note given to the Head of Household to read aloud to the other HouseGuests from the production team. During the show the production team is referred to as Big Brother by the HouseGuests.

=== Differences from Big Brother ===
Some aspects of the format used for Big Brother was modified or changed for the celebrity edition. Due to the condensed nature of the program evictions happen at a quicker rate with multiple evictions occurring each week. The celebrity jury members are not sequestered after their eviction and are able to catch-up on the show before voting for a winner depending on when they were evicted. In contrast jury members from the main series are sequestered in a separate house and are not allowed to watch the show except for segments that included all of the HouseGuests. They are not shown any Diary Room interviews or any footage that included strategy or details regarding nominations.

The live finale features the most changes when compared to the live finales from Big Brother. Five HouseGuests remained inside the House by the season finale instead of the regular three HouseGuests. Live finales of Big Brother feature a three-part final Head of Household competition with the final eviction of the season in order to reduce the number of contestants inside the House down to two. The live finale for the celebrity season was re-tooled to feature the conclusion of the final 5 round (including a pre-recorded Power of Veto competition and live eviction) then the final Head of Household competition is played in one part where the Final Head of Household wins the power to evict two HouseGuests in order to reduce the number of contestants inside the House down to two.

== Series overview ==
Season	Episodes	Originally released		Days	HouseGuests	Winner	Runner-up	Final vote	Average viewers (millions)
Season	Episodes	First released	Last released	Days	HouseGuests	Winner	Runner-up	Final vote	Average viewers (millions)
1	13	February 7, 2018	February 25, 2018	26	11	Marissa Jaret Winokur	Ross Mathews	6–3	5.04
2	13	January 21, 2019	February 13, 2019	29	12	Tamar Braxton	Ricky Williams	9–0	4.40
3	15	February 2, 2022	February 23, 2022	29	11	Miesha Tate	Todrick Hall	7–1	2.63

== Production ==
=== Background ===
After the first season of the British version of Big Brother proved to be a success in the ratings for Channel 4, the network collaborated with the BBC for the first British season of Celebrity Big Brother in aid of Comic Relief. The season ran for a condensed run of eight days and featured six British celebrities moving into the house used for the first British season. Due to the success of the first celebrity edition, a second season was ordered and shown exclusively on Channel 4 in November 2002. The celebrity version took a two-year break before returning for its third season in 2005 and became a regular staple alongside the regular British version. Starting with the third season, the show began to feature celebrities outside the United Kingdom alongside well-known British celebrities. Many notable American celebrities have since taken part in the British version of Celebrity Big Brother. American actor Gary Busey took part in the fourteenth season in the summer of 2014 and became the first American celebrity to win Celebrity Big Brother in the United Kingdom.

=== Development ===
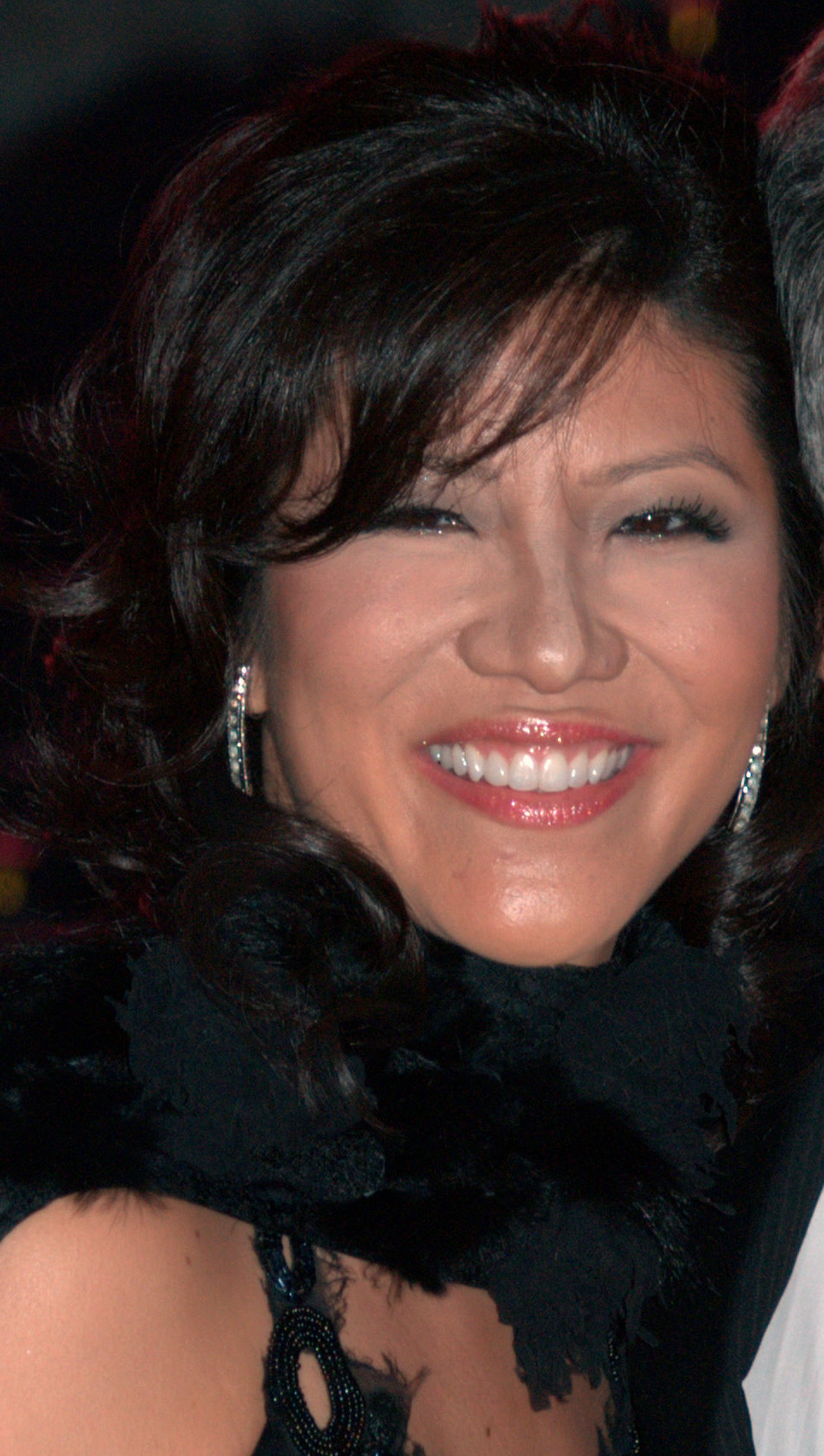
Julie Chen Moonves has hosted the series since its premiere.

An American version of Celebrity Big Brother has been speculated since 2002, along with a celebrity version of Survivor. In an interview, Julie Chen and then CEO of CBS Corporation Leslie Moonves revealed talks of a celebrity edition of Big Brother as far back as Big Brother 2. It was rumored that CBS was looking to air a celebrity edition in the fall after Big Brother 3 with radio personality Howard Stern speculated as a possible Houseguest. Chen revealed that Paris Hilton had agreed to do it and Roseanne Barr initially agreed to take part, but then backed out. Barr would later take part in another celebrity spin-off of Big Brother called Big Brother: Celebrity Hijack in the United Kingdom in 2008, where she watched over a group of non-celebrity housemates for a day, set tasks and talked to them in the Diary Room. Julie Chen announced on September 7, 2017, during a live double eviction episode of Big Brother 19 that Celebrity Big Brother would air sometime during the winter, before the twentieth season of Big Brother in the summer of 2018.

=== Cast and crew ===
CBS confirmed that Chen would reprise her role as host for the celebrity edition with executive producers Allison Grodner and Rich Meehan returning. CBS also confirmed that the celebrity edition would be produced by Fly on the Wall Entertainment in association with Endemol Shine North America. In an interview Chen revealed that her husband Les Moonves forced her to take a pay cut for Celebrity Big Brother due to it being a condensed version. Chen returned as the host for the second season now being credited as Julie Chen Moonves.

Don Wollman and Clayton Halsey also reprises their roles as a co-executive producer and editor respectively. Wollman also serves as the voice of Big Brother where he pre-records a series of statements that are played over the loud speakers inside the House. These range from asking HouseGuests to come to the Diary Room or reminding them they are not allowed to talk about production and their Diary Room sessions with other HouseGuests. Occasionally Wollman will make announcements to the HouseGuests that are not pre-recorded. Wollman's voice is primarily heard on the live Internet feeds while occasionally heard on the episodes. (Note: Wollman's voice is unaccredited during the broadcast episodes. He discusses the role at length during a pre-season interview for Big Brother 18. Wollman's voice can be heard on the third episode of season eighteen of Big Brother calling multiple HouseGuests to the Diary Room. His voice is also heard in the third episode of the first season of Celebrity Big Brother calling HouseGuests to the Diary Room.) Halsey also serves as the narrator for the opening and closings of the broadcast episodes. In this role he recaps recent events that were aired in previous episodes during the opening while explaining what events will take place in future episodes during the closing.

=== Casting ===
Deena Katz serves as the casting director for the series she also is known for casting ABC's Dancing with the Stars. Grodner revealed she spoke with the producers of the British adaptation about their experiences with celebrities. Due to the American adaptation featuring more competitions than other formats there is no special treatment for the celebrities in order for the competitions "to be as fair as possible". Tamar Braxton won the second season and became the first ever African-American HouseGuest to win in the history of the American adaptation of Big Brother. In an effort to promote diversity, CBS announced a new rule for Big Brother that 50% of all contestants must be a person of color or an indigenous person for the 2021–2022 broadcast season.^{[18]}

=== Production design and music ===
Celebrity Big Brother uses a similar title sequence and logo that was introduced with the sixteenth season of Big Brother that was designed by Charlie Co. The logo was slightly modified to remove the water effects which were replaced by faint lights while the word "Celebrity" before "Big" with "Brother" underneath. The water effect that was used as a transition and appears around the HouseGuests was removed. This was replaced with a star being used as the transition and items related to the celebrities notoriety appeared around them. The series also uses the same theme song as Big Brother during the opening title sequence which was composed by David Vanacore and Ken Berry.

=== Filming ===
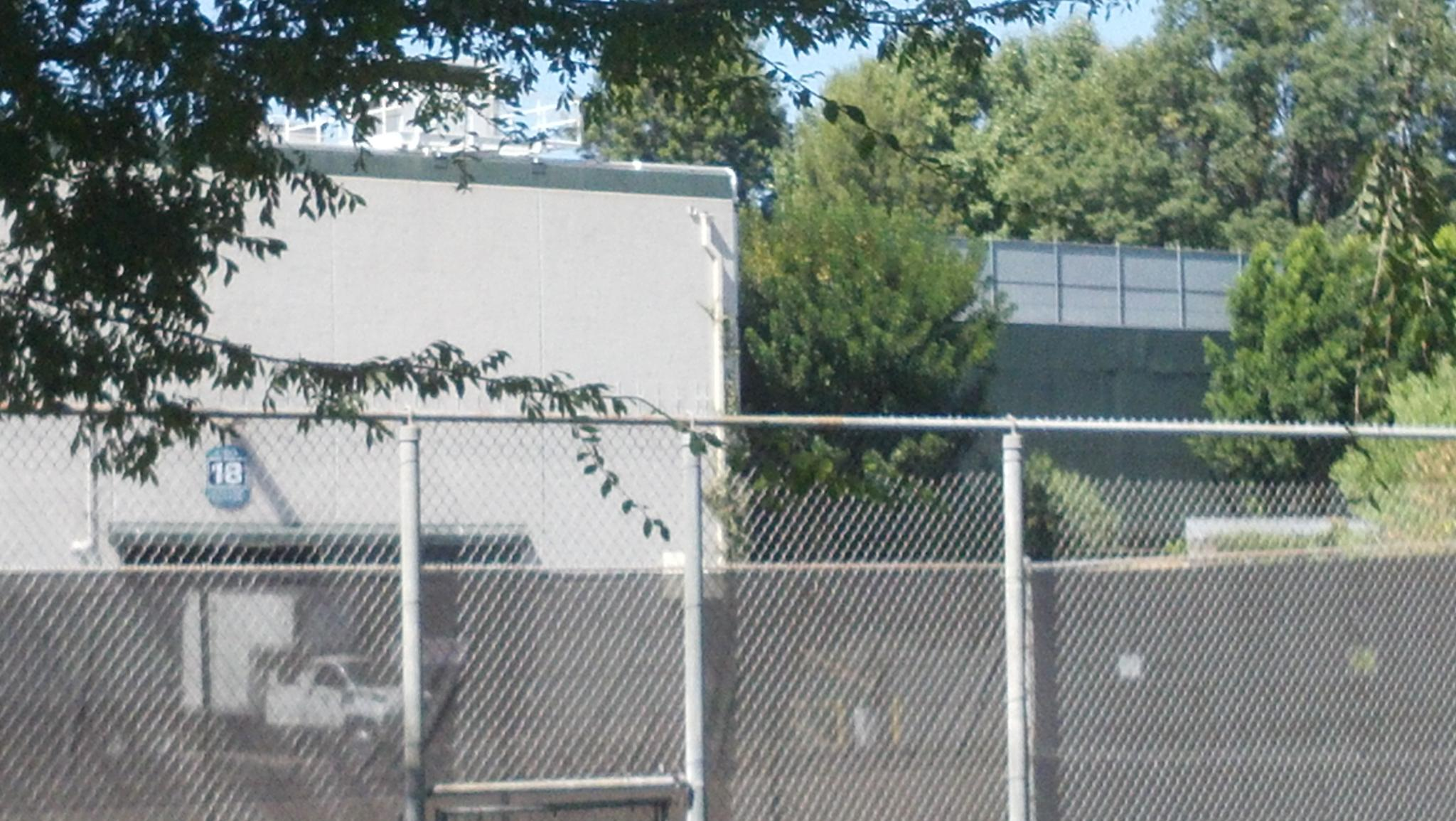
A view of CBS Studio Center sound stage 18, where the house is located

Filming for the series takes place at CBS Studio Center, sound stage eighteen where the sitcom Yes, Dear was filmed. Celebrity Big Brother is filmed in the same location as Big Brother since its sixth season and is referred to as the Big Brother House often shortened to House. The House has 94 high-definition cameras and over 113 microphones in order to monitor and record the HouseGuests. The first floor of the House consists of three bedrooms, storage room and the Diary Room which is accessible by the living room. The bathroom, a lounge room, backyard and a spiral staircase going to the second floor are accessed via the kitchen. The front door is located in a vestibule area that separates the living room and kitchen. The Head of Household bedroom and en suite bathroom is located on the second floor. The second floor also has a balcony with an additional lounge area where the HouseGuests can look down and see the first floor. The backyard is significantly smaller due to the majority of the backyard being used for constant competitions. During Celebrity Big Brother a roof is installed over the backyard. The pool table was brought inside from the backyard and moved to the upstairs lounge area. The spare room sometimes used for tasks on the civilian Big Brother series, such as the Den of Temptation in season nineteen, is turned into an indoor gym for the celebrity edition.

=== Future ===
After the success of the first season CBS ordered a second season to air during the winter of the 2018–19 television season on May 12, 2018. The network reconfirmed the news four days later when the network revealed its 2018–19 fall prime-time schedule. After the departure of Les Moonves from CBS Corporation on September 9, 2018, because of multiple sexual misconduct allegations, the media speculated that Julie Chen Moonves might not continue hosting Celebrity Big Brother and Big Brother. CBS later confirmed on November 27, 2018 that Chen Moonves would host the second season of the series.

Celebrity Big Brother was not mentioned when CBS announced their plans for the 2019–20 television season on May 15, 2019. Kelly Kahl, president of entertainment at CBS, revealed on May 21, 2019 that a third season of the celebrity spin-off is still uncertain. On September 5, 2019 the parent series Big Brother was renewed for a twenty-second season with Chen Moonves signing a new contract to return as host. However the new contract for Chen Moonves did not include a future season of Celebrity Big Brother with CBS not announcing anything official regarding the series. On November 11, 2019, CBS announced their 2020 winter schedule, which did not include Celebrity Big Brother. On December 28, 2020, Chen Moonves revealed that shortly after the conclusion of the twenty-second season of the civilian version of Big Brother that she and numerous producers pushed CBS to order a third season of Celebrity Big Brother but that they declined to order one at the time leaving the option open to still order a third season at a later date.

A third season of Celebrity Big Brother was officially announced on September 9, 2021, for Winter 2022 with Julie Chen Moonves returning as host.

== Broadcast and coverage ==
The main television coverage of Celebrity Big Brother is screened on CBS over thirteen episodes per season. Alongside these episode Pop shows live coverage from inside the House on Celebrity Big Brother: After Dark. CBS also makes available live Internet video feeds from the House available through Paramount+ (formerly CBS All Access during the first two seasons). In order to preserve the drama for television broadcasts, CBS does not webcast certain moments that transpire in the house, including competitions and the nomination/eviction process. Slanderous statements and singing of copyrighted music are also blocked for legal reasons. Celebrity Big Brother introduced "Big Brother Bot" which is available through Facebook, Kik and Skype. The bot was renamed to "Big BroBot" when the first season launched, it allows viewers to participate in quizzes and polls, ask the bot Big Brother related questions, get highlights about what happens inside the House and cast votes that can affect the game. The show also maintains social media accounts on Facebook and Twitter. The series is also simulcast in Canada on Global. The first season was also screened in Australia on 9Go! for the first time in the history of American Big Brother under the title Celebrity Big Brother U.S.. Episodes were broadcast on a delay but were uploaded to the streaming service 9Now shortly after the American airing of the show.

== Reception ==
The first season of Celebrity Big Brother was often reported on by various media outlets for the inclusion of Omarosa Manigault and her discussions about her time in the Trump administration. Reed Gaudens of Fansided reviewed the series premiere positively noting the series "could either be so bad it’s good or just plain bad. Thankfully, it’s the former" while saying of the HouseGuests "weren’t exactly the famous faces we anticipated" for the season. Andy Dehnart of Reality Blurred was more critical of the show noting that most of the season one Houseguests were previously on other reality shows like Dancing with the Stars and The Celebrity Apprentice. In a post season review he noted the first season had been a "delight" when compared to a season of Big Brother.

=== Ratings ===
Celebrity Big Brother had a strong series premiere with the highest ratings since the premiere of Big Brother 13 on July 7, 2011. The series debuted to 7.27 million viewers with a 1.8/7 rating in the 18-49 demographic. The remainder of the first season was scheduled as counterprogramming to NBC's coverage of the 2018 Winter Olympics. The first season finale aired on February 25, 2018 with 5.2 million viewers with a 1.4/5 rating in the 18-49 demographic coming in second behind the closing ceremony for the Olympics. The first season averaged 5.04 million viewers per episode.

The second season premiere was down compared to the first season with 5.36 million viewers with a 1.4/6 in the 18-49 demographic. The eighth episode of the second season pulled in the lowest ratings of the season with 3.28 million viewers. The finale for the second season was watched by 3.87 million viewers which was below season average levels for the program. The second season averaged a total of 4.40 million viewers.

==== Nielsen ratings ====
Viewership and ratings per season of Celebrity Big Brother
Season	Timeslot (ET)	Episodes	First aired		Last aired		TV season	Avg. viewers (millions)	18–49 rank	Avg. 18–49 rating
Season	Timeslot (ET)	Episodes	Date	Viewers (millions)	Date	Viewers (millions)	TV season	Avg. viewers (millions)	18–49 rank	Avg. 18–49 rating
1	Wednesday 8 p.m. Thursday 8 p.m. (2); Friday 8 p.m. Saturday 8 p.m. (12); Sunday 8 p.m. Monday 8 p.m.	13	February 7, 2018	7.27	February 25, 2018	5.21	2017–18	5.04	TBD	1.25
2	Monday 8 p.m. (1, 6); Monday 9 p.m. (9, 12); Tuesday 8 p.m. (2); Wednesday 8 p.m. (3, 7); Wednesday 9 p.m. (13); Thursday 8 p.m. (10); Friday 8 p.m. Saturday 8 p.m. (12); Sunday 8 p.m.	13	January 21, 2019	5.36	February 13, 2019	3.87	2018–19	4.40	TBD	1.05
3	Wednesday 8 p.m. Thursday 9 p.m. (2); Friday 8 p.m. Sunday 8 p.m. Monday 9 p.m. Saturday 8 p.m. (12)	15	February 2, 2022	3.76	February 23, 2022	3.51	2021–22	TBD	TBD	TBD
