= Battle of the Ex Besties =

Reality television series

- Genre: Reality competition
- Country of origin: United States
- Original language: English
- No. of seasons: 1
- No. of episodes: 8

Production
- Executive producers: Haylee Vance; Rick de Oliveira; Beth Greenwald; Michael Dietz; Patrick Agans
- Producers: Ronn Head; Shana Kemp
- Editor: Folmer Wiesinger

Original release
- Network: Oxygen
- Release: February 14 – April 4, 2017

Battle of the Ex Besties is a reality competition show that premiered on Oxygen on February 14, 2017. Filmed in late 2016, the series featured 7 pairs of former best friends competing together to win a $100,000 prize. The cast included former Bad Girls Club cast members Danni Victor and Judi JaI.

== Contestants ==
Contestants	Team Name	Outcome
Katy & Christy	KChris	1st
Melissa & Trevor	Trelissa	2nd
Deandra & Tiaramy	Tiandra	3rd
Jasmine & Lauren	Jasren	4th
Ashonti & Melanie	Ashanie	5th
Erika & Jenny	Jenika	6th
Danni & Judi	Dandi	7th

== Weekly progress ==
Contestants	Episodes							
Contestants	1	2	3 (Note: In Episodes 3, 4 and 6 only the winning team and the bottom 2 teams were revealed)	4	5	6	7 (Note: In Episode 7, since Deandra & Tiaramy and Katy & Chrissy never finished last in a challenge, they did not have to compete in that week's challenge and automatically advanced to the finals)	8
Katy & Christy	1st	2nd	1st	N/A	1st	2nd	Safe	1st
Melissa & Trevor	5th	5th	N/A	2nd	6th	N/A	1st	2nd
Deandra & Tiaramy	3rd	3rd	5th	5th	4th	1st	Safe	3rd
Jasmine & Lauren	4th	4th	N/A	6th	3rd	5th	2nd	4th
Ashonti & Melanie	6th	1st	6th	1st	2nd	N/A	3rd	
Erika & Jenny	2nd	6th	N/A	N/A	5th	6th		
Danni & Judi	7th	7th						

Table key
The team won the final competition
The team lost the final competition
The team won first place in that week's challenge
The team did not have to compete that week's challenge
The team was in danger of being eliminated
The team was eliminated from the competition
The team was originally eliminated, but was saved

== Episodes ==
No.	Title	Original release date	U.S. viewers (millions)
1	"Ex-Bestie Baggage"	February 14, 2017	N/A
2	"Worst. Night. Ever."	February 21, 2017	0.16
3	"Survival of the Fittest"	February 28, 2017	0.15
4	"Run for Your Money"	March 7, 2020	N/A
5	"K-Town Run Around"	March 14, 2017	0.16
6	"What a Beach"	March 21, 2017	0.15
7	"Muddy Buddies"	March 28, 2017	0.16
8	"Roll of a Lifetime"	April 4, 2017	0.14
