= Counterprogramming (television) =

Television programming marketing strategy

In broadcast programming, counterprogramming is the practice of offering television programs to attract an audience from another television station or cable channel airing a major event. It is also referred when programmers offer something different from the rival's program as an alternative to increase the audience size.

== United States ==
=== Super Bowl ===
The Super Bowl, being among the most watched television events in the United States, became a notable target of counterprogramming during the early 1990s due to its previous halftime shows; which critics felt were dated and not representative of modern pop culture. During Super Bowl XXVI, Fox aired a live, football-themed episode of In Living Color against the halftime show, which featured football-themed sketches and an on-screen countdown clock to the start of the second half. The special was sponsored by Frito-Lay, who also announced the winner of a $1 million giveaway during the special. The special drew 22 million viewers, and Nielsen estimated that CBS lost 10 ratings points during halftime as a result.

The success of the In Living Color special caused the National Football League to make changes to raise interest and viewership of the halftime show by inviting major pop music artists to perform, beginning with Michael Jackson at Super Bowl XXVII. This pattern continued until 2005, following an incident at Super Bowl XXXVIII's halftime show where Justin Timberlake exposed one of Janet Jackson's breasts, leading to a string of halftime shows with a single, headlining classic rock act (such as the Rolling Stones, Prince, and Bruce Springsteen) in an effort to prevent a repeat of the "wardrobe malfunction" (since Super Bowl XLV, the NFL has returned to inviting pop artists to play halftime). Despite Michael Jackson's performance helping to increase interest in subsequent halftime shows, Fox's success inspired imitators, and influenced other specials such as Animal Planet's annual Puppy Bowl (featuring dogs playing in a model football stadium), and the Lingerie Bowl, a series of pay-per-view broadcasts of all-female football games played in lingerie, proving popular enough to be spun off into its own Lingerie Football League.

Under an unsaid gentlemen's agreement, all four major networks (including CBS, Fox, NBC, and ESPN/ABC, who also alternate airing the Super Bowl on a yearly cycle) will typically not schedule any new programming (nor air counterprogramming) on the night of the Super Bowl. NFL Network suspends programming while the game is in progress, carrying a static screen with the game's radio broadcast and a live scoreboard under the branding Super Bowl Game Center. Fox provided an exception in 2010, when it aired two new episodes of 'Til Death against Super Bowl XLIV; however, the network had been in the process of burning off the low-rated sitcom in unusual timeslots (including a marathon of four new episodes on Christmas Day) so Sony Pictures Television would have enough episodes to syndicate it.

As to preempt the possibility that the 2022 Winter Olympics would counterprogram the game, and to maximize advertising sales opportunities, CBS agreed to swap Super Bowl LVI, which, for the first time, was scheduled during an ongoing Olympic Games, to NBC for Super Bowl LV, so that both events were aired by the same network. Furthermore, the structure of the rotation under the NFL's next round of television contracts (which expands it to all four major networks) deliberately gave NBC the Super Bowl games in subsequent Winter Olympic (2026, 2030, and 2034) years.

During Super Bowl LX in 2026, conservative non-profit organization Turning Point USA counterprogrammed the halftime show (which featured Puerto Rican artist Bad Bunny) with the "All-American Halftime Show", headlined by Kid Rock, Lee Brice, Brantley Gilbert, and Gabby Barrett.

=== Professional wrestling ===
One of the earliest prominent examples of counterprogramming in professional wrestling occurred in 1987, when the World Wrestling Federation (WWF, now WWE) scheduled its new pay-per-view (PPV) Survivor Series on Thanksgiving evening, airing against Jim Crockett Promotions's (JCP) Starrcade, which was their flagship annual event. WWF owner Vince McMahon made carriage of the following year's WrestleMania IV contingent on carrying Survivor Series; as a result, few cable companies elected to carry Starrcade. WWF would also air the first Royal Rumble event in January 1988, on the cable channel USA Network against JCP's Bunkhouse Stampede PPV; Crockett would retaliate by scheduling the first Clash of the Champions on TBS against WrestleMania IV. The squabbling diluted the profits of the promotions and cable companies alike, leading to JCP's near-bankruptcy and eventual purchase by TBS owner Ted Turner, who reformed JCP into World Championship Wrestling (WCW). Due to the intervention of cable companies, WWF and WCW were not permitted to schedule major shows against each other. The only exception was when WCW scheduled Clash of the Champions VI: Ragin' Cajun against WrestleMania V in April 1989, at the direct behest of the cable companies, who were locked in a dispute with McMahon regarding carriage fees; after the dispute was resolved, the cable companies allowed WCW to run Clash of the Champions on cable television.

In 1995, WCW began to schedule a live, weekly show on TNT, Monday Nitro, to compete directly with the WWF's then recently-launched Monday Night Raw on USA Network, resulting in an intense rivalry dubbed the "Monday Night War". Aided by WCW's popular New World Order (nWo) stable featuring Hulk Hogan (who had joined WCW in 1994 after leaving the WWF), Nitro regularly beat Raw in viewership for 84 consecutive weeks. In 1997, the WWF began to shift its programming in a mature direction dubbed the "Attitude Era" to compete with WCW. By April 1998, bolstered by the popularity of performers such as Stone Cold Steve Austin, and Austin's in-universe feuds with McMahon, Raw began to overtake Nitro in viewership for the first time since 1996.

As Raw only aired live on occasion at the time, WCW commentators occasionally discussed Raw spoilers on-air as a ploy to discourage viewers from tuning away. This tactic infamously backfired during the January 4, 1999, episode of Nitro, when a spoiler that Mick Foley (who previously performed for WCW as Cactus Jack, and was performing in the WWF as Mankind) would win the WWF Championship had the opposite effect, causing Nitro to lose around 600,000 viewers to the final hour of Raw. The Nitro main event (featuring Hulk Hogan defeating Kevin Nash for the WCW World Heavyweight Championship) was also marred by its unusual build-up and controversial finish, dubbed the "Fingerpoke of Doom". The episode's events were retrospectively considered to be one of several missteps that led towards WCW's dissolution, and the sale of its assets to WWF.

For eight weeks beginning January 4, 2010, competing promotion TNA briefly moved its weekly program Impact! on Spike to Monday nights, airing directly against Raw. The move was also bolstered by TNA's hiring of Hulk Hogan and Eric Bischoff, who had both been with WCW at its peak. In response, WWE staged the return of Bret Hart, his first WWE appearance in over 12 years. TNA lost two thirds of its audience during this time, before TNA returned to Thursday, with president Dixie Carter saying: "Our fans made it clear that they preferred the Thursday night time period. By moving to Thursdays, this is a win/win opportunity for both TNA and the fans. We are looking forward to delivering what the fans are asking for."

A renewed wrestling rivalry between TNT and USA dubbed the "Wednesday Night Wars" emerged in 2019, between WWE and the new promotion All Elite Wrestling (AEW), which has been seen as the first major promotion since WCW to compete financially with WWE. TNT began to air AEW's first weekly program, Dynamite, on Wednesday nights beginning on October 2, 2019. On August 2, WWE announced that it would expand WWE NXT (a WWE Network program that focuses on a developmental brand of the same name) to a two-hour format on USA Network beginning the same night; the expansion soft-launched on September 18 with only the first hour airing on USA, to accommodate the final episodes of Suits' final season. The decision was seen as a move to counterprogram the upstart AEW, and also came alongside USA losing WWE's second flagship program SmackDown to Fox the same month. Both AEW and NXT held two-week events on their July 1 and 8, 2020 episodes, with AEW holding Fyter Fest (which had originally been planned as a PPV), and NXT holding The Great American Bash (a former pay-per-view brand originating from WCW).

With Dynamite continuing to outperform NXT in key demographic viewership, WWE and USA eventually conceded and moved NXT to Tuesday nights beginning on April 13, 2021, with NBCUniversal executive Frances Berwick citing the past ratings performance of WWE programs on Tuesday nights. TheWrap speculated that the change may have also been intended to free up a time slot on USA Network for Wednesday Night Hockey due to the upcoming closure of NBCSN, provided that NBC Sports renewed its rights to the NHL beyond the 2020–21 season. The media rights would instead be acquired by TNT and ESPN, with Dynamite moved to TBS in January 2022 to accommodate TNT's Wednesday-night games.

Since 2021, Dynamite would only air against WWE's television shows if either promotion was pre-empted by other events, most notably by TBS coverage of the Major League Baseball postseason pre-empting Dynamite to a Tuesday airing in 2023 and 2024, and the 2024 presidential election pre-empting that week's NXT to Wednesday. WWE and AEW's television shows would directly compete in other circumstances, such as an extended edition of WWE's SmackDown (which itself had been pre-empted from Fox to FS1 due to Fox's own MLB postseason coverage) airing with AEW's Rampage in October 2021, or AEW's Collision sometimes airing with WWE PPVs on Saturday evenings.

WWE would also occasionally counterprogram AEW's PPVs; WWE's scheduling of the Clash at the Castle and Worlds Collide events in 2022 on Labor Day weekend, against AEW's All Out, led to an expletive-laden tirade from AEW owner Tony Khan that "he had a lot more fucking money than Jim Crockett did" and that he would not "sit back and take this shit" going forward. WWE scheduling a house show in the same city and on the same night as AEW's Worlds End in December 2024 led to a change in AEW's strategy of event promotion in 2025. The conflict intensified in 2025, when WWE scheduled its periodic NBC special Saturday Night's Main Event and the NXT Battleground event in Tampa on Memorial Day weekend against AEW's Double or Nothing in Glendale, and scheduling both the NXT special The Great American Bash and Saturday Night's Main Event on July 12 against AEW's All In: Texas (which had been given a special 3 p.m. ET start time). In response, Khan described WWE's strategy in 2025 as "the most consistent head-to-head scheduling since Jim Crockett Promotions", but again vowed that the conflict would end differently.

=== Academy Awards ===
In 2007, the NASCAR Sprint Cup Series' Auto Club 500 at Auto Club Speedway in Fontana, California, was held on the same day as the 79th Academy Awards, although it was held during the early afternoon with a 1 p.m. PT (4 p.m. ET) start. The 2008 Auto Club 500 was plagued by rain delays and unintentionally aired against a portion of the 80th Academy Awards; its start time was delayed to around 3 p.m. PT (6 p.m. ET), while the race itself was halted again at around 6 p.m. PT (9 p.m. ET). In 2009, the race was intentionally scheduled with a 3 p.m. PT start, which would overlap into the telecast of the 81st Academy Awards. Fox Sports' senior vice president of programming and research Bill Wanger supported the idea, believing that NASCAR races "[could] hold their own against any competition", arguing that the Oscars and the race appealed primarily to female and male audiences respectively. For the 2010 season, the race was moved to a noon PT (3 p.m. ET) start due to NASCAR adopting standardized start times for all races that season.

For a number of years, the championship game of the NCAA Division I men's basketball tournament aired on the day of the Academy Awards ceremony, leading into primetime. During the 48th Academy Awards in 1976, presenter Elliott Gould acknowledged the game during the ceremony after hearing it on a radio backstage, interjecting his co-presenter Isabelle Adjani by jokingly announcing that the winner for Best Film Editing was "Indiana, 86–68". By the time CBS started broadcasting the NCAA Final Four, the Academy Awards ceremony had been moved to be held the week before the Final Four, and has since moved further into mid or late February (except during Winter Olympic years) due to ABC's decision to have the awards held during the February sweeps period, along with the general consolidation of the film awards season into a shorter period.

The 2012 NBA All-Star Game was played opposite the 84th Academy Awards. The presentation drew an estimated 39.3 million viewers, a 4% increase over the previous year. Conversely, viewership for the All Star Game on TNT measured at 7.1 million, a 22% decline from the previous year's 9.1 million.

The Alliance of American Football scheduled one of its contests opposite the 91st Academy Awards in 2019. The game drew 515,000 viewers, a bump of approximately 20% from the previous week's and following week's matchup on the same network, NFL Network.

=== Other ===
When Seattle's KCPQ relaunched on November 4, 1980, it aired the film The Deer Hunter to counter the major networks' coverage of the 1980 presidential election.

NBC, the long-time broadcaster of the Macy's 4th of July Fireworks in New York City, has historically aired an encore presentation of the special at 10 p.m. ET/PT, immediately following its live broadcast. The Boston Pops Orchestra's own concert and fireworks special on CBS aired live at the same time as the NBC encore. While NBC claimed that this was for budgetary reasons, Boston Pops executive producer David G. Mugar believed that NBC had done so to intentionally have the Boston Pops lose viewers. After ratings fell by 1 million viewers for 2012, CBS ended its national broadcasts of the event in 2013; the concert was still aired in full, as before, by its Boston station WBZ-TV. The national broadcast was revived on CBS for 2016 with an expanded two-hour format, before moving to Bloomberg Television in 2017, due to Bloomberg entering a sponsorship to the event.

On the day of Donald Trump's first inauguration as president of the United States, Comedy Central broadcast an all-day marathon of the 20th season of South Park, which had featured an ongoing storyline where Mr. Garrison is elected president in a parody of Trump and his campaign.

During the 2018 Winter Olympics, which were broadcast by NBC, other networks generally placed their main lineups of scripted programming on hiatus, barring The CW for selected series. However, the networks continued to air most of their unscripted reality programs as an alternative, with ABC airing The Bachelor and Shark Tank, and CBS airing The Amazing Race. ABC and CBS also scheduled spin-offs of their other signature reality franchises to specifically compete against the Olympics, including The Bachelor Winter Games (which featured alumni of the franchise competing in winter sports challenges to receive dates), and the first American season of Celebrity Big Brother, which aired its season finale against the closing ceremony. CBS would order a second season of Celebrity Big Brother to air in 2019, followed by a third in 2022 to air against the 2022 Winter Olympics. ABC had planned another Bachelor spin-off, The Bachelor Summer Games, to similarly air in August 2020 during the 2020 Summer Olympics, but production was cancelled due to the COVID-19 pandemic. During the 2026 Winter Olympics, CBS scheduled reruns of Survivor on weeknights from February 9 to 20, airing a selection of episodes highlighting contestants from the then-upcoming 50th season.

In June 2024, after his presidential campaign failed to meet the criteria to participate, Robert F. Kennedy Jr. counterprogrammed the CNN-hosted presidential debate between Joe Biden and Donald Trump with a campaign event from Los Angeles on Rumble and X dubbed "The Real Debate", in which he provided his own answers to the questions posed during the debate, as moderated by John Stossel using the same format and time limits.

== Brazil ==
In the late 1980s, the Brazilian upstart network SBT faced counterprogramming efforts from perennial leader Rede Globo on several occasions, prompting SBT to engage in changes to its own schedule to avert them. After acquiring the rights to the American miniseries The Thorn Birds, SBT elected to schedule its airings after Globo's highly rated telenovela Roque Santeiro to avoid counterprogramming; when promoting The Thorn Birds on his variety show, SBT owner and personality Silvio Santos emphasized that viewers would be able to tune in for both. After the premiere successfully attracted viewers away from Globo, the network moved to give Santeiro and its newscast Jornal Nacional irregular running times, so that Santeiro would intentionally overrun into The Thorn Birds' timeslot. To avert this counterprogramming attempt, SBT added cartoons to its schedule as filler so that The Thorn Birds would get a slightly later start time.

Later, after Globo scheduled an airing of Rambo: First Blood Part II on the same night that SBT had planned to air First Blood, SBT pre-empted Rambo to the following week, only for Globo to counterprogram it with back-to-back episodes of its novela Vale Tudo. In response, SBT pre-empted Rambo to air after Vale Tudo, and aired a static slide announcing the schedule change for 50 minutes against the soap.

In 2001, Globo attempted to counterprogram the season finale of SBT's reality show Casa dos Artistas with heavily-promoted features on its long-running news magazine Fantástico—including a preview of the season finale for its own reality show No Limite (which itself was postponed to avoid counterprogramming Casa). Globo lost in the ratings to SBT, which peaked with a network record of 55 ratings points.

== United Kingdom ==
In the United Kingdom, Ofcom can punish broadcasters who deliberately counterprogram another broadcaster for the intent of damaging the other broadcaster's ratings. In 2000, the coincidental scheduling of the first million-pound winner on ITV's Who Wants to Be a Millionaire? opposite the final episode of One Foot in the Grave on BBC One drew accusations of counterprogramming; the Independent Television Commission (ITC), after investigating the matter, exonerated ITV of any wrongdoing.

By contrast in 2005, attempts by ITV to counterprogram the BBC's revival of Doctor Who with the poorly-received game show Celebrity Wrestling were unsuccessful, with ITV burning it off in a lower-profile Sunday timeslot after five episodes.

Since 1993, Channel 4 has traditionally counterprogrammed the royal Christmas message with an "alternative Christmas message" delivered by a notable non-royal figure, including entertainers (including Danny Dyer, Adam Hills, and Sharon Osbourne), fictional characters (including Ali G, Marge Simpson, and a satirical deepfake of Elizabeth II), and political figures (such as Jesse Jackson, Edward Snowden, and then-president of Iran Mahmoud Ahmadinejad).
