= Jared Lee =

American artist and illustrator

- Born: Jared D. Lee; August 19, 1943 (age 82); Van Buren, Indiana, U.S.
- Occupation: Humorous illustrator
- Years active: 1970 – present
- Spouse: Pamela Jerdon Lee (PJ)
- Children: 2 Daughters (Jana, Jennifer)

Signature
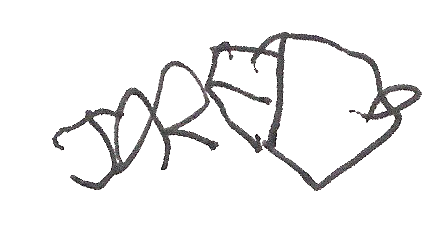

Jared D. Lee (born August 19, 1943) is an artist and humorous illustrator.

== Biography ==
Jared Devon Lee was born in Van Buren, Indiana on August 19, 1943. He received a Bachelor of Fine Arts degree in 1966 from The John Herron Art Institute located in Indianapolis, Indiana. He served two years in the military from 1966 to 1968 in Ft Hood, Texas. His art career started at Gibson Greetings in 1969, located in Cincinnati, Ohio, where he designed humorous greeting cards. He launched out as a freelance Illustrator in 1970 creating Jared Lee Studio.

His work has been associated with Scholastic Publishing, Simon and Schuster, Dutton Children's Books, US Postal Service, New York Telephone, Bell South, L.L. Bean, Procter and Gamble, Ralston Purina, Lands' End, and Hasbro, to name a few. He was one of the six illustrators chosen to create the first group of Happy Meal boxes for McDonald's.

Jared Lee has illustrated nearly 200 children's books. The best-selling books have been done with authors Lucille Colandro, 'There Was An Old Lady' and Mike Thaler, 'The Black Lagoon' series. In the past, Jared also created a humorous line of equestrian products including t-shirts, coffee mugs, note pads, and stuffed horses that sold in over 1200 stores throughout the United States and abroad.

He currently lives with his wife Pamela Jerdon Lee, 'PJ' who also shares in a passion for art, loves oil painting, and lives with Jared Lee on a small ranch in Ohio.

== Honors and awards ==
He has received awards from the Society of Illustrators, The Martha Kinney Cooper Ohioana Library Association, The National Cartoonist Society, and numerous advertising clubs. In 2011 Lee was nominated for a National Cartoonists Society award for book illustration.

Memberships include the Society of Illustrators, and Illustrators' Partnership.
