= Allison Grodner =

American director, producer and writer

- Occupations: Director; Producer; Writer
- Years active: 2000-present
- Known for: Big Brother; Big Brother: Over the Top; Celebrity Big Brother

Allison Grodner is an American director, producer and writer, who has worked in documentary and reality-based programming. She is best known for her work on the American version of the reality TV show Big Brother. She is an executive producer of Big Brother and Big Brother: After Dark. Grodner is also executive producer of She's Got the Look on TV Land, You're Cut Off! on VH1, reality series Plain Jane and Remodeled on The CW, and Battle of the Ex Besties on Oxygen.

Grodner won Emmy Awards in 1999 and 2001 for Outstanding Children's Program for The Teen Files, shared with Arnold Shapiro.

In 2009, Grodner was a founding partner of Fly on the Wall Entertainment, the production company for Big Brother, Celebrity Big Brother, Flip or Flop Atlanta, and Million Dollar Mile.
