= The Princess Diaries, Volume IV and 1/2: Project Princess =

2003 young adult novel by Meg Cabot

The Princess Diaries Volume IV and 1/2: Project Princess
- First edition cover
- Author: Meg Cabot
- Language: English
- Series: The Princess Diaries
- Genre: Young adult novel
- Publisher: HarperTrophy
- Publication date: 2003
- Publication place: United States
- Media type: Print (Paperback)
- Pages: 64 pp (first edition, paperback)
- ISBN: 0-06-057131-4 (first edition, paperback)
- OCLC: 52030701
- LC Class: PZ7.C11165 Pv 2003
- Preceded by: The Princess Diaries, Volume IV: Princess in Waiting
- Followed by: The Princess Diaries, Volume V: Princess in Pink

The Princess Diaries, Volume IV and 1/2: Project Princess is a young adult novel in the Princess Diaries series. Written by Meg Cabot, it was released in 2003 by HarperCollins Publishers and is the first novella in the series.

== Plot summary ==
Mia Thermopolis and her friends Lilly Moscovitz, her brother Michael Moscovitz, Boris, and her teacher, Mrs. Martinez, go to West Virginia to help out the less fortunate. For three days, they volunteer with Helping the Homeless to build a house. They leave Manhattan for West Virginia with the supplies to go camping. Mia is not interested in the project, but Michael is going to volunteer with the group. At the end of the novel, a host family received the new house, and Grand-mère arrived at the end of the three days to bring the group back to Manhattan.
