= The Princess Diaries =

Series of young adult novels by Meg Cabot

- Cover of the first release of the then-complete series omnibus published by HarperCollins
- Main novels: The Princess Diaries (2000); Princess in the Spotlight (2001); Princess in Love (2002); Princess in Waiting (2003); Princess in Pink (2004); Princess in Training (2005); Party Princess (2006); Princess on the Brink (2006); Princess Mia (2007); Forever Princess (2009); Royal Wedding (2015); The Quarantine Princess Diaries (2023); Novellas: Project Princess (2003); The Princess Present (2004); Sweet Sixteen Princess (2006); Valentine Princess (2006); Companion novels: Princess Lessons (2003); Perfect Princess (2004); Holiday Princess (2005); Ransom My Heart (2009); Graphic novels: The Princess Diaries: The Graphic Novel (2026)
- Author: Meg Cabot
- Illustrator: Chelsey McLaren, Bethany Crandall
- Country: United States
- Language: English
- Genre: Young adult fiction
- Publisher: HarperTrophy
- Published: May 30, 2000 – March 7, 2023
- Media type: Print (paperback & hardcover); Audiobook; E-book
- No. of books: 20
- Followed by: From the Notebooks of a Middle School Princess
- Website: https://megcabot.com/series/princess-diaries/

The Princess Diaries is a series of epistolary young adult novels written by Meg Cabot, and is also the title of the first volume, published in 2000. The series consists of 12 core novels, 4 novellas, and 4 companion novels. The series follows normal-American-teen-turned-royal Mia Thermopolis through her "diary" entries. The series originally concluded in 2009 with the tenth volume, but was revived in 2015 and 2023 with Royal Wedding and The Quarantine Princess Diaries, respectively. A spin-off series for younger audiences was launched in 2015, which follows Mia's younger half-sister, Olivia.

== Premise ==
The series revolves around Amelia "Mia" Thermopolis, a teenager in New York City who discovers that she is the princess of a small European principality called Genovia. The series follows Mia's life throughout high school in the 2000s and juggling regular teenage life with being a royal princess. The books are noted for containing many pop culture references from the 2000s that influence some of the plot.

Cabot quotes the series' inspiration on her website stating: "I was inspired to write The Princess Diaries when my mom, after the death of my father, began dating one of my teachers; they later went on to get married just as Mia's mom does in the book! I have always had a 'thing' for princesses (my parents used to joke that when I was smaller, I did a lot of insisting that my 'real' parents, the king and queen, were going to come get me soon, and that everyone had better start being a lot nicer to me) so I stuck a princess in the book just for kicks... and voilà! The Princess Diaries was born."

Real-life figures that Cabot is speculated to have drawn inspiration from include Princess Charlotte, Duchess of Valentinois (1898–1977), the illegitimate daughter of Louis II, Prince of Monaco who was later legitimized as his legal heiress and Jazmin Grace Grimaldi (1992–present), the illegitimate daughter of Albert II, Prince of Monaco, born and living in the United States. The fictional country the royal family belongs to shares geographical and cultural similarities with the Republic of Genoa, a historical republic.

Genovia
- 'The Princess Diaries' location
- Flag of Genovia
- Created by: Meg Cabot
- Genre: Young adult fiction

In-universe information
- Other name: Principality of Genovia
- Type: Constitutional monarchy
- Ruled by: Princess Mia (princess regent, currently); Princess Clarisse Renaldi (princess dowager); Prince Artur Christoff Phillipe Gerard (abdicated)
- Locations: Pyrus (capital); New Pyrus (largest city)
- Population: 64,486
- Motto: The whole body works
- Anthem: Genovia, the land I call my home
- Language(s): English and French
- Currency: Genoves (LKM)
- Demonym: Genovian

== Characters ==
=== Primary characters ===
- Mia Thermopolis: Describes herself as a five-foot nine, flat chested, freshman, freak; also known as Amelia Mignonette Grimaldi Thermopolis Renaldo, Princess of Genovia. Mia loves to write, has a tendency to obsess over everything that happens to her, is a vegetarian, identifies as a feminist and is currently failing algebra and many other subjects.
- Grandmere: Mia's grandmother, who loves Sidecars, is highly critical of everyone around her. She has a hairless poodle, Rommel, and she calls Michael Moscovitz that boy. Her full name is The Dowager Princess Clarisse Renaldo. Mia and her Grandmother don't get along with each other for most of the story.
- Lilly Moscovitz: Mia's bossy activist best friend, who has her own television cable show, Lilly Tells It Like It Is.
- Michael Moscovitz: Lilly's older brother, who is extremely smart and according to Mia, is attractive. Also Mia's crush.
- Philippe Renaldo: Mia's royal father, who is the prince of Genovia. He had Mia out of wedlock, and is constantly annoyed by his domineering mother, has many girlfriends, and tells Mia that she is a princess after he is no longer able to have children because he had cancer.
- Tina Hakim-Baba: A girl whom Mia befriends throughout the novel. Her father is an oil man sheikh who is worried that she will get kidnapped. She originally is shunned because her overprotective father forces her to have a bodyguard (Wahim), but she and Mia quickly become close.
- Frank Gianini: Mia's algebra and homeroom teacher and he dates her mother, Helen. Mia grows to appreciate his after-school algebra review sessions, and though their relationship begins awkwardly, Mia and Mr. G seem to get along well.
- Lars: Mia's bodyguard. He follows her almost everywhere and lives in the Plaza. Has some serious blackmail on Mia, having followed her around everywhere.
- Fat Louie: Mia's very fat cat who is attracted to anything shiny.

==== Amelia "Mia" Mignonette Grimaldi Thermopolis Renaldo, Princess of Genovia ====
Mia Thermopolis is the protagonist of the series. She is the teenage daughter of Helen Thermopolis, a painter, and Philippe Renaldo, the crown prince of Genovia. Mia learns she is the heir apparent of Genovia while she is a student at the fictional Albert Einstein High School in Manhattan.

Mia is sometimes shy and has a down-to-earth personality, though on occasion she shows herself to be quite sarcastic and sly. Throughout the series, she is very critical of herself, describing herself as flat-chested, taller than most girls at 5-foot-9, and having embarrassingly large feet. She also has a tendency to over-analyze and worry.

In the film series, some of Mia's external characteristics and life details are altered, but much of her core personality remains. She is portrayed by Anne Hathaway. Her last name was changed to Renaldi for the films.

==== Clarisse Mignonette Grimaldi Renaldo, Dowager Princess of Genovia ====
Clarisse is the dowager princess of Genovia and Mia's paternal grandmother. Mia refers to her as "Grand-mère" (French for "Grandmother"). As a young woman, she married Prince Rupert Renaldo and had one son. She speaks French most of the time, but she can also speak English; however, she disdains English as a vulgar language. She is almost always accompanied by her miniature poodle, Rommel, who is notable for having a severe case of OCD that causes him to lick his own fur off. She smokes often and enjoys drinking sidecars. She is not above lying or manipulating others in order to get her own way.

In the film series, Clarisse is portrayed by Julie Andrews and is characterized as more proper.

==== Lilly Moscovitz ====
Mia's best friend since kindergarten, Lilly is a highly intelligent and opinionated person who has her own public-access television show, titled Lilly Tells It Like It Is, in which she discusses political and social issues. By the end of the series, her TV show is picked up by a network and is apparently very popular in South Korea. Lilly is not considered to be very pretty; Mia often describes her face as being "squashed in like a pug's". However, she has a well-developed figure.

In the film series, Lilly is portrayed by Heather Matarazzo. She is characterized as brash, rebellious, and socially conscious. Her talk show is called "Shut Up and Listen". In the second installment she is a student at Berkeley.

==== Michael Moscovitz ====
Lilly's older brother, and Mia's main love interest throughout the series. Michael is tall and has brown eyes and thick, dark hair. Mia insists that he is the third best-looking guy at AEHS after Josh Richter and Justin Baxendale and describes his nose as aquiline, mouth as "eminently kissable", and neck as aromatic due to an intoxicating blend of Tide from his shirt collar, his Gillette shaving foam, and Ivory soap. Though he often clashes with his younger sister, Michael and Lilly are in fact close siblings and friends. He used to run his own webzine, Crackhead, but had to disband it after an editorial stating the merits of Linux over Windows, which caused a loss of advertisers and funds. Shortly after this, Michael starts a band called Skinner Box (a name suggested by Mia) with a few friends, including Boris Pelkowski.

In the 2001 film, Michael is portrayed by Robert Schwartzman. While he is the main love interest in this film, they agree to just be friends and break up before the events of the 2004 sequel and he does not appear.

=== Secondary characters ===
- Lars van der Hooten: Mia's very protective Swedish bodyguard. In the films, his counterpart is stern-but-lovable head of security and driver Joe, portrayed by Héctor Elizondo.
- Helen Thermopolis: Mia's mother. She has a career as an artist and spends most of her time in her studio. In the films she is portrayed by Caroline Goodall.
- Frank Gianini: Mia's algebra and homeroom teacher. He dates her mother, Helen, and marries her when she becomes pregnant with Mia's half-brother, Rocky. His film counterpart is English teacher Patrick O'Connell, portrayed by Sean O'Bryan.
- Artur Christoff Phillipe Gerard Grimaldi Renaldo, Prince of Genovia: Mia's father and Clarisse's son. He had a brief tryst with Helen in college resulting in Mia's conception. He initially keeps Mia's royal status a secret from her, but learns due to testicular cancer he cannot have any more children, leaving Mia the heir. He does not appear directly in the film series as he passes prior to the events of the first film, but is heard through narration by René Auberjonois and portrayed in photos by Gerald Hathaway.
- Tina Hakim Baba: Mia's classmate and the daughter of a Saudi Arabian oil sheik and a British ex-supermodel. She has her own bodyguard, Wahim. Mia and Tina bond over their shared experience in isolation from their peers.
- John Paul "J.P." Reynolds Abernathy IV: Initially known as "The Guy Who Hates It When They Put Corn In the Chili", J.P. is a classmate who meets Mia through Grand-mère's school musical in Party Princess, eventually becoming her friend. J.P. and Mia date after Michael leaves for Japan, but break up after Mia finds out J.P. was using her.
- Boris Pelkowski: A Russian violin virtuoso, and Lilly's boyfriend. His habits include tucking his sweater into his pants, breathing through his mouth, and playing the violin in Gifted and Talented class, when everyone else wants him to be quiet.
- Lana Weinberger: A popular junior cheerleader with long blonde hair, a peaches-and-cream complexion, baby blue eyes and a voluptuous figure. She is a main antagonist of the first film, in which her last name is Thomas and she is portrayed by Mandy Moore.
- Josh Richter: Lana Weinberger's boyfriend. He is on the crew team and is co-valedictorian. In the first film, he is Josh Bryant, popular student and Mia's crush, portrayed by Erik Von Detten.

== Books in series ==
#	Title	Publication Date	Publisher	Alternate Title	Illustrator	Notes
1	The Princess Diaries	September 1, 2000	HarperTrophy			
	The Princess Diaries: The Graphic Novel	April 7, 2026	HarperAlley		Bethany Crandall	Full-color graphic novel adaptation of The Princess Diaries
2	The Princess Diaries, Volume II: Princess in the Spotlight	June 1, 2001	HarperTrophy	Take Two		
3	The Princess Diaries, Volume III: Princess in Love	March 1, 2002	HarperTrophy	Third Time Lucky		
4	The Princess Diaries, Volume IV: Princess in Waiting	March 1, 2003	HarperTrophy	Mia Goes Fourth		
	Princess Lessons	March 1, 2003	HarperCollins	Princess Diaries Guide to Life	Chelsey McLaren	Companion novel
4½	The Princess Diaries, Volume IV and a Half: Project Princess	July 22, 2003	HarperTrophy	Secret Princess		Novella
	Perfect Princess	March 23, 2004	HarperCollins	The Princess Files	Chelsey McLaren	Companion novel
5	The Princess Diaries, Volume V: Princess in Pink	March 1, 2004	HarperTrophy	Give Me Five		
6	The Princess Diaries, Volume VI: Princess in Training	March 1, 2005	HarperTrophy	Sixsational		
6½	The Princess Diaries, Volume VI and a Half: The Princess Present	October 2005	HarperTrophy	Mia's Christmas		Novella
	Holiday Princess	October 2005	HarperCollins	Princess Diaries Guide to Christmas	Chelsey McLaren	Companion novel
7	The Princess Diaries, Volume VII: Party Princess	March 1, 2006	HarperTrophy	Seventh Heaven		
7½	The Princess Diaries, Volume VII and a Half: Sweet Sixteen Princess	May 2006	HarperTrophy	The Princess Diaries Yearbook		Novella
7¾	The Princess Diaries, Volume VII and ¾: Valentine Princess	December 2006	HarperTrophy	The Princess Diaries in Love		Novella
8	The Princess Diaries, Volume VIII: Princess on the Brink	December 1, 2006	HarperTrophy	After Eight		
9	The Princess Diaries, Volume IX: Princess Mia	December 1, 2007	HarperTrophy	To the Nines		
10	The Princess Diaries, Volume X: Forever Princess	January 1, 2009	HarperTrophy	Ten Out of Ten		
11	The Princess Diaries, Volume XI: Royal Wedding	June 2, 2015	William Morrow Paperbacks			
12	The Quarantine Princess Diaries	March 7, 2023	Avon Impulse			

On January 1, 2009, Ransom My Heart was published under William Morrow Paperbacks. The book is written by Cabot, but authorship is credited as "Princess of Genovia Mia Thermopolis with help from Meg Cabot." In-universe, the book is Mia's senior project, and does not include the characters or continue the plot of The Princess Diaries. The novel follows a headstrong huntress who kidnaps a knight for ransom, only to fall in love when he is revealed as a lord.

== Plot ==
The series is set primarily in the Manhattan borough of New York City. Some books take place in Genovia, a fictional European country. Genovia is a principality between France and Italy ruled by Mia's father, Prince Philippe Renaldo, and by Mia's grandmother, Dowager Princess Clarisse Renaldo.

Geographically, Genovia is situated on the Mediterranean Sea, and backs against the rugged snowcapped mountainous terrain of the Alps. The slopes of the mountains are home to mostly olive trees. Genovia's economy is built around its popularity as a tourist destination, and its export of high end olive oil (and later orange juice). The country features the only naturally white sand beaches along the Riviera. Though, tourism took a down turn after cruise ships were banned from docking in the bay.

The fictional history of Genovia is revealed throughout the series, as its national dynamics are explored. Genovia's history can be traced back to 568 AD, when Visigothic warlord Albion killed the King of Italy and placed himself on the throne. He then decided to marry Rosagunde, the daughter of one of the old king's generals. Albion forced his new wife to drink wine from skull of her deceased father. She got revenge on Albion, on the night of their wedding she strangled him with her own braids while he slept. After Albion's death, the old King of Italy's son took over. Grateful to Rosagunde, the king made her the princess of the area later known as Genovia. Rosagunde implemented a sophisticated system of governmental checks and balances, and did away entirely with the death penalty.

In 1907, first-cousin marriages were outlawed in Genovia.

In 1939, Genovia was invaded by Mussolini's forces, and the Dowager's husband historically pledged to exercise the rights of sovereignty in accordance to the political and economic interests of neighboring France in exchange for military and naval protection in the event of war. Prince Rupert led Genovians in arms against the Nazis. For three years, while Rupert fought internationally, Clarisse held the Nazis, and Mussolini at bay from invading the country. Mortars were lobbed at the palace, and Tanks were used to try and cross the moat.

For the wedding of Prince Rupert to Clarisse, Mia's grandmother had a fever of 102°, but still stood through the two-hour wedding ceremony, followed by riding in an open coach through the streets of Genovia. At the wedding reception, prosciutto and melon were served, the crowd waltzed until four in the morning.

Prince Philippe managed to work around his father's agreement, resulting in a nation with the highest literacy rate in Europe, some of the best educational attainment rates, and the lowest infant mortality, inflation, and unemployment rates in the Western Hemisphere. Genovia does not have an Air force or Navy, but it does have a National Guard.

=== Volume I: The Princess Diaries ===
Volume I: The Princess Diaries

Mia Thermopolis is an average urban ninth grader living in Greenwich Village with her single, liberal, and semi-famous painter mother, Helen Thermopolis. She begins keeping a journal after her mother begins dating her Algebra teacher, Mr. Gianni, whose subject Mia is currently failing. Mia has a crush on Josh Richter, the boyfriend of popular cheerleader Lana Weinberger, who often makes fun of her, though she also unknowingly harbours feelings for Michael, the brother of her best friend Lilly Moscovitz.

Mia's father, Philippe Renaldo, who has recently recovered from testicular cancer, pays a visit. He reveals to Mia that he is the prince of Genovia, a small European principality. As he is no longer able to have children, Mia is now his sole heir to the throne and the princess of Genovia.

Mia refuses to move to Genovia so she and her father form a compromise; she will remain in New York with her mother during term-time but spend her holidays in Genovia and attend daily princess lessons with her formidable grandmother, the Dowager Princess Clarisse Renaldo. After Clarisse gives Mia a makeover, Lilly reacts negatively, causing Mia to befriend Tina Hakim Baba, the daughter of a Saudi Arabia oil sheik who is shunned at school due to the presence of her bodyguard.

Mia at first hides the truth of her royal status from her peers at school; however her secret is revealed after her grandmother sells the truth to the press, after which Philippe insists on her being accompanied by a bodyguard, Lars. Josh Richter breaks up with Lana and asks Mia to the Cultural Diversity Dance. Mia grows disillusioned with Josh during their date and realises he is only using her for the publicity after he deliberately kisses her in front of the paparazzi. After Mia confronts him, Lilly apologises to Mia and she and Tina encourage Mia to enjoy the rest of the dance with her friends, including Michael. Mr. Gianni informs Mia that she has managed to bring her Algebra grade up from an F to a D and Mia realises her feelings for Michael.

=== Volume II: Princess in the Spotlight ===
In the second novel of Princess Diaries, Mia must learn to deal with attention from reporters and the public, beginning with a primetime interview that Grand-mère instructs Mia to attend, despite Mia's protests. When Mia gets sick, she thinks that the interview will be cancelled, but she is enticed out of her sickbed by the notion of a "secret admirer," and cannot avoid the interview.

During the interview itself, Mia says a number of embarrassing things, including that her mother is pregnant with the baby of her boyfriend, Mr. Gianini (who is also Mia's algebra teacher). With the pregnancy revealed, Mia's mother asks Mr. Gianini to marry her. Grandmère organizes for the Royal Genovian Event Planner to be flown to New York from Genovia to plan an elaborate, elitist wedding. Mia has to deal with the unwanted attention brought on by the interview, along with the knowledge that a secret admirer has been sending her emails under the name of JoCrox.

On the day of the wedding, Mia discovers that her mom and Mr. Gianini have eloped in Mexico with the help of her father. Mia herself manages to escape the wedding extravaganza in her bridesmaid gown to attend the Halloween screening of The Rocky Horror Picture Show with her friends, where she discovers that her secret admirer is her biology partner Kenny Showalter. Mia is disappointed, as she has been hoping that it would be Michael, her own crush, and Lilly's (her best friend's) older brother.

The book ends with Mia philosophically reflecting that what doesn't kill us makes us stronger, and that she cannot hurt Kenny's feelings and accepts a date with him.

=== Volume III: Princess in Love ===
In this volume, Mia struggles to decide how to break up with her boyfriend Kenny. In The Princess Diaries, Volume II: Princess in the Spotlight Kenny, Mia's biology partner at school, sent anonymous love letters to Mia expressing his feelings for her, resulting in Mia and Kenny dating. Mia does not love Kenny, but cannot bring herself to break up with him. Mia likes Michael, her friend Lilly's older brother, and feels she is leading Kenny on.

Mia also struggles to support Lilly, who organises a school-wide walkout of class as a protest against authority after her English teacher shoots down her paper proposal for her English final, titled "How to Survive High School". Not wanting to upset Mr. Gianini, Mia pulls the fire alarm at the time the walkout is scheduled to happen, though nobody finds out it was her. After Grand-mère and Sebastino, Mia's dress designer, publish a set of photos of Mia modelling different gowns without her or her parents' consent, Mia organises a press conference donating all the proceeds from the sales of the dresses she modelled to Greenpeace.

Mia begins to send Michael anonymous love letters, similar to that of Kenny's. Unknown to her, Mia's friend Tina, whom Mia confided in about the letters, has told Lilly about said letters. Lilly eventually tells Michael that it was Mia sending the letters. At the school Winter Carnival, Michael shows her a message on his computer revealing he knows she sent the love letters, and he returns her feelings.

Mia, not knowing how to respond and thinking Michael may be playing a joke on her, runs from her chair. Mia runs into Kenny, who mistakenly believes Mia is in love with Boris, and they break up. Mia returns home, is devastated and does not want to go to the dance following the carnival, and decides to move to Genovia. Mia's grandmother convinces her to go to the dance, where Mia sees Michael, and they share their first kiss together.

=== Volume IV: Princess in Waiting ===
Now having made her debut as the country's heir presumptive, Mia Thermopolis spends her winter break in Genovia, performing her royal duties at functions of state with her father, grandmother and Prince Rene, a royal descendant of a now non-existent principality. She remains in touch with her friends Tina, Lilly and Michael, who confirmed his reciprocated feelings for Mia in the previous book, but begins to second guess their relationship status.

After a conversation with Tina, who tells Mia not to be too forthright with her feelings due to her own boyfriend Dave reacting badly, Mia searches for a gift for Michael's birthday. Grandmere, who disapproves of Mia's relationship with Michael, advises Mia to play hard-to-get and tries to set her up repeatedly with Rene. On her return to New York, Mia's mother cautions her that distancing herself from Michael will only damage their relationship, which is proven correct when Dave dumps Tina for giving him the silent treatment.

Despite Michael asserting their romantic relationship, Mia's insecurities are fuelled by her seeming to have no special talent, unlike the rest of her peers in Gifted and Talented. Lilly assures Mia she has a talent but refuses to tell her what it is.

When Mia is forced to cancel her and Michael's first movie date due to having to attend a black-and-white ball hosted by a rival of Grandmere's, she convinces herself that Michael is going to dump her. Mia leaves the ball early and finds Michael has instead arranged the movie date for them at his house. He assures Mia he is not considering dumping her and helps her realise she has a talent in writing. Mia finally gives Michael his late birthday present; a rock from the moon collected by Neil Armstrong gifted to Genovia by Richard Nixon, which she smuggled from the Genovian palace.

=== Volume IV and 1/2: Project Princess ===
Mia Thermopolis and her friends Lilly Moscovitz, her brother Michael Moscovitz, Boris, and her teacher, Mrs. Martinez, go to West Virginia to help out the less fortunate. For three days, they volunteer with Helping the Homeless to build a house. They leave Manhattan for West Virginia with the supplies to go camping. Mia is not interested in the project, but Michael is going to volunteer with the group. At the end of the novel, a host family received the new house, and Grand-mère arrived at the end of the three days to bring the group back to Manhattan.

=== Volume V: Princess in Pink ===
Volume V: Princess in Pink

In this installment, Mia Thermopolis frets over whether or not her boyfriend, Michael Moskowitz, will take her to prom. While she initially expects an invitation given that they're happily in love after the events of the previous novel, Mia learns during her birthday party that Michael isn't interested in going to prom at all.

At her birthday dinner that same night, a busboy named Jangbu spills a meal on Grandmère's suit at and she has him fired on the spot. This leads to a citywide busboy protest, with Mia's best friend Lilly aligning herself with the busboys. Much to her ex-boyfriend Boris's chagrin, Lilly also shows romantic interest in Jangbu. To prove his love for Lilly, Boris says he'll drop a globe on his head if she doesn't take him back. Lilly refuses him, and he accidentally does so, injuring himself. After Mia and Lilly's friend Tina Hakim-Baba comforts him, she begins dating Boris.

When the prom is canceled due to the busboy strike, Grandmère pulls strings to secure a new venue and gives Mia an idea to convince Michael of how to come to prom: to get his band to play there. In exchange for providing the premises, Mia successfully blackmails Lana Weinberger into letting Michael's band play at the prom. Helen goes into labour and delivers her and Mr Gianni's baby, a boy named Rocky; Jangbu accepts an exclusive deal with a newspaper and returns to his native country, leaving Lilly dismayed; and the strike ends with improved pay for the busboys.

=== Volume VI: Princess in Training ===
Volume VI: Princess in Training

The book begins with the first day of Mia Thermopolis's sophomore year at the fictional Albert Einstein High School after spending the summer in Genovia. Michael Mocovitz, Mia's boyfriend, is now a freshman at Columbia University and Lilly Moscovitz, Mia's best friend, is still getting over her depression after the end of her relationship with violin prodigy Boris Pelkowski, who is not only still dating Tina Hakim Baba, but has also gotten unexpectedly hot over the summer break.

As the first English lesson of the year begins, Mia, Lilly and Tina pass notes saying how great they think their new English teacher, Ms. Martinez, is. However, when Ms. Martinez grades one of her essays harshly, Mia turns against her. Everything is going well until lunchtime, when Lana Weinberger, Mia's arch-enemy, tells Mia that college boys expect their girlfriends to "do it" with them. This freaks Mia out because she is positive that she is not ready to sleep with anyone. Lilly wants Mia her to run for student counsel president and nominates her to run against Lana.

A stressful school week ends and Mia visits Michael's dorm on Saturday (after a big sleepover at the Plaza with Lily, Tina, Ling Su Wong, and Shameeka Taylor, where Mia stayed up until three o'clock and was woken early because Lilly forced her to go to a soccer game to promote her campaign) and meets his roommate, Doo Pak, where she discovers condoms in Michael's bathroom. Shocked by this discovery, Mia has The Talk with Michael, who says he knows Mia isn't ready because she invited her friends for a sleepover once she found out she had a hotel room to herself, and not him. Michael tells her he understands, but is not going to wait forever and Mia begins to think that Michael is going to break up with her. Lilly reveals that she doesn't actually want Mia to be student counsel president and wants her to immediately resign in favor of Lilly if she is elected.

Mia debates against Lana (a debate which is also televised), and provides a much more convincing argument than Lana and gets the majority of the vote. Mia realizes that she wants to be president herself, when Michael shows up at school and Mia leaves with him. Michael assures Mia he does not want to break up with her, nor for her to have sex before she is ready and the two agree to wait for three months before taking the issue further.

=== Volume VII: Party Princess ===
When Mia Thermopolis bankrupts the student government buying high-tech recycling bins, she needs to raise $5,000 soon, so that she can pay for the seniors' commencement ceremony. All her friends (including her long-time boyfriend and so-called love of her life Michael Moscovitz) mention selling candles, but Mia absolutely refuses, so Grand-mère comes up with a solution: a musical, Braid! written and directed by Grand-mère, starring Mia and her friends, portraying the achievements of Mia's famous Genovian ancestor, Rosagunde. Mia is thrilled, yet quite worried to be cast as the lead. She attempts to drop out, but Grand-mère threatens to tell the seniors that Mia had bankrupted the student government (making them angry that she had not saved money for the commencement ceremony). Braid! also results in a new-found friendship between Mia and "The Guy Who Hates It When They Put Corn In The Chili", aka J.P. - Mia's on-stage love interest, who turns out to be an aspiring screenwriter.

Michael mentions his parents are going away for the weekend and he plans on having a party. Mia starts to worry she isn't enough of a party girl. She even (as a last resort, of course) asks her archenemy, Lana Weinberger, how to act like a "Party Girl". Mia does what Lana says and it all ends in tragedy. After she drinks and "sexy dances" with J.P., her relationship with Michael seems to be on rocky ground, especially as Michael's parents are splitting up and he is being an absent boyfriend. Her friendship with J.P. seems to be going the same way thanks to Lilly's new literary magazine, "Fat Louie's Pink Butthole", which includes "No More Corn!" a story Mia wrote (before meeting him) about J.P. killing himself. However, Principal Gupta immediately bans the magazine and confiscates all the copies, as Lilly has submitted five explicit stories to it, meaning that J.P. never sees Mia's story.

Mia's friendship with Lilly also hits a rough patch after Mia kisses J.P. (on the cheek) as a sign of gratitude for being a supportive friend and Lilly (who clearly has a crush on J.P.) stops speaking to Mia.

The play is performed at the Aide de Ferme, a benefit for Genovian olive oil farmers that Grand-mère puts on. Everyone who is anyone attends, but, before the last scene, Mia is worried about her on-stage kiss with J.P. Then Michael shows up in J.P.'s costume and gives her a perfect kiss and they talk about their problems, and, once again, their relationship appears to be strong. Grand-mère also raises enough money to help the Genovian farmers and Mia, solving her problems.

=== Volume VII and 3/4: Valentine Princess ===
Volume VII and 3/4: Valentine Princess

Mia Thermopolis continues with her diary entries, and this time it's after the fourth novel, Princess in Waiting. Mia Thermopolis has no one to spend Valentine's Day with. Her boyfriend, Michael Moscovitz, isn't interested in Valentine's Day. Lilly Moscovitz, her best friend, suggests that Valentine's Day is a commercialized holiday for corporate interests. Eventually, Tina Hakim Baba suggests that the entire group should watch romantic movies at her house. Her mother and her algebra teacher, Mr. Gianni, are planning to spend Valentine's Day at a romantic restaurant. Mia has to consider a Valentine's Day gift for Michael, and she decided to give him a coupon booklet. Lilly received a heart shaped diamond necklace from Boris. Although Mia thought she would be alone for Valentine's Day, she finds out that she is not alone...

=== Volume VIII: Princess on the Brink ===
Mia Thermopolis, now a junior in high school, is navigating yet another chaotic year. She is no longer student body president, but her responsibilities—and drama—have only increased. She struggles through precalculus while grappling with Lilly’s renewed push to nominate her for school president again. Mia’s world goes topsy-turvy when Michael announces he’s leaving for Japan for an extended period. All the academic stress seems small in comparison to planning a separation that threatens to upend her relationship.

When Grand-mère suggests an unconventional way to convince Michael to stay, Mia steps into uncharted emotional territory. Further turmoil strikes when she discovers Michael may have been unfaithful before their relationship began—leaving her heartbroken. In a moment of vulnerability, Mia kisses J.P., sending ripple effects through her friendships, especially with Lilly. The semester’s conflicts peak as Mia scrambles to reconcile relationships, emotions, and her sense of self.

=== Volume IX: Princess Mia ===
Volume IX: Princess Mia

This volume begins almost immediately after the end of Princess Diaries, Volume VIII: Princess on the Brink. Mia Thermopolis has just sent a message to her ex-boyfriend Michael Moscovitz, apologizing for fighting with him, breaking up, and kissing another guy. To clear her mind, Mia decides to go to the theater with that guy, J.P., (her best friend Lilly's ex) to see Beauty and the Beast: The Musical. Unfortunately, a picture of the two of them together ends up on the cover of the New York Post, making Lilly even more upset about the kiss, and leading to the end of the girls' friendship.

Mia has also been asked to give a speech for Domina Rei, a society of powerful women run by her arch enemy Lana Weinberger's mother. Of course Grand-mère is dying for Mia to give the speech, and potentially become a member since she herself was once blackballed from the organization. To make matters even worse, Mia discovers someone has created a website called "www.ihatemiathermopolis.com" which lists things that are terrible about her/mocking lists.

When Michael finally calls, he decides it is best that they stay "just friends". Unable to cope, Mia retreats to her room, begins binge-eating (mostly meat products which she used to not eat due to her vegetarianism), and refuses to go to school for four days. Eventually, Mia's family steps in. Her father takes her to see a cowboy psychologist, Dr. Knutz, who convinces Mia to return to school and try to move on with her life. Mia at first does not agree with Dr. Knutz's assessment that she is suffering from depression, however begins to see that he may be right.

Meanwhile, as Mia is preparing for her speech to the Domina Rei, she discovers an old ancestress; Princess Amelie, who ruled Genovia for twelve days while she was only sixteen, before dying of the bubonic plague. While reading Amelie's diary, Mia discovers a proclamation the young woman had written shortly before death allowing for open elections for a Genovian prime minister and reducing the monarchy to mere figureheads, like in England. Mia tells her father and Grand-mère who both advise her not to say anything about the document.

Dr. Knutz helps Mia decide to reveal Princess Amelie's story to the Domina Rei in her speech; this brave act earns her an invitation to join, and an e-mail from Michael. On her way home, she finds J.P., who had earlier confessed he was in love with her. She kisses him and then finally replies to Michael's e-mail in a happy mood.

=== Volume X: Forever Princess ===
Two years after the events of the ninth book, Mia finds herself preparing for her 18th birthday party, her prom, and her high school graduation within the space of a week. She is in a stable relationship with J.P., has become good friends with Lana, and maintains a friendly email correspondence with Michael, but remains painfully estranged from Lilly, who is now dating Kenny. However, Mia is still attached to her bad habit of lying: though she tells everyone otherwise, she has been accepted into every college she applied for, due to her royal status. She also unsuccessfully tries to publish her senior project, a steamy romance novel written under an alias, while telling her friends and family that the project is a paper on Genovian olive oil pressing. Adding to her anxieties, her father, Philippe, is running in the Genovian election for Prime Minister against her cousin, René, who is leading in the polls.

Having found immense success in Japan with the CardioArm, her ex, Michael, returns to Manhattan. He and Mia resume their friendship in person when she is forced to interview him for the school paper. Mia accidentally smells Michael's neck and her feelings for Michael come right back, making her feel wrong about JP. Mia soon finds herself questioning her relationship with J.P. and admits to herself she does not really feel attracted to him. To make matters worse, after finding out she wrote a romance novel (and congratulating her for it), Michael reads it and gives her a Princess Leia USB flashdrive, which he designed himself, for her birthday.

At Mia's birthday party, J.P. gives her a promise ring in front of all the guests, causing Michael to walk out. Mia accepts the ring, but begins to suspect J.P.'s motives: his senior project, a play about their relationship, reveals some of Mia's private moments without her consent; he never reads the novel she's written, and the paparazzi always seem to know when they are together. On top of that, Michael donates a CardioArm to Genovia, and Lilly films a commercial in support of Prince Philippe, helping his election prospects. Nonetheless, Mia continues her relationship with J.P., stubbornly thinking she owes him that much.

After a non-date with Michael on the Boat House on Senior Skip day, Mia and her ex-boyfriend go on a carriage ride through Central Park. They end up making out, for several blocks, but Mia runs off before he can confess his love. Later he texts her while she is at therapy saying he still loves her and would wait for her. At Prom night, Mia continues to feel that something is off about JP, especially when she realizes that he had booked a hotel room for them, ages before they made plans to attend the party at all. At Mia's insistence, Lilly tells her that J.P. only dated her in sophomore year to get closer to Mia, and that they had in fact slept together, contrary to his claims that he is a virgin. This leads Mia to realize that JP was lying to her all along, and the two girls make up. Mia then confronts JP about his lies, breaks up with him, and puts a cease-and-desist on his play. Unbeknownst to her, Michael was just within earshot and, having overheard what happened, is livid at JP. Mia dissuades him from beating JP up, offering to go with him to his apartment instead, where it is implied that they have sex and she gets her snowflake necklace back.

The next day, Mia learns that her father won the election by a landslide. Michael and Mia, boyfriend and girlfriend again, go back to Mia's loft, so she can get ready for her graduation. After a long speech by Kenny Showalter, they all leave for the party at Tavern on the Green. There, Mia reunites with Michael's family, has an awkward meeting with JP's dad, and finally announces to her parents and to Grandmère that she has picked Sarah Lawrence College (which was the college Grandmère had wanted Mia to go to and her father had suggested early in the series).

=== Volume XI: Royal Wedding ===
Eight years after the events of Forever Princess, Mia Thermopolis is about to turn 26, has graduated from college, and runs a youth community center in New York City named after her late stepfather Frank Gianini (whom we learn died unexpectedly of undiagnosed congestive heart failure). She is still dating Michael Moscovitz, and remains close to her high school friends. Perin and Ling Su are now a couple (they both work for Mia at the youth center), Lilly Moscovitz is a law student about to take the bar exam, Tina Hakim Baba is a medical student, though she has broken up with Boris (who left behind classical music to become the world's biggest rock star) due to Boris becoming embroiled in a sex scandal with a fan, Shameeka Taylor works in marketing for Vera Wang, and Lana Weinberger is now Lana Rockefeller, a married mom.

Mia's father, Prince Phillipe, is up for re-election as Genovia's prime minister, but becomes embroiled in scandal when he is arrested for car racing on the streets of New York, damaging his chances at re-election. He has also become a heavy drinker, which contributes to his unpopularity in the polls. The scandal has caused Mia to have to move into an apartment in the Genovian embassy, in order to be somewhat protected from the protesters and paparazzi that hound her every move.

While on vacation in the Exumas, Michael proposes to Mia, and she happily accepts. Upon their return to New York, Grand-mère tells her of a shocking discovery: Phillipe fathered an illegitimate child 12 years ago in a fling with a now-deceased charter flight pilot, and has been secretly making child-support payments all this time. After he confesses this to Mia, she tracks down her half-sister, Olivia Grace, in New Jersey, where she is being raised by her maternal aunt's family. Upon discovering that they are treating her poorly, she takes Olivia back to New York, where they are soon subject to intense press exposure and a custody battle with Olivia's aunt and uncle, who have been embezzling the child-support money. To complicate matters, Mia finds out that she is pregnant with twins when she goes to the doctor for a foot injury.

As she brings Olivia into the family, while preparing for her wedding, Mia comes to understand what Grand-mère has been trying to teach her for years: in the real world, there will be no one to cushion blows for you, and every challenge she has faced has been to prepare her for a situation like Olivia's. Phillipe, realizing that he is still in love with Mia's mother (to Grand-mère's dismay), abdicates and moves to Genovia with her, Rocky, and Olivia. At the end of the novel, Mia marries Michael, and prepares for her new life as crown princess of Genovia.

== Reception ==
=== Critical reception ===
The literary critic Sarah Rothschild describes the first book as one example of offering "princesses as strong, positive role models for modern girls," and Imelda Whelehan describes Mia's character as an example of a challenge to traditional conceptions of the princess. In response to both writers, Hanna Liljeqvist has observed the overall ambiguity of the fictional diary as medium, which reinforces traditional methods of women's storytelling. Liljeqvist also observes that Mia's character slowly becomes more normative over the course of the series, and that "the empowering potential of Mia’s feminine narration is somewhat ruined by its reliance on male approval as one of the main ways of challenging Mia’s (mis)conceptions of herself".

In 2002, the Young Adult Library Services Association included the second installment, Princess in the Spotlight, on their list of Quick Picks for Reluctant Young Adult Readers. Booklist's Chris Sherman considered Princess in the Spotlight "just as good as its predecessor". Sherman highlighted the novel's "fast, furious, and laugh-out-loud funny" plot, as well as Mia's character, who they described "as smart, sassy, self-absorbed, worried, and wistful as ever." Kirkus Reviews praised how "Cabot writes with a deft touch for humor as well as the convincing voice of a 14-year-old". Publishers Weekly offered the novel a starred review. Booklist also reviewed the audiobook narrated by Anne Hathaway.

On behalf of The Barnes & Noble Review, Beth Amos referred to the fourth book, Princess in Waiting, as "hilarious", noting that "Mia's self-deprecating wit, self-absorption, and adolescent angst are as entertaining as ever as she struggles with the realization that despite being a princess, she isn't guaranteed any fairy-tale endings." Kirkus Reviews also mentioned that the novel "is as hilarious and enjoyable as its predecessors". However, Amos noted that "while Mia's sometimes simplistic view of life remains intact and her adolescent shallowness is often apparent, she also shows an evolving maturity as she prepares for her royal role under Grand-mère's overbearing guidance." Kirkus Reviews also discussed the novel's format, written as a teenager's diary, which "lets the reader follow each twist-and-turn from Mia's point of view, with plenty of asides on current media events". While they considered these asides "fun", they also thought the references "will date quickly", with some readers already missing some of them at the time of the book's publication. Booklist also reviewed the audiobook narrated by Clea Lewis.

The last book in the series, Royal Wedding, received generally positive notices. Kirkus Reviews praised Cabot’s “hilarious dialogue” and “zany characters,” calling the novel “a funny, heartwarming story” that is “royally perfect from start to finish.” Booklist described it as “a whirlwind of jaw-dropping, hilarious, and occasionally touching events,” noting that original fans “now adults themselves, will be thrilled,” while it remains enjoyable across Cabot’s readership; this assessment is quoted on the author’s site. The novel was also named one of Glamour’s “Hottest Beach Reads” of Summer 2015, which called it “the next best thing” to a new Princess Diaries film and highlighted its focus on Mia’s royal wedding plans.

=== Awards and recognition ===
The series spent 48 weeks on the New York Times Children's Series Best Sellers List. Kirkus Reviews highlighted Cabot's skill in writing Mia's diaries "in perfect teenage vernacular". Similarly, while reviewing the audiobook, AudioFile praised Anne Hathaway's ability to portray Mia "in such a genuine manner".

Awards and nominations for The Princess Diaries
Year	Organization	Award	Result
2003	Tennessee Library Association	Volunteer State Book Award (Children's Choice)	Won
2003	South Carolina Association of School Librarians	Junior Book Award	Nominated
2003	BBC's The Big Read	Best Loved Novel	Nominated, placed 99th
2003	Washington Library Association	Evergreen Young Adult Book Award	Won
2003	Indiana Library Federation	Eliot Rosewater Indiana High School Book Award	Nominated
2005	Partners in Literacy	Colorado Blue Spruce Young Adult Book Award	Nominated

=== Selected reading lists ===
- American Library Association:
  - Best Books for Young Adults (2001)
  - Quick Picks for Reluctant Young Adult Readers (2001, 2002, 2003)
  - Popular Paperbacks for Young Adults (2003, 2014)
- New York Public Library's Books for the Teen Age (2001)
- Texas Lone Star Reading List (2001)
- International Reading Association's Young Adults' Choices (2002, 2004, 2006)
- Teen Read Week Top Ten (2004)
- NPR's 100 Best Ever Teen Novels (2012)
- Time's 100 Best YA Books of All Time (2021)

== Adaptations ==
=== Film series ===
The first novel was adapted into the 2001 teen comedy film The Princess Diaries, produced by Walt Disney Pictures and directed by Garry Marshall. Anne Hathaway stars as Mia Thermopolis with Julie Andrews portraying Queen Clarisse Renaldi. While the film preserves Mia’s essential character traits, it diverges from the novel in several ways: Mia is 15 years old, drives a 1965 Mustang, and lives in San Francisco. The royal family's last name is changed from Renaldo to Renaldi. Most notably, her father has recently died and does not appear in the film. The film was a major box office success and has been credited with boosting the popularity of Cabot’s book series.

The Princess Diaries film series currently consists of two teen comedy films starring Anne Hathaway in the titular role and Julie Andrews as Queen Clarisse Renaldi, produced by Walt Disney Pictures and distributed by Walt Disney Studios Motion Pictures under their former name Buena Vista Pictures Distribution. 2001's The Princess Diaries, based on the first novel, was a major success, becoming an unexpected box office hit. 2004's The Princess Diaries 2: Royal Engagement was not based on any existing book, and performed well at the box office but receive mixed reviews from critics. A third entry in the film series will also be distributed by Walt Disney Studios Motion Pictures and is currently in the casting stage of production, and will feature Mia's half-sister Olivia from From the Notebooks of a Middle School Princess in a lead role. The existing films diverge greatly from the plot of the novels, but Cabot has publicly thanked the films repeatedly in interviews and online for contributing significantly to her book sales and success as an author.

Film	Release date	Director	Screenwriters	Producers
The Princess Diaries	August 3, 2001	Garry Marshall	Gina Wendkos	Whitney Houston, Debra Martin Chase & Mario Iscovich
The Princess Diaries 2: Royal Engagement	August 11, 2004	Garry Marshall	Shonda Rhimes	Whitney Houston & Debra Martin Chase
The Princess Diaries 3: Heir to Genovia	TBA	Adele Lim	TBA	TBA

=== Parodies ===
The first season of the Netflix adult animated comedy series Q-Force features Stephanie Beatriz as Mira Popadopolous, based on Mia Thermopolis, whose backstory adapts the events of The Princess Diaries.

== See also ==
- Ruritanian romance: a genre of stories set in a fictional country.
