= Princess in Love =

Princess in Love may refer to:

- Princess in Love, a 1994 book about Princess Diana, by Anna Pasternak
- The Princess Diaries, Volume III: Princess in Love, a 2002 novel by Meg Cabot
