= From the Notebooks of a Middle School Princess =

Series of young adult novels by Meg Cabot

- Cover of the first book in the series
- From the Notebooks of a Middle School Princess (2015); Royal Day Out (2016); Royal Wedding Disaster (2016); Royal Crush (2017); Royal Crown (2018)
- Author: Meg Cabot
- Country: U.S.
- Language: English
- Genre: young adult novel
- No. of books: 5
- Website: From the Notebooks of a Middle School Princess

From the Notebooks of a Middle School Princess is a spinoff series of young adult novels written and illustrated by Meg Cabot, and is also the title of the first novel in the series From the Notebooks of a Middle School Princess, published in 2015. It is written in the same epistolary style as the original series by the same author, The Princess Diaries. As with its predecessor, the series revolves around a teenage girl who discovers that she is the princess of a small European principality called Genovia. The distinction between this and the original series is a slight age difference and the fact that the main character is biracial.

The latest published book in the series, Royal Crown was released in 2018. According to the author, it is “the fourth and final (so far) book in the Notebooks of a Middle School Princess series.” (It is technically the fifth title as Royal Day Out is number one and a half in the series.) The series is set primarily in the fictional European country of Genovia, a principality between France and Spain ruled by Olivia's sister, Princess Mia Renaldo.

== Characters ==
- Olivia Grace Clarisse Mignonette Harrison, Princess of Genovia is the protagonist of the series. She is the daughter of Elizabeth Harrison (deceased), a charter jet pilot, and Philippe Renaldo, the Crown Prince of Genovia.
- Nishi Desai is Olivia's best friend. Though she lives in Olivia's hometown of Cranbrook, New Jersey, she spends most of her vacation time visiting Olivia in Genovia.
- Khalil bin Zayed Faisal, Prince of Qalif is a "prince without a country". He and his parents are among the many refugees that fled Qalif and requested asylum in Genovia after his despotic uncle instigated a civil war. Prince Khalil is a boarding student at the Royal Genovian Academy and Olivia's main love interest.
- Clarisse Marie Grimaldi Renaldo is the dowager Princess of Genovia and Olivia's paternal grandmother. Olivia refers to her as "Grandmère" (French for "Grandmother").
- Amelia Mignonette Thermopolis Renaldo, Princess of Genovia, Mia Thermopolis, is Olivia's half-sister and the current Princess Regent of Genovia. She is the daughter of Helen Thermopolis, a painter, and Philippe Renaldo, the Crown Prince of Genovia.
- Prince Consort Michael Renaldo of Genovia, Michael Moscovitz, is Mia's husband. He is the inventor of the CardioArm, a robotic surgical arm for closed heart surgery, and the founder of Pavlov Surgical.
- Artur Christoff Phillipe Gerard Grimaldi Renaldo, Prince of Genovia is Olivia's father. He was the first Prime Minister when Genovia transitioned from traditional principality to constitutional principality.
- Rocky Thermopolis-Gianini is Olivia's step-brother. He is the son of Helen Thermopolis, Mia's mother, and Frank Gianini (deceased), Mia's high school algebra teacher.
- Helen Rinaldo, Princess of Genovia, Helen Thermopolis, is Mia and Rocky's mother. She is a well known painter whose works are often intended to make a political statement.
- Lady Luisa Ferrari, a student at the Royal Genovian Academy, is Olivia's often antagonistic, conflict-creating cousin.
- Prince Gunther Lapsburg von Stuben is the prince of Stockerdörfl and a student at the Royal Genovian Academy.

== Volumes ==
=== From the Notebooks of a Middle School Princess ===
From the Notebooks of a Middle School Princess is the first book in the series and was released on May 19, 2015. The book, released on May 19, 2015 through Feiwel & Friends, is the first in the series of the same name, From the Notebooks of a Middle School Princess. It follows Olivia, a biracial 12-year-old who finds out she is the paternal younger half-sister of Princess Mia Thermopolis.

Olivia's adventures are written in the form of a diary, with the author's illustrations . Cabot has stated that the character of Olivia differs from Mia in that she's "much less neurotic, much more stable" and that her upbringing gave the character a greater appreciation for the discovery that she was a princess with previously unknown family members, as she "hasn't been loved to the degree that Mia has. I mean, Olivia actually likes her grandmother, really appreciates her, and she's very excited to have this happen to her."

Olivia, full name "Olivia Grace Clarisse Mignonette Harrison," had always been completely average at everything other than art. Other than being a half orphan, her life had been fairly uneventful. This changed when Princess Amelia "Mia," who turned out to be her elder half-sister, arrived and invited her to come and meet the father that she had never met, Prince Phillipe Renaldo. Olivia was whisked off to live with her father and half-sister in a world where she became a princess in training. The book deals with the effect this drastic change in circumstances has on her.

Critical reception has been positive. The School Library Journal and the Horn Book Guide both reviewed From the Notebooks of a Middle School Princess, with the School Library Journal writing that the "bubble-gum flavored contemporary tale will be a perfect fit for Fancy Nancy alumni and readers not quite ready for Cabot's longer novels". Booklist and Kirkus Reviews also gave favorable reviews, and Booklist felt that "this entertaining, quickly absorbing read will have readers anticipating the sequel." The Bulletin of the Center for Children's Books was more critical, as they commented that "fans of the earlier series may find this too familiar of a retread" but also stated that "Olivia has an amusing and self-deprecating wit that makes the narration breezy and accessible, and Cabot's black and white illustrations liven up the tale."

=== Royal Day Out ===
Royal Day Out is the second book in the series and was released on May 10, 2016.

=== Royal Wedding Disaster ===
Cover of Royal Wedding Disaster

Royal Wedding Disaster is the third book in the series and was released on May 10, 2016. The book was released on May 10, 2016 and follows Olivia, Princess Mia Thermopolis's biracial half sister as she gets used to her new school in Genovia and prepares for her sister's wedding. It was published April 21, 2017 in the United Kingdom as Bridesmaid-in-Training by Macmillan Children's Books.

Just a month after discovering she was a princess and moving out of the US to live in Genovia, Olivia along with her step brother Rocky, joins a new school, the "Royal Genovian Academy". There she meets her snobbish cousin Lady Luisa and Princes Khalil and Gunther as well as all the other royals at the school. Olivia is also supposed to be a junior bridesmaid at her half-sister's royal wedding. But with only a week left before the biggest event of the country nothing seems to be ready or going well. The book describes attempts by Olivia and her grandmother Princess Clarisse to cope with this.

Cabot said the sequel to The Notebooks of a Middle School Princess is The Royal Wedding Disaster. She told the group of children, “A lot of my books, I wrote by hand when I was your age. There were no laptops then.” She explained what fan fiction was and said she loved Princess Leia from Star Wars.

=== Royal Crush ===
Royal Crush is the fourth book in the series and was released in 2017.

=== Royal Crown ===
Royal Crown is the fifth book in the series and was released in 2018.

== See also ==
- Republic of Genoa: a historical republic bearing geographical and cultural similarities to the fictional modern Genovia.
- Ruritanian romance: a genre of stories set in a fictional country.
