= The Princess Diaries, Volume II: Princess in the Spotlight =

2001 novel by Meg Cabot

The Princess Diaries Volume II: Princess in the Spotlight
- First edition cover
- Author: Meg Cabot
- Language: English
- Series: The Princess Diaries
- Genre: Young adult novel
- Publisher: HarperTrophy
- Publication date: June 26, 2001
- Publication place: United States
- Media type: Print (Hardback & Paperback)
- Pages: 240 pp (first edition, hardback)
- ISBN: 0-06-029465-5 (first edition, hardback)
- OCLC: 47208490
- LC Class: PZ7.C11165 Pt 2001
- Preceded by: The Princess Diaries
- Followed by: The Princess Diaries, Volume III: Princess in Love

The Princess Diaries Volume II: Princess in the Spotlight, released in the United Kingdom as Princess Diaries: Take Two, is the second book in the series The Princess Diaries by Meg Cabot and was published in 2001. The book is not related to the film released with the title The Princess Diaries 2: Royal Engagement, where the heroine Mia is awaiting coronation, but can only be queen if she marries within thirty days.

== Plot ==
In the second novel of Princess Diaries, Mia must learn to deal with the public and reporters, beginning with a primetime interview Mia is instructed to attend by her Grand-mère, despite Mia's protests. When Mia gets sick, she thinks that the interview will be cancelled, but she is enticed out of her sickbed by the notion of a "secret admirer," and cannot avoid the interview.

During the interview itself, Mia says a number of embarrassing things, including that her mother is pregnant with the baby of her boyfriend, Mr. Gianini (who is also Mia's algebra teacher). The pregnancy revealed, Mia's mother asks Mr. Gianni to marry her. Grandmère organizes for the Royal Genovian Event Planner to be flown to New York from Genovia to plan an elaborate, elitist wedding. Mia has to deal with the unwanted attention brought on by the interview, along with the knowledge that a secret admirer has been sending her emails under the name of JoCrox.

On the day of the wedding, Mia discovers that her mom and Mr. Gianini have eloped in Mexico with the help of her father. Mia herself manages to escape the wedding extravaganza in her bridesmaid gown to attend the Halloween screening of The Rocky Horror Picture Show with her friends, where she discovers that her secret admirer is her biology partner Kenny Showalter. Mia is disappointed, as she has been hoping that it would be Michael, her own crush, and Lilly's (her best friend's) older brother.

The book ends with Mia philosophically reflecting that what doesn't kill us makes us stronger, and that she cannot hurt Kenny's feelings and accepts a date with him.

== Reception ==
In 2002, the Young Adult Library Services Association included Princess in the Spotlight on their list of Quick Picks for Reluctant Young Adult Readers.

Booklist's Chris Sherman considered Princess in the Spotlight "just as good as its predecessor". Sherman highlighted the novel's "fast, furious, and laugh-out-loud funny" plot, as well as Mia's character, who they described "as smart, sassy, self-absorbed, worried, and wistful as ever."

Kirkus Reviews praised how "Cabot writes with a deft touch for humor as well as the convincing voice of a 14-year-old".

Publishers Weekly offered the novel a starred review.

Booklist also reviewed the audiobook narrated by Anne Hathaway.
