= Bruce Green =

American film editor

- Occupation: Film editor

Bruce Green is an American film editor known for his work with directors such as Garry Marshall, Mark Waters, and Jon Turteltaub. Trained by editor Michael Kahn, he was the first assistant editor on Raiders of the Lost Ark (1981) and Indiana Jones and the Temple of Doom (1984). He was in the visual effects department of Star Wars (1977).

Green began his career editing Friday the 13th films, including Friday the 13th: A New Beginning and Friday the 13th Part VI: Jason Lives. Later, he edited films such as Cool Runnings, The Princess Diaries and Freaky Friday. He has also worked in television, editing Jane the Virgin.

Bruce was on the board of directors of the Motion Picture Editors Guild, Hollywood.

== Filmography ==
Film
Year	Title	Director
1985	Friday the 13th: A New Beginning	Danny Steinmann
1985	Prime Risk	Michael Farkas
1986	April Fool's Day	Fred Walton
1986	Friday the 13th Part VI: Jason Lives	Tom McLoughlin
1987	Square Dance	Daniel Petrie
1988	Punchline	David Seltzer
1989	Three Fugitives	Francis Veber
1990	Young Guns II	Geoff Murphy
1990	Welcome Home, Roxy Carmichael	Jim Abrahams
1991	The Doctor	Randa Haines
1993	The Vanishing	George Sluizer
1993	Cool Runnings	Jon Turteltaub
1994	Angels in the Outfield	William Dear
1995	While You Were Sleeping	Jon Turteltaub
1996	Two If by Sea	Bill Bennett
1996	Phenomenon	Jon Turteltaub
1997	Home Alone 3	Raja Gosnell
1999	The Other Sister	Garry Marshall
1999	Runaway Bride	Garry Marshall
2000	Big Momma's House	Raja Gosnell
2000	Spin Cycle	Scott Marshall
2001	The Princess Diaries	Garry Marshall
2002	The Guru	Daisy von Scherler Mayer
2003	Freaky Friday	Mark Waters
2004	Raising Helen	Garry Marshall
2004	The Princess Diaries 2: Royal Engagement	Garry Marshall
2005	Just Like Heaven	Mark Waters
2005	Yours, Mine & Ours	Raja Gosnell
2007	Georgia Rule	Garry Marshall
2007	Martian Child	Menno Meyjes
2008	Baby Mama	Michael McCullers
2008	Extreme Movie	Adam J. Epstein; Andy Jacobsen
2009	Ghosts of Girlfriends Past	Mark Waters
2010	Valentine's Day	Garry Marshall
2011	Mr. Popper's Penguins	Mark Waters
2013	Fat	Mark Phinney
2013	The Suitcase	Eden Sher
2016	Mother's Day	Garry Marshall
2020	Magic Camp	Mark Waters
2024	Upgraded	Carlson Young
2025	Maintenance Required	Lacey Uhlemeyer

Television
Year	Title	Notes
2013	Witches of East End	TV series (4 episodes)
2014	Franklin & Bash	TV series (3 episodes)
2014-2015	Jane the Virgin	TV series (7 episodes)
2017	The Mick	TV pilot episode

=== Actor ===
- Crystal Lake Memories: The Complete History of Friday the 13th (2013) (Documentary film) - Himself
