= The Princess Diaries (film) =

2001 film by Garry Marshall

- Theatrical release poster
- Directed by: Garry Marshall
- Screenplay by: Gina Wendkos
- Based on: The Princess Diaries by Meg Cabot
- Produced by: Whitney Houston; Debra Martin Chase; Mario Iscovich
- Starring: Anne Hathaway; Héctor Elizondo; Heather Matarazzo; Mandy Moore; Caroline Goodall; Robert Schwartzman; Julie Andrews
- Cinematography: Karl Walter Lindenlaub
- Edited by: Bruce Green
- Music by: John Debney
- Production companies: Walt Disney Pictures; BrownHouse Productions
- Distributed by: Buena Vista Pictures Distribution
- Release dates: July 29, 2001 (El Capitan Theatre); August 3, 2001 (United States)
- Running time: 115 minutes
- Country: United States
- Language: English
- Budget: $26 million
- Box office: $165.3 million

The Princess Diaries is a 2001 American comedy film directed by Garry Marshall from a screenplay by Gina Wendkos. Produced by Walt Disney Pictures, it is based on Meg Cabot's 2000 novel of the same name and stars Anne Hathaway (in her film debut), Julie Andrews, Héctor Elizondo, Heather Matarazzo, Mandy Moore, Caroline Goodall, and Robert Schwartzman. In the film, shy American teenager Mia Thermopolis (Hathaway) learns she is crown princess of Genovia and receives tutelage from her estranged grandmother Clarisse Renaldi (Andrews), Genovia's Queen regent, as she decides whether to claim or renounce her title.

Development on the film began after Cabot's agent, believing in the novel's feature film potential, pursued Debra Martin Chase to adapt it: Chase eventually secured a deal with Disney, and the film was greenlit in August 1999, being co-produced with Whitney Houston's BrownHouse Productions. Wendkos collaborated with Chase on the screenplay, which differs from Cabot's novel, with certain themes softened and other aspects introduced or removed, as Marshall sought to create a G-rated film with broad appeal to adults and children. Hathaway was cast in 2000 while Andrews (who was then semi-retired from acting), joined due to Marshall's involvement, marking her first Disney film since Mary Poppins (1964). The rest of the cast, which included the return of Marshall's frequent collaborator Elizondo and Marshall's family in minor roles, was rounded out soon thereafter. Principal photography took place from September to December 2000, with filming locations including Walt Disney Studios in Burbank and in San Francisco. The film's costumes were designed by Gary Jones and the music was composed by John Debney.

The Princess Diaries premiered at the El Capitan Theatre in Los Angeles on July 29, 2001, and was theatrically released in the United States on August 3, by Buena Vista Pictures Distribution. A sleeper hit, the film grossed $165.3 million worldwide, defying industry expectations of an underperformance due to its G-rating and subject matter. Upon release, The Princess Diaries received mixed reviews from critics, with praise for Hathaway's and Andrews' performances (establishing Hathaway as a bankable star and reviving Andrews' career), but criticism for its plot. It received retrospective praise for its themes of self-discovery and identity and its centering of female characters. A sequel, The Princess Diaries 2: Royal Engagement, was released in 2004, and a third installment is in development.

== Plot ==
Grove High School student Mia Thermopolis resides with her single mother, Helen, in a refurbished firehouse in San Francisco. Unpopular among her peers, Mia suffers from a fear of public speaking while harboring a crush on Josh Bryant, and is often teased by his popular girlfriend, Lana Thomas. Mia's only friends are political activist Lilly Moscovitz and Lilly's older brother, Michael, who secretly harbors feelings for Mia.

Mia is invited to meet her estranged paternal grandmother, Clarisse, on a diplomatic visit to San Francisco. Mia learns that she is the sole heir to the small European kingdom of Genovia, having inherited the position from her recently deceased father, Philippe. Clarisse is determined to make Mia into a refined princess so that she may one day rule the kingdom, which Clarisse currently presides over as Queen of Genovia. Overwhelmed at the discovery, Mia initially refuses until her mother convinces her to attend her grandmother's "princess lessons" based on the condition that she need not make her final decision until the Genovian Independence Day Ball in three weeks' time.

Mia receives a glamorous makeover and a limousine chauffeured by Joe, the queen's head of security and confidant, who becomes a father figure to her. Mia's transformation causes her schoolmates to treat her differently, while her increasingly hectic schedule strains her relationship with Lilly. To appease her best friend, Mia tells Lilly the truth and swears her to secrecy. However, the public soon learns that Mia is a princess after the secret is sold to the press by Paolo, the beautician responsible for Mia's makeover, and paparazzi begin to pursue her relentlessly. Although Mia embarrasses herself at her first state dinner, Clarisse admits that she found her clumsiness endearing and suggests that they spend quality time together, canceling their lessons for the afternoon. While bonding, Clarisse explains that although Mia's parents loved each other, they divorced amicably in order to pursue their own passions: Philippe remaining in Genovia to eventually become king, and Helen returning to America with Mia to offer her a "normal" childhood.

As Mia's popularity grows, Josh invites her to attend the end-of-school beach party with him. Mia accepts, causing her to neglect Lilly and cancel plans she made with Michael. The paparazzi ambush Mia at the beach party. Josh publicly kisses Mia to get his 15 minutes of fame, while Lana exposes Mia wearing only a towel; both photographs are printed in the newspaper the following day. Finding the photos inappropriate for a princess, Clarisse admonishes Mia for her behavior, after which a humiliated Mia promises to renounce her title. Joe reminds Clarisse that Mia is still both a teenager and her granddaughter, implying that the queen reacted too harshly.

After making amends with Lilly, Mia gets back at Josh during PE and finally stands up to Lana for bullying a schoolmate. Mia invites both Lilly and Michael to the ball but Michael declines, still heartbroken over Mia's initial dismissal. After Clarisse apologizes to Mia for scolding her, she states that Mia must publicly renounce the throne at the ball. Terrified by the prospect, Mia plans to take a trip to Colorado until she discovers a touching birthday letter from her late father and relents. Mia's car malfunctions while driving to the ball, stranding her in a downpour until Joe rescues her in his limo, with the help of Mia's neighbor, Mr. Robutusen.

When they finally arrive, Mia, still wet and untidy from the rain, accepts her role as Princess of Genovia while Clarisse, Helen, and Lilly look on proudly. After changing into a gown, Mia accompanies Clarisse into the ballroom where Michael, who has accepted Mia's apology, invites her to dance before proceeding to the courtyard, where they confess their feelings for each other and share their first kiss. In the final scene, Mia travels to Genovia on a private jet with her pet cat Fat Louie, and writes in her diary that she plans to relocate to Genovia with her mother.

== Cast ==
Order of credits adapted from Variety magazine and Turner Classic Movies:

- Julie Andrews as Clarisse Renaldi, Mia's grandmother and Queen regnant of Genovia
- Anne Hathaway as Mia Thermopolis, heir to the throne and Princess of Genovia
- Héctor Elizondo as Joe, Clarisse's head of security and Mia's limousine driver
- Heather Matarazzo as Lilly Moscovitz, Mia's eccentric and socially conscious childhood best friend
- Mandy Moore as Lana Thomas, a popular cheerleader and mean girl who bullies Mia and other students
- Caroline Goodall as Helen Thermopolis, Mia's mother; an artist
- Robert Schwartzman as Michael Moscovitz, Lilly's older brother who harbors romantic feelings for Mia
- Erik Von Detten as Josh Bryant, a popular, egotistical student on whom Mia develops a crush
- Sean O'Bryan as Patrick O'Connell, Mia's English teacher who begins to date Helen
- Sandra Oh as Geraldine Gupta, vice principal of Mia's school
- Kathleen Marshall as Charlotte Kutaway, Clarisse's secretary
- Patrick Flueger as Jeremiah Hart, a friend of Mia and Lilly's; an aspiring magician
- Mindy Burbano as Anita Harbula, Mia's gym teacher
- René Auberjonois as the voice of Philippe Renaldi, Mia's late father, Clarisse’s son, and former crown Prince of Genovia

- Gerald Hathaway, Hathaway's father, portrays Philippe in photographs and flashbacks

- Larry Miller as Paolo Puttanesca, Mia's hairdresser and beautician
- Patrick Richwood as Mr. Robutusen, Mia's neighbor; a writer
- Mayor Willie Brown as himself
- Joel McCrary as Prime Minister Motaz
- John McGivern as Bruce McIntosh
- Fat Louie as himself, Mia's cat
- James Brown-Orleans as Doc Motors

== Production ==
=== Development ===
The Princess Diaries is based on the 2000 young adult novel of the same name by author Meg Cabot. Cabot's agent believed the first Princess Diaries book showed promising film potential, and pursued Debra Martin Chase, who had recently produced the television film Rodgers & Hammerstein's Cinderella (1997), about adapting the novel into a film due to the story's shared "rags-to-riches" and "Cinderella-type" themes. Having enjoyed the book herself, Chase convinced Disney to adapt it into a feature-length project. Disney chairman Peter Schneider optioned the project in an "effort to re-establish the Disney brand for live-action family films". Disney paid Cabot $4,000 for the film rights, although some media outlets reported that Cabot had been offered "mid- to low-six figures". Cabot recalled that Disney's decision to adapt The Princess Diaries resulted in a promotion at her own job, prior to which publishers had been unwilling to publish her novel due to concerns that some of its content was inappropriate for young readers. HarperCollins showed interest in Cabot's manuscript in 1999, followed by Disney shortly afterward.

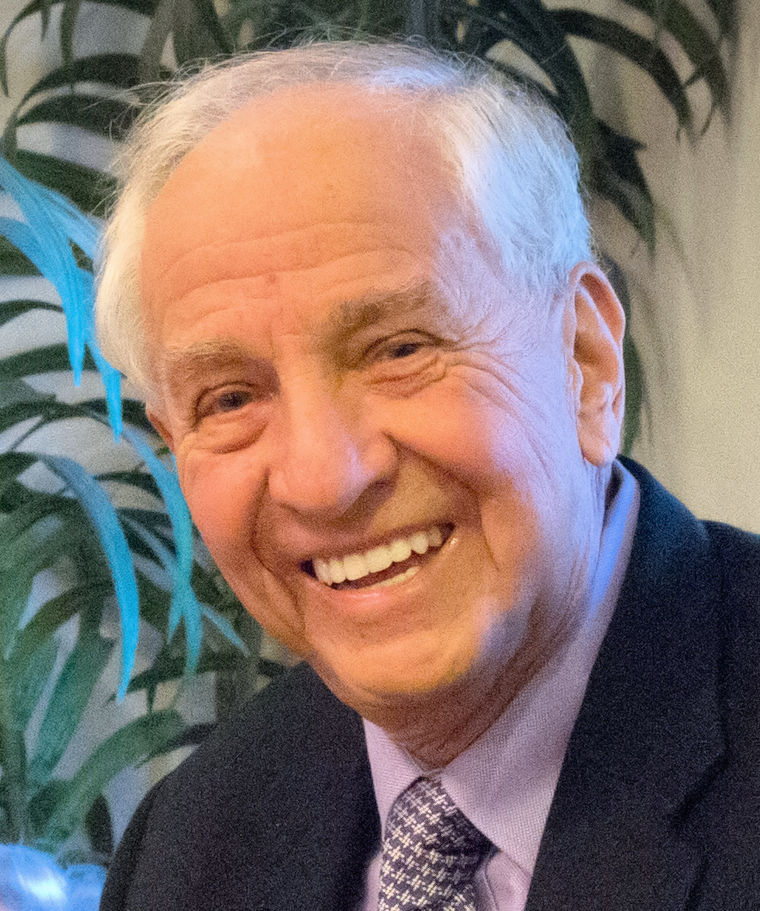
Garry Marshall served as the film's director and changed the novel's setting from New York to San Francisco for the film in honor of his grandchildren.

By August 1999, the film was greenlit by Disney who agreed to produce it with singer Whitney Houston's BrownHouse Productions, and Cabot's manuscript was forwarded to potential screenwriters. Chase developed the script with screenwriter Gina Wendkos. Although Cabot did not write the screenplay herself, she discussed changes deemed necessary for translating the story from page to screen with Chase, maintaining that "The essence of the story, or the message, of staying true to yourself ... still comes through". Garry Marshall was enlisted as director, with Houston and Chase producing alongside Mario Iscovich. Marshall had already been pitching ideas to Disney executive Nina Jacobson before he was hired. He found The Princess Diaries ideal family entertainment, and was particularly drawn to the idea of "a young girl turning into a woman and realizing that she can have a positive effect on the world", hoping it would appeal to girls, boys and adults. Furthermore, the director admitted to being fond of "female wish-fulfillment and empowerment movies". However, Marshall nearly turned down the film due to a typo in its original treatment that read "The Princess Dairies", prompting him to mistake it for a movie about cows. The Princess Diaries was Houston's first feature film production venture, and her studio's second film after Cinderella. Houston and Chase hoped that The Princess Diaries would be BrownHouse Productions' first in a series of female-led wish-fulfillment films, originally planning to remake the musical film Sparkle (1976) as a follow-up. Chase recalled that, at the time, Hollywood believed that while girls would willingly see a film intended for boys, it was difficult to convince boys to see a female-oriented film, but were encouraged by the success of Disney's The Parent Trap (1998).

The Princess Diaries was optioned to challenge the belief that children were losing interest in live-action films targeted towards girls, and Marshall was hired specifically to make a G-rated film "edgy and crazy and maybe something the adults will like". The film differs considerably from the novel. Initially intended to be set in New York like Cabot's book, the film was originally called The Princess of Tribeca. The title was reverted once the setting was changed to San Francisco, California, a decision Marshall made because the latter is home to both himself and his granddaughters, to whom the film is dedicated. Although Mia and Lilly remain environmentally and politically conscious, the filmmakers softened some of the more political aspects of their personalities to prevent the film from resembling "a political diatribe". Some aspects of the script were inspired by Cabot's own childhood, particularly when her mother began dating one of her teachers shortly after her father's death. Despite being consulted about such changes, Cabot distanced herself from the creative process to avoid compromising her vision for future novels, preferring that the book and film exist in separate universes. Cabot maintains that she had little creative input in the film, elaborating, "I don't think Garry Marshall needs 'help' to make a movie… from a novelist who has absolutely no experience in film-making." Although Cabot admitted that Disney consulted with her before making changes, she described their conversations as more informative than collaborative. Cabot acknowledged the challenge of adapting a 300-page novel, which she had written in the form of a diary, into a 90-page screenplay but was ultimately satisfied with the final results and Marshall's direction.

=== Casting ===
Chase decided that the main cast's ethnicity would remain faithful to the novel because Mia and Clarisse rule a European country, and the producer preferred to "make good movies" as opposed to only African-American films. Aged eighteen at the time, Anne Hathaway was cast in the lead role of Mia Thermopolis after Juliette Lewis turned it down. The Princess Diaries was Hathaway's first major film role, for which she auditioned during a 26-hour layover in Los Angeles, California while traveling to New Zealand to film The Other Side of Heaven (2001). Her only prior acting credit had been in the short-lived television series Get Real. Hathaway recalled that she fell out of her chair out of nervousness, and her inherent clumsiness is credited with impressing Marshall. Several established young actresses had been considered for the role, including Reese Witherspoon, Kirsten Dunst, Natalie Portman, Scarlett Johansson, Alicia Silverstone, Jessica Biel, Claire Danes, Kate Hudson, Cameron Diaz, Drew Barrymore, Sarah Michelle Gellar, Brittany Murphy, Katie Holmes, Christina Applegate, Kate Beckinsale, and Eva Mendes, while Liv Tyler was deemed a front-runner. Christy Carlson Romano was unable to audition due to scheduling conflicts while filming the Disney Channel series Even Stevens. Marshall's granddaughters convinced the director to cast Hathaway over Tyler because they felt that she possessed the more "princess-like hair". The actress was cast based solely on her audition, without performing a screen test. While Marshall believed that several other candidates seemed capable of embodying Mia's comedic side, he felt that only Hathaway possessed "the grace and authority" required to deliver the character's climactic speech. Hathaway identified with Mia's personality and struggles with self-confidence, drawing similarities between the character's shyness and her own awkwardness in high school. For Marshall, Hathaway's appearance and performance were reminiscent of Julia Roberts, whom he had directed to great success in the romantic comedy Pretty Woman (1990). He described her as a fusion of Roberts, comedian Harpo Marx, and his own sister, actress-director Penny Marshall. Hathaway gained weight for the role to more closely resemble "a regular teen".

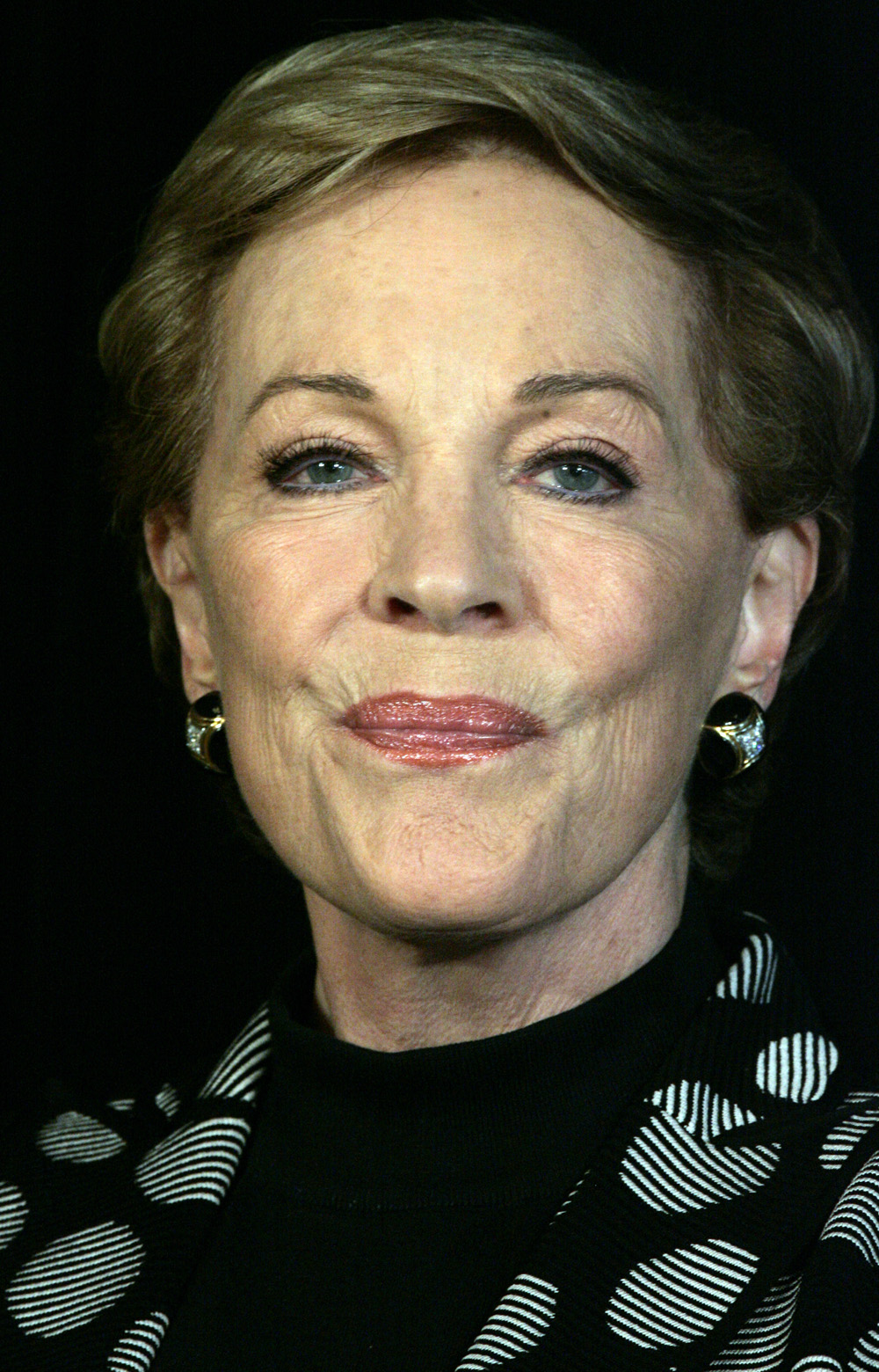
Julie Andrews was cast as Clarisse Renaldi, in her first Disney role since Mary Poppins (1964). The character was expanded significantly for the film, compared to the novel.

Julie Andrews, who had been semi-retired from acting at the time, was cast as Clarisse Renaldi. Marshall personally invited Andrews to discuss the film with him; she identified the director as "the hook" that ultimately convinced her to accept the role, having already been a fan of his work. She accepted solely based on her conversations with Marshall without reading the script. Although Sophia Loren is rumored to have been offered the part, Marshall insists that Andrews was the first and only actor he considered, having been a fan of hers since Broadway's My Fair Lady (1956). Known for portraying nobility throughout her career, Andrews incorporated knowledge she had acquired about European royalty and Britain's royal family into her performance; Elizabeth II herself had knighted Andrews a Dame of the British Empire one year prior. Marshall allowed Andrews significant creative freedom over Clarisse's portrayal. Cabot was initially wary of Andrews's casting, fearing the actress was too kind to play such a stern character, but ultimately felt her portrayal possessed the necessary combination of regality and grandmotherly warmth. Andrews also used the opportunity to mentor Hathaway, although she maintains that the younger actress required very little training due to her natural instincts. The Princess Diaries was Andrews's first Disney film since Mary Poppins (1964), 37 years prior.

Marshall cast Heather Matarazzo as Lilly Moscovitz after casting director Marcia Ross introduced them to each other, promising that Matarazzo was different from other actresses he had interviewed for the part. Matarazzo participated in a chemistry reading opposite Hathaway after auditioning for Marshall. Although Hathaway believes the two actresses had met several times prior to filming The Princess Diaries, Matarazzo claims she does not remember meeting Hathaway before their chemistry reading. The actress cites Marshall as her favourite director, whose positive energy she described as unrivaled by his peers. Héctor Elizondo was cast as Joe, Mia's limousine driver and Clarisse's head of security. Elizondo is known for appearing in all 18 films Marshall directed. Singer Mandy Moore was cast as Lana Thomas, her first credited film role. Marshall was the first film director with whom Moore, sixteen years old at the time, ever worked, and appreciated that most of her co-stars were similar to her own age. Robert Schwartzman was cast as Michael, Mia's love interest and Lilly's brother. His real-life band Rooney has a cameo appearance as garage band Flypaper, with Schwartzman playing their lead singer. The musicians perform "Blueside", one of Rooney's original songs. Schwartzman wanted to change his last name in the credits to Cage in honor of his cousin Nicolas Cage, but the film's promotional material had already been finalized. The Princess Diaries remains Schwartzman's only major film role.

Marshall cast several of his own family members in supporting and minor roles. His daughter Kathleen plays Clarisse's secretary, Charlotte Kutaway. The character, whose surname is only revealed during the end credits, was named after how often she is used in cutaway shots, and her role references the filmmaking technique of cutting away to someone whenever something goes awry. Marshall's wife appears as a ball guest, while his twin granddaughters Lily and Charlotte, the same granddaughters who inspired him to cast Hathaway, appear as a pair of schoolgirls asking for Mia's autograph. Marshall himself has a brief cameo during the Genovian Independence Day Ball, alongside sister Penny. San Francisco Mayor Willie Brown portrayed himself in a cameo appearance, during which he is briefly interviewed upon arriving at the same ball.

=== Further writing ===
Additional adjustments were made to the script once the cast was finalized. Marshall was constantly trying to make the film funnier because Disney had challenged him to incorporate humor into the G-rated project. Marshall drew from experience writing for the family-oriented shows Happy Days and The Odd Couple, whose scripts he revisited for inspiration. Matarazzo described the set as a collaborative and familial environment fostered by Marshall, consisting of birthday parties for cast and crew members, including Marshall himself.

Mia's grandmother, nicknamed "Grandmere" in the novel, is depicted as considerably kinder in the film. Disney's decision to have Mia's father be deceased is among the film's most significant deviations from its source material, in which he is both alive and plays an integral role. The producers decided to kill off Mia's father to expand Clarisse's role, for which they had wanted Andrews cast from the beginning. Once she learned of Andrews' involvement, Cabot approved that Mia's father be eliminated, much of whose dialogue was re-written for Mia's grandmother. Upon Marshall's request, Andrews suggested that the fictional country of Genovia be famous for its pears, after which the set was decorated with artificial pears and pear-shaped statues. Marshall wrote Hathaway's childhood struggles with wearing a retainer into the film; the actress filmed a scene wearing the same retainer she had worn as a child. Elizondo and Andrews campaigned for a romantic relationship between their characters, an idea that originated during a table reading in which the actors improvised saying "you're cute" to each other. The actors improvised their dance sequence, which Elizondo credits with developing his character.

Marshall worked with Larry Miller, who portrays Mia's hair stylist Paolo, to improvise humorous moments, such as shrieking upon seeing Mia for the first time and drawing his styling tools from his pockets as though they are pistols. Wendkos said Miller's Paolo was deliberately written to be "over-the-top". "Not you, I don't even know you", one of Matarazzo's most oft-quoted lines which she utters to someone while running down the street, was entirely improvised at the suggestion of Chase. Joe recites "No one can make you feel inferior without your consent" to Mia, a famous quote originally by former United States First Lady Eleanor Roosevelt. Mia recites one of Juliet's soliloquies from William Shakespeare's Romeo and Juliet, a deliberate reference to the fact that Hathaway shares her full name with Shakespeare's wife. Houston conceived the scene in which Mia smears her ice cream cone on Lana's cheerleader uniform. Wendkos spent more effort revising Mia's makeover sequence than any other scene in the filming, wanting to achieve a "clearer progression from the ugly duckling to the ingenue", as per Marshall's request.

The film contains several references to Pretty Woman, another film directed by Marshall to which The Princess Diaries has often been compared. In addition to sharing a "Pygmalion-esque transformation story", both films share several cast members, including Elizondo and Miller. Most notably, actor Alan Kent, portraying a waiter, delivers the same line he once delivered to Julia Roberts' character in Pretty Woman during the scene in which Mia accidentally breaks a drinking glass.

=== Filming ===
==== Set and locations ====
The Princess Diaries was filmed on a budget of $26 million. Principal photography took place from September to December 2000, although filming had originally been scheduled to begin one month before the novel was published. It was filmed on Stage 2 at Walt Disney Studios in Burbank, California, the same sound stage where Mary Poppins starring Andrews had been filmed during the 1960s. The stage was later renamed the "Julie Andrews Stage" in honor of her work there. Additionally, Marshall resided in the same house Andrews herself had rented while filming Mary Poppins, having lived in the building since 1974. Exterior shooting in San Francisco lasted two and a half weeks. The former Engine Company No. 43 fire station on Brazil Avenue in the Excelsior District served as Mia and Helen's home, with its interior recreated in the studio. Mia's private school, Grove High School, was represented by Bob Lurie's recently vacated mansion and the rooftop of the Hamlin School. The cable car accident was filmed at Broadway and Taylor Streets. However, the beach party sequence was filmed in Malibu; the production designers decorated Zuma Beach to resemble San Francisco's Baker Beach. Mount St. Mary's College in Los Angeles, formerly the Edward L. Doheny Mansion, was used as the location for The Genovian Consulate.

To help Hathaway feel more comfortable on set, many of its props belonged to the actress' family. Mia's photograph of her late father is Hathaway's own father, Gerald Hathaway. Gerald also briefly portrays the character during a flashback in which he writes a letter to Mia. Mia's pet cat, Fat Louie, was portrayed by four different cats, one of whom was owned by Hathaway herself. Each cat served a specific purpose: one was trained to be carried, another could sit still for long periods, a third was used for jumping and stunts, and the last—Hathaway's—appears in the film's final scene. During the state dinner in which a guest's arm catches fire, the fire was intended to be extinguished once the actor placed his arm in a nearby ice bucket. However, when the fire persisted, Hathaway panicked and doused it with a glass of water, an improvisation that was kept in the film. Hathaway tripped and fell while filming a scene in which she is walking atop bleachers during the rain, but continued to recite her lines as though nothing had happened. Marshall found the unscripted incident funny and decided to retain it. Matarazzo identified this as her favorite moment while filming. While filming the final dance sequence, the crew played Madonna's "Like a Prayer" (1989) for the cast to dance to; multiple takes were required because the cast kept instinctively lip syncing its lyrics. The track was dubbed by a different song in the final edit.

==== Costume design ====
Costume designer Gary Jones, who had worked with Marshall on prior films, was drawn to The Princess Diaries due to the wide range of costumes required for its characters, describing the project as "a costume designer's dream come true". Jones worked closely with Andrews to design Clarisse's costumes, drawing inspiration from Chanel, Bill Blass, and Christian Dior. The gown Andrews wears to the state dinner was handmade in China, and is an homage to her role as My Fair Lady's Eliza Doolittle. Jones envisioned Mia as a character who is shy about her body at first, opting to dress her in layers consisting of long sleeves and loose-fitting garments. The character's periwinkle state dinner gown was inspired by Victoria, Crown Princess of Sweden, with Jones describing the dress as an homage to the Renaissance period and Romeo and Juliet, accessorizing it with an 18-carat diamond ring.

Both Hathaway and Andrews's tiaras were designed and custom-made for them, with the designers ensuring that both characters' crowns were appropriate for their age. The tiara and jewelry Andrews wears during the final scene of The Princess Diaries consists of half a million dollars’ worth of diamonds, loaned to the production by jeweler Harry Winston, with whom Jones worked closely to obtain several unique jewels. A security guard followed Andrews at all times to both protect her and ensure all jewelry was returned at the end of each day. Andrews's peach taffeta ballgown was accessorized with a 100-carat necklace comprising four rows of diamonds. Hathaway's tiara was considerably less expensive, consisting of cubic zirconia as opposed to authentic jewels. The crowns and tiaras worn by both actresses are preserved by the Walt Disney Archives, into which they were inducted in 2016 to commemorate the film's 15th anniversary.

Hathaway donned false eyebrows and a wig to make her character's makeover more dramatic. Hathaway's hair piece was nicknamed "The Beast", while her eyebrows required one hour to apply; each strand of hair was individually glued to her brow. At times Hathaway was required to leave the set in full costume, claiming that she "never felt so alone in [her] entire life".

== Themes ==
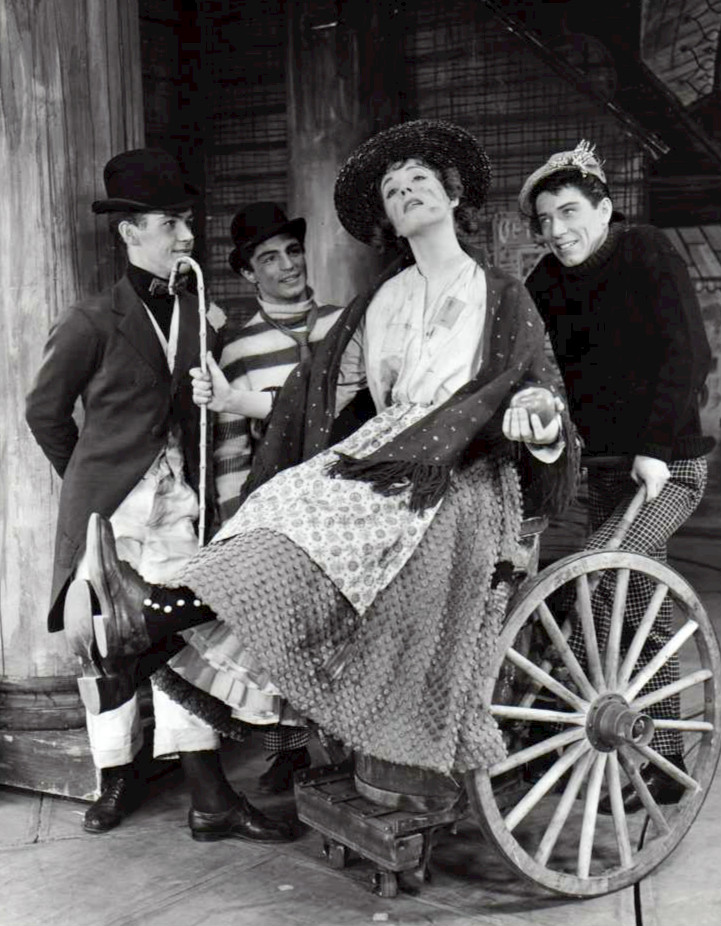
Due to its themes, The Princess Diaries has been heavily compared to the play Pygmalion; the play served as the basis for the 1956 stage musical My Fair Lady, in which Andrews played the main character Eliza Doolittle.

Andrews explained that the film is as much "about what you are inside and the responsibility and just plain old hard work that goes into being a princess" as it is "about the trappings of being a princess". Hathaway identified "remaining true to yourself" among the film's core values, describing Mia's transformation as both emotional and psychological, in addition to physical. Hathaway elaborated that, despite the makeover, her character most importantly learns that "life shouldn't be about what the rest of the world can do for her" but rather "doing everything in her power to help other people", emphasizing her emotional transformation over her physical one. Chase regards the plot as an "empowerment story", identifying "the power to be anything that you want to be" as its core message. Chase elaborated, "In the beginning, Mia looks in the mirror and doesn't think she's princess material at all" but ultimately "comes to believe that she is". Houston echoed that being a princess "doesn't mean they have to come from royalty" but rather "how you feel inside about yourself it's how you treat yourself and love yourself that really matters." Bustle contributor Veronica Walsingham wrote that the film explores feminism, identity, family, girlhood, and duty, believing that The Princess Diaries "is a feminist dream of fully developed female characters whose arcs aren't dependent on male characters", additionally passing the Bechdel test. A critic for Time Out wrote that the film discusses "responsibility, surrogacy, rites of passage and the value of friendship". Writers for USA Today noted that, despite being a comedy, the film contains deeper topics such as "familial bonds, self-worth and stepping out of your shell".

Most of Marshall's films revolve around themes "of recognizing and embracing one's own unique qualities and gifts". The Globe and Mail's Liam Lacey observed that the film adheres to a traditional fairy tale plot: "a fairy godmother, and the lowly girl who becomes a princess, complete with tiara, the dress and a plump frog to be transformed into Prince Charming". The Princess Diaries has been noted to contain some romantic comedy elements. The film has also drawn comparisons to Pygmalion, a play that provided the basis for the stage musical My Fair Lady, in which Andrews coincidentally played the role of Eliza Doolittle; Mia has been compared to Eliza. Identifying Pygmalion as "the model for all subsequent dramas about the recreation of social identity", The Guardian film critic Philip French cited The Princess Diaries as one of several "makeover drama[s]" inspired by the play. Similarly, HuffPost contributor Matthew recognized the film among several "recent approaches" to the Pygmalion story. Jacobs Kristal Brent Zook of The Washington Post wrote that Clarisse "must ... remake the gawky girl into a vision of regal grace" in "true Henry Higgins fashion", a character from My Fair Lady. The Seattle Times film critic Moira Macdonald joked that Andrews "play[s] Henry Higgins to young Anne Hathaway's Eliza". Also writing for The Washington Post, Michael O'Sullivan similarly observed that "Most of the comedy mileage comes from the My Fair Lady scenario, in which Mia's initially frumpy appearance and klutzy manner are eliminated through a regime of industrial-strength cosmetology and boot camp-style finishing school."

Nanciann Cherry, writing for The Blade, reviewed the film as "no more and no less than a live-action Cinderella, all dolled up for the 21st century". Amy Meadows, writing for The Tech, remarked that the film would hold few surprises for anyone who has seen Cinderella, My Fair Lady, or any other fairy tale. The film's main characters react differently towards Mia's physical transformation; Lilly fears that Mia will abandon her, Michael's attraction towards her only grows, and Lana feels threatened by Mia's royal lineage and sudden popularity within her own school. Some critics were concerned that the film's message might encourage younger viewers "that all awkward teens need do to find contentment is get a makeover and wait for a hitherto unknown royal grandmother to come lay a crown on their heads."

== Music ==
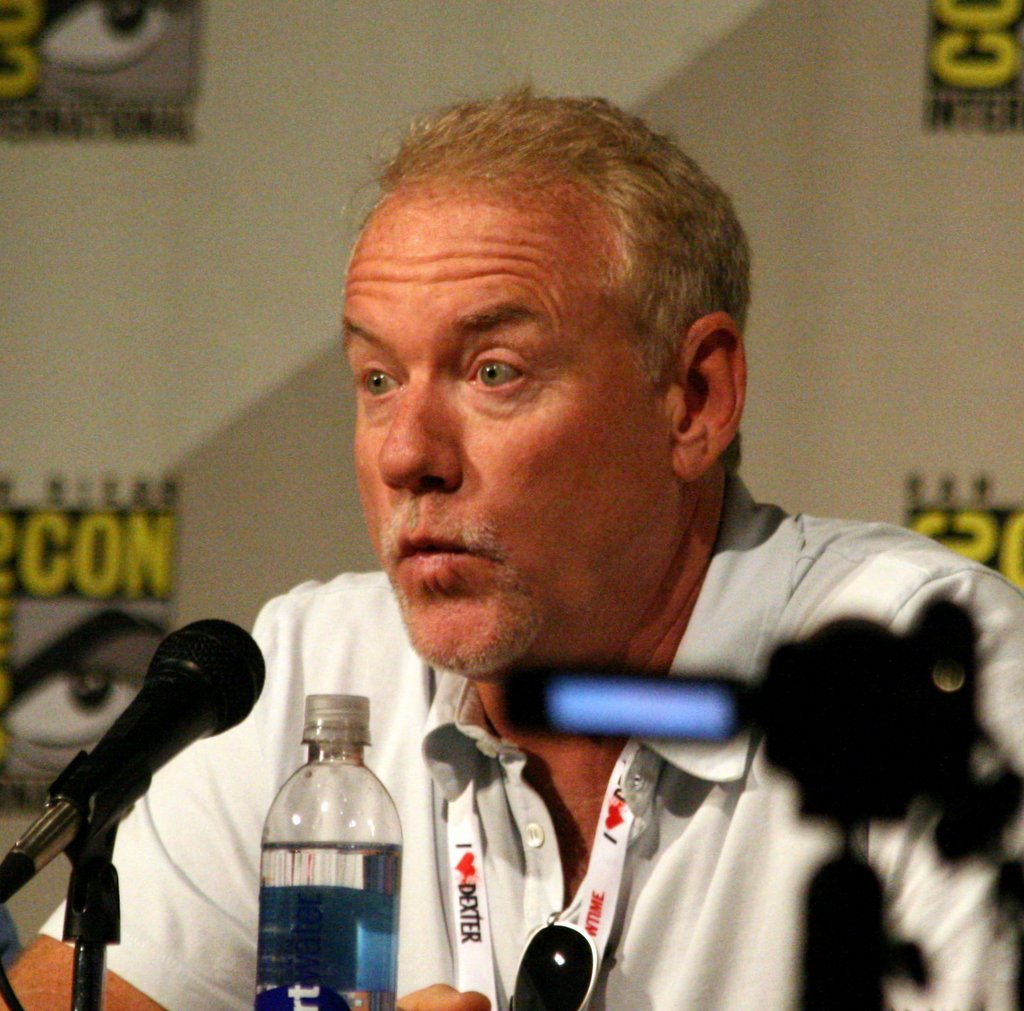
John Debney composed the film's score.

Houston and BrownHouse Productions were heavily involved in curating music for the film, which Kristal Brent Zook of The Washington Post observed "displays more girl power and ethnic flavor than the film does". Dawn Soler served as the film's music supervisor, and Moore recorded a cover of Connie Francis' "Stupid Cupid" for the soundtrack. Composer John Debney was recruited to score the film. Long-time friends with Disney executive Bill Green, Green felt that Debney would complement the film and personally recommended him to Marshall. Debney identified The Princess Diaries as one of the films he is most proud to have worked on, explaining that the project holds an "emotional connection" because it reminds him of his mother.

The official soundtrack was released by Walt Disney Records on July 24, 2001. Described as largely a collection of pop rock, teen pop, and dance-pop tracks, the soundtrack features contributions from artists BBMak, Aaron Carter, Backstreet Boys, Myra, Hanson and B*Witched. AllMusic's Heather Phares reviewed that the album consists of mostly "slick, virtually interchangeable singles ... a few tracks, for better or worse, are particularly distinctive", and felt that the album could have benefited from more originality as the Backstreet Boys' track "What Makes You Different (Makes You Beautiful)" implies. A soundtrack consisting exclusively of the film's orchestral score was released on December 11, 2001, credited to Debney.

== Release ==
Disney attempted to market the film cleverly to dispel the stigma associated with G-rated films at the time. The Princess Diaries premiered on July 29, 2001, at the El Capitan Theatre. Prior to introducing the film, Marshall encouraged audience members to chant "G is a good rating", deliberately referencing the lack of G-rated films released that year. A princess-themed tea party was hosted following the screening, with cast members Andrews, Hathaway, Matarazzo, Moore, Goodall, Schwartzman, Von Detten and Burbano attending. In addition to Jacobson, Disney executives Bob Iger, Richard Cook, Mark Vahradian, Chuck Viane and Oren Aviv were present, as well as actors Spencer Treat Clark, David Hasselhoff, Jennifer Love Hewitt and Michelle Trachtenberg. Additionally, the tea party featured appearances by actors portraying well-known Disney Princesses, including Snow White, Cinderella, Aurora and Belle.

Disney postponed the release of The Other Side of Heaven, which Hathaway had filmed before The Princess Diaries, to allow the latter film to take precedence at the box office, feeling confident that The Princess Diaries' impending success would in turn bolster the performance of The Other Side of Heaven. The Princess Diaries was released in theaters on August 3, 2001, becoming a surprise success and sleeper hit. The film opened in 2,537 theaters throughout North America and earned more than $23.2 million during its opening weekend, completing in third place behind Rush Hour 2 and Planet of the Apes. The Princess Diaries achieved the second-highest opening earnings for a live-action G-rated film, behind 101 Dalmatians (1996) at $33.5 million. The film's box office returns surprised several commentators, far exceeding pundits' expectations. Analysts originally estimated that the film would earn between $13 and $15 million.

The Princess Diaries was the only G-rated film released during summer 2001. According to Breuse Hickman of The Honolulu Advertiser, the last live-action film to earn a G rating prior to The Princess Diaries was Disney's 101 Dalmatians in 1996, a live-action remake of their own 1961 animated film of the same name. ABC News believes that the comedy's strong opening numbers benefited from it being one of 2001's few G-rated releases amidst several of PG-13-and R-rated films, to which parents reportedly rushed to see with their children, while Allen Wan of MarketWatch joked that the family friendly rating "didn't scare off mature audiences". However, The Dove Foundation argued that family fare such as The Princess Diaries is typically 11 times more profitable than adult-oriented films, although 12 times as many R-rated films were released between 1989 and 2003. Dove Foundation CEO Dick Rolfe received the film's release as "an experiment to test the waters to see if there is a market for truly wholesome family entertainment at the theaters". The Princess Diaries ultimately grossed $165.3 million worldwide, collecting $108.2 million in the United States and Canada, and $57.1 million in other territories. The film's box office returns were deemed remarkably high considering the fact that its lead role was played by a newcomer. The film ranks among the highest-grossing and most profitable of 2001.

To commemorate the film's 10th anniversary in April 2012, the film was released on Blu-ray to coincide with Disney's National Princess Week and the release of Andrews's book The Very Fairy Princess: Here Comes The Flower Girl!. A double-disk paired with The Princess Diaries 2: Royal Engagement, the release was sold exclusively at Target.

=== Critical response ===
The Princess Diaries received mixed reviews from film critics upon release. Review aggregator Rotten Tomatoes reports that 50% of 120 critics surveyed reviewed the film positively, with an average rating of 5.9/10. The website's critical consensus reads, "A charming, if familiar, makeover movie for young teenage girls". Metacritic assigned the film a weighted score of 52 based on 27 reviews, indicating "mixed or average reviews". Audiences polled by CinemaScore gave the film an average grade of "A" on an A+ to F scale.

Ed Park, writing for The Village Voice, reviewed the film as "a modest, enjoyable fairy tale that easily outcharms its animated stablemates of the past decade", the success of which he attributed to Hathaway and Andrews' performances. Calling The Princess Diaries "an ideal family film", Kevin Thomas of the Los Angeles Times commended Marshall's ability to "mak[e] make-believe seem real" while describing Wendkos' screenplay as "skillfully adapted" and praising Andrews's performance. Film critic Lisa Schwarzbaum commended Marshall for directing the film and its large cast "with avuncular affection and, by his standards, a minimum of court jestering", highlighting Andrews and Oh's contributions.

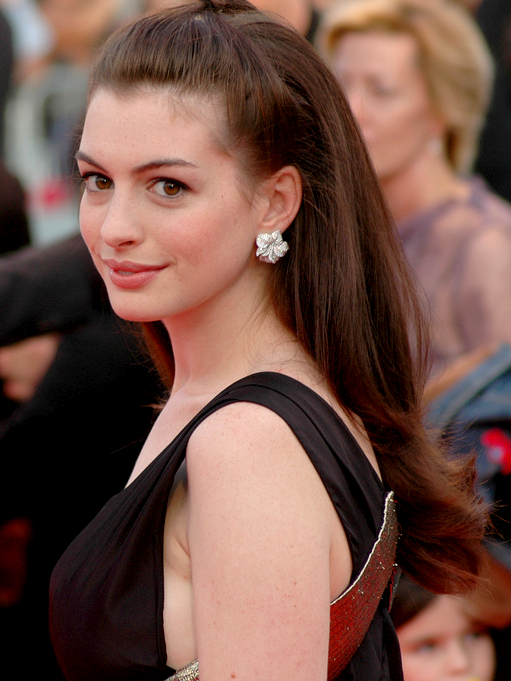
Anne Hathaway's performance (her first film role) was acclaimed by critics, who cited her comic timing as an asset to the film.

Film critic Mick LaSalle declared The Princess Diaries Marshall's best film and Andrews' finest work in years. The Washington Post's Michael O'Sullivan said the film has enough material to entertain older audiences, despite its target demographic. Robert Koehler of Variety and The Globe and Mail's Liam Lacey criticized the film for squandering the book's comedic potential by focusing on Mia's school and romantic relationships at the expense of her grandmother's training, but considered Andrews perfectly cast. Loren King of the Chicago Tribune praised the cast's chemistry and Andrews' performance in particular. Branding the film "a surprisingly sophisticated comedy" that avoids common teen tropes, Asher Price of The Denver Post enjoyed the training sequences but found the impact Mia's physical transformation has on her confidence disturbing.

Hathaway's performance was lauded, as was her chemistry with Andrews. LaSalle said, "Hathaway is not a natural comic, but her acting has a truthfulness that gives The Princess Diaries its emotional core", and compared her to Audrey Hepburn. Asher Price, reviewing for The Denver Post, praised Andrews' contribution while calling Hathaway "a good match for" the veteran actress. Elvis Mitchell, film critic for The New York Times, found the film "blandly reassuring" but dubbed Hathaway "royalty in the making" and "a young comic talent". However, Mitchell felt that Mia becomes less interesting post-makeover, a sequence he expected would offend some viewers. Similarly, The Seattle Times' Moira Macdonald found Mia's "teen-queen makeover" superfluous, but said Andrews "tucks the film into her carpet bag and walks away with it", dubbing her "pure screen royalty". Even most of the film's detractors praised Hathaway's work; Christine Dolen of the Miami Herald felt the script "leaves much to be desired" outside of Hathaway's comic timing. Several critics compared her to Julia Roberts.

In negative reviews, James Berardinelli accused Marshall of exploring a predictable plot "in a thoroughly uninteresting way" by reducing its main characters to stereotypes. Film critic Roger Ebert dismissed The Princess Diaries as a predictable, poorly edited "swamp of recycled ugly duckling stories, with occasional pauses in the marsh of sitcom cliches and the bog of Idiot Plots". Stephanie Zacharek reviewed the film as "aggressively bland and inoffensive" to the point where "it practically recedes from the screen". Zacharek is also one of the few film critics to deride the leads' performances, dismissing Andrews as "so shellacked and precise ... that it makes you want to run out of the theater and roll around in the dirt".

=== Accolades ===
The Princess Diaries won the Young Artist Award for Best Family Feature Film - Comedy. Debney's score won the ASCAP Award for Top Box Office Film, one of three awards the composer received at the 17th Film and Television Music Awards ceremony. Myra's song "Miracles Happen (When You Believe)" received an ALMA Award nomination for Outstanding Song in a Motion Picture Soundtrack. Casting directors Marcia Ross, Donna Morong and Gail Goldberg were nominated for an Artios Award for Feature Film Casting – Comedy.

At the Broadcast Film Critics Association Awards, The Princess Diaries was nominated for Best Family Film - Live Action. The film's trailer was nominated for a Golden Trailer Award for Best Animation/Family. Makeup artists Hallie D'Amore and Leonard Engelma were nominated for a Hollywood Makeup Artist Hair Stylist Guild Award for Best Contemporary Makeup - Feature. Hathaway received an MTV Movie Award nomination for Breakthrough Female Performance. The Princess Diaries was nominated for two Teen Choice Awards: Choice Movie: Actress, Comedy for Hathaway and Choice Movie: Comedy.

=== Home media ===
The film was released on DVD and VHS on December 18, 2001. The film was re-release in double DVD on August 3, 2004. The film was released as part of a Blu-ray and DVD double feature with The Princess Diaries 2: Royal Engagement on May 15, 2012.

== Sequel ==
A sequel, The Princess Diaries 2: Royal Engagement, was released on August 11, 2004, with Marshall returning to direct, Debra Martin Chase and Whitney Houston producing, and Hathaway, Andrews, Elizondo, Matarazzo, and Miller reprising their roles alongside John Rhys-Davies, Chris Pine and Callum Blue as new characters. There had been constant speculation about whether or not a third film would be released for several years. Several cast members had expressed interest in returning for a third installment, particularly Hathaway and Andrews. In 2016, Marshall revealed that he had discussed the possibility of having a third film set in New York with both actresses. Interest had bolstered following Marshall's death in 2016, with Cabot revealing that a script for the third film already existed, indicating that the threequel would most likely be a tribute to Marshall.

In January 2019, Hathaway confirmed there was a script being written for a third film and that she, Andrews, and producer Chase are on board. However, Andrews said in a June 2022 interview that she felt a third film would be unlikely and too late, especially since Marshall had already died.

On November 15, 2022, it was reported that Aadrita Mukerji was writing a script for a third Princess Diaries film, as a continuation of the previous films. Neither Hathaway nor Andrews had been confirmed to return. In October 2024, Adele Lim was announced as director of a second sequel, The Princess Diaries 3, with Hathaway set to return and produce.

== Legacy ==
Elite Daily contributor Alana Altmann described the film as "a bonafide fave of '90s and 2000s kids alike". Writing for the same publication, Kristen Perrone called the film "an essential part of the childhoods of anyone who grew up in the early 2000s". Andrews attributes the film's longevity to new generations re-discovering it approximately every seven years. The actress believes the film continues to resonate with audiences due to its strong morals about responsibility, obligation, decency, growing up, and self-discovery. Seventeen ranked The Princess Diaries the 10th best "Best Teen Movies You Can't Grow Up Without Watching". The scene in which Mia undergoes a physical makeover is one of the most famous from the film, with several media publications ranking it among the greatest makeover sequences in film history. E! contributor McKenna Aiello identified the montage as "the first scene that comes to mind" when remembering The Princess Diaries, a sentiment with which InStyle agreed. Lauren Hubbard, writing for Allure, believes the film "may very well be one of the single greatest makeover movies of our generation", publishing a list of "11 Beauty Lessons We Learned from The Princess Diaries". Cosmopolitan's Eliza Thompson wrote "Few makeover movies hold up as well as The Princess Diaries". Katie Rosseinsky of Grazia credits the film with introducing "one of the best makeover sequences in teen movie history" while teaching "excellent life lessons". Ranking it second, Her Campus hailed the scene as "the best teenage makeover ever". Total Beauty ranked the montage ninth, dubbing it the "Best Hair Movie Makeover".

Bustle writer Veronica Walsingham believes The Princess Diaries' makeover sequence distinguishes itself from similar scenes because Mia undergoes a complete physical transformation, avoiding the trope of simply removing her glasses. The Ringer placed the scene seventh on its "definitive" movie makeover ranking. The sequence's popularity has resulted in makeover films becoming something of a trademark genre for Hathaway, whose characters have undergone similar transformations in Ella Enchanted (2004), The Devil Wears Prada (2006), and Les Misérables (2012). Some media publications crowned Hathaway the "queen of makeover movies". In her AllMovie biography of Hathaway, Rebecca Flint Marx said the actress "became a familiar face to millions of moviegoers" by proving her comedic timing in The Princess Diaries, in turn opening "a number of doors" for herself as a leading lady. Hathaway initially suffered from being typecast in "good girl" roles after the film's success, which inspired her to pursue a variety of more serious, non-princess roles in subsequent years. In 2018, Marie Claire ranked The Princess Diaries Hathaway's second best film performance. The website NewNowNext credits The Princess Diaries with beginning to establish Hathaway as a gay icon, comparing her debut as a "reluctant princess" to that of actress Audrey Hepburn in Roman Holiday (1953). The film is credited with reviving Andrews's film career and introducing her to a younger generation of fans, rivaling her career-defining performances in Mary Poppins and The Sound of Music (1965) in terms of popularity. The film's popularity is also credited with evolving Cabot from an author into a celebrity. Cabot remarked that the novels had actually been intended for slightly older readers, but parents who saw the G-rated film would purchase the books for their 6-7-year-old children, unintentionally exposing them to teen content.

The Princess Diaries is the work for which Marshall is best remembered among millennials. When Marshall died in July 2016, several cast members paid tribute to the late director online. Following Marshall's death, The Daily Telegraph film critic Robbie Collin wrote that The Princess Diaries is "by no means a flawless movie", but rather "one from which a star was able to bounce out, eyes bright, teeth flashing and primed for adoration. Marshall’s films may never have made him a critical darling, but his best work thrived on smile power – on both the faces of his audience and cast." When the film was released on Netflix in 2018, the streaming service tweeted their surprise at the revelation that Houston served as a producer on the film, inspiring several Twitter users to comment the same. The film's popularity among audiences has since defied expectations initially indicated by its lukewarm reception nearly two decades after its release. Observing that the film experienced a renaissance in 2018, Walsingham credits the film's resurgence to its release on Netflix and American actress Meghan Markle's marriage to Prince Harry, whose narrative has been compared to Mia's role in The Princess Diaries in the media, particularly the fact that Markle underwent "duchess training" for the title.
