= The Princess Diaries 2: Royal Engagement =

2004 film by Garry Marshall

- Theatrical release poster
- Directed by: Garry Marshall
- Screenplay by: Shonda Rhimes
- Story by: Shonda Rhimes; Gina Wendkos
- Based on: Characters by Meg Cabot
- Produced by: Whitney Houston; Debra Martin Chase
- Starring: Anne Hathaway; Heather Matarazzo; John Rhys-Davies; Héctor Elizondo; Julie Andrews
- Cinematography: Charles Minsky
- Edited by: Bruce Green
- Music by: John Debney
- Production companies: Walt Disney Pictures; BrownHouse Productions; Martin Chase Productions
- Distributed by: Buena Vista Pictures Distribution
- Release date: August 11, 2004
- Running time: 113 minutes
- Country: United States
- Language: English
- Budget: $45 million
- Box office: $135.3 million

The Princess Diaries 2: Royal Engagement is a 2004 American romantic comedy film directed by Garry Marshall and written by Shonda Rhimes. Produced by Walt Disney Pictures, it is the sequel to 2001's The Princess Diaries. Unlike the first film, it is not based on any existing book, and has no relation to the second installment in the book series, The Princess Diaries, Volume II: Princess in the Spotlight. In the film, Mia Thermopolis learns that before she can succeed her grandmother as queen of Genovia, she must marry or else relinquish the throne.

Most of the cast returned from the first film, including Anne Hathaway, Julie Andrews, Héctor Elizondo, Heather Matarazzo, and Larry Miller. Garry Marshall returned to direct and Debra Martin Chase and Whitney Houston to produce. New characters include Viscount Mabrey (John Rhys-Davies), Lord Nicholas Devereaux (Chris Pine, in his feature film debut), and Andrew Jacoby (Callum Blue).

The film grossed $135.3 million worldwide and received mixed reviews from critics. As of 2024, a sequel is in development, with Adele Lim attached as director.

== Plot ==
Five years after first learning she was a princess, Mia has returned to Genovia to assume the position of queen only to discover that a male heir exists, Lord Nicholas Deveraux, the nephew of the scheming Viscount Mabrey. In order to inherit the throne, Mia must marry within the month, so she enters into an engagement with Andrew Jacoby, Duke of Kenilworth. Unwilling to accept this, Mabrey instructs Nicholas to seduce Mia so the engagement will fail.

Nicholas begins to seduce Mia and the two begin to fall in love, something that is witnessed by both Mabrey as well as Mia's grandmother, Queen Clarisse. Nicholas realizes that Mia would make an excellent queen and is more deserving of the throne than himself or his uncle. Aware that this would derail his plans, Mabrey manipulates Nicholas into believing that his father wanted Nicholas to become king. Two days before the wedding, Nicholas convinces Mia to sneak out and join him for a night of fun. The next morning, they awaken to find a man filming them, causing Mia to angrily accuse Nicholas of setting her up and leave. The footage is widely shared, prompting Andrew to realize that there is no romantic spark between him and Mia. The two decide to marry anyway the following day, for the good of Genovia.

Just before the wedding, Mia learns that Nicholas was innocent and that the scandal was set up by Mabrey. Knowing that she does not want to enter into a loveless marriage, Mia halts the ceremony and runs out of the church. She is followed by Clarisse, who encourages her to follow her heart, something she never did, costing her Joe, the love of her life. Mia returns to the church and asks the members of Parliament to abolish the law on royal marriages, asking if they would force the significant women in their lives to marry without love. Despite protestations from Mabrey, Parliament unanimously assents. Clarisse proposes to Joe, and they are promptly married.

A week later, Mia is preparing for her coronation when Nicholas arrives. He professes his love on bended knees, and they kiss. The next day, Clarisse steps down, and Mia is crowned "Her Majesty Amelia Mignonette Thermopolis Renaldi, Queen of Genovia.”

An epilogue shows that the Genovian Parliament now allows female members, one of whom is Charlotte (Clarisse's lady-in-waiting). Queen Mia officially opens a new children's home with Carolina, an orphan she had helped earlier in the film.

== Cast ==
- Anne Hathaway as Mia Thermopolis
- Julie Andrews as Queen Clarisse Renaldi
- Héctor Elizondo as Joe
- John Rhys-Davies as Viscount Mabrey
- Heather Matarazzo as Lilly Moscovitz
- Chris Pine as Nicholas Devereaux
- Callum Blue as Andrew Jacoby
- Kathleen Marshall as Charlotte Kutaway
- Tom Poston as Lord Palimore
- Joel McCrary as Prime Minister Motaz
- Kim Thomson as Reporter Elsie Penworthy
- Raven-Symoné as Princess Asana, (credited as Raven)
- Larry Miller as Paolo
- Caroline Goodall as Helen Thermopolis
- Sean O'Bryan as Patrick O'Connell
- Matthew Walker as Captain Kip Kelly
- Shea Curry as Brigitte
- Anna A. White as Brigitta
- Anna Netrebko as herself
- Spencer Breslin as Prince Jacques Dubé
- Isabella Hoffman as Miss Genovia Hildegard
- Abigail Breslin as Carolina
- Fat Louie as himself, Mia's cat
- Maurice as himself, Clarisse's poodle

== Production ==
The film's writer, Shonda Rhimes, said that she treasured the experience if for nothing else – the opportunity to work with its star, Julie Andrews. Rhimes had previously interned for producer Debra Martin Chase. Her earlier writing credits included Introducing Dorothy Dandridge (1999) and Crossroads (2002), after which Chase offered her the opportunity to write The Princess Diaries 2: Royal Engagement. Having enjoyed the original film, Rhimes accepted; she also described herself as a devoted fan of Julie Andrews. Regarding the sequel's premise, Rhimes pitched and discussed several ideas with Chase. In retrospect, Rhimes said it was foolish to promise to deliver the script one month after her due date, only realizing how difficult it would be after her child was born; nevertheless, she persisted.

Director Garry Marshall instructed Rhimes to write a slumber party sequence featuring mattress surfing, which she initially felt had little to do with the story she was writing. Although she does not take sole credit for the mattress surfing sequence, Rhimes acknowledged that Marshall taught her that deviating from the plot can sometimes be beneficial in creating memorable moments. The PowerPoint sequence in which Mia, Clarisse, and Lilly review eligible bachelors was inspired by Rhimes requiring her daughter, Harper, to create PowerPoint presentations when she wanted something.

Andrews was later cast as the voice of Lady Whistledown in Rhimes' 2020 series, Bridgerton.

== Reception ==
=== Box office ===
The film opened in 3,472 theaters in North America and grossed $23 million in its opening weekend. It grossed $134.7 million worldwide—$95.2 million in North America and $39.6 million in other territories for a worldwide total of $135.3 million.

=== Critical response ===
On review aggregator Rotten Tomatoes 25% of 119 critic reviews are positive, with an average rating is 4.6/10. The site's critical consensus is that "Anne Hathaway and Julie Andrews bring charm and elegance to the movie, but there's not enough material for them to work with in this sequel." On Metacritic, the film has a weighted average score of 43/100 from the 31 reviews, indicating "mixed or average" reception.

== Soundtrack ==
The song, "Your Crowning Glory", a duet between Queen Clarisse (Julie Andrews) and Princess Asana (Raven-Symoné) was the first time Andrews had sung in public or on screen since she had throat surgery in 1997.

== Home media ==
The film was released on DVD and VHS on December 14, 2004.

== Sequel ==
In March 2016, Garry Marshall announced plans for a third Princess Diaries film, with Hathaway reprising her role. When Marshall died in July 2016, the project was shelved. In August of the same year, Hector Elizondo discussed the development of the third installment stating, "I know Anne would like to do it. I know Julie would like to do it. I would like to do it. So we're on board, it's a question of when and a question of getting a good story. I'm ready! It's time to go back to Genovia!"

In May 2018, Anne Hathaway stated that she would still like to appear in a third Princess Diaries film. By January 2019, she confirmed that a script was completed, that she and Andrews were on board to co-star in the film, and that producer Debra Martin Chase would return. She further stated that the film would not enter production until "it's perfect."

On November 15, 2022, it was revealed that Disney was moving forward with a third Princess Diaries film. Though not confirmed to appear, the company is reportedly interested in bringing Hathaway back. The following month, Andrews said that she did not see herself returning for a third film. In April 2024, Hathaway revealed that development talks surrounding the sequel were "in a good place" but that there were no further announcements to be made yet. In October 2024, Adele Lim had signed on as the film's director and Hathaway announced she will reprise the role of Mia.

By July 19, 2026, Hathaway said, “I’m busy making baby No. 3,” adding that there had been “a story breakthrough” regarding Princess Diaries 3 and that the team was moving in the right direction with a new script. On August 11, 2026, it was confirmed that Julie Andrews would not reprise her role as Clarisse Renaldi for the third film.
