= The Princess Diaries, Volume VII: Party Princess =

2006 YA novel by Meg Cabot

- First edition cover
- Author: Meg Cabot
- Language: English
- Series: The Princess Diaries
- Genre: Young adult novel
- Publisher: HarperCollins
- Publication date: April 2006
- Publication place: United States
- Media type: Print (Hardback & Paperback)
- Pages: 306
- ISBN: 0-06-072453-6 (first edition, hardback)
- OCLC: 63807489
- LC Class: PZ7.C11165 Par 2006
- Preceded by: The Princess Diaries, Volume VI and 1/2: The Princess Present
- Followed by: The Princess Diaries, Volume VII and 1/2: Sweet Sixteen Princess

The Princess Diaries, Volume VII: Party Princess, released in the United Kingdom as The Princess Diaries: Seventh Heaven, is a young adult book in the Princess Diaries series. Written by Meg Cabot, it was released in 2006 by Harper Collins Publishers and is the seventh novel in the series.

== Publication history ==
The Princess Diaries, Volume VII: Party Princess was published on March 23, 2006, by HarperCollins. It is the seventh novel in The Princess Diaries series.

== Plot summary ==
When Mia Thermopolis bankrupts the student government buying high-tech recycling bins, she needs to raise $5,000 soon, so that she can pay for the seniors' commencement ceremony. All her friends (including her long-time boyfriend and so-called love of her life Michael Moscovitz) mention selling candles, but Mia absolutely refuses, so Grand-mère comes up with a solution: a musical, Braid! written and directed by Grand-mère, starring Mia and her friends, portraying the achievements of Mia's famous Genovian ancestor, Rosagunde. Mia is thrilled, yet quite worried to be cast as the lead. She attempts to drop out, but Grand-mère threatens to tell the seniors that Mia had bankrupted the student government (making them angry that she had not saved money for the commencement ceremony). Braid! also results in a new-found friendship between Mia and "The Guy Who Hates It When They Put Corn In The Chili", aka J.P. - Mia's on-stage love interest, who turns out to be an aspiring screenwriter.

Michael mentions his parents are going away for the weekend and he plans on having a party. Mia starts to worry she isn't enough of a party girl. She even (as a last resort, of course) asks her archenemy, Lana Weinberger, how to act like a "Party Girl". Mia does what Lana says and it all ends in tragedy. After she drinks and "sexy dances" with J.P., her relationship with Michael seems to be on rocky ground, especially as Michael's parents are splitting up and he is being an absent boyfriend. Her friendship with J.P. seems to be going the same way thanks to Lilly's new literary magazine, "Fat Louie's Pink Butthole", which includes "No More Corn!" a story Mia wrote (before meeting him) about J.P. killing himself. However, Principal Gupta immediately bans the magazine and confiscates all the copies, as Lilly has submitted five explicit stories to it, meaning that J.P. never sees Mia's story.

Mia's friendship with Lilly also hits a rough patch after Mia kisses J.P. (on the cheek) as a sign of gratitude for being a supportive friend and Lilly (who clearly has a crush on J.P.) stops speaking to Mia.

The play is performed at the Aide de Ferme, a benefit for Genovian olive oil farmers that Grand-mère puts on. Everyone who is anyone attends, but, before the last scene, Mia is worried about her on-stage kiss with J.P. Then Michael shows up in J.P.'s costume and gives her a perfect kiss and they talk about their problems, and, once again, their relationship appears to be strong. Grand-mère also raises enough money to help the Genovian farmers and Mia, solving her problems.

== Style ==
Cheryl Stritzel McCarthy of The Plain Dealer found the book's comedy to be occasionally coarse and noted it includes a few subtle nods to sex. The Buffalo News's Jean Westmoore called the book "a hilarious yarn". She cited a statement from the main character, Mia Thermopolis, who said, "He's so old, he looks like a cross between Larry King and a raisin."

According to Kliatt reviewer Joanna Solomon, Party Princess is like its six predecessors. Unfolding over roughly two weeks, the novel features main character Mia who blows small problems out of proportion. Solomon called the book "a fast read" that paves the way for the following installment in the series.

== Reception ==
Cheryl Stritzel McCarthy of The Plain Dealer lauded the book for being "an upbeat, fun bit of chick lit for girls eighth grade and older". Kliatt reviewer Joanna Solomon said that Mia, the main character, "is still lovable and her hilarious diary entries couldn't be more enjoyable". In a mixed review, Cindy Welch of Booklist stated, "Mia's quandaries are less involving here than in previous books in the series, but readers will still enjoy this seventh cast reunion." Finding the book to be her top pick from the series, Rebecca Gieseker praised its "laugh-out-loud humor, wit, and unparallel creativity". Mary Ann Harlan, a Voice of Youth Advocates writer, reviewed the book.

== Audiobook adaptation ==
The audiobook adaptation of Party Princess was made by Listening Library and distributed by Listening Library and Books on Tape in 2006. Performed by Clea Lewis, the audiobook is six hours and five minutes long and takes up either four cassette tapes or five CDs. Stephanie A. Squicciarini, a reviewer for the School Library Journal, praised Lewis' delivery for animating Albert Einstein High School's near-melodramatic atmosphere and raw feeling. According to Squicciarini, Lewis adjusted her tempo and tone to match the shifts from varying character perspectives, conversations, diary writings, instant messages, and emails.

Carol Reich of Kliatt penned a positive review of Lewis' performance. Reich described Lewis' execution as "breezy and perky", bringing out the tale's "lightness and fun". The reviewer thought that her performance of the different characters amplify the lighthearted entertainment, citing "Grandmere's heavy French accent, Mia's dramatic delivery, and the laidback drawl of J.P."
