= The Princess Diaries (novel) =

2000 youth novel by Meg Cabot

- First edition
- Author: Meg Cabot
- Language: English
- Series: The Princess Diaries
- Genre: Young adult novel
- Publisher: HarperTrophy
- Publication date: 2000
- Publication place: United States
- English publication date: 30/05/2000
- Media type: Print (Hardback & Paperback)
- Pages: 240 pp
- ISBN: 0-06-029210-5
- OCLC: 47228587
- Followed by: The Princess Diaries, Volume II: Princess in the Spotlight

The Princess Diaries is the first volume of the series of the same name by Meg Cabot. It was released in 2000 by Harper Collins Publishers, and later became a film of the same name starring Anne Hathaway.

== Summary ==
Mia Thermopolis is an average urban ninth grader living in Greenwich Village with her single, liberal, and semi-famous painter mother, Helen Thermopolis. She begins keeping a journal after her mother begins dating her algebra teacher, Mr. Gianni, whose subject Mia is currently failing. Mia has a crush on Josh Richter, the boyfriend of popular cheerleader Lana Weinberger, who often makes fun of her, though she also unknowingly harbours feelings for Michael, the brother of her best friend Lilly Moscovitz.

Mia's father, Philippe Renaldo, who has recently recovered from testicular cancer, pays a visit. He reveals to Mia that he is the prince of Genovia, a small European principality. As he is no longer able to have children, Mia is now his sole heir to the throne and the princess of Genovia.

Mia refuses to move to Genovia so she and her father form a compromise; she will remain in New York with her mother during term-time but spend her holidays in Genovia and attend daily princess lessons with her formidable grandmother, the Dowager Princess Clarisse Renaldo. After Clarisse gives Mia a makeover, Lilly reacts negatively, causing Mia to befriend Tina Hakim Baba, the daughter of a Saudi Arabia oil sheik who is shunned at school due to the presence of her bodyguard.

Mia at first hides the truth of her royal status from her peers at school; however her secret is revealed after her grandmother sells the truth to the press, after which Philippe insists on her being accompanied by a bodyguard, Lars. Josh Richter breaks up with Lana and asks Mia to the Cultural Diversity Dance. Mia grows disillusioned with Josh during their date and realises he is only using her for the publicity after he deliberately kisses her in front of the paparazzi. After Mia confronts him, Lilly apologises to Mia and she and Tina encourage Mia to enjoy the rest of the dance with her friends, including Michael. Mr. Gianni informs Mia that she has managed to bring her Algebra grade up from an F to a D and Mia realises her feelings for Michael.

== Characters ==
- Mia Thermopolis: Describes herself as a five-foot nine, flat chested, freshman, freak; also known as Amelia Mignonette Grimaldi Thermopolis Renaldo, Princess of Genovia. Mia loves to write, has a tendency to obsess over everything that happens to her, is a vegetarian, identifies as a feminist and is currently failing algebra and many other subjects.
- Grandmere: Mia's grandmother, who loves Sidecars, is highly critical of everyone around her. She has a hairless poodle, Rommel, and she calls Michael Moscovitz that boy. Her full name is The Dowager Princess Clarisse Renaldo. Mia and her Grandmother don't get along with each other for most of the story.
- Lilly Moscovitz: Mia's bossy activist best friend, who has her own television cable show called Lilly Tells It Like It Is.
- Michael Moscovitz: Lilly's older brother, who is extremely smart and according to Mia, is attractive. Mia's crush. Later on in the series becoming Mia's boyfriend too.
- Lana Weinberger: Head cheerleader, initially Josh's girlfriend, dislikes Mia and puts her down throughout the book. Yet, near the very end of the series she is close friends with Mia.
- Josh Richter: Mia's very first crush in the series: "six feet of unadulterated hotness." Originally dating Lana at the beginning of the novel, he is shown to have manipulative tendencies.
- Helen Thermopolis: Mia's quirky painter mother, who surprises Mia by not only marrying, but having a child with her algebra teacher. She is described as irresponsible.
- Philippe Renaldo: Mia's royal father, who is the prince of Genovia. He had Mia out of wedlock, and is constantly annoyed by his domineering mother, has many girlfriends, and tells Mia that she is a princess after he is no longer able to have children because he had cancer.
- Tina Hakim-Baba: A girl whom Mia befriends throughout the novel. Her father is an oil man sheikh who is worried that she will get kidnapped. She originally is shunned because her overprotective father forces her to have a bodyguard (Wahim), but she and Mia quickly become close.
- Frank Gianini: Mia's algebra and homeroom teacher and he dates her mother, Helen. Mia grows to appreciate his after-school algebra review sessions, and though their relationship begins awkwardly, Mia and Mr. G seem to get along well.
- Lars: Mia's bodyguard. He follows her almost everywhere and lives in the Plaza. Has some serious blackmail on Mia, having followed her around everywhere.
- Fat Louie: Mia's very fat cat who is attracted to anything shiny and enjoys eating socks.

== Reception ==
The literary critic Sarah Rothschild describes the book as one example of offering "princesses as strong, positive role models for modern girls," and Imelda Whelehan describes Mia's character as an example of a challenge to traditional conceptions of the princess. In response to both writers, Hanna Liljeqvist has observed the overall ambiguity of the fictional diary as medium, which reinforces traditional methods of women's storytelling. Liljeqvist also observes that Mia's character slowly becomes more normative over the course of the series, and that "the empowering potential of Mia’s feminine narration is somewhat ruined by its reliance on male approval as one of the main ways of challenging Mia’s (mis)conceptions of herself".

== Film adaptation ==
The first novel was adapted into the 2001 teen comedy film The Princess Diaries, produced by Walt Disney Pictures and directed by Garry Marshall. Anne Hathaway stars as Mia Thermopolis with Julie Andrews portraying Queen Clarisse Renaldi. While the film preserves Mia’s essential character traits, it diverges from the novel in several ways: Mia is 15 years old, drives a 1965 Mustang, and lives in San Francisco. The royal family's last name is changed from Renaldo to Renaldi. Most notably, her father has recently died and does not appear in the film. The film was a major box office success and has been credited with boosting the popularity of Cabot’s book series.
