= The Princess Diaries, Volume III: Princess in Love =

2001 novel by Meg Cabot

The Princess Diaries Volume III: Princess in Love
- Author: Meg Cabot
- Language: English
- Series: The Princess Diaries
- Genre: Young adult novel
- Publisher: HarperCollins
- Publication date: 2001
- Publication place: United States
- Media type: Print (Hardcover & Paperback)
- Pages: 240 pp (first edition, hardback)
- ISBN: 978-0-06-029467-0 (first edition, hardback)
- OCLC: 48013816
- LC Class: PZ7.C11165 Ps 2002
- Preceded by: The Princess Diaries, Volume II: Princess in the Spotlight
- Followed by: The Princess Diaries, Volume IV: Princess in Waiting

The Princess Diaries Volume III: Princess in Love (released in the United Kingdom as Princess Diaries: Third Time Lucky) is a young adult book in the Princess Diaries series. Written by Meg Cabot, it was released in 2001 by Harper Collins Publishers and is the third book in the series.

== Plot ==
In this volume, Mia struggles to decide how to break up with her boyfriend Kenny. In The Princess Diaries, Volume II: Princess in the Spotlight Kenny, Mia's biology partner at school, sent anonymous love letters to Mia expressing his feelings for her, resulting in Mia and Kenny dating. Mia does not love Kenny, but cannot bring herself to break up with him. Mia likes Michael, her friend Lilly's older brother, and feels she is leading Kenny on.

Mia also deals with her end-of-term exams, and preparation for her royal debut in Genovia over Christmas break, including dress fittings with her distant relative and dress designer Sebastiano. When Lilly’s English teacher shoots down Lilly’s paper proposal for her English final, Lilly organises a school-wide walkout of class as a protest against authority. Not wanting to upset Mr. Gianni, Mia pulls the fire alarm at the time the walkout is scheduled to happen, though nobody finds out it was her. After Grand-mère and Sebastino publish a set of photos of Mia modelling different gowns without her or her parents' consent, Mia organises a press conference donating all the proceeds from the sales of the dresses she modelled to Greenpeace.

Mia begins to send Michael anonymous love letters, similar to that of Kenny's. Unknown to her, Mia's friend Tina, whom Mia confided in about the letters, has told Lilly about said letters. Lilly eventually tells Michael that it was Mia sending the letters. At the school Winter Carnival, Michael shows her a message on his computer revealing he knows she sent the love letters, and he returns her feelings.

Mia, not knowing how to respond and thinking Michael may be playing a joke on her, runs from her chair. Mia runs into Kenny, who mistakenly believes Mia is in love with Boris, and they break up. Mia returns home, is devastated and does not want to go to the dance following the carnival, and decides to move to Genovia. Mia's grandmother convinces her to go to the dance, where Mia sees Michael, and they share their first kiss together.

== Reception ==
Kirkus Reviews highlighted Cabot's skill in writing Mia's diaries "in perfect teenage vernacular". Similarly, while reviewing the audiobook, AudioFile praised Anne Hathaway's ability to portray Mia "in such a genuine manner".
