= The Princess Diaries, Volume IV: Princess in Waiting =

2003 YA novel by Meg Cabot

The Princess Diaries Volume IV: Princess in Waiting
- First edition cover
- Author: Meg Cabot
- Language: English
- Series: The Princess Diaries
- Genre: Young adult novel
- Publisher: Harper Collins Publishers
- Publication date: 2003
- Publication place: United States
- Media type: Print (Hardback & Paperback)
- Pages: 240 pp (first edition, hardback)
- ISBN: 0-06-009607-1 (first edition, hardback)
- OCLC: 50920686
- LC Class: PZ7.C11165 Pu 2003
- Preceded by: The Princess Diaries, Volume III: Princess in Love
- Followed by: The Princess Diaries, Volume V: Princess in Pink

The Princess Diaries, Volume IV: Princess in Waiting, released in the United Kingdom as The Princess Diaries: Mia Goes Forth, is a young adult book in the Princess Diaries series. Written by Meg Cabot, it was published in 2003 by Harper Collins Publishers and is the fourth book in the series.

== Plot ==
Now having made her debut as the country's heir presumptive, Mia Thermopolis spends her winter break in Genovia, performing her royal duties at functions of state with her father, grandmother and Prince Rene, a royal descendant of a now non-existent principality. She remains in touch with her friends Tina, Lilly and Michael, who confirmed his reciprocated feelings for Mia in the previous book, but begins to second guess their relationship status.

After a conversation with Tina, who tells Mia not to be too forthright with her feelings due to her own boyfriend Dave reacting badly, Mia searches for a gift for Michael's birthday. Grandmere, who disapproves of Mia's relationship with Michael, advises Mia to play hard-to-get and tries to set her up repeatedly with Rene. On her return to New York, Mia's mother cautions her that distancing herself from Michael will only damage their relationship, which is proven correct when Dave dumps Tina for giving him the silent treatment.

Despite Michael asserting their romantic relationship, Mia's insecurities are fuelled by her seeming to have no special talent, unlike the rest of her peers in Gifted and Talented. Lilly assures Mia she has a talent but refuses to tell her what it is.

When Mia is forced to cancel her and Michael's first movie date due to having to attend a black-and-white ball hosted by a rival of Grandmere's, she convinces herself that Michael is going to dump her. Mia leaves the ball early and finds Michael has instead arranged the movie date for them at his house. He assures Mia he is not considering dumping her and helps her realise she has a talent in writing. Mia finally gives Michael his late birthday present; a rock from the moon collected by Neil Armstrong gifted to Genovia by Richard Nixon, which she smuggled from the Genovian palace.

== Reception ==
On behalf of The Barnes & Noble Review, Beth Amos referred to Princess in Waiting as "hilarious", noting that "Mia's self-deprecating wit, self-absorption, and adolescent angst are as entertaining as ever as she struggles with the realization that despite being a princess, she isn't guaranteed any fairy-tale endings." Kirkus Reviews also mentioned that the novel "is as hilarious and enjoyable as its predecessors". However, Amos noted that "while Mia's sometimes simplistic view of life remains intact and her adolescent shallowness is often apparent, she also shows an evolving maturity as she prepares for her royal role under Grand-mère's overbearing guidance."

Kirkus Reviews also discussed the novel's format, written as a teenager's diary, which "lets the reader follow each twist-and-turn from Mia's point of view, with plenty of asides on current media events". While they considered these asides "fun", they also thought the references "will date quickly", with some readers already missing some of them at the time of the book's publication.

Booklist also reviewed the audiobook narrated by Clea Lewis.
