= Heather Matarazzo =

American actress (born 1982)

- Matarazzo in 2023
- Born: November 10, 1982 (age 44); Oyster Bay, New York, U.S.
- Citizenship: United States; Republic of Ireland
- Occupation: Actress
- Years active: 1993–present
- Spouse: Heather Turman (m. 2018)
- Partner: Caroline Murphy (2004–2012)
- Website: heather-matarazzo.com

Heather Matarazzo (born November 10, 1982) is an American actress. She made her film debut at age 12 in Welcome to the Dollhouse (1995), for which she won an Independent Spirit Award. She became known for playing Lilly Moscovitz in The Princess Diaries (2001) and its 2004 sequel, and Martha Meeks in Scream 3 (2000) and Scream (2022). Her other credits include The Devil's Advocate (1997), All I Wanna Do (1998), 54 (1998), Sorority Boys (2002), Saved! (2004) and Sisters (2015).

Outside film, Matarazzo portrayed Heather Wiseman on the CBS series Now and Again (1999–2000), and had recurring roles on Roseanne (1997), Exes & Ohs (2006–2009), and The L Word (2007). On stage, she appeared in the 2001–2002 Broadway revival of The Women.

== Early life ==
Matarazzo's biological mother was Irish-American, while her biological father was from Ireland, from the town of Knock (Irish: An Cnoc), County Mayo. She was adopted and raised by the Matarazzos, an Italian-American family. She was raised in Oyster Bay, New York.

== Career ==
Matarazzo began acting at the age of six; after commandeering the microphone at an AIDS benefit for children, she was given the card of a talent manager, with whom she remained for ten years.

In 1997, she won an Independent Spirit Award for her performance as adolescent social outcast Dawn Wiener in Welcome to the Dollhouse. Matarazzo has expressed pleasure in being allowed to play interesting characters, some of whom "are ostracized for various reasons." She has commented that she is most proud of her performance in 1999's Our Guys: Outrage in Glen Ridge, based on a true story, in which she played a mentally challenged girl who is raped by football players. In 1999 to 2000, she portrayed Heather Wiseman in the short-lived TV series, Now and Again. In 2001, she appeared in the teen romantic comedy film The Princess Diaries as Lilly Moscovitz and reprised her role in the 2004 sequel The Princess Diaries 2: Royal Engagement.

Matarazzo has made appearances on several hit TV shows including Roseanne, Law & Order, The L Word, Grey's Anatomy and Strangers With Candy. Matarazzo starred opposite Thaao Penghlis in the world premiere of Charles Evered's play Class at Cape May Stage in Cape May, New Jersey in May and June 2010.

In 2011, Matarazzo announced that she would begin working on her directorial debut, a television series to be based on a memoir by author Diane Hanks, titled Summer Camp: A Memoir.

== Personal life ==
In 2004, at the age of 21, Matarazzo came out as a lesbian in an article in the New York Daily News, and was subsequently profiled in an article in the October 2004 edition of The Advocate. On July 31, 2008, Matarazzo's publicist announced that Matarazzo was engaged to musician Caroline Murphy. In 2012, popular media news outlets announced that Matarazzo and Murphy had split amicably. Matarazzo married comedian Heather Turman in 2018.

Matarazzo endorsed and actively campaigned for Senator Bernie Sanders for President in the 2016 U.S. presidential election.

== Filmography ==
=== Film ===
| Year | Title | Role | Notes |
|---|---|---|---|
| 1995 | Welcome to the Dollhouse | Dawn Wiener | Independent Spirit Award for Best Debut Performance; Nominated—Satellite Award for Best Actress in a Motion Picture – Musical or Comedy; Nominated—Young Artist Award for Best Leading Young Actress in a Feature Film |
| 1997 | Hurricane Streets | Ashley | |
| 1997 | The Deli | Sabrina | |
| 1997 | The Devil's Advocate | Barbara | |
| 1997 | A Change Would Do You Good | The girl in the band | Mini movie/music video for Sheryl Crow |
| 1998 | 54 | Grace O'Shea | |
| 1998 | The Hairy Bird | Theresa "Tweety" Goldberg | |
| 1999 | Getting to Know You | Judith | |
| 2000 | Company Man | Nora | |
| 2000 | Scream 3 | Martha Meeks | |
| 2001 | The Princess Diaries | Lilly Moscovitz | |
| 2002 | Sorority Boys | Katie | |
| 2003 | The Pink House | Charlotte | |
| 2004 | Saved! | Tia | |
| 2004 | Freshman Orientation | Jessica | |
| 2004 | The Princess Diaries 2: Royal Engagement | Lilly Moscovitz | |
| 2005 | Believe in Me | Cindy Butts | |
| 2010 | Mangus! | Jessica Simpson | |
| 2011 | Still Screaming: The Ultimate Scary Movie Retrospective | Herself | Documentary film |
| 2015 | Sidewalk Traffic | Freda Rabinowitz | |
| 2015 | Sisters | Denny | |
| 2016 | Her Composition | Gallery Owner | |
| 2016 | Girl Flu. | Lilli | |
| 2016 | The Great WTYT 960 Billboard Sitting Contest! | Jezebel | |
| 2016 | Culling Hens | Mistress | |
| 2016 | Are You Afraid of the '90s? | Jessica | Short film |
| 2018 | Don't Worry, He Won't Get Far on Foot | Shannon | |
| 2018 | Stuck | Darby Dixon | |
| 2019 | The Fiddling Horse | Rosalina Truman | |
| 2019 | Smothered by Mothers | Annie Davis | |
| 2019 | Billboard | Jezebel | |
| 2021 | Generation Wrecks | Alison Holtzman | |
| 2022 | Scream | Martha Meeks | |
| 2023 | The Mattachine Family | Annie | |
| 2023 | Booger | Ellen | |
| 2023 | Wish | Flying Woman | Voice |
| 2024 | Paper Tiger | Angela | Short film |

=== Television ===
| Year | Title | Role | Notes |
|---|---|---|---|
| 1993 | The Adventures of Pete and Pete | Natasha | 2 episodes |
| 1996 | Townies | Bethany | 4 episodes |
| 1997 | ER | Alyssa Gunther | Episode: "Random Acts" |
| 1997 | Roseanne | Heather | 4 episodes |
| 1998 | Law & Order | Stephanie Sutter | Episode: "Burden" |
| 1999 | Our Guys | Leslie Faber | Television movie |
| 1999–2000 | Now and Again | Heather Wiseman | 22 episodes Nominated—Saturn Award for Best Supporting Actress on Television; Nominated—Young Artist Award for Best Younger Supporting Actress in a Drama Series |
| 2000 | Strangers with Candy | Renee | Episode: "Is My Daddy Crazy?" |
| 2002 | St. Sass | Margo | Television movie |
| 2006–2009 | Exes and Ohs | Crutch | 8 episodes |
| 2007 | The L Word | Stacey Merkin | 4 episodes |
| 2008 | Law & Order | Janice Dunlap | Episode: "Sweetie" |
| 2008 | Life on Mars | June | Episode: "The Real Adventures of the Unreal Sam Tyler" |
| 2014 | Stalker | Emily | Episode: "Fanatic" |
| 2015 | Grey's Anatomy | Joan Paulson | 2 episodes |
| 2015 | Raymond & Lane | Reverend Mother | Episode: "Climb Every Mountain" |
| 2020 | Equal | Phyllis Lyon | Episode: "The Birth of a Movement" |
| 2022 | Queer for Fear: The History of Queer Horror | Herself | Docuseries |
| 2023 | You're Not Supposed to Be Here | Carla | Television movie |
| 2025 | Wednesday | Judi Spannagel | Season 2; guest role |
