= Teen idol (disambiguation) =

A teen idol is a celebrity who is widely idolized by teenagers.

Teen Idol may also refer to:

- Teen Idol (novel), a 2004 novel by Meg Cabot
- Teen Idols, a pop punk group
- The Teen Idles, a hardcore band

== See also ==
- Teen Age Idol, 1962 song by Rick Nelson
- Confessions of a Teen Idol, 2009 American reality TV series
