= Ten Out of Ten =

Ten Out of Ten or 10/10 may refer to:

== Music ==
- Ten Out of 10, 10cc album
- "10/10" (Paolo Nutini song), 2010
- "10/10" (Maître Gims song), 2020
- "10/10" (Rex Orange County song), 2019
- "Ten Out of Ten", song shortlisted for selection by the United Kingdom in the Eurovision Song Contest 1964
- 10 Out of 10 (2PM song), 2008
- 10 Out of 10 (Oliver Heldens song), 2023
- "Ten Out of Ten", a song by Bros from Push, 1988

== Books ==
- Ten Out of Ten, collection of stories by Allan Baillie
- The Princess Diaries, Volume X: Forever Princess, published in the United Kingdom as The Princess Diaries: Ten Out of Ten

== See also ==
- Ten Out of Tenn, a collective of singer-songwriters from Nashville, Tennessee
