= Avalon High (film) =

- Promotional poster
- Genre: Drama; Mystery; Fantasy; Teen
- Based on: Avalon High by Meg Cabot
- Written by: Julie Sherman Wolfe; Amy Talkington
- Directed by: Stuart Gillard
- Starring: Britt Robertson; Gregg Sulkin; Joey Pollari; Devon Graye
- Theme music composer: Robert Duncan
- Country of origin: United States
- Original language: English

Production
- Executive producers: Howard Braunstein; Michael Jaffe
- Producers: Janine Dickins; Stuart Gillard
- Cinematography: Thomas Burstyn
- Editor: James R. Symons
- Running time: 90 minutes
- Production companies: Jaffe/Braunstein Entertainment; Ranger Productions

Original release
- Network: Disney Channel
- Release: November 12, 2010

Avalon High is a 2010 American medieval fantasy film released as a Disney Channel Original Movie and starring Gregg Sulkin, Britt Robertson, Joey Pollari, and Devon Graye. The movie is loosely based on the 2005 book of the same name by Meg Cabot. It premiered on November 12, 2010, in the United States, January 22, 2011, in Australia and New Zealand, and January 28, 2011, in the United Kingdom.

== Plot ==
Allie Pennington, the daughter of two medieval literature scholars, enrolls at Avalon High and becomes involved in a prophesied re-staging of Arthurian legend. Allie meets various new people who she later discovers are the reincarnations of figures from the legendary Camelot. She befriends two boys: Will, a quarterback and most likely the reincarnation of Arthur, and Miles, who has psychic flashes and is most likely the reincarnation of Merlin. Allie believes that Marco—Will's stepbrother—is the reincarnation of Mordred and determined to kill Arthur (Will), which would send the world into another dark age.

At Avalon High, Allie gets assigned to a project in which Miles becomes her partner. When they are studying together at her house, they receive help from her parents who co-wrote the book based on the Order of the Bear, which they are doing the project on.

As Allie gets closer to her classmates, she starts to experience visions of King Arthur and becomes better friends with Will. She starts to suspect that the legend of the prophecy is true. She discovers at a party that Jennifer, Will's girlfriend, and Lance, Will's best friend, are having an affair behind Will's back. Allie fears if Will finds out, he would suffer the same fate as King Arthur and meet his downfall. Together, Miles and Allie discover the day King Arthur is prophesied to return.

Will suffers from a blow both in school and at practice that shakes his confidence before the big game, which Will has to win in order to gain a scholarship. Allie tries to tell Will about Jennifer and Lance's affair but is constantly "interrupted", so she enlists the help of Mr. Moore (Allie, Will, Lance, and Miles' medieval history teacher) to protect Will.

On the night of the game Will arrives early to school and sees Jennifer and Lance together and takes off; Allie gives chase. Finding Will at the forest where they had previously spent time together, she tells him that he is King Arthur, but he takes it as a metaphor about him returning to the game. Allie and Miles then attend and watch as Will returns to the game as the prophesied eclipse and meteor shower take place. At half time, Lance apologizes to Will for the affair but Will instead gives his blessing for Lance and Jennifer to be together, forgiving them both. Will then asks to meet Allie after the game, but he disappears. Allie and Miles go in search and Miles uses his psychic power to find him.

Going to the school theater, they find an injured Marco outside and Will inside the theater. Again, Allie tells him the truth of his identity. Mr. Moore arrives and reveals that he is really Mordred and Marco reveals that his father was actually a member of the Order of the Bear before he died. Ever since he died, Marco has sworn to continue his father's job to protect Arthur (Will), and had been trying to gain Mr. Moore's trust. Mr. Moore (Mordred) then attacks the group. Allie grabs a prop sword to stop Mr. Moore, but it transforms into Excalibur, revealing that she is the real reincarnation of King Arthur. Mr. Moore and Allie duel in an alternate reality, where Will, Marco, Miles (Merlin), and Lance (Lancelot) are also present and fighting. With the help of Merlin, Allie defeats Mordred.

Back in the theater, they are able to escape, and Mr. Moore is "detained" by the security officer after he tries to tell him that Allie is King Arthur and her prop sword was real. Will then rushes off to finish the football game and promises to talk with Allie afterward, and he proceeds to win the game, taking the Knights to state for the first time. Having not seen Allie and Mr. Moore's great battle, Allie's parents remark sadly about how they'll never find Arthur, oblivious to the fact that their own daughter is his reincarnation. Miles now embraces his powers and becomes more social which gets him a girlfriend. At the end of the game, Will kisses Allie.

All the characters gather at the round table dressed as their legendary counterparts. The movie closes with Allie riding along the beach with a horse.

== Cast ==
- Britt Robertson as Allie Pennington / King Arthur
- Gregg Sulkin as William Wagner / Knight
- Joey Pollari as Miles / Merlin
- Devon Graye as Marco Campbell
- Molly Quinn as Jennifer / Guinevere
- Don Lake as Mr. Pennington
- Chris Tavarez as Lance Benwick / Lancelot
- Ingrid Park as Mrs. Pennington
- Steve Valentine as Mr. Moore / Mordred
- Craig Hall as Coach Barker
- Alison Bruce as Coach Miganov
- Anthony Ingruber as Sean

== Songs ==
- The Fire Theft - Chain
- Jordin Sparks - Battlefield
- Play - Destiny

== Production ==
Filming took place in Auckland, New Zealand, at Studio West, from May 3 to June 3, 2010. Bethells Beach was used as a location for full-armour battle sequences. Mechnology Visual Effects created 134 visual effects shots for the production.

== Reception ==
The film's premiere had 3.8 million viewers.
