= Boy Meets Girl (novel) =

Book by Meg Cabot

- Author: Meg Cabot (as Meggin Cabot)
- Language: English
- Series: Boy series
- Genre: Chick lit
- Publisher: HarperCollins Publishers
- Publication date: January 2004
- Publication place: United States
- Pages: 383 pages
- ISBN: 0739439723
- Preceded by: The Boy Next Door
- Followed by: Every Boy's Got One

Boy Meets Girl is a 2004 chick lit novel by American author Meg Cabot. It was first published in January, 2004 by HarperCollins, with the author name of "Meggin Cabot"; subsequent printings say "Meg Cabot". It is the second book in the Boy series, but its story is only loosely connected to that of its predecessor, The Boy Next Door.

== Synopsis ==
The book follows Kate Mackenzie, who works in the Human Resources division of the New York Journal. She spends much of her days trying to find a good apartment, attempting to avoid her dictator-esque boss Amy, and trying to sort out her complicated relationship with a commitment-phobic boyfriend. Kate begins to despair once Amy forces her to fire an incredibly popular co-worker in one of the office's lunch rooms, which results in the employee suing her for wrongful termination. Things get even worse when she is also obligated to give a deposition to the handsome and wealthy Mitch Hertzog. The two are at odds over several things, but Kate finds herself growing wildly attracted to him.

== Reception ==
Critical reception for Boy Meets Girl was mostly positive. Publishers Weekly commented that the book was "less a novel than a collection of lighthearted barbs, gleeful clichés and panicky (but comic and brief) freakouts" but ultimately stated it was a "fluffy, fun urban fairy tale". The book also garnered a positive reviews from the Arizona Republic and Booklist.
