= Allie Finkle's Rules for Girls =

Novel by Meg Cabot

- Author: Meg Cabot
- Language: English
- Genre: Juvenile novel
- Published: Scholastic

Allie Finkle's Rules for Girls is a juvenile novel series for tweenage girls by Meg Cabot, published by Scholastic Corporation.

== Plot ==
The series revolves around nine-year-old Allie Finkle, who narrates the stories. She keeps a notebook of tips on what to do and what not to do in the various situations in which she finds herself. Each chapter title is one of the rules she has invented. Allie has three best friends who support her through all her adventures and a beautiful teacher, named Mrs. Hunter, whom she admires.

In the first book, Allie's family moves from the suburbs to an old house in the town. Allie goes through a few obstacles as she strives to make new friends and adjust to her new school.

The series has five other books that include similar adventures. Themes include: moving, growing up, friendship, and family.

== List of books in series ==
1. Moving Day (2008)
2. The New Girl (2008)
3. Best Friends and Drama Queens (2009)
4. Stage Fright (2009)
5. Glitter Girls and the Great Fake Out (2010)
6. Blast From the Past (2010)
7. Les Vacances à Paris (2016- French only)
8. Le camp d'été/La colo (2017 - French only)
9. Demoiselle d'honneur (2021 - French only)

== Covers ==
Laura James, a former American print model, is featured on the covers of the US series (as well as on the Scholastic website) as the face of Allie Finkle.

The girl on the front cover of the first 3 UK editions is called Emily.
