= All American Girl (novel) =

Novel by Meg Cabot

- First edition
- Author: Meg Cabot
- Language: English
- Series: All-American Girl series
- Genre: Young adult novel
- Publisher: HarperCollins
- Publication date: 2002
- Publication place: United States
- Media type: Print (Paperback)
- ISBN: 978-0-330-41555-2
- OCLC: 51316280
- Followed by: Ready or Not

All American Girl is a young adult novel written by Meg Cabot. It reached number one in The New York Times Bestseller List for children's books in 2002.

A sequel titled, Ready or Not was released in 2005. Meg Cabot also wrote a short story, "Another All-American Girl" included in Our White House: Looking In, Looking Out.

== Plot summary ==
Samantha Madison lives in Washington, D.C and is a sophomore at John Adams Preparatory School. An outcast, she has only one friend, Catherine. Sam is a huge fan of Gwen Stefani and often laments that she is not more like Gwen, though she is against most other aspects of popular culture and dyes her entire wardrobe black because she is "mourning for her generation." A middle child, Sam often feels inferior because her older sister, Lucy, is a cheerleader, and therefore one of the most popular girls in school, and her younger sister, Rebecca, is so intelligent that she takes college-level classes at a school for gifted kids. Sam is very different from her traditional parents—her father is an international economist at the World Bank and her mother is an environmental lawyer. Sam also believes she is in love with Lucy's boyfriend Jack. Jack is the complete social opposite of big sister Lucy, having an artistic yet rebellious attitude to life and claiming that teenagers need to fight the system.

Sam is an aspiring artist and draws celebrity portraits during her German class, which she has a C− in. Her sister Lucy finds out and shows them to the family at dinner. As a punishment, her parents decide to enroll her in bi-weekly art classes at local artist Susan Boone's studio. Sam goes to her first class where she is reprimanded by Boone for drawing what she knows and not what she sees. Offended, Sam decides to skip the next class choosing to occupy her time at the nearby Capitol Cookies and Static (a record store). While she is waiting for her housekeeper to pick up from art class, she notices a man she saw earlier at Static who was listening to Billy Joel's "Uptown Girl". The man turns out to be an assassin and as he takes a gun to shoot the President who is exiting Capitol Cookies, Sam jumps on him and causes him to misfire. She breaks her arm in the process as the man falls on top of her when she jumps on him.

In the aftermath, Sam becomes a celebrity and is declared a national hero. She is also appointed Teen Ambassador to the United Nations. She is no longer a social outcast and becomes popular at school, where she receives numerous social invitations and even gets sucked up to by Kris Parks, her nemesis. When she meets the President, she also meets his son who turns out to be David from her art class at Susan Boone's. As she gets closer to David, she deals with her conflicting feelings for Jack—who she thought was her soulmate—and the President's son.
