= Ready or Not (novel) =

2005 novel by Meg Cabot

Ready Or Not
- Author: Meg Cabot
- Language: English
- Series: All-American Girl series
- Genre: Young adult novel
- Publisher: HarperCollins
- Publication date: 2005
- Publication place: United States
- Media type: Print (hardback & paperback)
- Pages: 256 pp (first edition, hardback)
- ISBN: 978-0-06-072450-4 (first edition, hardback)
- OCLC: 57344142
- LC Class: PZ7.C11165 Re 2005
- Preceded by: All-American Girl

Ready or Not is the sequel to the novel All-American Girl. Both were written by Meg Cabot, who is also the author of The Princess Diaries. The book takes place about one year after the events of All-American Girl.

In 2022, the novel was banned by the School District of Indian River County in Florida.

== Plot ==
Samantha "Sam" Madison is still teen ambassador to the United Nations and happily dating the President's son, David. She is also still a semi-celebrity for saving the President's life but does not like the attention she gets for it. As a way to go back to being unnoticed, Sam dyes her naturally red hair to jet black at the beginning of the novel. She and David also start to take a life-drawing class together, though she did not realize that it was about sketching nude models.

When David invites her to spend Thanksgiving at Camp David, Sam believes that he wants to have sex. Unsure of whether she's ready for that step in their relationship, she consults her older sister Lucy. Lucy ends up being extremely helpful by giving her sex advice and buying Sam contraceptives.

Meanwhile, The President announces his "Return to Family" campaign, which includes plans to limit access to abortion and birth control. Samantha is faced with a huge dilemma when she accidentally comes off as condemning the "Return to Family" policy on an MTV special by accidentally implying that she and David have had sex.

Sam receives mostly negative backlash for her remarks, but is supported by her friends and family for being honest. When she goes to Camp David during Thanksgiving, she waits in her room all night for David to come, but he never does. Feeling furious, she sneaks into David's room and berates him for his mixed-messages over them having sex. David replies that he didn't mean to imply that anything was going to happen between them. Sam comes to understand that she made up the whole dilemma in her head, but also realizes that she does want to have sex because she loves David.

When Sam comes home, she tells Lucy about her and David's first time and discovers that Lucy is actually still a virgin. Lucy explains that she wants to find someone she truly loves before taking that big step. She believes that her tutor Harold is "the One" for her, like how David is for Sam.
