= The Mediator =

Young adult novel series

- Shadowland (2000); Ninth Key (2001); Reunion (2001); Darkest Hour (2001); Haunted (2004); Twilight (2004); Remembrance (2016)
- Author: Meg Cabot
- Country: United States
- Language: English
- Genre: Fiction, Romance, Supernatural fiction
- Publisher: Simon & Schuster (2000-2004); HarperCollins
- Published: 2000–2016
- Media type: Print
- No. of books: 7 (with 1 short story, and 1 novella)

The Mediator is a young adult paranormal romance book series written by American author Meg Cabot. The series debuted in 2000 with its first novel, Shadowland, and centers on a teenage girl who can communicate with ghosts and acts as a mediator to help spirits resolve unfinished business so they can move on to the afterlife.

Originally published under Cabot's pseudonym Jenny Carroll, the first four novels were published by Simon & Schuster. The fifth and sixth books were published by HarperCollins and under Meg Cabot's name. In 2016, twelve years after the publication of the sixth installment Twilight, the seventh and final novel, Remembrance, was released under William Morrow, an imprint of HarperCollins.

== Plot summary ==
The series follows a girl named Susannah "Suze" Simon, a sixteen-year-old from New York City who moves to Carmel-by-the-Sea, California after her widowed mother remarries. Suze is a "mediator": a person who has abilities to see, touch, and talk to ghosts, and her main goal is to help them to the "Great Beyond" (afterlife). Running throughout the series is a central narrative arc involving Hector "Jesse" de Silva, a nineteenth-century ghost who died in Suze's bedroom 150 years prior and refuses to leave. Suze eventually grows to fall in love with him, but his undead nature makes him invisible to the average person; he is unable to interact with anyone besides mediators and other ghosts.

The books are written in first-person narrative from Suze's perspective. Each novel typically centers on a different ghost — ranging from classmates and local residents to historical figures whom Suze must assist or, in the case of violent poltergeists, forcibly exorcise. In the first installment, Shadowland, Suze attends a Catholic academy headed by a priest, Father Dominic, who is the first fellow mediator she has ever met. A recurring conflict also involves Paul Slater, another mediator introduced in the fourth book Darkest Hour whom Suze deeply dislikes and considers her nemesis. Paul acts as a foil to the duo and serves as a minor antagonist in the following novels.

Suze's early tasks involve simple hauntings. The scope of her abilities increases across the novels as she encounters more malevolent spirits and rival mediators; she eventually gains the ability to travel to the "Shadowland," also known as the Land of Damnation, and subsequently travel through time.

== Background ==
=== Origin ===
The concept for The Mediator was inspired by the death of Meg Cabot's father in 1994. Following his passing, Cabot and her brother experienced the sensation of "seeing him out of the corners of [their] eyes." Cabot also drew heavily from her own childhood for the series' setting; like the protagonist Susannah Simon, she lived in Carmel, California while her father taught at the Naval Academy in Monterey. She studied at the Junipero Serra Mission School, which served as the model for the fictional mission academy in the books.

=== Publication ===
Cabot stated that she originally planned the series as an eight-book arc, although her original publisher, Simon & Schuster, contracted her for only four. Following the release of the fourth book, Darkest Hour, the publisher declined her proposal for further installments due to low sales. However, with the success of The Princess Diaries series, HarperCollins acquired the rights to the first four novels. This allowed Cabot to republish the existing titles under her real name and complete the series with two additional volumes, Haunted and Twilight, totaling six books in the original run.

In several posts on her blog and forums, she stated that she had the plot of an "epilogue/sequel" on file, and needs only the time to write it out. Years later, this sequel was eventually announced on her blog, detailing that Susannah and Jesse are now engaged and that the book would be an adult installment as opposed to young adult, titled Remembrance. It was teased in 2015 along with the companion novella Proposal to commemorate Shadowland (alternatively titled Love You to Death)'s 15th anniversary. The official publication date for the United States and Canada was February 2, 2016.

== Publishing history ==
1. Shadowland (2000, also known in the UK as Love You to Death)
2. Ninth Key (2001, also known in the UK as High Stakes)
3. Reunion (2001, also known in the UK as Mean Spirits)
4. Darkest Hour (2001, also known in the UK as Young Blood)
5. Haunted (2004, also known in the UK as Grave Doubts)
6. Twilight (2004, also known in the UK as Heaven Sent)
7. Every Girl's Dream (2004, short story)
8. Proposal (2016, novella)
9. Remembrance (2016)

== Critical reception ==
The Mediator series received generally mixed to positive reviews from critics, who frequently praised Cabot's signature humorous tone and the relatable voice of the protagonist, Susannah Simon. Publishers Weekly commented that she is "a bit too tough-talking and cocky to be credible; [...] still, the intriguing premise of a 16-year-old with a sixth sense may stand more than a ghost of a chance at snaring teen readers." The Hamilton Spectator found the book entertaining overall, but it did not measure up to Cabot's The Princess Diaries series. Kirkus Reviews, while praising Cabot's humor, wrote that "Suze's repetitious obsessing gives the material a padded feel, and the perfunctory plot barely hangs together."

Reviewers also noted that the earlier books followed a "ghost-of-the-week" formula. Debbie Stewart of the School Library Journal criticized Darkest Hour for the fact that "almost every male in this book is a 'hottie'". Despite this, Stewart found that "the plot development is steady and, if not always believable, it is satisfying." She recommended the novel for fans of R. L. Stine's Fear Street and Buffy the Vampire Slayer. For Haunted, Deborah Stevenson of the Bulletin of the Center for Children's Books praised the author's "flip and fluffy tone" but found the novel's Paul subplot unconvincing.

The 2016 release of the adult-marketed finale, Remembrance, was met with nostalgic praise for its "brilliant" handling of the characters' transition into adulthood, with Kirkus Reviews calling it "a fun and satisfying grown-up update on Suze's life."

== Adaptation ==
In a 2020 blog, Cabot confirmed that American-Australian writer and director Sarah Spillane had shown her a script of a possible adaptation of Shadowland. Spillane had expressed interest in the novels, describing it as "The Sixth Sense meets Twilight with an edgy bad-ass female lead." Debra Martin Chase, who had previously produced The Princess Diaries's Disney film adaptations, was set to produce the project. The novels were initially pitched to Netflix as a film series with a one-hour runtime per book which would total to seven movies. Filming was planned in 2020, but was delayed due to the COVID-19 pandemic. In 2023, Cabot announced that the project was shut down after Netflix dropped the rights to the novel.
