= Anthony Ingruber =

Dutch-Australian actor (born 1990)

- Born: 5 February 1990 (age 36)
- Occupations: Actor; Impressionist
- Years active: 2006–present
- Website: anthonyingruber.com

Anthony Ingruber (born 5 February 1990) is a Dutch-Australian actor and impressionist. Ingruber is best known for his role as John Doe/Joker in the video games Batman: The Telltale Series (2016) and Batman: The Enemy Within (2017–18) as well as for portraying the younger version of Harrison Ford's character William Jones in the film The Age of Adaline (2015) and body doubling for Ford as Indiana Jones in Indiana Jones and the Dial of Destiny (2023).

== Early life ==
Anthony Ingruber was born on 5 February 1990 and grew up in Australia, New Zealand, Cyprus, the Netherlands and Canada. In Canada, Ingruber attended a drama school and used internet platforms like YouTube to publish his voice impressions.

== Career ==
Since 2006, Ingruber has played supporting roles in different TV series. In 2008, he uploaded videos on YouTube which included a Han Solo impression. He also had a very small extra part in James Cameron's Avatar as a technician and worked for Weta Workshop while he lived in New Zealand.

His first movie role was in the Disney TV movie Avalon High in 2010. Since then, Ingruber has appeared in a variety of work, including voice over and acting in industrial, independent, and feature films.

Ingruber has become known on the Internet for his impressions of and uncanny resemblance to a young Harrison Ford, which helped him in winning the role of Young William, the young version of Ford's character, in the 2015 film The Age of Adaline.

Ingruber was a body double for Harrison Ford in Indiana Jones and the Dial of Destiny (2023) during the 30-minute opening sequence set in 1944, where de-aging was used on Ford, with his performance as Indiana Jones overlaid over Ingruber's own. He has an additional cameo role as one of the hotel guests during the Morocco hotel auction scene where he is one of many that point a gun towards Jones.

== Filmography ==
=== Film ===
Year	Title	Role	Notes
2008	Over the Front: The Great War in the Air	Air Force Pilot	Multimedia exhibition short Directed by Peter Jackson
2009	Avatar	Ground Technician	Extra; Uncredited
2009	Reminiscence	Ghost	Short film Voice
2010	Avalon High	Sean	Disney television film
2010	Last Minute	Passenger	Short film Voice
2012	The Force	Joe	Short film
2015	The Age of Adaline	Young William Jones	Role shared with Harrison Ford
2015	Eyes Open Nevermore	Leonard Jesenski	Short film
2015	Sincerely, Batman	Batman/Joker	Short film Voice
2015	How Star Wars Fans Think	Narrator/Han Solo	Short film Voice
2015	Tempus Box	Ion Captain	Short film Voice
2017	The Monster	Ed (adult)	Short film
2023	Indiana Jones and the Dial of Destiny	1944 Indiana Jones	Body double for de-aged Harrison Ford
2023	Indiana Jones and the Dial of Destiny	Hotel guest	Cameo role; during the Morocco hotel auction scene
2025	Primitive War	Gerald Keyes	

=== Television ===
Year	Title	Role	Notes
2006	Sensing Murder	Policeman	One episode
2006	Karaoke High	Tony	One episode
2012	How It Should Have Ended	James Bond	One episode Voice
2013	Lego: The Dark Knight Minifig Theater	Joker	One episode Voice
2013	Skyrim at the Movies	Tony Stark/Thor	Two episodes Voice
2013	Air Aces	Sgt. Hugh Johnson	Episode: "Wing Walker"
2015	Schmoes Know Movie Show	Himself	One episode Episode 179
2017	Batman: Unmasked	Himself	One episode Episode 5
2017	Dark Spud	Donut Police Officer Jeff Goldblum	One episode Episode 8 Voice

=== Video games ===
Year	Title	Role	Notes
2014	Deadstone	Lieutenant Blake	Main role
2016	Batman: The Telltale Series	John Doe / Joker	
2017–2018	Batman: The Enemy Within	John Doe / Joker	
2018	Lego DC Super-Villains	Johnny Quick	
TBA	Private Eye	Sam Sutherland	Main role VR game Awaiting release
2020	Amnesia: Rebirth	Leon de Vries	
2020	Dark Deception: Monsters and Mortals	Doug Houser, Detective Evans, Prisoner Borisov	
2022	Horizon Forbidden West	Hades	
2022–2026	Gloomwood	Constables	Voice work contributed for 2026 update
