= Don't Hang Up (film) =

- Theatrical release poster
- Directed by: Alexis Wajsbrot; Damien Macé
- Written by: Joe Johnson
- Produced by: Laurie Cook; Jason Newmark; Romain Philippe; Olivier Philippe; Farah Abushwesha; Alexis Wajsbrot; Damien Macé
- Starring: Gregg Sulkin; Garrett Clayton; Bella Dayne; Sienna Guillory
- Cinematography: Nat Hill
- Edited by: Carmela Iandoli
- Music by: Aleksi Aubry-Carlson
- Production companies: Bigscope Films; Don't Hang Up Films; Wild Spark
- Distributed by: Vertical Entertainment
- Release dates: 4 June 2016 (LA Film Festival); 10 February 2017 (United States)
- Running time: 83 minutes
- Countries: United Kingdom; United States
- Language: English
- Box office: $332,571

Don't Hang Up is a 2016 horror-thriller film written by Joe Johnson and directed by Alexis Wajsbrot and Damien Macé. The film stars Gregg Sulkin, Garrett Clayton, Bella Dayne, and Sienna Guillory. The film had its world premiere on 4 June 2016 at the Los Angeles Film Festival and was released in theaters in the United States on 10 February 2017.

== Plot ==
Teenage pranksters Brady, Sam, Jeff, and Roy go viral after tricking a woman named Mrs. Kolbein into believing an intruder is in her house. Later, while Sam is home alone, Brady joins him to make more prank calls, including one that accidentally ropes in Jeff, who works at a pizzeria with Sam's girlfriend Peyton, leaving Jeff angry at his friends.

A mysterious man named Mr. Lee begins harassing Sam and Brady with calls and texts, proving his threat by revealing intimate details about their lives. Peyton arrives with an unrequested pizza and reports that Jeff has disappeared. Mr. Lee then cuts the house's power and phone lines, sending video footage showing he is holding Brady's parents hostage. He proceeds to murder Roy on camera and leaves Jeff bound and suffocating outside, where Jeff dies shortly after Sam tries to rescue him.

While Sam is away, Mr. Lee offers Brady his parents' freedom if he kills Sam, and captures Peyton as well. After discovering Brady's secret communication with Mr. Lee, a fight breaks out, leaving Brady unconscious. Mr. Lee then offers to release Peyton if Sam kills Brady, prompting Sam to zip-tie Brady to a banister. Investigating a clue, Sam discovers a social media profile showing Mr. Lee has been stalking them for a year, along with a video revealing that Brady has been sleeping with Peyton, leading Sam to beat Brady again.

Sam realizes the hostage video is pre-recorded, meaning Brady's parents are already dead. Believing Peyton is also dead, the boys plan to escape, but Brady locks Sam outside and heads into the backyard, where he discovers Mr. Lee had disguised himself as Jeff's body, which was placed in a swing, to infiltrate the house before being ambushed and attacked by Mr. Lee. Meanwhile, Sam rescues Peyton from a nearby surveillance van, sending her for help and goes to look for Brady. Hearing screams, Sam rushes to the backyard and fights with Mr. Lee before stabbing him with a knife the latter held, only to discover he was actually a bound and gagged Brady disguised by Mr. Lee, who reveals his motive: the woman targeted in the boys' prank was his wife, who accidentally shot their daughter and then committed suicide out of grief. Seeking vengeance, Mr. Kolbein murders Peyton, frames Sam for the entire massacre, and leaves him to be arrested by the arriving police. During the credits, Kolbein targets a new group of teenage pranksters.

== Cast ==
- Gregg Sulkin as Sam Fuller
- Garrett Clayton as Brady Mannion
- Bella Dayne as Peyton Grey
- Sienna Guillory as Mrs. Kolbein
- Edward Killingback as Prank Monkey 69
- Jack Brett Anderson as Jeff Mosley
- Robert Goodman as Larry
- Connie Wilkins as Izzy Kolbein
- Parker Sawyers as Mr. Kolbein (credited as Mr. Lee)
  - Philip Desmueles as Voice of Mr. Kolbein

== Reception ==
The review aggregator website Rotten Tomatoes reported a 25% approval rating with an average rating of 3.91/10 based on 16 reviews.
