= Haunted (Cabot novel) =

2004 book by Meg Cabot

- First edition
- Author: Meg Cabot
- Language: English
- Series: The Mediator
- Genre: Young adult novel
- Publisher: HarperTeen
- Publication date: December 28, 2004
- Publication place: United States
- Media type: Print (Hardback)
- Preceded by: Darkest Hour
- Followed by: Twilight

Haunted is a young adult novel written by author Meg Cabot and was published by Avon Books in 2004. It is the fifth book in The Mediator series, following the adventures of teenage mediator Susannah 'Suze' Simon, and was a New York Times best seller. Its alternative title is Grave Doubts.

== Background ==
The first four books in The Mediator series were published by Pocket Books, with Cabot writing under the pseudonym Jenny Carroll. Upon the success of her series The Princess Diaries and its film adaptation, HarperCollins bought the rights to the series. Haunted was the first Mediator book that HarperCollins released and also the first under Cabot's own name, which the publisher displayed prominently on the cover.

== Plot ==
On her first day of junior year Suze is horrified to find that Paul Slater is now attending the Mission Academy, having moved to town to care for his ailing grandfather. At dinner that evening, she meets Neil Jankow, a college friend of Jake's, and Neil's brother Craig, a ghost. Suze learns that Craig recently died in a catamaran accident, and that he believes Neil should have been the one who died, as he was the weaker swimmer. When he leaves, Suze and Jesse argue over whether to report his existence to Father Dom.

Paul invites Suze to his house after school the next day, promising to expand her mediator training. There, he tells her that they are "shifters" - powerful mediators with extended abilities, including inter-dimensional travel - and abruptly kisses her. Furious, Suze runs away and is picked up by Neil, who drives her home, but during the trip, Craig takes over the wheel, nearly killing them both. Jesse discovers that Paul is back in town when he sends Suze a bouquet of flowers as an apology. At school a few days later, Father Dom informs Suze that Jesse will be moving out of her room to the Mission's rectory, leading her to believe that their relationship is over. Paul attempts to recruit Suze again, but she lashes out at him, and he leaves school.

Later that week, Suze's stepbrother Brad throws a house party while their parents are out. During the party, Jesse learns that Paul had kissed Suze, and tries to kill him. To end the fight, Suze drags Paul into the spirit plane, but unknowingly takes Craig with them. Realizing that he is getting nowhere by trying to hurt Neil, Craig willingly steps into the next world. Paul proposes a deal to Suze: he will not harm Jesse and teach her more about her mediator abilities if she agrees to spend time with him; Suze accepts, in order to protect Jesse. They return to the party as it is broken up, and Paul is sent to the hospital for his injuries.

At the Father Serra festival the next day, Suze meets Dr. Slaski, Paul's grandfather, who reveals that he is also a shifter, and warns her not to trust Paul. After hearing this, Suze runs to the mission's cemetery and meets Jesse once again, who admits that he distanced himself from her because he thought she deserved someone living. She reaffirms her love for him, and they kiss.

== Critical reception ==
The book received mixed reviews. Deborah Stevenson of the Bulletin of the Center for Children's Books praised Cabot's "flip and fluffy tone" but found the Paul subplot unconvincing. The Hamilton Spectator found the book entertaining overall but wrote that it did not measure up to The Princess Diaries series. Kirkus Reviews, while praising Cabot's humor, wrote that "Suze’s repetitious obsessing gives the material a padded feel, and the perfunctory plot barely hangs together."
