= Shadowland (Cabot novel) =

Novel by Meg Cabot

- First edition
- Author: Meg Cabot
- Language: English
- Series: The Mediator
- Genre: Young adult novel
- Publisher: Pocket Pulse
- Publication date: 2000
- Publication place: United States
- Media type: Print (Paperback)
- Pages: 245
- ISBN: 0-671-78791-8
- OCLC: 57363197
- Followed by: Ninth Key

Shadowland is a young adult novel written by author Meg Cabot and published by Avon Books in 2000. It is the first part of The Mediator series. Its alternative title is Love You To Death.

== Plot summary ==
Sixteen-year-old Susannah 'Suze' Simon is a mediator, which means she can see and talk to ghosts. Suze spends a lot of time directing the usually unhappy dead to the afterlife. However, her job is not easy, as not all ghosts want to be guided. Every day, she is haunted by the fact that they will not leave her alone until she helps them resolve their unfinished business with the living.

Suze, whose father died when she was six, moves from New York to Carmel, California after her mom's second marriage to Andy Ackerman, a carpenter. She gets three stepbrothers, Jake, Brad, and David, whom she nicknames Sleepy (a senior), Dopey (a sophomore like Suze), and Doc (a seventh grader). However, when Suze arrives at her new home, she finds a handsome, archaic ghost named Jesse de Silva sitting on her window seat. Irritated, she tells Jesse to move on or find some other house to haunt, as now she is living there, but he refuses.

Suze hopes to start fresh in California, with trips to the beach instead of the cemetery and sunbathing instead of tending to lost souls. On her first day at the Junipero Serra Mission Academy, however, she is immediately faced with the angry ghost of Heather Chambers, the student whose place she took: Heather had committed suicide when her boyfriend Bryce Martinson broke up with her. Father Dominic, the school principal and a fellow mediator, is surprised to learn that Suze uses physical violence to subdue ghosts like Heather, and insists that she should use friendlier, more peaceful methods of mediation. Suze refuses, saying that she has done this job her whole life and is not going to change.

When Heather's old friends - including Bryce - begin to show interest in Suze, Heather claims Suze is taking over the life she had, and ignores all attempts to placate her. One night, after Heather attempts to kill Bryce, Suze sneaks out to the Mission to try and talk her into moving on, but Heather misconstrues her meaning, harbouring the false hope that she might get her life back. When Suze tries to explain that this is not the case, Heather enters a rage and tries to use her ghostly powers to kill Suze, who narrowly escapes with the help of Jesse.

The next day, Father Dom is unhappy with Suze's attempt to deal with Heather alone and the damage it has caused to the school grounds. She tries to explain that it was going to work, but that Heather's strength has reached unexpected levels. Several days later, Heather attempts to kill Bryce again, and is barely stopped by Father Dominic; both men are injured in the process. Furious, Suze returns to school that evening - ignoring Jesse's warnings - and performs a voodoo exorcism, successfully sending Heather to the afterlife. However, as she is exorcised, Heather causes the school breezeway to collapse on Suze, who is knocked unconscious and barely saved by Sleepy and Doc.

The next day, Suze learns that she has been elected vice-president of the sophomore class, replacing Heather. Although Father Dom is glad that the ghost is gone, he remains unimpressed with Suze's mediation techniques. He also informs her that Bryce has transferred to another high school, much to her dismay, but reminds her that it is for his safety. In her spare time, Suze researches Jesse's past, and, with Doc's help, she discovers that Jesse died 150 years ago under mysterious circumstances on his way to marry his cousin Maria. Suze later talks to Jesse, and while they set out some ground rules regarding his presence, she remains confused about her feelings towards him.

== Characters ==
• Suzanna "Suze" Simon - a teenager sixteen years old She moves from New York to Carmel, California. She has the special ability to see and talk to dead people, a gift called mediation that gets her into a lot of trouble. She is in love with Hector "Jesse" De Silva a ghost of a muscular cowboy who lived in his room in 1600, at the time the house was a kind of cowboy inn. Jesse is his best friend and who she is in love.

• Hector "Jesse" De Silva - ghost of a muscular cowboy who lives in Suzanna's room, Jesse is funny, outgoing and loves reading old books, Jesse has a ghostly pet dog Spike. Suzanna is in love with Jesse but because of her tough girl ways she doesn't tell him anything. Throughout the series, Jesse shows jealousy towards Suze, and at other times, he seems to dislike her. Jesse died in 1600 in Suzanna's room, at the time the place was a kind of cowboy inn, Jesse was murdered by the lover of his cousin and ex-fiancée Diego De Silva at the request of his evil cousin Maria De Silva, after he refused to marry her.

• Jake "Sleepy" Ackerman - Suzanna's half-brother, he is nicknamed Sleepy for being quite lazy and sleepy. Jake is the older brother, he works in several jobs, from pizza delivery to hotel assistant.

• Brad "Dopey" Ackerman - Suzanna's half brother, he is the middle brother, older than Suzanna and David. He likes to party, has a lot of friends and dates a lot of girls. His best friend is the late Craig, a boy who appears only in Darkest Hour.

• David "Doc" Ackerman - Suzanna's younger half-brother, the youngest in the family. He is the most intelligent brother, because of his unusual intelligence he is looked down upon by the rest of the family.

• Andy Ackerman - Suzanna's stepfather, he is a great cook.

• Father Dominic - a priest who is also a mediator and sees dead people, and the director of the Junípero Serra Mission Academy, the Catholic school where Suzanna studies.

• Bryce Martinson - A boy who studies at the Junipero Serra Mission Academy, he is a love interest of Suzanna Simon, after the death of his ex-girlfriend Heather Chambers. He is described as having a muscular physique and great beauty.

• Heather Chambers - Bryce Martinson's ex-girlfriend, she died in an accident and seeks revenge against Bryce, Suzanna has to intervene to save Bryce from Heather's evil ghost

• Cece Web - Suzanna Simon's best friend at Academia Missão Junipero Serra, she takes a journalism course and does an internship at the local newspaper Carmel's pine as a reporter.

• Adam Boldman - Suzanna Simon's best friend, he is a love interest of Cece Web.

• Aunt Pru - is briefly mentioned as Cece Web's aunt, making no appearance in Shadowland, only Ninth Key. She is an old charlatan medium who claims to predict the future.

• Suzanna's mother - she is married to Andy Ackerman, a chef with three children. Suzanna's mother is a TV journalist.

Robert "Bob" Simon - Suzanna Simon's biological father, he died and his ghost returns to talk to his daughter after some time, in his rare appearances he is shown to be sarcastic and playful.
