= Reunion (Cabot novel) =

Novel in Meg Cabot's The Mediator series

- First edition
- Author: Meg Cabot
- Language: English
- Series: The Mediator
- Genre: Young adult novel
- Publisher: Pulse
- Publication date: 2001
- Publication place: United States
- Media type: Print (Paperback)
- Pages: 240 PP
- ISBN: 0-671-78812-4
- OCLC: 57388203
- Preceded by: Ninth Key
- Followed by: Darkest Hour

Reunion is the third installment of the young adult series The Mediator written by Meg Cabot. It was first published by Simon & Schuster in July, 2001 under the author's alternative pseudonym Jenny Carroll.

== Plot ==
When Suze’s best friend from New York, Gina, comes to visit her in Carmel, her stepbrothers Jake and Brad (aka Sleepy and Dopey) start fighting for Gina's attention. While they are at the beach one afternoon, a group of ghosts in formal wear catches Suze's attention. She learns that they were popular students from a local high school, nicknamed the 'RLS Angels', who had recently died in a car crash after their spring formal, and that her quiet, geeky classmate Michael Meducci was the driver of the other car in the accident. The Angels are furious at Michael for their deaths, and make it clear that they will not stop at anything to kill him. They make several attempts on his life, each one desperately fended off by Suze. Unfortunately, Michael interprets Suze's constant presence as her having a crush on him, so he tries to pursue a relationship with her, much to the amusement of her family and friends.

Father Dominic and Suze investigate the scene of the accident, accompanied by Jesse. When the RLS Angels appear, Jesse calms them down so that Father Dom and Suze can talk to them. Suze discovers that Michael killed the Angels on purpose as revenge for his younger sister, who is in a coma after drinking too much and almost drowning at one of their parties. When Suze's mother finds out that Michael was involved in the 'accident', she forbids Suze to get in a car with him, but Suze doesn't listen. She asks Michael to pick her up and they go to the scene of the murder.

Suze tricks Michael into a confession, but he realizes Suze is going to expose him and tries to kill her. Suze summons the Angels to protect herself, but when she tries to stop them from killing Michael again, they turn their wrath on her. Furiously, they beat up Suze and Jesse, who has followed her. Suze is badly injured and taken to the hospital, where she finds that Michael has confessed to the police and is going behind bars, and Father Dom reassures her that the Angels have now moved on. The day after Michael’s arrest, his sister wakes up from her coma.

Everyone visits Suze in the hospital except Jesse, which makes her sad, and when she catches him trying to dematerialize, she expresses her hurt. Jesse admits his concern, calling her querida, and Suze stops denying that she loves him.
