= The Princess Diaries, Volume XI: Royal Wedding =

2015 romance novel by Meg Cabot

Royal Wedding: A Princess Diaries Novel
- Author: Meg Cabot
- Language: English
- Series: The Princess Diaries
- Genre: Romance novel
- Publisher: William Morrow
- Publication date: 2 June 2015
- Publication place: United States
- Pages: 448(USA)
- ISBN: 978-0-06-237908-5
- Preceded by: The Princess Diaries, Volume X: Forever Princess

The Princess Diaries, Volume XI: Royal Wedding is a book in the Princess Diaries series. Written by Meg Cabot, it was released on June 2, 2015 by William Morrow and is the first adult installment of the series.

== Plot summary ==
Eight years after the events of Forever Princess, Mia Thermopolis is about to turn 26, has graduated from college, and runs a youth community center in New York City named after her late stepfather Frank Gianini (whom we learn died unexpectedly of undiagnosed congestive heart failure). She is still dating Michael Moscovitz, and remains close to her high school friends. Perin and Ling Su are now a couple (they both work for Mia at the youth center), Lilly Moscovitz is a law student about to take the bar exam, Tina Hakim Baba is a medical student, though she has broken up with Boris (who left behind classical music to become the world's biggest rock star) due to Boris becoming embroiled in a sex scandal with a fan, Shameeka Taylor works in marketing for Vera Wang, and Lana Weinberger is now Lana Rockefeller, a married mom.

Mia's father, Prince Phillipe, is up for re-election as Genovia's prime minister, but becomes embroiled in scandal when he is arrested for car racing on the streets of New York, damaging his chances at re-election. He has also become a heavy drinker, which contributes to his unpopularity in the polls. The scandal has caused Mia to have to move into an apartment in the Genovian embassy, in order to be somewhat protected from the protesters and paparazzi that hound her every move.

While on vacation in the Exumas, Michael proposes to Mia, and she happily accepts. Upon their return to New York, Grand-mère tells her of a shocking discovery: Phillipe fathered an illegitimate child 12 years ago in a fling with a now-deceased charter flight pilot, and has been secretly making child-support payments all this time. After he confesses this to Mia, she tracks down her half-sister, Olivia Grace, in New Jersey, where she is being raised by her maternal aunt's family. Upon discovering that they are treating her poorly, she takes Olivia back to New York, where they are soon subject to intense press exposure and a custody battle with Olivia's aunt and uncle, who have been embezzling the child-support money. To complicate matters, Mia finds out that she is pregnant with twins when she goes to the doctor for a foot injury.

As she brings Olivia into the family, while preparing for her wedding, Mia comes to understand what Grand-mère has been trying to teach her for years: in the real world, there will be no one to cushion blows for you, and every challenge she has faced has been to prepare her for a situation like Olivia's. Phillipe, realizing that he is still in love with Mia's mother (to Grand-mère's dismay), abdicates and moves to Genovia with her, Rocky, and Olivia. At the end of the novel, Mia marries Michael, and prepares for her new life as crown princess of Genovia.

== Reception ==
Royal Wedding received generally positive notices. Kirkus Reviews praised Cabot's “hilarious dialogue” and “zany characters,” calling the novel “a funny, heartwarming story” that is “royally perfect from start to finish.” Booklist described it as “a whirlwind of jaw-dropping, hilarious, and occasionally touching events,” noting that original fans “now adults themselves, will be thrilled,” while it remains enjoyable across Cabot's readership; this assessment is quoted on the author's site. The novel was also named one of Glamour’s “Hottest Beach Reads” of Summer 2015, which called it “the next best thing” to a new Princess Diaries film and highlighted its focus on Mia's royal wedding plans.
