= Twilight (Cabot novel) =

Novel by Meg Cabot

- First edition
- Author: Meg Cabot
- Language: English
- Series: The Mediator
- Genre: Young adult novel, Romance, Supernatural
- Publisher: HarperTeen
- Publication date: December 2004
- Publication place: United States
- Media type: Print
- Preceded by: Haunted
- Followed by: Remembrance

Twilight is the sixth young adult novel in the Mediator series by Meg Cabot, published by HarperTeen in 2004. In the UK, it was published with the title Heaven Sent. It was the final novel in the series until the publication of Remembrance in 2016.

== Plot summary ==
Suze struggles to continue her mediator activity with the presence of Paul Slater, who is now giving her mediator lessons. When Paul finds a way to time travel, another gift all shifters share, he tells Suze that he plans on going back to Jesse's time to save him from his murder, thus altering time so that Suze and Jesse will never meet, and allowing Paul to have Suze to himself.

When Paul finally "shifts" and travels through the fourth dimension, Suze follows him back to Jesse's time, and they hide in a nearby barn. The next morning, Paul binds and gags her before going to find Felix Diego, Jesse's murderer. Just when she gives up and convinces herself that Jesse deserves to live, the living Jesse stumbles upon her in the barn and unties her. Suze tries to convince him that she is a mediator from the future and that he is in danger, telling him that Felix Diego is out to kill him and explaining how they met 150 years after his death. At first, he thinks she is delusional and is angered by her accusations about Maria and Diego, but is convinced when Suze mentions his dream of becoming a doctor, something he had never told anyone. He asks why she traveled back to save him and, unable to confess her love, she simply says that what happened to him wasn't right. When Paul returns, he attempts to convince Jesse that Diego is dangerous and he should escape, but Jesse insists that he will stop Diego, prompting Paul to lose interest. Jesse again asks Suze why she is helping him, and she responds that his is a "special" case.

Diego arrives, and he and Jesse begin to fight; he takes Suze hostage, threatening to kill her. When Jesse drops his weapon, Diego throws Suze aside and lunges at him; however, Jesse throws Diego off a ledge, snapping his neck. Suze lands on a lantern during her fall, breaking it and starting a fire, and becomes trapped. Jesse jumps through the flames to Suze, despite Paul's protests, and tells her that they have to jump to safety. Paul shifts back to the present, and when Suze and Jesse jump, she shifts as well - only to accidentally bring Jesse back to the present with her, causing him to slip into a coma.

While Jesse's body lies comatose in the hospital, Father D shows up, and Paul and Suze explain what happened. Father D tells a guilt-ridden Paul to make amends with his grandfather, and tells Suze not to be too hard on him. He reminds her that Jesse would have had to leave her one-day anyway since he was a ghost, and that saving him in the past would have been a better option. As Suze begins to cry, Jesse's ghost returns. She explains how she went back in time and successfully prevented his murder, but since she accidentally brought him into the present, he will die again. Just as he leans in to give her a final kiss, his hand brushes his body's leg, and he begins to glow, before being sucked into the body and disappearing. Believing Jesse to be gone forever, Suze begins to weep. Father D begins to comfort her, when Jesse suddenly awakes from his coma, his body and soul having been reunited.

In the final chapter, Jesse, now alive and human in the 21st century, takes Suze to her winter formal. She reconciles with Paul, and Jesse and Suze share a dance. When Suze catches a glimpse of her father's ghost, she excuses herself from Jesse; he tells her to 'be good' before passing on to his afterlife. When Jesse comes and asks if he is gone, she realizes that he is now also a mediator, and they embrace.
