= How to Be Popular =

2006 novel by Meg Cabot

How to Be popular
- Author: Meg Cabot
- Language: English
- Genre: Young adult novel
- Publisher: HarperCollins
- Publication date: July 2006
- Publication place: United States
- Media type: Print (Hardback & Paperback)
- Pages: 288 pp (first edition, hardback)
- ISBN: 0-06-088012-0 (first edition, hardback)
- OCLC: 63164844
- LC Class: PZ7.C11165 Ho 2006

How to Be Popular is a young adult novel written by Meg Cabot. How to Be Popular is written as a stand-alone book. It was published in July 2006 in the United States. It has since been published in 14 other countries.

== Plot summary ==
Steph Landry has been the target of jokes since sixth grade when she spilt a red Super Big Gulp on Lauren Moffat's white D&G skirt. In response, Lauren coined the phrase "Don't be such a Steph Landry" to ensure Steph never lives it down. As time has passed people have forgotten both the incident and the individual, but the phrase is widely used in the small town. This has caused Steph to feel like a social pariah. Steph has since been content to hang out with her best friends Jason and Becca, also social outcasts, but as she enters the eleventh grade, she wants more out of high school. Luckily, she finds a copy of an old book titled none other than How to be Popular while cleaning out Jason's grandmother's attic.

The book is full of useful tips. She follows the book's advice and begins the school year with flat-ironed hair and a new attitude. Steph is determined to be confident and enthusiastic about school. She sits with new people at lunch and organizes a talent auction. Steph does not anticipate Lauren's anger at her sudden rise in popularity, or Jason's confusion and shock at her behaviour. As her popularity grows, Steph is forced to make difficult choices about who and what is truly important to her. A minor plot arch of the impending wedding of Jason's grandmother and Steph's grandfather. Steph's mother is against the wedding and causes familial contention. Steph's mother's sixth pregnancy also plays out as a minor plot line.

== Format ==
How to Be Popular is in the form of a diary from the perspective of Steph Landry. Each diary entry begins with a time and date. The diary format means that Steph Landry is both the narrator as well as the writer for this story. Each event is told through her eyes as she reflects upon them. The reader is able to understand exactly how the character thinks and feels in the intimate form of a diary. The format, therefore, creates a connection between the reader and Steph but it also makes her an unreliable narrator. Each event is told with a view skewed towards the main character because the format is a personal retelling. Meg Cabot has written in this format for several other books including her The Princess Diaries series.

== Themes ==
How to Be Popular utilizes many themes that are common among Meg Cabot's writings. The overlying theme is one of popularity and acceptance. Throughout the book many characters try to tell Steph that popularity is not as important as individuality. In the end Steph realizes this idea of individuality is far better than the popularity that she has been striving for. Many of Meg Cabot's books also try to expose the problems of conformity to achieve acceptance and popularity. The author often tries to expose the importance of staying true to yourself. Throughout the novel several characters are exposed to this idea and the main conclusion shares this message of individuality.

Other themes include romance (and the idea of The One), sexuality, parental irresponsibility, friendship, and finance. These themes are hallmarks of YA literature. This book explores these themes as part of Steph's struggle to find her place and herself.

== Reception ==
"Cabot deserves her reputation as one of teen chick lit's most entertaining authors. This endearingly funny book looks at the pain of feeling unpopular. Steph and Jason's friendship will have readers (books too) laughing and rooting for her to see what is right in front of her. Public and high school libraries will definitely want to add it to their collection." - VOYA

"A heartwarming, funny tale" - The Daily Telegraph

New York Public Library Books for the Teen Age Award

== Awards ==
- How to Be Popular spent 9 weeks on the NYT best seller list for Children's Chapter Books
- It is also a Publishers Weekly and a USA Today Best Seller
- It has been a Book Sense pick
- It was selected in 2007 as a "Book for Teen Age" by New York Public Library
