= Darkest Hour (Cabot novel) =

Novel by Meg Cabot

- First edition cover
- Author: Meg Cabot
- Language: English
- Series: The Mediator
- Genre: Young adult novel
- Publisher: Pocket Books
- Publication date: 2001
- Publication place: United States
- Media type: Print
- ISBN: 0-06-072514-1
- Preceded by: Reunion
- Followed by: Haunted

Darkest Hour is a young adult novel written by Meg Cabot. It is the fourth part of The Mediator series. The novel was first published in 2001 and was the last of the series to appear under the pseudonym Jenny Carroll. In the UK, it was published with the title Young Blood.

== Synopsis ==
Suze Simon is forced to work a summer job by her stepfather, Andy. She becomes a babysitter at the Pebble Beach Hotel and Golf Resort, where her usual charge is moody eight-year-old Jack Slater. Suze soon realizes that Jack is miserable because he is a mediator like her, and teaches him that ghosts do not mean to do any harm, but just want help to go to the afterlife. This cheers him up greatly and begins to bring him out of his shell. His older brother, Paul, is impressed by the change in his brother's behaviour and asks Suze to join them for dinner, but she refuses and avoids talking to him.

Suze's routine is interrupted when Andy and her stepbrother Brad, while renovating the backyard, dig up letters from a person named Maria de Silva to her fiance, Hector de Silva. Suze realizes that these letters belonged to Jesse, but she is threatened by Maria's ghost, who does not want anyone to find the letters and starts harassing Suze's family. Suze begins to fear that if they find Jesse's remains in the backyard, he will move on to the next world and leave her. She attempts to bring the letters to the Carmel Historical Center, where the conservator, Dr. Clive Clemmings, expresses his belief that Jesse was not murdered but ran away from his wedding. Suze notices Maria's picture and a portrait of Jesse in the museum.

The following day, Suze is confronted by the police, who inform her that Clemmings is dead and Hector de Silva's portrait is missing. Paul stops them from questioning her further, saying that he can "attract more flies with honey rather than vinegar", and she finally agrees to go on a date with him. As Suze returns home from the date, Andy and Brad unearth Jesse's remains in the backyard. Suze reassures herself when she can't find Jesse's ghost, hoping that he is only away for a time. Jack then calls her to inform her of his successful exorcism of the "ghost who was bothering Suze" for a long time.

Horrified, Suze attempts to sneak out of the house to find out more, but is attacked by Maria de Silva and Felix Diego, Maria's late husband, who helped to murder Jesse. They try to kill her, but only give her a concussion by throwing her in the backyard hole. The next day, Suze orders Jack to exorcise her. She believes that if she finds Jesse in the otherworld, she can bring him back. Father Dominic tries to stop Suze, but eventually relents to a 'proper Catholic exorcism' in the Mission. Suze is given thirty minutes to find Jesse and come back, or she will die.

Arriving on the "other side", Suze finds Jesse. He initially thinks that Suze exorcised him and then becomes concerned about her safety, attempting to bring her back. However, they become lost because Maria has arrived at the Mission and cut the rope connecting Suze to the living world. Paul, who is revealed as a mediator, appears and taunts them. Suze realizes that Paul has been working with Maria and Felix, using their date to stop her from preventing Jesse's exorcism. Jesse, furious with Paul's selfish outlook on the mediator "gift", punches him. They barely make it back to the Mission, only to find Maria and Felix Diego attacking Father Dom. Suze manages to exorcize Maria and Felix, and Jesse decides to stay in the living world.

The Slaters leave the hotel soon afterwards, leaving Suze a large tip, and Paul leaves her a particularly cryptic letter. As Suze goes up, she finds Jesse wanting to talk. She refuses, for fear of confessing her feelings, but Jesse kisses her.

== Reception ==
On behalf of School Library Journal, Debbie Stewart criticized Darkest Hour for its numerous coincidences and the fact that "almost every male in this book is a 'hottie'". Despite this, Stewart found that "the plot development is steady and, if not always believable, it is satisfying". She recommended the novel for fans of R. L. Stine's Fear Street and Buffy the Vampire Slayer.
