= Ransom My Heart =

Novel by Meg Cabot

- Author: Mia Thermopolis; Meg Cabot
- Language: English
- Genre: Young adult literature
- Publisher: William Morrow and Company
- Publication date: January 6, 2009
- Publication place: United States
- ISBN: 978-0061700071

Ransom My Heart is a romance novel by American author Meg Cabot. It was released in the United States on January 6, 2009, concurrently with the novel Forever Princess. The book is, according to The Princess Diaries series, written by Mia Thermopolis as her senior project, where she told her friends at first that it was a book about Genovian olive oil. It was accepted for publishing during Forever Princess, the tenth book in the Princess Diaries Series.

== Plot ==
Finnula Crais, a skilled huntress and the daughter of a miller, agrees to help her sister Mellana raise a dowry after Mellana becomes pregnant and spends her savings on frivolities. Their plan is to kidnap a wealthy man for ransom, and Finnula targets Hugo Fitzstephen, newly returned from the Crusades to claim his inheritance. Unaware of his true identity as lord of the lands she has been poaching, Finnula ambushes Hugo and takes him prisoner during his travels.

Hugo, amused by his captor’s boldness, conceals his true identity by calling himself Hugh Fitzwilliam. Over the course of their journey, he grows increasingly attracted to Finnula, who resists his advances while struggling with her own feelings. Despite her initial resolve, their relationship deepens, and they eventually become intimate. Upon their arrival in the village, Hugo reveals his true identity as lord of Stephensgate, and Finnula learns that she had once been briefly married to his late father, Lord Geoffrey.

Despite the shock of these revelations, Hugo insists on marrying Finnula. Their union quickly makes her lady of the manor, though tensions with Hugo’s cousin, Reginald Laroche, and his daughter Isabella soon escalate. Assassination attempts against Hugo suggest a conspiracy, and suspicion falls on Finnula when he is shot with her own arrows. Though confined by the sheriff for her supposed safety, she secretly investigates and discovers that the Laroches, aided by Hugo’s squire Peter, are behind the schemes.

Finnula tracks them to Wolf Cave, where the villains hold Hugo’s young son Jamie hostage. Reginald admits to orchestrating Lord Geoffrey’s death and plotting against Hugo, before challenging him to a duel. Though weakened by injury, Hugo defeats Reginald, who is taken into custody rather than executed. Finnula and Hugo reconcile, each forgiving the other’s past deceptions.

Six months later, Mellana has given birth, Laroche has been executed, and Isabella and Peter have fled into exile. Finnula, now pregnant, manages the estate alongside Hugo, who has become a respected earl. Their partnership is cemented by mutual affection and Finnula’s unorthodox independence, which continues to challenge but also delight her husband.

== Characters ==
=== Finnula Crais ===
Is the youngest daughter, she has five other sisters and one brother. Finnula is also called Finn and also goes under Fair Finn. She is a very good markswoman and prefers to wear men's clothing. She feels that Reginald Laroche is using the serfs injustice and uses her markswoman's skill to kill the game on the estate and gives the kill to the serfs so they don't die of starvation since, if her marriage to Lord Geoffrey had been valid, she would be their Ladyship. Though she had no say in the marriage, she vowed to protect her vassals. After Lord Geoffrey died, she was not in love with him but did not like the thought of marriage. Because of her older sister Mellana's situation she takes it upon herself in getting money for her sister's dowry to Jack Mallory, a troubadour who sings the worst of songs, which is how she met Hugo after noticing he could be worth much for ransom. During the trip to the village, she falls in love with Lord Hugo and beds him, making her officially not a virgin. She is known to be courageous, loyal, to be handy with sharp objects, have amazing aim with a bow and quiver, and good hunting skills. She is described to have red hair, misty gray eyes, and fair skin.

=== Hugo Fitzstephen ===
Is the new Earl of Stephensgate. He has been absent in England for the past ten years fighting in the Holy Land for possession of Jerusalem. Back now in England he only wants to return home. He doesn't want to kill anyone and is plainly just tired of fighting. He finds Finnula to be a whole different type of woman and seems to never have met any woman of her kind before. He is described to have blond hair, hazel-green eyes, and when he had a beard, he looked old enough to be Finn's father and like a demented hermit.
