= Jinx (Cabot novel) =

Novel by Meg Cabot

- Front cover of first edition
- Author: Meg Cabot
- Language: English
- Genre: Young adult novel
- Publisher: HarperTeen
- Publication date: 2007-07-31
- Publication place: United States
- Media type: Print
- Pages: 262 pp (first edition)
- ISBN: 0-06-083764-0 (first edition)
- OCLC: 81854593
- LC Class: PZ7.C11165 Jin 2007

Jinx is a 2007 young adult novel.

== Plot summary ==
Jean "Jinx" Honeychurch is a sixteen-year-old girl from Iowa. Being certain that she was born with bad luck, she goes to stay with her Aunt Evelyn and Uncle Ted in Manhattan, New York because her ex-boyfriend is stalking her.

Her cousin Tory is convinced that Jean must join her coven of witches to add to their power. Jean denies being a witch, and refuses to join them. This angers Tory, causing her to seek payback. Jean also meets a guy both she and Tory have affection for, Zack. This along with the witch thing puts Tory in a blind rage and she decides to plot against Jinx in more ways than the walls of the preppy Chapman, where they all attend high school.

At a school dance Tory flies Jean's ex to town, which sends Jean into a panic attack. She then returns home and Tory ties Jean up to cut her and drink her blood and take Jean's powers. Zack comes out and rescues Jean, who exposes Tory for what she really is. Then Tory is sent to boot camp and Jean and Zack end up dating.
