= Meg Cabot =

American novelist

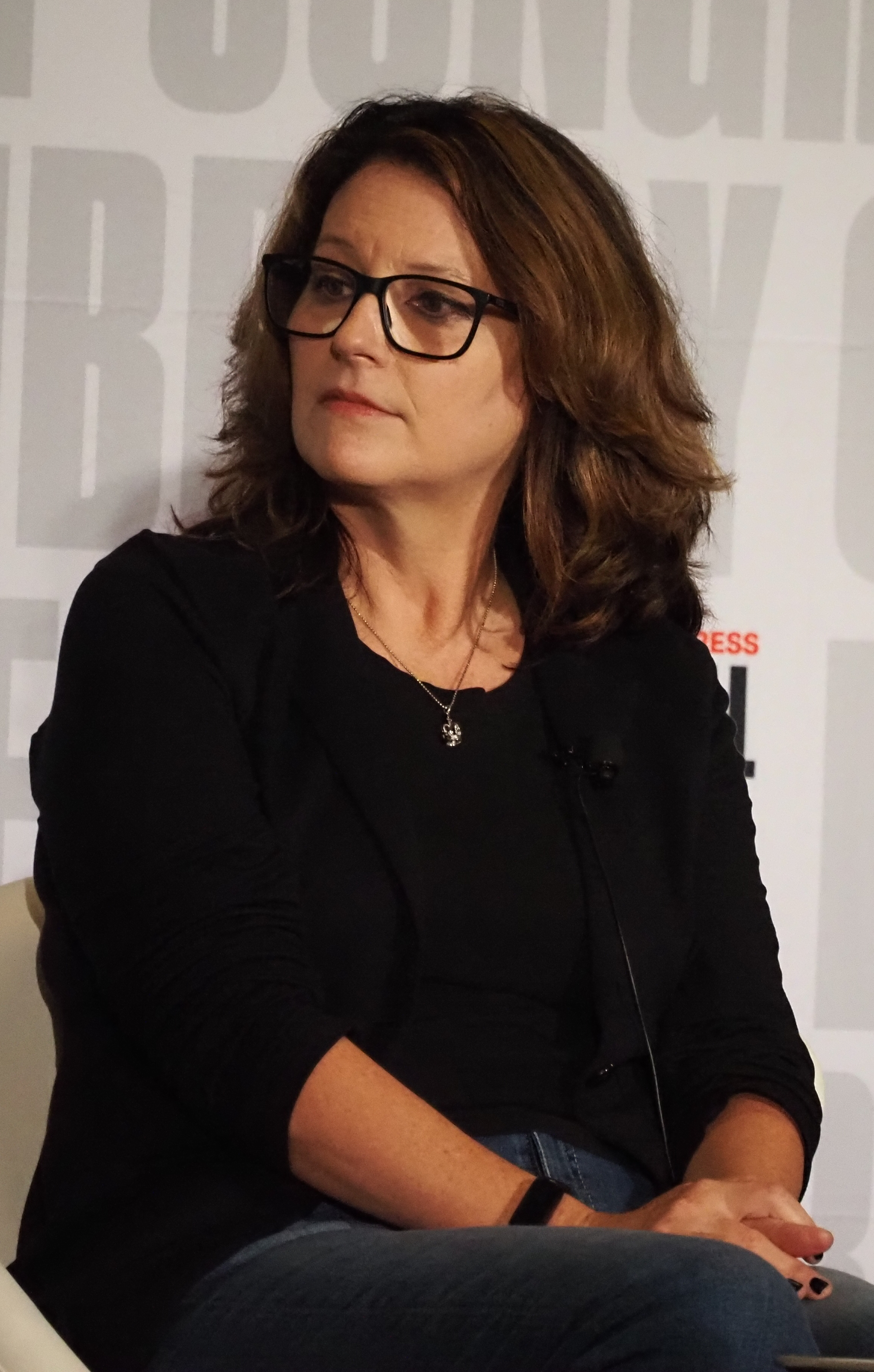
- Cabot in 2026
- Born: Meggin Patricia Cabot; February 1, 1967 (age 59); Bloomington, Indiana, U.S.
- Education: Indiana University (BA)
- Occupation: Writer
- Spouse: Benjamin D. Egnatz (m. 1993)
- Writing career
- Pen name: Meg Cabot; Patricia Cabot; Jenny Carroll
- Genres: Chick-lit, mystery, romance
- Notable works: The Princess Diaries; The Mediator; Avalon High
- Website: megcabot.com

Meggin Patricia Cabot (born February 1, 1967) is an American novelist. She has written and published over 80 novels of young adult and adult fiction and is best known for her young adult series The Princess Diaries, which was later adapted by Walt Disney Pictures into two feature films. Cabot has been the recipient of numerous book awards, including the New York Public Library Books for the Teen Age, the American Library Association Quick Pick for Reluctant Readers, the Tennessee Volunteer State TASL Book Award, the Book Sense Pick, the Evergreen Young Adult Book Award, and the IRA/CBC Young Adult Choice. She has also had number-one New York Times bestsellers, and more than 25 million copies of her books are in print across the world.

== Early life and career ==
Meggin Patricia Cabot was born on February 1, 1967, in Bloomington, Indiana. After she graduated from Indiana University, Cabot moved to New York City, with the original aim of pursuing a career as an illustrator. However, she soon quit this job and started working as an assistant manager of the freshman dormitory at New York University.

== Personal life ==
Meg Cabot married financial writer and poet Benjamin D. Egnatz on April 1, 1993. Their wedding date, April Fool's Day, was a deliberate play on her husband's belief that only fools get married in the first place. The wedding was an elopement in Italy. Her novel Every Boy's Got One is loosely based on her elopement.

She has cats, Henrietta (a one-eyed cat; 1993–2013), and Gem, about whom she often blogs.

After living in Indiana, California, New York, and France, she now lives in Key West, Florida with her husband.

== Publications ==
=== Children's novels ===
==== Allie Finkle's Rules for Girls ====
Year	Title	Notes
2008	Moving Day	
2008	The New Girl	
2009	Best Friends and Drama Queens	
2010	Stage Fright	
2011	Glitter Girls and the Great Fake Out	
2012	Blast From the Past	

The Allie Finkle's Rules for Girls series is about 9-year-old Allie Finkle, who has to contend with moving from her suburban home to an old Victorian house, starting a new school, and making new friends.

==== Olivia Grace series ====
Year	Title	Notes
2015	From the Notebooks of a Middle School Princess	
2016	Royal Wedding Disaster	
2016	Royal Day Out	Free e-short
2017	Royal Crush	
2018	Royal Crown	

From the Notebooks of a Middle School Princess is a series for "tween" readers featuring Princess Mia's half-sister, Olivia Grace. The books are illustrated by Cabot.

=== Young adult ===
==== The Princess Diaries series ====
The Princess Diaries series is the most critically acclaimed series written by Meg Cabot and has been published in more than 40 countries. The first book in the series was published in October 2000. The series spent 48 weeks on the New York Times Children's Series Best Sellers List, and was sold to publishers in 37 foreign countries. In 2021, Time magazine named The Princess Diaries one of the 100 Best YA Books of All Time.

In 2001 and 2004, respectively, the series was brought to the big screen by Walt Disney Pictures as The Princess Diaries and The Princess Diaries 2: Royal Engagement starring Anne Hathaway and Julie Andrews.

In the UK and Australia, the books are published under titles based on the volume number (e.g.: Mia Goes Fourth).

Year	Title	UK, AUS, NZ title	Notes
2000	The Princess Diaries, Volume I	The Princess Diaries	Time's 100 Best YA Books of All Time
2001	Volume II: Princess in the Spotlight	The Princess Diaries: Take Two	
2002	Volume III: Princess in Love	The Princess Diaries: Third Time Lucky	#1 on NY Times Best Seller List
2003	Volume IV: Princess in Waiting	The Princess Diaries: Mia Goes Fourth	#1 on NY Times Best Seller List
2003	Volume IV and 1/2: Project Princess		
2004	Volume V: Princess in Pink	The Princess Diaries: Give Me Five	
2005	Volume VI: Princess in Training	The Princess Diaries: Sixsational	
2004	Volume VI and 1/2: The Princess Present		
2006	Volume VII: Party Princess	The Princess Diaries: Seventh Heaven	
2006	Volume VII and 1/2: Sweet Sixteen Princess		
2006	Volume VII and 3/4: Valentine Princess		
2006	Volume VIII: Princess on the Brink	The Princess Diaries: After Eight	
2007	Volume IX: Princess Mia	The Princess Diaries: To The Nines	
2009	Volume X: Forever Princess	The Princess Diaries: Ten Out Of Ten	
2015	Volume XI: Royal Wedding	The Princess Diaries: Royal Weddling	
2023	Volume XII: The Quarantine Princess	The Quarantine Princess Diaries	

Illustrated by Chelsey McLaren:

- Princess Lessons (March 2003)
- Perfect Princess (March 2004)
- Holiday Princess (November 2005)

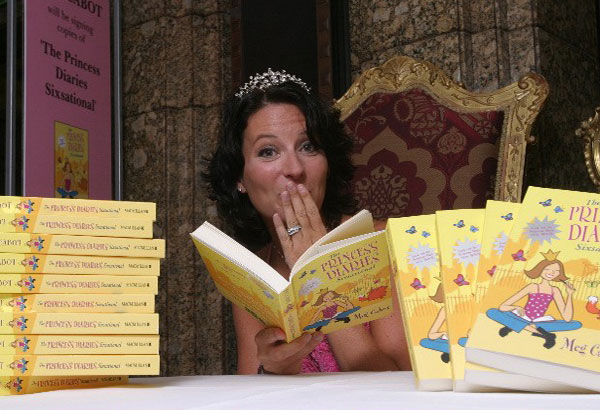
Cabot at a book signing of The Princess Diaries

On January 6, 2009, a companion book to Volume X: Forever Princess titled Ransom My Heart was published under the name Princess of Genovia, Mia Thermopolis by Avon Books, the adult division of HarperCollins, the Princess Diaries series publisher. All author proceeds from the novel, which was printed on 100% recycled paper, go to Greenpeace.

Cabot has published a spin-off middle grade series titled From the Notebooks of a Middle School Princess, taken from the point of view of Mia's long-lost sister, Olivia Grace. As listed above, there are four books in the series.

==== The Mediator series ====
Year	Title	Alternate title	Notes
2000	Shadowland	Love You to Death	Originally released under the pseudonym Jenny Carroll
2001	Ninth Key	High Stakes	Originally released under the pseudonym Jenny Carroll
2001	Reunion	Mean Spirits	Originally released under the pseudonym Jenny Carroll
2001	Darkest Hour	Young Blood	Originally released under the pseudonym Jenny Carroll
2003	Haunted	Grave Doubts	
2005	Twilight	Heaven Sent	
2016	Proposal: A Mediator Novella		
2016	Remembrance		

The Mediator series is about 16-year-old Susannah "Suze" Simon. Suze is a mediator whose role is to help ghosts finish their business on earth so they can pass on to the afterlife. To this end, she can see, touch, communicate with, hit, punch, and "kick ghost butt" when she must. The series begins just after Suze's widowed mother marries Andy Ackerman, so Suze has moved to Carmel, California, to live in an old house complete with three stepbrothers. To make matters worse, her bedroom is haunted by an attractive male ghost named Jesse de Silva, who died 150 years earlier. Suze remembers that back in New York, a fortune teller had told her that she was a mediator (which proved correct) and that she would only fall in love once, but it would last for an eternity.

The first four books were originally credited to the pseudonym Jenny Carroll (this was when Cabot was working with different publishing houses). Haunted was the first title to have Meg Cabot's name on it. The first four books were later reprinted under Cabot's real name in 2005 with new cover art when Twilight was released in hardcover. The UK titles for the series were: Shadowland – Love You to Death, Ninth Key – High Stakes, Reunion – Mean Spirits, Darkest Hour – Young Blood, Haunted – Grave Doubts, and Twilight – Heaven Sent.

In December 2010, HarperTeen published an omnibus titled The Mediator: Shadowland and Ninth Key.

==== 1-800-WHERE-R-U series ====
Year	Title	Notes
2001	When Lightning Strikes	Originally written under Cabot's pseudonym, Jenny Carroll
2001	Code Name Cassandra	Originally written under Cabot's pseudonym, Jenny Carroll
2002	Safe House	Originally written under Cabot's pseudonym, Jenny Carroll
2002	Sanctuary	Originally written under Cabot's pseudonym, Jenny Carroll
2006	Missing You	

This series revolves around Jessica Mastriani, an ordinary 16-year-old girl given extraordinary psychic powers after being struck by lightning. Her powers allow her to know the exact location of missing children; after seeing a picture of a person, they appear in her dreams. The first four books take place over less than a year and chronicle her attempts to help missing children while trying to avoid the scrutiny of the federal government. The fifth book, published four years after the fourth book, picks up the storyline after Jess has turned 19. Over the course of the book, Jess is romantically involved with Rob Wilkins, a boy from the wrong side of the tracks.

The first four books were originally written under Cabot's pseudonym, Jenny Carroll. The books were re-released in 2004 under Cabot's real name. Cabot was unhappy with the discontinuation; she stated that she wanted to take the series up to eight books. Her current publishing house agreed to publish one more installment. Missing You was released in December 2006 and that was the end of the series.

The 1-800-WHERE-R-YOU series was the basis for the television show Missing, which aired on the Lifetime cable network for three seasons from 2003 to 2006.

The series was reprinted in the US in an omnibus edition and retitled Vanished.

==== All-American Girl series ====
Year	Title	Notes
2002	All American Girl	#1 NY Times Best Seller
2005	Ready or Not: An All-American Girl Novel	#1 NY Times Best Seller

The series revolves around Samantha Madison, a Washington, D.C. native, who, while skipping her after-school art class, saves the life of the president, and becomes a national hero. The two books are about her rise to fame and her love life with the president's son, David, who appears to want to take their relationship to the next level in the second book. There is also a short story called "Another All-American Girl" in the anthology Our White House: Looking In, Looking Out, about Samantha's experience in the White House.

==== Avalon High series ====
Year	Title	Notes
2005	Avalon High	
2007	The Merlin Prophecy	Avalon High: Coronation (three-book manga series)
2008	Homecoming	Avalon High: Coronation (three-book manga series)
2009	Hunter's Moon	Avalon High: Coronation (three-book manga series)

Avalon High is a contemporary retelling of the King Arthur tale set in a modern high school. Avalon High: Coronation is a sequel to the first Avalon High novel, and is part of a new partnership HarperCollins brokered with Tokyopop. It was released as a three-book manga series, called Avalon High: Coronation. The first manga, titled The Merlin Prophecy, was released on July 3, 2007, and was drawn by manga artist Jinky Coronado, creator of the Banzai Girl manga. She also illustrated the other two manga.

The Avalon High film was shown on Disney Channel on November 12, 2010. Britt Robertson played Ally (Elaine), while Gregg Sulkin played Will.

==== The Airhead trilogy ====
Year	Title	Notes
2008	Airhead	
2009	Being Nikki	
2010	Runaway	

This three-book series is about Emerson Watts, an overachieving high-school student. She wakes up after an accident and discovers that her brain has been transplanted into the body of teen supermodel Nikki Howard. Now, she is no longer judged by her grades, but by her looks, and she has to fight the worldwide corporation, Stark Enterprises, if she wants to find out what happened to her old life and protect her friends and family.

==== The Abandon trilogy ====
Year	Title	Notes
2011	Abandon	
2012	Underworld	
2013	Awaken	

The Abandon trilogy follows a reimagining of the Greek myth of Persephone and Hades set in modern times.

==== Stand-alone young adult novels ====
Year	Title	Notes
2002	Nicola and the Viscount	
2003	Victoria and the Rogue	
2004	Teen Idol	#1 NY Times Best Seller
2006	How to Be Popular	
2006	Pants on Fire	UK title: Tommy Sullivan is a Freak
2007	Jinx	

=== Adult novels ===
==== Boy series ====
Year	Title	Notes
2002	The Boy Next Door	
2004	Boy Meets Girl	
2005	Every Boy's Got One	
2016	The Boy is Back	

These books are loosely connected romantic comedies told in emails, IMs, and brief journal entries. The Boy Next Door was a Kelly Ripa Book Club Pick on Live! with Regis and Kelly.

==== Heather Wells series ====
Year	Title	Notes
2005	Size 12 is Not Fat	
2006	Size 14 is Not Fat Either	
2007	Big Boned	
2012	Size 12 and Ready to Rock	
2013	The Bride Wore Size 12	

The Heather Wells series is an adult mystery series that features former pop star, Heather Wells. Heather was once a teen star but was fired by her recording company when she asked to sing songs she had written instead of the ones they composed for her. The book opens just after Heather has gotten a job as a residential house coordinator at New York College and quickly discovers that young girls in the dorm are being murdered.

The second book was originally titled Phat Chick, but this was changed by the publishers to It's Not Over Until the Size 12 Chick Sings, and finally, Size 14 is Not Fat Either, which continued Heather's amateur sleuthing adventures.

The third book in the series is published under the title Size Doesn't Matter in Australia and Great Britain.(In other countries, such as the U.S. and Canada, it was titled Big Boned.) In Size Doesn't Matter, Heather solves another mystery and is involved in a love triangle with Tad, her boyfriend, and Cooper, whom she secretly loves, but who rejected her.

In March 2008 the series was contracted for two additional books, which were released in 2012 and 2013.

==== Queen of Babble series ====
Year	Title	Notes
2006	Queen of Babble	
2007	Queen of Babble in the Big City	
2008	Queen of Babble Gets Hitched	

The main character of this romantic comedy, Lizzie Nichols, is a recent college grad who isn't sure what she wants out of life. All she knows is that she can't keep a secret, even her own. This causes her many romantic, friendship, and work-related problems, especially after moving to New York City after graduating from college.

==== Insatiable series ====
Year	Title	Notes
2010	Insatiable	
2011	Overbite	

The first book, Insatiable, was released on June 8, 2010, and became an instant New York Times bestseller. This series is a modern retelling of Bram Stoker's Dracula, but the main character, Meena Harper, can foretell people's death. She's being forced by the television show for which she works to write vampires into the plot due to their popularity. Meena, however, hates vampires (she doesn't believe in them, and doesn't like how they always go after and kill girls). This complicates things when she finds out from Alaric Wulf, a demon-hunter with a secret unit of the Vatican called the Palatine Guard, that vampires are attacking girls all over her native New York City, and that her new boyfriend might be one of them: Lucien Antonescu, Dracula's son, the Prince of Darkness. A sequel to Insatiable called Overbite was released on July 5, 2011.

==== The Little Bridge Series ====
Year	Title	Notes
2019	Bridal Boot Camp	
2019	No Judgments	
2020	No Offense	
2021	No Words	

Little Bridge Island is a series of romance books written for adults which all take place on a fictional island located in the Florida Keys. Each book in the series explored the lives of different characters who live on the island.

==== Historical romance novels ====
Year	Title	Notes
1998	Where Roses Grow Wild	Written under Cabot's pseudonym Patricia Cabot
1999	Portrait of My Heart	Written under Cabot's pseudonym Patricia Cabot
1999	An Improper Proposal	Written under Cabot's pseudonym Patricia Cabot
2000	A Little Scandal	Written under Cabot's pseudonym Patricia Cabot
2000	Lady of Skye	Written under Cabot's pseudonym Patricia Cabot
2001	Educating Caroline	Written under Cabot's pseudonym Patricia Cabot
2002	Kiss the Bride	Written under Cabot's pseudonym Patricia Cabot
2009	Ransom My Heart	Written by Amelia "Mia" Thermopolis, Princess of Genovia, with help from Meg Cabot

=== Other works ===
- She Went All the Way, December 2002 (as Meg Cabot)

She Went All the Way is a romantic comedy novel with elements of a (mild) thriller. The plot focuses on a recently dumped screenwriter, Lou (a woman) whose actor-ex elopes two-weeks post-breakup—with someone else. The recently married bride also unceremoniously dumped her boyfriend, Jack, an A-list actor. When Lou is assigned the fourth installment in Jack's major movie franchise, they not only meet but share a wacky adventure, with moments of genuine danger.

==== Graphic novels ====
- Black Canary: Ignite (October 2019; illustrated by Cara McGee)

==== Screenplays ====
- Early versions of the screenplay for Disney's Ice Princess, released in 2005, were written by Meg Cabot.

==== Short stories ====
Year	Title	Where published	Notes	Ref
December 2000	"The Christmas Captive"	The adult romance anthology A Season in the Highlands	Written under Cabot's pseudonym Patricia Cabot	
August 2003	"Girl's Guide to New York through the Movies"	Metropolis Found: New York is Book Country 25th Anniversary Collection		
October 2003	"Kate the Great"	Thirteen: Thirteen Stories That Capture the Agony and Ecstasy of Being Thirteen		
January 2004	"You Rock, Jen Greenley"	The short story collection Short Stories		
September 2004	"Party Planner"	The adult short story collection Girls' Night In		
August 2005	"Connie "Hunter" Williams, Psychic Teacher"	The teen short story collection Friends: Stories About New Friends, Old Friends, and Unexpectedly True Friends		
April 2006	"Allie Finkle's Rules for Girls"	The CosmoGIRL! short story collection Shining On		
June 2006	"Reunion"	The adult short story collection Girls' Night Out		
Spring 2007	"Cry, Linda, Cry: Judy Blume's Blubber and The Cruelest Thing in the World"	Everything I Needed to Know About Being a Girl I Learned From Judy Blume		
May 2007	"The Exterminator's Daughter"	Prom Nights From Hell		
July 2007	"Ask Annie"	Midnight Feast		
September 2008	"Another All-American Girl"	Our White House, Looking In, Looking Out		
February 2009	"Where's My Belt?"	My Little Red Book		
July 2009	"Are You There, God? It's Me, Margaret"	Shelf Discovery: The Teen Classics We Never Stopped Reading		
May 2010	"Legacy'	Queen of Teen		
	"Every Girl's Dream"		A short story written by Cabot out of the Mediator series	
September 2010	"Princess Prettypants"	The anthology Zombie vs. Unicorns		
September 2010	"The Night Hunter"	The anthology Fear: 13 Stories of Horror and Suspense		
August 2011	"Falling in Lust at the Jersey Shore"	Cosmo's Sexiest Stories Ever: Three Naughty Tales		
September 2011	"The Protectionist"	The young adult short story collection What You Wish For		
August 2012	"Out of the Blue"	The anthology Foretold: 14 Tales of Prophecy and Prediction		
June 2013	"The Model and The Monster"	O Livro das Princesas (Book of Princesses)	Only in Brazil	
October 2017	"Beru Whitesun Lars"	The collection From A Certain Point of View: 40 Stories Celebrating 40 Years of Star Wars		

=== Adaptations ===
- In 2001, the film version of The Princess Diaries was released. It starred Anne Hathaway as Amelia "Mia" Thermopolis and Julie Andrews as Clarisse Renaldi. A sequel was released in 2004, The Princess Diaries 2: Royal Engagement.
- A Canadian television series based on the 1-800-WHERE-R-YOU series titled Missing was broadcast on the A and W Network in Canada from 2003 to 2006. It was broadcast on Lifetime in the United States.
- The Disney Channel original movie version of Avalon High premiered in late fall 2010. the film starred Gregg Sulkin as A. William Wagner and Britt Robertson as Allie Pennington (Ellie Harrison)

== Awards ==
- The Princess Diaries was voted one of Time magazine's 100 Best YA Books of All Time.
- Indiana University Distinguished Alumni Award (2008)
- Top Ten Quick Picks for Reluctant Readers selection, Best Book selection, American Library Association, and New York Public Library Teen Book for the New Millennium citation, all 2001, all for The Princess Diaries
- Edgar Allan Poe Award nomination, best young adult category, Mystery Writers of America, 2003, for Safe House
- The Princess Diaries was voted "one of the nation's 100 best-loved novels" by the British public as part of the Big Read, British Broadcasting Corporation, 2003.
- Airhead nominated for Teen Choice Book of the Year, 2009

== Charity ==
Meg has teamed with the Make-a-Wish Foundation and the Starlight Children's Foundation to mentor seriously and terminally ill children.

Events

- In March 2012, Meg helped raise money for Authors for Henryville to benefit tornado victims in Indiana.
- In 2010, Meg donated proceeds from books purchased at the Kappa Book Fair and Dinner to the Craig Hospital in Denver. The hospital specializes in spinal cord and brain injuries.
- In 2009, Meg held a Tiara Auction to benefit the New York Public Library. Tiaras decorated by celebrities, authors, and designers such as Julie Andrews, Vera Wang, Tommy Hilfiger, Lauren Conrad, Mo Rocca, and Julianne Moore were auctioned and raised over $15,000 for teen programs at the library.

Short stories and books benefitting charities

10% of the author's US proceeds from Quarantine Princess Diaries, published in 2023 will go to Vow for Girls, a global charity that aims to end child marriage.

In 2012, Meg's short story Wooden Animal appeared in Significant Objects, an anthology that benefitted Girls Write Now.

And in 2011, Meg contributed the story The Protectionist to the anthology What You Wish For. One hundred percent of proceeds benefited the UN Refugee Agency, UNHCR, which builds libraries in Darfuri refugee camps in Chad.

All of Meg's proceeds from her story The Exterminator's Daughter, in the anthology Prom Nights From Hell, benefit First Book, a nonprofit organization connecting book publishers and community organizations to provide access to new books for children in need.

All of Meg's proceeds from The Princess Diaries, Volume 4 1/2, Project Princess, go to benefit The Lower Eastside Girls Club of New York City. Editions sold to publishers in 10 countries outside the US benefited local charities in those countries.

All of Meg's proceeds from the novel Ransom My Heart by Mia Thermopolis, Princess of Genovia (with help from Meg Cabot) go to benefit Greenpeace (Ransom My Heart is also printed on recycled paper). The proceeds from sales of Ransom My Heart to publishers in 8 countries have also gone to Mia's favorite charity.

Meg's story The Night Hunter was included in the anthology Fear: 13 Stories of Suspense. All author proceeds from this book benefit the Reading Is Fundamental literacy program for children.

In 2008, Meg contributed a story (Another All-American Girl) to the anthology Our White House: Looking In, Looking Out with all proceeds benefitting the National Children's Book and Literacy Alliance.

Meg's also written short stories for anthologies that have benefited the Teenage Cancer Trust, War Child, No Strings, Lisa Libraries, Kids Company, and the New York Public Libraries, among other organizations.

== Sources ==
- "Meg Cabot." Authors and Artists for Young Adults, Volume 50. Gale Group, 2003. Reproduced in Biography Resource Center. Farmington Hills, Mich.: Thomson Gale. 2006.
- Cabot, Meg (January 30, 2006). "Rumor Control". Meg's Diary. MegCabot.com.
