= Avalon High =

2005 fantasy novel by Meg Cabot

- Author: Meg Cabot
- Language: English
- Genre: Young adult mystery novel
- Publisher: HarperCollins
- Publication date: 27 December 2005
- Publication place: United States
- Media type: Print (hardback & paperback)
- Pages: 304 pp (1st HB)
- ISBN: 978-0-06-075586-7 (1st HB)
- OCLC: 60515267
- LC Class: PZ7.C11165 Ava 2006

Avalon High is a young adult novel by Meg Cabot, published in 2005 targeted for age 12 and up. The book merges a high school setting with elements of medieval fantasy, namely Arthurian legend.

== Plot ==
Elaine "Ellie" Harrison, a self described "tall, geeky" teenage girl going into her junior year of high school, temporarily moves to Annapolis, Maryland with her eccentric parents, who are medieval history professors on sabbatical. One day while running in a nearby park, she comes across a strangely-familiar seeming and extremely attractive teenage boy, who she later sees with two other teens; a guy and a girl.

Upon starting school at the local Avalon High School, she finds out that the handsome and strangely familiar young gentleman is A. William Wagner, known as Will, the most popular guy in school and quarterback of the football team. The other two young people she saw that day in the park are his best friend, Lance Reynolds, the football team's guard, and Jennifer Gold, the stereotypically gorgeous head cheerleader, and Will's girlfriend. Ellie is paired with Lance on a school project in the class of literature teacher named Mr. Morton, but finds Lance to be an unlikable slacker, despite his high social status and sports abilities.

Unexpectedly, Will turns up at Ellie's home, confessing that he also felt she looked familiar when they came across each other at the park, and stays for dinner with her family. Ellie develops a major crush on Will, to whom she feels extremely drawn. She finds out that that Will's father, with whom Will clashes, is a Navy officer who married the wife of his former best friend, who was killed in action at a combat post where he was sent by Will's father. Through this marriage, Will gains a stepbrother - Marco Campbell, a troubled teen who was expelled from Avalon High for attacking a teacher. Ellie meets them all at a post-football game party at Will's house, and accidentally discovers that Lance and Jennifer are having an affair behind Will's back, which the unsettling Marco lets on he knows about too.

The next day, Will invites Ellie to go sailing with Lance, Jennifer and Marco. During a confrontation on the boat, Marco reveals the affair. Marco cryptically refers to Ellie as "the Lily Maid." Will later confesses to Ellie that he is not too troubled or betrayed by the revelation, and hangs out with her for several hours. At school the next day, Ellie is supposed to meet Mr. Morton with her project partner, Lance, but Lance fails to show and Ellie reveals the Will-Jennifer breakup to Mr. Morton. Morton is deeply shaken and orders a bewildered Ellie out.

Ellie later skips class to confront Morton at his home about him being a member of the "Order of the Bear," a fraternal organization who believe that King Arthur will be reincarnated. Morton plans to leave town, revealing that Will, whose full first name is Arthur, is this reincarnation, but that he has already been betrayed by Jennifer and Lance, a reincarnation of Guinevere and Lancelot from Arthurian Legend respectively, and will therefore not have the will to fight off Mordred (Marco) and the forces of evil, as in the original legend where Arthur dies at Mordred's hands. Morton reveals that he tried to reason with Marco once and revealed the truth, which only resulted in Marco embracing the dark side. Ellie, in utter disbelief, is incensed by Morton's desire to give up on the situation and storms out. She understands that her analog is supposed to be Elaine of Astolat, who died of heartbreak over unrequited love over Sir Lancelot (Lance), but harbors no feelings for Lance.

Back at school, Ellie witnesses a confrontation that reveals that Will's purported stepmother is actually his biological mother, making Marco Will's half brother, just as Mordred and Arthur were. A distressed Marco steals Will's father's gun and goes on the run. Ellie assists Will at a final confrontation with Marco by bringing him a medieval sword which her father was studying, revealing that her actual analog is the Lady of the Lake, who provides Arthur with Excalibur in the legend. Afterwards, Ellie and Will get together.

== Characters ==
- Elaine "Ellie" Harrison: the new student at Avalon High—she moved to Annapolis, Maryland from Minnesota and is presumed to represent Elaine of Astolat for most of the novel, though it is revealed later that she plays a different role in the legend, the Lady of the Lake, Arthur's magical protector.
- Arthur William "Will" Wagner Jr.: The son of Admiral Arthur William Wagner Sr., star quarterback for the Avalon High School Fighting Knights. He represents King Arthur.
- Jennifer Gold: a cheerleader and Will's girlfriend who corresponds to Queen Guinevere in the legend of Arthur.
- Lance Reynolds: The Avalon High School football team's guard, who is Will's best friend. Lance corresponds to Lancelot.
- Marco Campbell: Marco is Will's stepbrother, revealed later to be his half-brother. He represents Mordred.
- Mr. Morton: Avalon High School English teacher. He is a member of "The Order of the Bear" and represents Merlin.
- Admiral Arthur William Wagner Sr.: He is Will's father, who corresponds to Uther Pendragon in the legend. He seemingly murders his best friend (by sending him into combat where he was killed) and then marries his wife.
- Jean Wagner: Jean is Admiral Wagner's wife, who married him 6 months after her husband died in combat. Although originally it was believed that she was merely Will's stepmother, it was later revealed (by Mr. Morton) that she was in actuality Will's birth mother. She corresponds to Igraine in the legend.
- Ellie's parents: professors of medieval history on sabbatical. Her mother is writing a book on Elaine, the so-called "lily maid" of Astolat, and her father is writing his on the sword, that Ellie takes to the park and hands to Will during his face-off with Marco, thus revealing herself as the Lady of the Lake. Ellie's parents care about her despite being an embarrassment at times.
- Liz: a minor character and Ellie's first friend at Avalon High. Although unpopular, she loves to gossip and knows information about all the students at the school, especially Will.

== Reception ==
Avalon High reached number 3 on The New York Times' children's best sellers list in January 2006.

== Film adaptation ==
Disney Channel adapted the book as a Disney Channel Original Movie of the same title in 2010, starring Britt Robertson, Gregg Sulkin, Joey Pollari, Devon Graye and Steve Valentine. The movie premiered November 12, 2010. Some parts of the movie are filmed in New Zealand.

The characters in the film are both renamed and have their mythic alter egos swapped, with respect to the book. In the film Allie (Ellie in the book), rather than Will, is King Arthur (but several characters initially believe otherwise); Mr. Moore (Mr. Morton in the book) is in the film Mordred, replacing Marco; and Miles (instead of Moore/Morton) is Merlin. In the film, Marco reveals himself to be a member of the Order of the Bear, and determined to protect Will (believing him to be Arthur), although Allie initially believes Marco to be Mordred. In the film, Mr. Moore reveals that he suspected Allie to be the Lady of the Lake and is shocked that she is Arthur. The climactic battle scene, which in the book takes place in the ravine, in the film occurs in the school theater (which magically becomes a beach). The students are explained as the reincarnations of their alter egos, as opposed to merely corresponding to them. Allie is an only child; she no longer has a brother. Since Will is not Arthur, some connections are eliminated: Will's father is not trying to make Will join the navy; Will does not sail, nor does he have a dog (in the book there are connections to the names of Arthur's dog and boat). Avalon High's team name is the Knights, not Excalibur. Many potentially violent and threatening scenes were removed and scene settings changed to make the movie more appropriate for younger children.

== Avalon High: Coronation ==
Three pseudo-manga volumes have been also released: Coronation Volume 1: The Merlin Prophecy, Coronation Volume 2: Homecoming, and Coronation Volume 3: Hunter's Moon.
