= Ninth Key =

Novel by Meg Cabot

- First edition
- Author: Meg Cabot
- Cover artist: Danilo Ducak
- Language: English
- Series: The Mediator
- Genre: Young adult novel
- Publisher: Pulse
- Publication date: February 2001
- Publication place: United States
- Media type: Print
- Pages: 230 pp
- ISBN: 0-671-78798-5
- OCLC: 56655291
- Preceded by: Shadowland
- Followed by: Reunion

Ninth Key is a novel written by Meg Cabot for teenagers and young adults. It is the second book of The Mediator series. Its alternative title is High Stakes.

== Plot summary ==
At Kelly Prescott's pool party, Suze unknowingly contracts a poison oak rash after falling into some bushes while spying on her stepbrother Dopey. She also shares a slow dance with Tad, a student at a local school. That night, Suze is awoken by the ghost of a woman who starts yelling hysterically. The woman asks Suze to tell "Red" that he did not kill her. Suze does not know who this woman is, or who "Red" is, but the ghost disappears before she has the chance to ask. She later finds out from her friend CeeCee that a local businessman called Thaddeus Beaumont goes by that name.

Suze tries and fails to get in contact with Mr Beaumont. She encounters the ghost of a boy named Timothy, who tells her his parents abandoned his cat, Spike. Suze promises to find the cat and give him a good home. With the pretense that she is a reporter for the school paper, Suze goes to Beaumont's mansion and meets him. She delivers the ghost's message, saying the woman appeared in a dream. Mr Beaumont seems only interested that he wasn't the cause of the woman's death and that Suze was able to speak to her. He is eager to get Suze to summon the spirits of other people he says he has killed. Disconcerted, Suze tries to leave, only to find that she is trapped. She is rescued by Beaumont's secretary Marcus, who escorts her out, believing she was merely playing a prank. As they leave, they encounter Tad, who is Beaumont's son. Recognizing her from the pool party, Tad takes Suze on a coffee date and gives her a ride home; when he drops her off, he kisses her. Their kiss is interrupted by Jesse, who warns Suze to stay away from the Beaumont family.

When Suze explains the situation to Father Dom, he suggests that the strangeness of Mr Beaumont's behavior could mean that he is a vampire. Several days later, Suze retrieves Spike the cat from a field and hides him in her room. CeeCee researches Beaumont upon Suze's request and discovers a string of disappearances linking to his companies. One of the missing women - Mrs Deirdre Fiske - vaguely resembles the ghost who has asked Suze for help. Adam takes them to the house of CeeCee's Aunt Pru, a fortune-teller, who tries to summon Mrs Fiske using Tarot cards. Although the ghost of Mrs Fiske confirms that a Beaumont killed her, Suze realizes she is not the ghost she is looking for.

That evening, Mr Beaumont and Tad invite Suze for dinner at their house. After the meal, Beaumont drugs Tad and tries to talk to Suze about her psychic abilities. Believing he is a vampire, Suze stabs him in the chest with a pencil but fails to kill him. Marcus threatens Suze to never return and to not speak of Beaumont's vampirism, which he claims is a psychosis. Later, CeeCee calls Suze with the revelation that after the death of Tad's mother, Beaumont had handed over most of his business duties to Marcus, who is actually his brother. Tad also calls Suze to apologize, but they have an argument when Tad denies his father's illness and Suze implies Marcus's potential role in the Beaumont killings.

The next morning, Suze is kidnapped by Marcus and his thugs. She tries to escape, but Marcus forces her into Mr Beaumont's office, giving her a swimsuit to change into, and leaves; he plans to kill her and Tad by drowning them in the ocean during a storm. Suze smashes the aquarium in the office when Marcus returns to check on her. When he threatens her with a gun, Suze electrocutes him with a lightbulb from the aquarium. As the building catches fire, Jesse, appears, claiming Suze "called" him, and breaks the window shutters, allowing Tad and Suze to escape the burning building. Marcus remains missing after the incident.

Suze returns home but is grounded by her parents as she is unable to tell them the full story. 'Red' turns out to be the nickname of Suze's stepbrother Doc, and the ghost is Doc's mother. Suze tells Doc his mother's message, and admits that she is a mediator. Tad calls Suze with the news that he is moving to San Francisco while his father recovers, and they break up.
