= Pants on Fire (novel) =

Novel written by Meg Cabot

First edition

Pants on Fire is a young adult novel written by Meg Cabot. It was published in May 2007 in the United States. It has since been published in 10 other countries, and is published in the United Kingdom under the name Tommy Sullivan is a Freak. It was written as a standalone novel.

== Plot summary ==
Katie Ellison lives in the town of Eastport and is about to be a high school senior. Her boyfriend Seth Turner is a member of the high school football team. She is best friends with the most popular girl in her high school. Katie seems to have the perfect life, but her perfect image has been crafted by a few white lies. She has been making out with a drama club member, Eric Flutely, behind Seth's back. To reach her goal of buying a professional camera, Katie runs for Quahog Princess for Eastport's annual Quahog Festival, even though she dislikes quahogs.

However, it seems that Katie's lies will stay intact until Tommy Sullivan returns to Eastport. Katie and Tommy used to be best friends until Tommy became a social pariah after writing an article about football players cheating on the SAT, which caused Seth's older brother to lose a scholarship. To avoid being shunned by association, Katie participated in driving Tommy out of town by helping Seth spray paint Tommy Sullivan is a freak on the exterior of the new gymnasium (it is later revealed that Seth had wanted to spray paint a harsher word than freak, but Katie couldn't let him).

Tommy, who used to be scrawny, has gotten confident and attractive. Katie can't help but start making out with him behind her boyfriend's back, too. She is unsure of her feelings for Tommy, especially since it seems he has returned to Eastport for more than just revenge.

Katie struggles to keep her perfect image stable by telling more lies, even as she starts to realize that telling the truth might be the right thing to do.

== Characters ==
- Katie Ellison - protagonist, perpetual liar, "addicted to kissing", photographer
- Seth Turner - Katie's football player boyfriend, extremely attractive
- Sidney van der Hoff - Katie's best friend, most popular girl in her class
- Morgan Castle - running for Quahog Princess, ballet dancer
- Jake Turner - Seth's older brother, lost a scholarship after it was discovered he cheated on his SAT
- Dave Hollingsworth - Sidney's boyfriend
- Eric Fluteley - actor with whom Katie is cheating on Seth
- Tommy Sullivan
- Liam - Katie's younger brother
