= Remembrance (novel) =

2016 novel

- First edition
- Author: Meg Cabot
- Language: English
- Series: The Mediator
- Genre: Romance, Supernatural
- Publisher: William Morrow and Company
- Publication date: February 2016
- Publication place: United States
- Media type: Print
- ISBN: 978-0062379023
- Preceded by: Twilight

Remembrance is a novel written by author Meg Cabot and was published by William Morrow and Company in 2016. It is an adult sequel to her popular Mediator series.

== Plot summary ==
Eight years after the events of Twilight, Suze Simon is studying for a master's degree in counselling and interning at the Mission Academy office. She is now engaged to Jesse, who is finishing his medical residency, but he insists on waiting for marriage, much to her frustration. Paul Slater, who has fallen out with Suze following an incident at their high school graduation party, informs her that his company intends to demolish her family's old house in Carmel. He suggests that tearing down the house might unleash a curse on Jesse from the ancient Egyptian Book of the Dead, as it is his resting place, and offers to save the house if Suze sleeps with him.

When Suze carelessly tends to a self-harming student named Becca Walters, she is confronted by Lucia, an angry young ghost claiming to protect Becca, who unleashes an earthquake in the Academy office. After Lucia tries to drown Suze, Jesse orders her and Gina to move to Jake's house for their safety. Concerned that the Egyptian curse may be real, Suze agrees to a date with Paul.

The next morning, Father Dominic informs Suze that Lucia was a classmate of Becca's who died in a horseback riding accident several years ago. Father D attempts to approach the Walters family, but is seriously injured by Lucia. At the hospital, Suze and Jesse discover that her triplet step-nieces are mediators, and that Lucia has been playing with them. Lucia then strangely leads Suze to discover that Paul is the triplets' biological father.

At school the next day, Suze interrogates Becca, who admits that Lucia was murdered by Jimmy Delgado, a handyman at their previous school who had molested her; she also reports narrowly avoiding abuse by Father Francisco, the school principal. Suze and Jesse track down Jimmy, and she confronts him with Paul while on their date. Jimmy shoots himself to avoid arrest, but Suze finds his child abuse files and client list, which includes Father Francisco.

At dinner, Suze and Paul are intercepted by Jesse, who walks out when Paul reveals their deal. With her knowledge of the triplets' true parentage, Suze blackmails Paul into giving her the house. Outside, she finds Jesse, who is hurt at all the secrets Suze has kept from him, but forgives her. As they are about to make up, Paul comes out to mock them. Jesse punches him and is arrested for assault.

That night, Lucia thanks Suze and moves on to her afterlife. Suze gives Delgado's files to CeeCee and visits a greatly-improved Becca the next day; upon leaving the Walters' mansion, she finds Jesse with the keys to the house. They drive there and make love for the first time in Suze's old bedroom, after which Jesse reveals he has received a grant allowing him to start his own medical practice. With Father D's help, Suze and Jesse get married the next weekend and host a wedding reception at the house, surrounded by their friends and family.

== Characters ==
- Susannah 'Suze' Simon: the titular mediator, Suze completed a psychology degree after graduation and is now studying for a certification in school counselling while working as an unpaid intern at the Mission Academy school office.
- Hector 'Jesse' de Silva: a former ghost and Suze's fiancé, now a doctor-in-training hoping to start his own practice in Carmel after completing his medical residency.
- Paul Slater: a fellow mediator and former classmate of Suze's who is strongly attracted to her. He becomes the CEO of Slater Industries after his grandfather's death, and is now "one of the wealthiest bachelors in LA". Paul is later revealed to be the father of Brad and Debbie's triplets.
- Jack Slater: Paul's younger brother and Suze's high school babysitting charge, another mediator who is now a video game designer in Seattle.
- Father Dominic: the principal of the Mission Academy, a Catholic priest and fellow mediator who is Suze's mentor.
- CeeCee Webb: Suze's best friend from the Mission Academy, now a low-level reporter at the Carmel Pine Cone.
- Adam MacTavish: Suze's other best friend from the Academy and CeeCee's on-and-off boyfriend, now studying law at Michigan State.
- Gina Torres: Suze's best friend from New York, who now lives with her and works as a barista at the Coffee Clutch while trying to break into Hollywood.
- Kelly Walters (née Prescott): Suze's high school enemy, who dated Paul before marrying Lance Walters, a rich businessman twice her age.
- Helen and Andy Ackerman: Suze's mother and stepfather, who move to Los Angeles after Andy's home improvement show becomes an international hit.
- Jake 'Sleepy' Ackerman: Suze's eldest stepbrother, a medical marijuana entrepreneur who lives with Jesse.
- Brad 'Dopey' Ackerman: Suze's middle stepbrother, who married Debbie Mancuso after getting her pregnant on graduation night and is now a father to triplets, working at his father-in-law's car dealership. The triplets are named Emily, Emma and Elizabeth.
- David 'Doc' Ackerman: Suze's youngest stepbrother, now a junior at Harvard University.

== Reception ==
Kirkus Reviews called Remembrance "a fun and satisfying grown-up update on Suze’s life", highlighting how Suze handles family drama, professional woes, and supernatural conundrums "with heavy doses of attitude, ass-kicking, and profanity".
