= The Princess Diaries, Volume X: Forever Princess =

2009 YA novel by Meg Cabot

- First edition
- Author: Meg Cabot
- Language: English
- Series: The Princess Diaries
- Genre: Young adult novel
- Publisher: HarperCollins
- Publication date: 6 January 2009
- Publication place: United States
- Pages: 383(UK) 400(USA)
- Preceded by: The Princess Diaries, Volume IX: Princess Mia
- Followed by: The Princess Diaries, Volume XI: Royal Wedding

The Princess Diaries, Volume X: Forever Princess is a young adult book in the Princess Diaries series. Written by Meg Cabot, it was released on January 6, 2009 by Harper Collins Publishers.

The book was released in the UK on January 2, 2009, and called The Princess Diaries: Ten out of Ten. Upon its release it was intended to be the final entry in the Princess Diaries series, but was eventually followed by 2015's Royal Wedding.

== Plot ==
Two years after the events of the ninth book, Mia finds herself preparing for her 18th birthday party, her prom, and her high school graduation within the space of a week. She is in a stable relationship with J.P., has become good friends with Lana, and maintains a friendly email correspondence with Michael, but remains painfully estranged from Lilly, who is now dating Kenny. However, Mia is still attached to her bad habit of lying: though she tells everyone otherwise, she has been accepted into every college she applied for, due to her royal status. She also unsuccessfully tries to publish her senior project, a steamy romance novel written under an alias, while telling her friends and family that the project is a paper on Genovian olive oil pressing. Adding to her anxieties, her father, Philippe, is running in the Genovian election for Prime Minister against her cousin, René, who is leading in the polls.

Having found immense success in Japan with the CardioArm, her ex, Michael, returns to Manhattan. He and Mia resume their friendship in person when she is forced to interview him for the school paper. Mia accidentally smells Michael's neck and her feelings for Michael come right back, making her feel wrong about JP. Mia soon finds herself questioning her relationship with J.P. and admits to herself she does not really feel attracted to him. To make matters worse, after finding out she wrote a romance novel (and congratulating her for it), Michael reads it and gives her a Princess Leia USB flashdrive, which he designed himself, for her birthday.

At Mia's birthday party, J.P. gives her a promise ring in front of all the guests, causing Michael to walk out. Mia accepts the ring, but begins to suspect J.P.'s motives: his senior project, a play about their relationship, reveals some of Mia's private moments without her consent; he never reads the novel she's written, and the paparazzi always seem to know when they are together. On top of that, Michael donates a CardioArm to Genovia, and Lilly films a commercial in support of Prince Philippe, helping his election prospects. Nonetheless, Mia continues her relationship with J.P., stubbornly thinking she owes him that much.

After a non-date with Michael on the Boat House on Senior Skip day, Mia and her ex-boyfriend go on a carriage ride through Central Park. They end up making out, for several blocks, but Mia runs off before he can confess his love. Later he texts her while she is at therapy saying he still loves her and would wait for her. At Prom night, Mia continues to feel that something is off about JP, especially when she realizes that he had booked a hotel room for them, ages before they made plans to attend the party at all. At Mia's insistence, Lilly tells her that J.P. only dated her in sophomore year to get closer to Mia, and that they had in fact slept together, contrary to his claims that he is a virgin. This leads Mia to realize that JP was lying to her all along, and the two girls make up. Mia then confronts JP about his lies, breaks up with him, and puts a cease-and-desist on his play. Unbeknownst to her, Michael was just within earshot and, having overheard what happened, is livid at JP. Mia dissuades him from beating JP up, offering to go with him to his apartment instead, where it is implied that they have sex and she gets her snowflake necklace back.

The next day, Mia learns that her father won the election by a landslide. Michael and Mia, boyfriend and girlfriend again, go back to Mia's loft, so she can get ready for her graduation. After a long speech by Kenny Showalter, they all leave for the party at Tavern on the Green. There, Mia reunites with Michael's family, has an awkward meeting with JP's dad, and finally announces to her parents and to Grandmère that she has picked Sarah Lawrence College (which was the college Grandmère had wanted Mia to go to and her father had suggested early in the series).
