= The Boy Next Door (novel) =

2002 novel by Meg Cabot

First edition

The Boy Next Door (published as The Guy Next Door in the UK) is a novel written by Meg Cabot. The book was published in 2002. Written with an e-mail format throughout the book, it tells the story of a gossip columnist who becomes entangled in a relationship with the nephew of her neighbour, who is in a coma following an attempted murder.

== Plot ==
The main character in this novel is Melissa Fuller, but "You can call me Mel", as she says. Mel is a gossip columnist for the New York Journal and has just broken up with her longtime boyfriend, Aaron Spender. Her best friend, Nadine Wilcock, a food critic, is marrying her fiancé, Tony Salerno, who is a chef at the popular restaurant Fresche. Melissa also has many coworkers, including Dolly Vargas, an outlandish Style Editor who has her eyes on quite a few men.

The book starts with Melissa being late to work after finding her neighbour, Mrs. Helen Friedlander, facedown on the carpet of her apartment after a brutal attack. Mel gets her to the hospital but has yet to solve the problem of walking Paco, Mrs. Friedlander's Great Dane. She calls upon Mrs. Friedlander's nephew, Max Friedlander, to come and take care of Paco and the two cats Tweedledum and Mr. Peepers. Max, who is on vacation with the supermodel Vivica, calls upon his millionaire friend John Trent, who is a crime reporter for the New York Chronicle, the Journal's top competitor. John impersonates Max and moves into Max's Aunt Helen's apartment.

John and Melissa get off to a good start after sharing mutual affections for not only each other, but other things as well. They go on a date but are stopped by Tweedledum's hospitalization. Afterwards, John kisses Mel over Chinese food, and gets mixed reactions from her as she jumps off to her apartment.

John is troubled over whether he should sleep with Mel. He asks for advice from his family, including his grandmother, Genevieve Randolph Trent, his rich brother Jason Trent, and his sister-in-law, Stacy Trent. They each feel that he should go for it. He does, in fact, take Mel out for dinner and afterward, they have sex. They express their love for each other.

When John is accidentally exposed for who he really is, Mel considers moving back to Lansing, Illinois. However an email from John's sister-in-law proves how much he truly loves her and he is at last forgiven. However, no one knows who attacked Mrs. Freidlander. Nevertheless, with a little wit, John and Mel solve the case, leading it back to her nephew, Max. The novel ends with a cliffhanger of John saying he needs to ask Mel a question. She says that whatever it is, the answer is yes.

== Characters ==
=== Main ===
- Melissa Fuller a gossip columnist who lives in Manhattan
- John Trent a millionaire Park Avenue Trent who lives in Brooklyn off his salary as a crime reporter

=== New York Journal and Friends ===
- Nadine Wilcock the food critic and Melissa's best friend
- Tony Salerno Nadine's fiancée and chef at Fresche
- George Sanchez managing editor
- Peter Hargrave editor in chief
- Dolly Vargas style editor
- Aaron Spender chief correspondent and Mel's former boyfriend
- Amy Jenkins human resources administrator
- Timothy Grabowski gay IT guy

-Several other reporters

=== New York Chronicle and friends ===
- Michael Everett editor in chief
- Sergent Paul Reese NYPD man and correspondent to John

=== John's Family ===
- Genevieve Randolph Trent grandmother
- Jason Trent brother
- Stacy Trent sister-in-law
- Brittany and Haley Trent nieces
- John Trent Jr. nephew

=== Max's Entourage ===
- Max Friedlander photographer and Helen's nephew
- Vivica supermodel and Max's ex-girlfriend
- Helen Friedlander Max's aunt and victim
- Lenore Flemming Vivica's assistant
- Sebastian Leandro Max's agent

=== Mel's Family ===
- Don and Beverly Fuller parents

=== Animals ===
- Paco the great dane
- Mr. Peepers Siamese cat
- Tweedledum diabetic Siamese cat
