= Teen Idol (novel) =

Novel by Meg Cabot

- First edition
- Author: Meg Cabot
- Language: English
- Genre: Young adult novel
- Publisher: HarperCollins
- Publication date: 2004
- Publication place: United States
- Media type: Print (Hardback & Paperback)
- Pages: 304 pp (first edition, hardback)
- ISBN: 0-06-009616-0 (first edition, hardback)
- OCLC: 54205862
- LC Class: PZ7.C11165 Tee 2004

Teen Idol was written by Meg Cabot and published in August 2004 in hardcover and in August 2005 in paperback edition.

== Plot ==
Jenny Greenley is a 16-year-old high school junior who lives in the small town of Clayton, Indiana. She is secretly the school newspaper's advice columnist Ask Annie. When teen film star and heartthrob Luke Striker decides to go undercover at Clayton High School to do research on an upcoming role, the principal assigns Luke as Jen's responsibility. She is expected to show him around the school, help him integrate, and most importantly, keep his true identity secret from her fellow students.

During his time at Clayton, Luke is appalled by the vicious hierarchy of high school and tells Jen that she should start taking a stand for the people who can't speak up for themselves. After Luke's true identity is revealed, Jen realizes that she has the power to do so, and starts making serious changes in the lives of others and herself as well, morphing from "nice little Jenny Greenley, everybody's best friend" to Jen, effector of social change. She quits show choir, foils a cruel senior prank, and befriends unpopular outcast Cara. Despite the newfound media exposure surrounding Clayton, Jen's feelings for Luke remain platonic. Meanwhile, she grows closer to Scott, a fellow junior and editor of the school newspaper.

At the Spring Fling, after Luke and Jen are crowned king and queen, Luke reveals that he is going out with Geri Lynn — a senior and friend of Jen's — and much to her surprise, also tells Jen that he knows she is Annie. He encourages Jen to follow her own advice and confess her true feelings for Scott. Later that night Scott and Jen admit their feelings for one another and kiss.

The novel ends with Luke and Geri together in LA, and Scott and Jen in a relationship. With Trina and Cara's assistance, Jen runs for student body president next year, but half-jokingly notes that she "might be aiming a little too low. I'm thinking, a girl with my people skills? Well... why not the White House?"

== Reception ==
Teen Idol was released in August 2004 and made the New York Times Bestseller list under the Children's Chapter Books category. Publishers Weekly described the novel as a "snappy and fun read," and Kirkus Reviews called it an "instantly engaging, humorous first-person tale."
