= Gregg Sulkin =

British actor (born 1992)

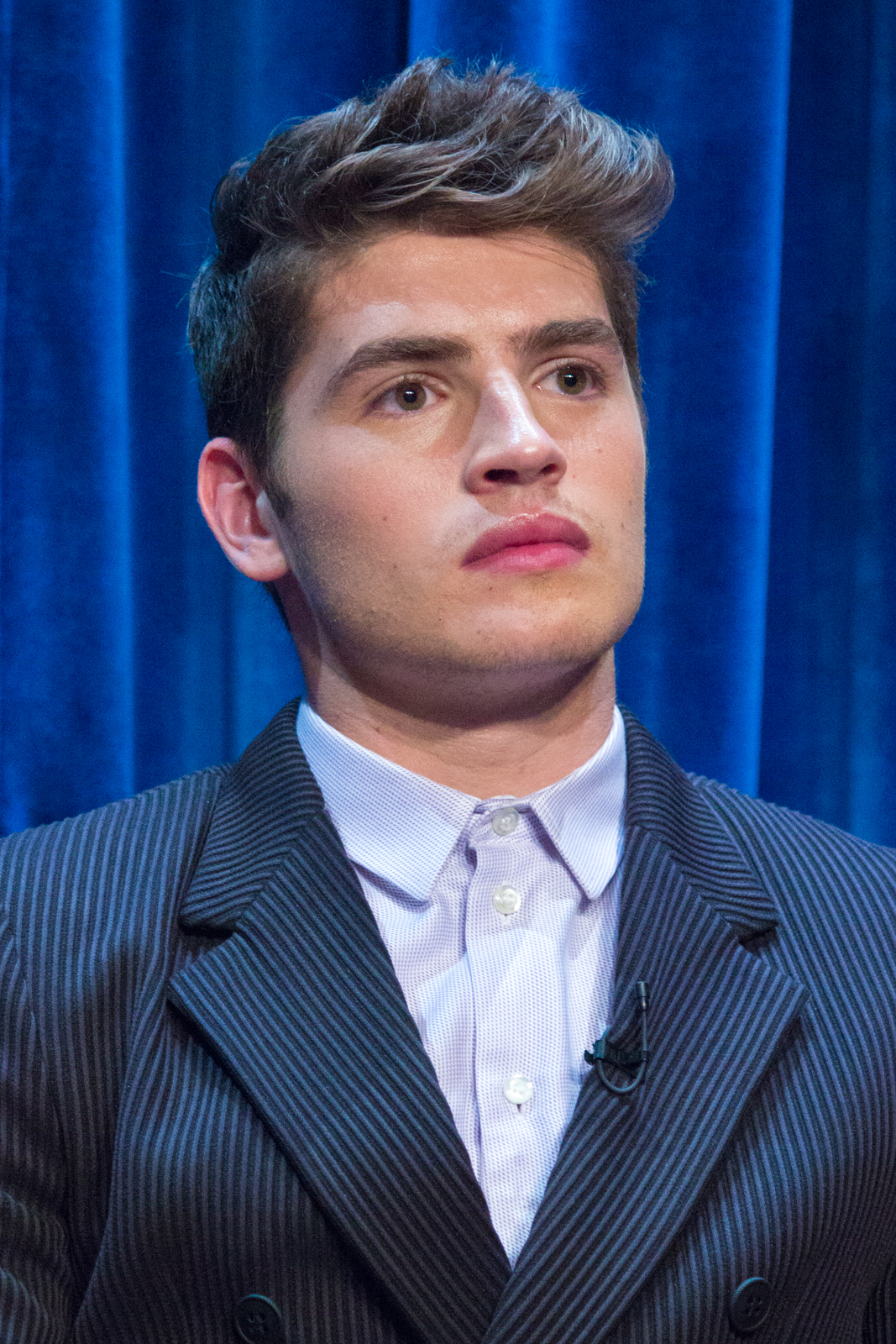
- Sulkin at the 2014 PaleyFest Fall TV Premiere presentation for MTV's Faking It
- Born: 29 May 1992 (age 34); London, England
- Citizenship: United Kingdom; United States
- Education: Highgate School
- Occupation: Actor
- Years active: 2002–present

Gregg Sulkin (born 29 May 1992) is an English actor. He made his television debut in the 2002 miniseries Doctor Zhivago, and his film debut in the 2006 comedy Sixty Six, before gaining early recognition for his leading role in the Disney Channel UK comedy series As the Bell Rings (2007–2008). Sulkin's breakthrough came with his Hollywood debut in the television series Wizards of Waverly Place (2010–2012) and its 2013 television film sequel. He also starred in the Disney television film Avalon High (2010).

Following his recurring role in the third season of the thriller series Pretty Little Liars (2012), Sulkin starred in the teen comedy television series Faking It (2014–2016); the superhero television series Runaways (2017–2019), in which he portrayed Chase Stein; and Pretty Smart (2021). During this period, he also starred in the independent films White Frog (2012) and Don't Hang Up (2016), as well as in the teen romance films A Cinderella Story: Christmas Wish (2019) and This Is the Year (2020). Sulkin has since starred in the second season of the BBC war drama series World on Fire (2023) and in Tyler Perry's war film The Six Triple Eight (2024).

== Early life ==
Sulkin was born in Westminster, London. He is Jewish and had his Bar Mitzvah at the Western Wall in Jerusalem. He attended Highgate School in North London.

== Career ==
=== Early work (2002–2009) ===
Sulkin made his acting debut in the 2002 mini-series Doctor Zhivago. He subsequently starred in the comedy Sixty Six, as Bernie Rubens, alongside Helena Bonham Carter, Eddie Marsan and Catherine Tate. Sulkin also played the role of JJ in the Disney Channel comedy, As the Bell Rings, worked on a CBBC children sci-fi show The Sarah Jane Adventures (spin-off of Doctor Who), playing Adam in series 3 two-episode story The Mad Woman in the Attic.

Sulkin was part of Disney Channel's Pass the Plate as Gregg from the UK. He had a recurring guest role on the Disney Channel series Wizards of Waverly Place, where he played Alex's love interest Mason Greyback he reprised his role in 4 episodes of season 3 and returned to the series in its fourth season, and through to its finale. Sulkin has also landed a role in the thriller The Heavy.

=== Breakthrough (2010–2014) ===
In 2010, he went to New Zealand to film the Disney Channel Original Movie Avalon High, which premiered on 12 November 2010. In an interview with Kyle Martino, aired on Soccer Talk Live on the Fox Soccer Channel in the US, Sulkin announced that he was a fan of Arsenal. Sulkin participated the Disney Channel's Friends for Change Games and was on the Yellow Team. He reprised his role as Mason Greyback in The Wizards Return: Alex vs. Alex which premiered on Disney Channel in March 2013.

In 2012, Sulkin starred in the American teen drama series Pretty Little Liars as a recurring character, Wesley Fitzgerald, brother of Ezra Fitz. In February 2013, it was announced that Sulkin would play Julian Fineman in FOX's television adaptation of Lauren Oliver's young adult novel, Delirium. On 8 May, it was reported that Fox has decided not to pick up Delirium.

=== Since 2014 ===
From 2014 to 2016, Sulkin starred in the MTV comedy Faking It. Sulkin portrayed Liam Booker. Sulkin defeated Victoria Justice on 30 July 2015 episode of Spike's Lip Sync Battle, where he performed "I Believe in a Thing Called Love" by The Darkness before donning a wig and going shirtless to perform Kelis's "Milkshake".

Sulkin starred in the leading role of Sam Fuller in the horror-thriller film Don't Hang Up which was released in theatres on 10 February 2017.

Sulkin also played Chase Stein on Runaways, a Hulu series set in the Marvel Cinematic Universe.

== Personal life ==
Sulkin became an American citizen on 23 May 2018. He retains his British citizenship.

== Filmography ==
=== Film ===
Year	Title	Role	Notes
2006	Sixty Six	Bernie Rubens	
2009	The Heavy	Teen Two	
2010	Avalon High	Will Wagner	
2011	Camilla Dickinson	Frank Rowan	
2012	White Frog	Randy Goldman	
2013	Another Me	Drew	
2014	Affluenza	Dylan Carson	
2015	Anti-Social	Dee	
2015	A Mouse Tale	The Dark Rodent	Voice role; direct-to-DVD
2015	Yak: The Giant King	Flapper	Voice role
2016	Don't Hang Up	Sam Fuller	
2017	Drink, Slay, Love	Jadrien	
2018	Status Update	Derek Lowe	
2019	A Cinderella Story: Christmas Wish	Dominic Wintergarden	Direct-to-video
2020	Deported	Lorne	
2020	This Is the Year	Kale	
2022	The List	Cooper Grant	
2022	Keeper of the Cup	Charlie	
2022	The Throwback	Rick	
2024	The Six Triple Eight	Abram David	
2026	Crawlers	TBA	

=== Television ===
Key
†	Denotes television productions that have not yet been released

Year	Title	Role	Notes
2002	Doctor Zhivago	Seryozha	Miniseries
2006	Man on the Moon	Michael Aldrin	Television special
2006	Pass the Plate	Himself	
2007–2008	As the Bell Rings	JJ	Main role
2009	The Sarah Jane Adventures	Adam	2 episodes
2010	Avalon High	William Wagner	Television film
2010–2012	Wizards of Waverly Place	Mason Greyback	Recurring role (seasons 3–4)
2011	Get the Look	Himself	
2011	The Haunting Hour: The Series	Matt	Episode: "The Perfect Brother"
2012	Melissa & Joey	Haskell Davis	3 episodes
2012	Pretty Little Liars	Wesley Fitzgerald	Recurring role
2013	Delirium	Julian Fineman	Unsold television pilot
2013	The Wizards Return: Alex vs. Alex	Mason Greyback	Television special
2014	A Daughter's Nightmare	Ben Woods	Television film
2014–2016	Faking It	Liam Booker	Main role
2015	Lip Sync Battle	Himself	Episode: "Gregg Sulkin vs. Victoria Justice"
2016	Life in Pieces	Jake	Episode: "Prank Assistant Gum Puppy"
2016	Young & Hungry	Rick	Episode: "Young & Assistant"
2017–2019	Runaways	Chase Stein	Main role
2018	American Ninja Warrior	Himself	Season 10’s Red Nose Day Special
2021	Pretty Smart	Grant	Main role
2023	Lopez vs Lopez	Dr. Bell	Episode: "Lopez vs. Cheating"
2023	World on Fire	David	Main role (series 2)
2026	Wizards Beyond Waverly Place	Mason Greyback	Special guest star (season 3); episode: "The Right Stuffie"
2027	The Forsytes †		Series 3; post-production

=== Music videos ===
Year	Title	Artist(s)	Notes
2013	"Karma's Not Pretty"	Temara Melek	
2018	"I'm a Mess"	Bebe Rexha	
2020	"Crying in the Mirror"	Rainford	

== Awards and nominations ==
Year	Awards	Category	Recipient	Result	Refs
2015	Teen Choice Awards	Choice Summer TV Star: Male	Faking It	Nominated	
2016	Teen Choice Awards	Choice Summer TV Star: Male	Faking It	Nominated	
