= Dylan and Cole Sprouse =

American twin actors (born 1992)

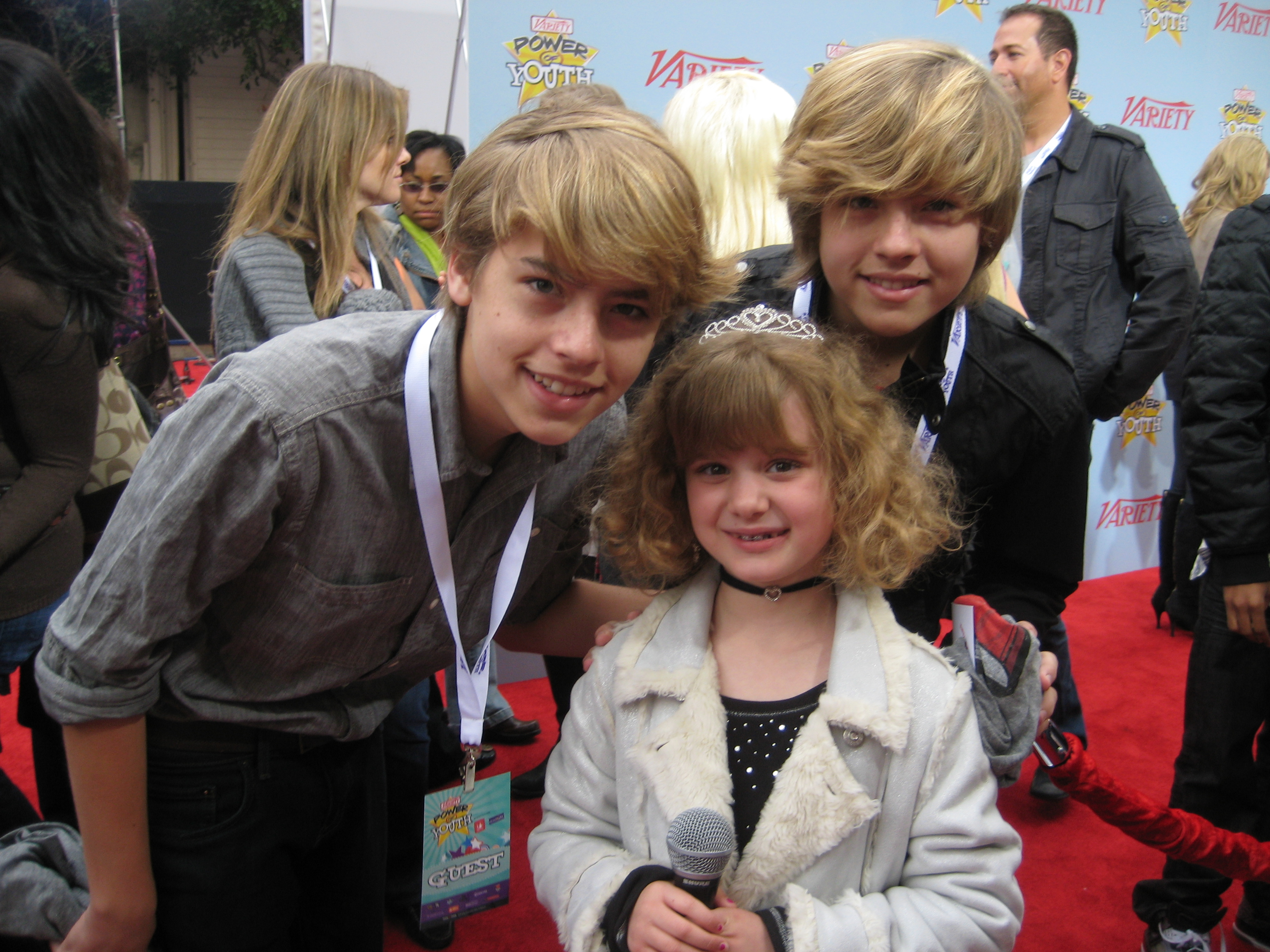
- Cole (left) and Dylan (right) Sprouse, with Piper Reese at the 2009 Power of Youth event
- Born: Cole Mitchell Sprouse; Dylan Thomas Sprouse; August 4, 1992 (age 34); Arezzo, Tuscany, Italy
- Education: New York University
- Occupation: Actors
- Years active: 1993–2012; 2017–present

Dylan Thomas Sprouse and Cole Mitchell Sprouse (born August 4, 1992) are American actors. They are twins and are sometimes referred to as the Sprouse brothers or Sprouse Bros. Their first major theatrical film role was in the 1999 comedy Big Daddy, in which they co-starred with Adam Sandler. They later appeared in several television sitcoms and starred in the television film I Saw Mommy Kissing Santa Claus and straight-to-DVD Just for Kicks.

From 2005 until 2008, they starred in the Disney Channel sitcom The Suite Life of Zack & Cody. As a result of the series' success, the media has termed them "heartthrobs" and "overwhelming draws" among preteen and teen audiences. The following year, the brothers launched a franchise known as the Sprouse Bros brand, which included a clothing line, book series and magazine. The majority of the Sprouses' franchise ended in 2008, except for their clothing line. The Suite Life of Zack & Cody was retooled in 2008 as The Suite Life on Deck, in which the brothers reprised their roles as Zack and Cody. The Suite Life on Deck went on to become the most-watched children's television show in 2008 and 2009. The show ended in May 2011. They also starred in The Suite Life Movie, which aired in March of the same year. They began cultivating an adult image by starring in the independent theatrical suspense film The Kings of Appletown in 2009.

Dylan and Cole were two of the wealthiest children alive in 2007, and in 2010, the Sprouse brothers were the highest-paid Disney television child actors, earning $40,000 per episode combined. MSN reported by the end of the 2000s that the twin brothers became the richest young twins in the world. In 2010, the brothers were accepted to New York University. They deferred admission for one year, and attended the university from 2011 to 2015. Both Cole and Dylan confirmed they wish to pursue acting post-university.

As of 2018, Cole appeared as Jughead Jones on the television series Riverdale, and Dylan is a co-owner and brewmaster of the All-Wise Meadery in Williamsburg, Brooklyn.

== Early lives ==
The Sprouses were born at Clinica Tanganelli, a small hospital in Arezzo, Italy, to American parents Matthew Sprouse and Melanie Wright, while they were teaching at an English language school in Tuscany. Dylan was named after Welsh poet Dylan Thomas, and Cole is named after jazz singer and pianist Nat King Cole. Dylan is 15 minutes older than Cole. They have German ancestry. The boys moved back to the United States four months after their birth to their parents' native Long Beach, California. Some of the money Dylan and Cole earned by acting was used to buy a house in Calabasas, California, where their family still lived as of summer 2012.

== Acting ==
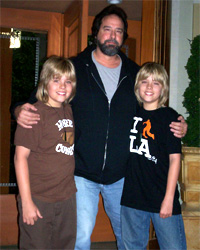
Dylan (left) and Cole (right), with their acting coach, Gary Spatz, c. 2007

The brothers began acting at the age of eight months following a suggestion from their grandmother, Jonine Booth Wright, who was a drama teacher and actress. They first appeared in a commercial for diapers, switching on-screen time every few seconds. As with many twins, the two have often played the same role, due to child labor laws in California restricting the amount of time children can be filmed in a day. Casting twins in a single role thus allows more time for the character to be filmed. Beginning at eight months old, the two played a single character, Patrick Kelly, on the ABC series Grace Under Fire.

In 1999, the boys appeared in their first major feature film, Big Daddy, in which they shared the role of a five-year-old boy named Julian who is adopted by Adam Sandler's character, Sonny Koufax. Though the film received mixed reviews, the two were nominated for multiple awards for their role in the film. However, they did not win any. The same year, the boys also had a minor role in the thriller The Astronaut's Wife. The Sprouses have noted that after Big Daddy's release, they entered a slow period in their careers and were not cast in any major roles for a time. During the early 2000s, the twins appeared in episodes of The Nightmare Room and That '70s Show, as well as in Mad TV and portrayed roles in the feature films The Master of Disguise and Adam Sandler's Eight Crazy Nights. Cole began appearing in episodes of the television show Friends as Ross Geller's son Ben in 2001; this role was not shared with Dylan.

They both appeared in I Saw Mommy Kissing Santa Claus and Just for Kicks, both of which were family films that received a direct-to-video release. David Nusair of Reel Film Reviews said of their acting in Just for Kicks that the brothers "aren't the worst child actors I've ever seen,... but they certainly leave a lot to be desired." Dylan and Cole were later cast in the Disney Channel original series The Suite Life of Zack & Cody, where they portrayed identical twins Zack and Cody Martin, respectively. The series, which debuted in March 2005, became a ratings success. As part of their involvement with Disney, the brothers also became part of the 11-member group, the Disney Channel Circle of Stars, and sang the song "A Dream is a Wish Your Heart Makes" along with the members of the group, for a video that was released as bonus material in the special edition version of the Disney film Cinderella. They also participated in the Disney Channel Games.

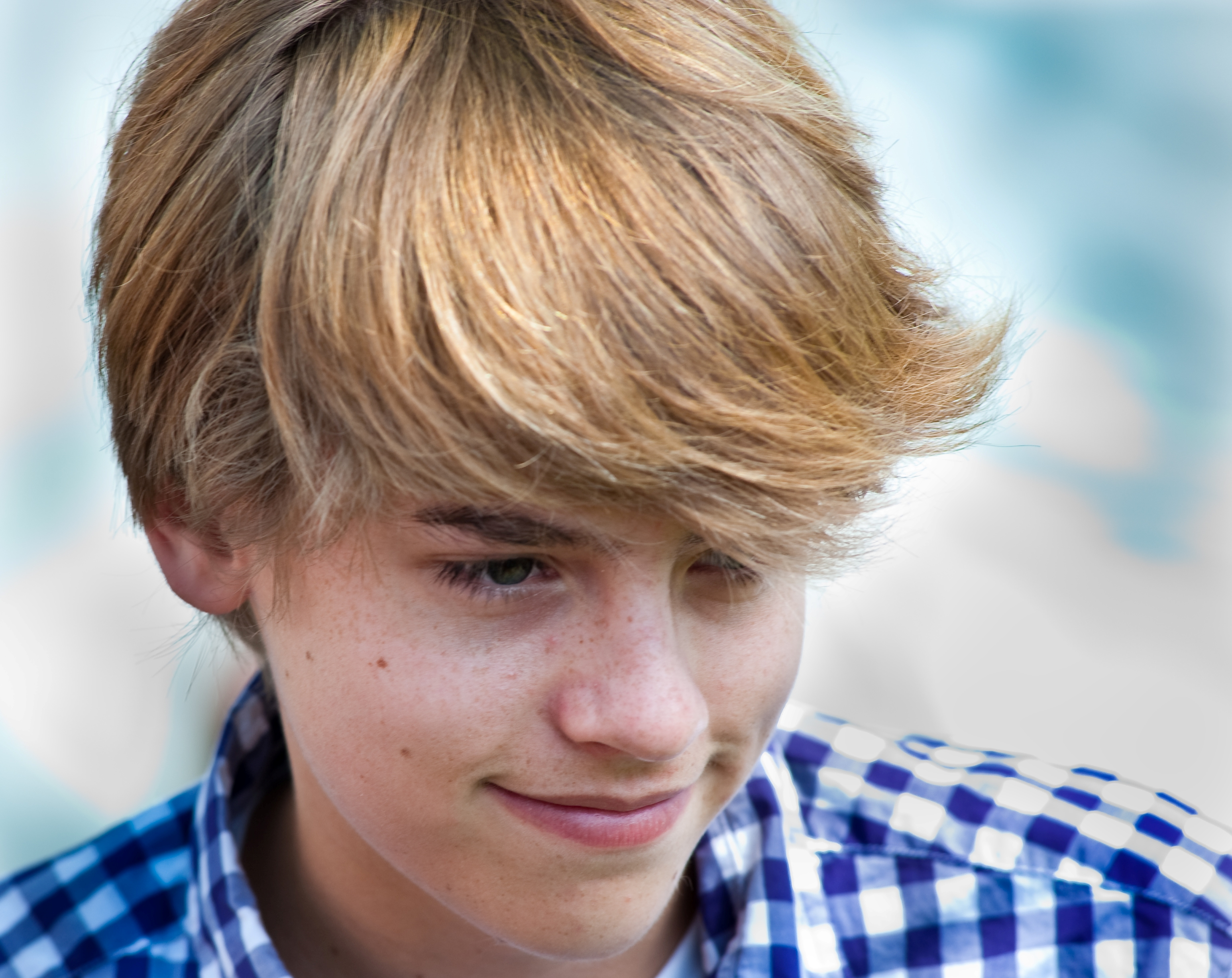
Cole Sprouse at the 2010 White House Easter Egg roll

The Sprouses played one character, Jeremiah, in the independent film The Heart Is Deceitful Above All Things. The film was produced in 2004 but not given a theatrical release until March 2006, when it played at three theatres in the United States, ultimately grossing $29,000 domestically. Harvey Karten praised their acting, stating that "acting is superlative all around", and Tamara Straus of the San Francisco Chronicle called them "the movie's only saving grace". In 2007, the two filmed A Modern Twain Story: The Prince and the Pauper. Carrie R. Wheadon of Common Sense Media said the film was a "slow story for Zack and Cody fans only". The Sprouse brothers both had voice roles in the animated film Holidaze: The Christmas That Almost Didn't Happen alongside Brenda Song and Emily Osment. Dylan played the voice of Shasta in Disney's "Snow Buddies". The brothers both starred in the theatrical film The Kings of Appletown, which is based on the book The Adventures of Tom Sawyer. The film was directed by Bobby Moresco and written by Amanda Moresco. Shot in New Braunfels, Texas, the film was originally estimated to be released in the winter of 2008. Kings of Appletown had a limited theatrical release on December 12, 2009, and was officially released at the Newport Beach Film Festival in April 2010.

They appeared on the cover of the May 2009 issue People Magazine, in an eighty-page special edition issue devoted to The Suite Life on Deck. The twin brothers began filming another Modern Twain Story film in the summer of 2009. The film was tentatively titled "Sivilized" and was a modern version of Huckleberry Finn. However, in mid-2010, Dylan stated that they would not be doing the film, in part because they "outgrew" the film. They became the new face of the children's yogurt, Danimals, in 2009; their endorsement deal was renewed in 2010. The twin brothers signed an endorsement deal with Nintendo DS in August 2010.

As of early to mid-2011, Dylan and Cole were not in any acting projects and were focusing instead on college as well as art and photography, respectively. However, Dylan has stated that they would both like to continue acting while in college. Dylan and Cole are represented by William Morris Endeavor as of 2011.

In February 2016, Cole was cast as Jughead Jones in The CW's drama series Riverdale, based on Archie. The series concluded its seven-season run on August 23, 2023.

== Sprouse Bros brand ==
In 2005, the Sprouse brothers signed a licensing agreement with Dualstar Entertainment to produce Sprouse Bros branded merchandise for the preadolescent market, the Sprouse Bros brand included a clothing line, comics series and a magazine, as well as personal hygiene line and a line of sportswear. Dylan said of the brand that they wanted to "reach out to the nerd group and the cool group" and "appeal to everybody". A magazine targeting boys was launched by Dualstar and Leisure Publishing LLC in 2006 called Sprouse Bros. Code. Simon & Schuster Inc. published two volumes of a book series titled Sprouse Bros. 47 R.O.N.I.N., which was described as featuring the Sprouse twins as "young James Bonds or undercover agents"; the book series continued. In 2008, the brothers ended their association with the Olsens' Dualstar, but they continued to sell their clothing line. The items in their clothing lines were sold exclusively online until mid-March 2012, when the online store could no longer be accessed.

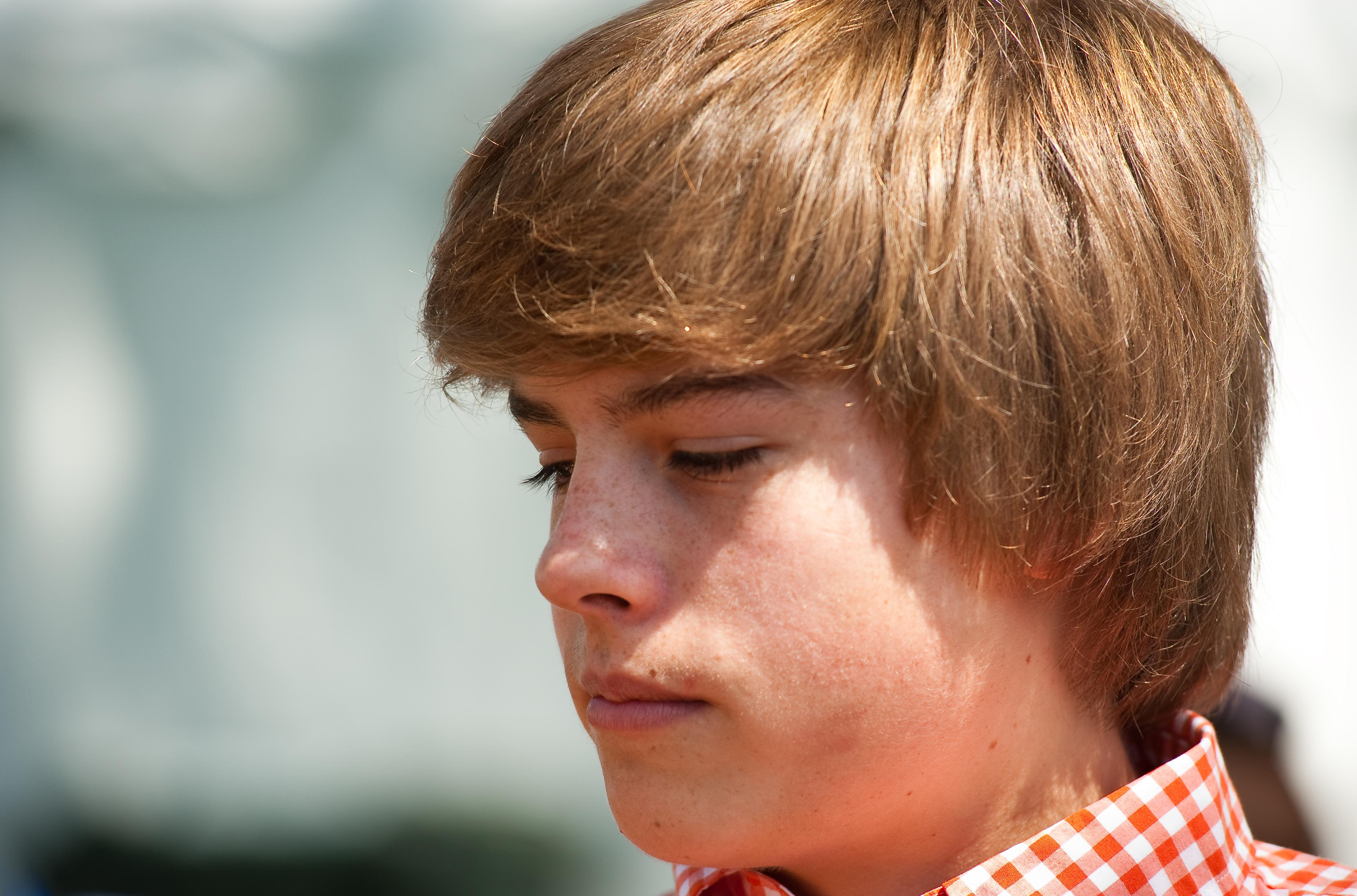
Dylan Sprouse at the 2010 White House Easter Egg roll

== Personal lives ==
Dylan Sprouse has stated that the experience of coming to fame after the success of The Suite Life of Zack & Cody is "kind of scary, how fast everything is moving" and that a year prior "none of this was happening, it was just doing Suite Life", and that he was excited for the future. While filming The Suite Life of Zack & Cody, the both of them received on-set tutoring for three hours each day for school, and said they were getting "straight A's and honors". In their last year of high school, the brothers both took Advanced Placement classes. Dylan took AP Psychology and AP Spanish, and Cole took AP Psychology and AP Government.

The twins' family has three dogs: Bubba, which belongs to Dylan and Cole; Pinky, who is their father's; and Curry, their stepmother's. Their favorite actor and co-star is Adam Sandler. Dylan has said that Adam is "a role model in acting" and that they learned a lot about comedy from him. In mid-2010, Dylan launched a site for his art called Sprouse Arts, and in mid-2011, Cole launched a site for his photography called Cole Sprouse Photography.

In 2010, the brothers were both accepted to New York University. They had initial plans to attend the university in the fall of 2010; however, they deferred for one year. Dylan initially planned on majoring in fine/studio arts and minoring in economics while Cole planned on majoring in film and television production and minoring in drama. Instead, they both enrolled in the Gallatin School of Individualized Study, which allows students to plan their own curriculum. Cole focused his curriculum on the humanities and archaeology while Dylan focused on video game design. In 2011, Dylan was elected president of the Third Avenue North residence hall at New York University. Both brothers graduated in May 2015; they told Entertainment magazine that they had walked away with each other's diplomas at the graduation ceremony.

In 2012, Dylan and Cole were officially appointed as the International Ambassadors of the Koyamada International Foundation. They traveled to Japan with Shin Koyamada to empower the youth of Japan to better themselves and rebuild Japan as a society as well as to deepen the friendly relations and brotherhood between the youth of Japan and America in August 2013.

As of 2013, Dylan was working as a host at a New York City restaurant, which he explained was a result of his desire to try a new experience, as he said, "working somewhat below the means I'm used to, as well as a way to socialize and get out of the house."

Since 2014, Dylan has commentated a few Super Smash Bros. tournaments.

In early 2017, Dylan announced that with two partners he was preparing to open All-Wise Meadery in the Williamsburg section of Brooklyn, New York; he is the brewmaster. He disclosed that he has been a Heathen since he was 15.

== Filmography ==
=== Film ===
Year	Title	Dylan's role	Cole's role	Notes
1999	Big Daddy	Julian McGrath		
1999	The Astronaut's Wife	Twin	Twin	
2001	Diary of a Sex Addict	Sammy Jr.		Direct-to-video film
2001	I Saw Mommy Kissing Santa Claus	Justin Carver		
2002	The Master of Disguise	Young Pistachio Disguisey		
2002	Eight Crazy Nights	KB Toys soldiers		Voice
2003	Apple Jack	Jack Pyne		Short film
2003	Just for Kicks	Dylan Martin	Cole Martin	Direct-to-video film
2004	The Heart Is Deceitful Above All Things	Older Jeremiah		
2005	Piggy Banks	Young John	—N/a	Alternate title: Born Killers
2006	Holidaze: The Christmas That Almost Didn't Happen	Kid		Voice; direct-to-video film
2007	A Modern Twain Story: The Prince and the Pauper	Tom Canty	Eddie Tudor	
2008	Snow Buddies	Shasta	—N/a	Voice; direct-to-video film
2009	The Kings of Appletown	Will	Clayton	
2010	Kung Fu Magoo	Justin Magoo	Brad Landry	Direct-to-video film

=== Television ===
Year	Title	Dylan's role	Cole's role	Notes
1993–1998	Grace Under Fire	Patrick Kelly		Main role; 72 episodes
1998	Mad TV	Kid	Kid	2 episodes
2000–2002	Friends	—N/a	Ben Geller	7 episodes
2001	The Nightmare Room	Buddy		Episode: "Scareful What You Wish For"
2001	That '70s Show	Bobby	Billy	Episode: "Eric's Depression"
2005–2008	The Suite Life of Zack & Cody	Zack Martin	Cody Martin	Lead role; all 87 episodes
2006	The Emperor's New School	Zam	Zim	Voice; episode: "Oops, All Doodles/Chipmunky Business"
2006	That's So Raven	Zack Martin	Cody Martin	Episode: "Checkin' Out"
2008	According to Jim	Himself	Himself	Episode: "I Drink Your Milkshake"
2008–2011	The Suite Life on Deck	Zack Martin	Cody Martin	Lead role; all 71 episodes
2009	Wizards of Waverly Place	Zack Martin	Cody Martin	Episode: "Cast-Away (To Another Show)"
2009	Hannah Montana	Zack Martin	Cody Martin	Episode: "Super(stitious) Girl"
2010	I'm in the Band	Zack Martin	Cody Martin	Episode: "Weasels on Deck"
2011	The Suite Life Movie	Zack Martin	Cody Martin	Television film
2012	So Random!	Himself	Himself	Episode: "Cole and Dylan Sprouse"

== Awards and nominations ==
Year	Award	Work	Category	Cole	Dylan
1999	YoungStar Awards	Big Daddy	Best Performance by a Young Actor in a Comedy Film	Nominated	Nominated
2000	MTV Movie Awards	Big Daddy	Best On-Screen Duo	Nominated	Nominated
2000	Blockbuster Entertainment Awards	Big Daddy	Favorite Supporting Actor – Comedy	Nominated	Nominated
2000	Young Artist Awards	Big Daddy	Best Performance in a Feature Film – Young Actor Age Ten or Under	Nominated	Nominated
2006	Young Artist Awards	The Suite Life of Zack & Cody	Best Performance in a TV Series (Comedy or Drama) – Leading Young Actor	Nominated	Nominated
2007	Kids' Choice Awards	The Suite Life of Zack & Cody	Favorite Television Actor	Nominated	—N/a
2007	Young Artist Awards	The Suite Life of Zack & Cody	Best Performance in a TV Series (Comedy or Drama) – Leading Young Actor	Nominated	Nominated
2007	Popstar Magazine's Poptastic Awards	The Suite Life of Zack & Cody	Favorite Television Actor	Nominated	Nominated
2008	Kids' Choice Awards	The Suite Life of Zack & Cody	Favorite Television Actor	Nominated	Nominated
2008	Popstar Magazine's Poptastic Awards	The Suite Life of Zack & Cody	Favorite Television Actor	Nominated	Nominated
2009	Kids' Choice Awards	The Suite Life of Zack & Cody	Favorite Television Actor	Nominated	Won
2009	Popstar Magazine's Poptastic Awards	The Suite Life on Deck	Favorite Television Actor	Nominated	Nominated
2010	Kids' Choice Awards	The Suite Life on Deck	Favorite Television Actor	Nominated	Won
2011	Kids' Choice Awards	The Suite Life on Deck	Favorite Television Actor	Nominated	Won

== Discography ==
- 2005 – "A Dream Is a Wish Your Heart Makes" in Disneymania 4
- 2008 – "A Dream Is a Wish Your Heart Makes" in Princess Disneymania
