= Instant Pleasure =

Instant Pleasure may refer to:

- Instant gratification
- Instant Pleasure (album), a 2000 album by Rockell
- "Instant Pleasure" (song), a 2004 song by Seth Swirsky
- Instant Pleasures, an album by Shed Seven
