= The Suite Life Movie =

2011 television film directed by Sean McNamara

- Film poster
- Genre: Comedy drama Science fiction Family/Teen
- Based on: The Suite Life of Zack & Cody & The Suite Life on Deck by Danny Kallis & Jim Geoghan
- Screenplay by: Michael Saltzman; Robert Horn
- Directed by: Sean McNamara
- Starring: Cole Sprouse; Dylan Sprouse; Brenda Song; Debby Ryan; Matthew Timmons; John Ducey; Katelyn Pacitto; Kara Pacitto; Matthew Glave; Phill Lewis
- Theme music composer: John Van Tongeren
- Country of origin: United States
- Original language: English

Production
- Producers: Tracey Jeffrey; Pamela Eells O'Connell; Irene Dreayer; Dylan Sprouse; Cole Sprouse; Jessica Rhoades
- Cinematography: Attila Szalay
- Editor: David Moritz
- Running time: 79 minutes
- Production company: Bad Angels Productions

Original release
- Network: Disney Channel
- Release: March 25, 2011

The Suite Life Movie is a 2011 American science fiction comedy-drama television film directed by Sean McNamara, written by Michael Saltzman, and starring Dylan and Cole Sprouse, Brenda Song, Debby Ryan, Matthew Timmons, John Ducey, Matthew Glave, and Phill Lewis. The Disney Channel Original Movie is based on the Disney Channel sitcom The Suite Life on Deck, itself based on The Suite Life of Zack & Cody, created by Danny Kallis and Jim Geoghan. Dylan and Cole Sprouse were also executive producers for the movie. The film premiered on March 25, 2011 on the Disney Channel. A sneak peek was shown during the Disney Channel Shake It Up New Year's event.

== Plot ==
After making plans to spend spring break with his girlfriend Bailey Pickett, Cody Martin decides to leave the SS Tipton, a large cruise ship where he attends school, to work as an intern for Dr. Donald Spaulding (John Ducey) at a prestigious research firm instead, in hopes of obtaining a scholarship to Yale. Infuriated that Cody canceled his plans with her, Bailey refuses to speak to him. Meanwhile, Cody's twin brother Zack asks him for his car, which their parents promised to give to Cody when he goes to college, but Cody refuses.

After Zack runs a billion-dollar submarine into the seawall while attempting to impress a science assistant, Cody does the same while trying to stop him, resulting in their equipment being lost. Cody is kicked out of the program and fired. Furious, Cody disowns Zack and vows to never forgive him for what he did, claiming they may be twins, but they definitely are not brothers. Elsewhere, London Tipton accidentally eats a fruit given to the dolphins which allows her to understand them.

The Martin twins learn that although Cody will no longer be eligible to work as Dr. Spaulding's intern, both boys are ideal for the Gemini Project, led by Dr. Ronald Olsen, who studies the physical and emotional connection of twins. After much thought, the brothers agree and find themselves in a camp with hundreds of other twins. Dr. Olsen explains that the purpose of the project is to create an emotional bond between people with the hopes of putting an end to evil in the world. According to Dr. Olsen, to accomplish this, he must form a bond between twins. Over the course of the project, which uses the same fruit as Dr. Spaulding's experiments, Zack and Cody form a bond: first a physical bond, in which they can sense what the other is feeling, then empathy, or an emotional bond. During this period, Zack and Cody realize why the other needs what he needs (Cody needs the scholarship in order to be with Bailey in Yale, and Zack needs the car to help him find his "calling" faster, due to the fact that he still does not know what to do in his life). After they hug it out, they overhear a conversation that reveals Dr. Olsen has evil intentions. Meanwhile, Bailey discovers Cody's letter and reads it. She realizes Cody only wanted to obtain a scholarship to Yale and goes with London and Woody (Matthew Timmons) to find him and Zack.

At the institute, London learns from a dolphin that Zack and Cody are at the Gemini Project and alerts Dr. Spaulding who claims that the Martin twins may be in danger, while Bailey calls the manager of the SS Tipton, Mr. Moseby (Phill Lewis), to the site of the Gemini Project while they all go to save Zack and Cody. During this time, the brothers attempt to flee the island and the army of twins, who are now mind-controlled to go after the two. The army succeeds, as Zack and Cody are captured and taken back to the laboratory, where Bailey, London, Woody, and Dr. Spaulding find them. Dr. Olsen reveals that he is Dr. Spaulding's evil twin and explains that he spied on Zack and Cody earlier.

After telling each other off, Zack and Cody begin to merge, but the merge is unsuccessful because the twins get into an argument that escalates into a fight, ultimately destroying the Gemini Project and freeing all the other twins from Ronald's control. Ronald attempts to reboot the machine, but he is stopped by Cody who quickly forms a plan. He and Zack give the special fruit to the Spaulding twins, who finally understand each other by telepathically discovering they wanted to be like each other all along. Mr. Moseby arrives with the police who arrest Ronald. Zack and Cody now understand that they make a "pretty good team."

Afterward, Cody and Bailey have reconciled and visited landmarks together and Zack is driving his car, which Cody finally agreed to let him have. On the dock, Zack parks the car in a shipping area and sees his friends and brother on the SS Tipton. Unfortunately, the car is crushed by a shipping crate containing London's summer clothes. While Zack stares in shock, the movie ends with Mr. Moseby saying, "Well, spring break's over. Now if I could just make it to summer vacation."

== Cast ==
- Cole Sprouse as Cody Martin
- Dylan Sprouse as Zack Martin
- Brenda Song as London Tipton
- Debby Ryan as Bailey Pickett
- Matthew Timmons as Woody Fink
- Phill Lewis as Mr. Moseby
- John Ducey as Dr. Donald Spaulding / Dr. Ronald Spaulding
- Matthew Glave as Dr. Ronald Olsen
- Katelyn Pacitto as Nellie Smith
- Kara Pacitto as Kellie Smith
- Steven French as Ben
- John French as Sven
- Norman Misura as Fish Monger
- Russ Rossi as Sea Captain

== Broadcast ==
The film aired worldwide on Disney Channel. It premiered in the United Kingdom and Ireland on February 17, 2012. It premiered in Australia, New Zealand, Singapore, and the Philippines on June 25, 2011.

== Home media ==
The film was made available on iTunes starting April 5, 2011 and on Netflix to stream on April 24, 2011. As of November 12, 2019, the film, along with both Suite Life series, have been available to stream on Disney+.

== Reception ==
Sarah Peel of BSC Kids had a positive review of the film saying the film was "typical" but said she was surprised at "just how funny it was". She felt it was a good film for younger children to watch, rating the film a 7 out of 10.

The movie premiered with 5.2 million viewers. There were 780,000 viewers when it premiered in the United Kingdom and Ireland on February 17, 2012.
