= Big Daddy (1999 film) =

1999 film by Dennis Dugan

- Theatrical release poster
- Directed by: Dennis Dugan
- Screenplay by: Steve Franks; Tim Herlihy; Adam Sandler
- Story by: Steve Franks
- Produced by: Sid Ganis; Jack Giarraputo
- Starring: Adam Sandler; Joey Lauren Adams; Jon Stewart; Rob Schneider; Cole Sprouse; Dylan Sprouse; Leslie Mann
- Cinematography: Theo van de Sande
- Edited by: Jeff Gourson
- Music by: Teddy Castellucci
- Production companies: Columbia Pictures; Out of the Blue... Entertainment; Robert Simonds Productions; Jack Giarraputo Productions
- Distributed by: Sony Pictures Releasing
- Release date: June 25, 1999
- Running time: 93 minutes
- Country: United States
- Language: English
- Budget: $34.2 million
- Box office: $234.8 million

Big Daddy is a 1999 American comedy-drama film directed by Dennis Dugan, and written by Steve Franks, Tim Herlihy, and Adam Sandler. The film stars Sandler, Joey Lauren Adams, Jon Stewart, Rob Schneider, Dylan and Cole Sprouse, and Leslie Mann. The plot follows a 32-year-old man whose girlfriend leaves him for not accepting responsibility and then tries to be responsible by adopting a five-year-old boy who appears on his doorstep.

Big Daddy was released in the United States on June 25, 1999, by Sony Pictures Releasing, and received mixed reviews from critics. It was a success at the box office, grossing $234.8 million on a $34.2 million budget. It was nominated for five Golden Raspberry Awards and Sandler won the Worst Actor category.

== Plot ==
In New York City, Sonny Koufax is a 32-year-old slacker who graduated from law school but never took the bar exam. He works only one day a week as a toll booth attendant and lives comfortably off a $200,000 (Note: Around $395,000 in 2026) settlement from a minor accident. Lacking ambition and responsibility, Sonny spends his days lounging around, much to the frustration of his girlfriend Vanessa, who threatens to break up with him unless he grows up and changes his ways.

Sonny's roommate Kevin Gerrity, a successful lawyer, proposes to his girlfriend Corinne, a podiatrist, before leaving for China on a work assignment. Corinne accepts but openly dislikes Sonny, largely because he constantly mocks her former job at Hooters, which she worked while paying her way through school.

The next morning, Sonny wakes up to find a five-year-old boy named Julian McGrath abandoned at the apartment. A note explains that Julian's mother Jan can no longer care for him due to illness and claims that Kevin is Julian's biological father. Sonny contacts Kevin, who is shocked and confused by the news. Despite having no parenting experience, Sonny promises to take care of Julian until Kevin returns from China.

Hoping to win Vanessa back, Sonny introduces her to Julian, but she reveals that she is now dating Sid, an older and seemingly accomplished man whom she admires for his intelligence and clear five-year plan. Discouraged, Sonny struggles with the realities of caring for a child and soon becomes overwhelmed.

Frustrated, Sonny impersonates Kevin and takes Julian to social worker Arthur Brooks, asking that the boy be returned to his mother. Arthur instead informs him that Julian's mother has died of cancer and suggests placing Julian into foster care. Unable to allow that, Sonny reluctantly agrees to keep Julian until an adoptive family can be found.

Sonny vents about the situation to his father Lenny who is furious and believes Sonny is far too irresponsible to raise a child. Ignoring his father's doubts, Sonny decides to raise Julian his own way. Over time, Sonny and Julian form a strong bond, and Julian even helps Sonny begin a relationship with Layla, Corinne's sister and a lawyer. Meanwhile, Arthur finds a potential adoptive family for Julian but becomes suspicious when Sonny avoids returning his calls.

After Julian's teacher complains about the bad habits he has learned under Sonny's influence, Sonny reevaluates his parenting and makes a sincere effort to improve both his and Julian's behavior. Shortly afterward, Arthur arrives and confronts Sonny, having discovered that he impersonated Kevin, and threatens him with arrest unless he gives up Julian. Heartbroken, Sonny complies and turns Julian over much to Julian's sadness. Determined to fight for him, Sonny asks Layla to help prepare a legal case.

In court, Layla, Kevin, and Sonny's lawyer friends represent Sonny, while friends and acquaintances testify on his behalf. Layla has Julian testify as well, revealing details about his birth in Toronto, which triggers Kevin's memory. Sonny then takes the stand and asks Lenny to question him. Though Lenny initially doubts Sonny, he is ultimately convinced by his son's sincerity and growth, moving the entire courtroom and inspiring everyone to call their dads to express their love for them. Despite this, Judge Healy (Note: Despite the name on her bench stating "M. Healy", she is just credited as "Judge".) is still unconvinced, denies Sonny custody, and orders him remanded until sentencing. Kevin insists the charges be dropped as he admits that Julian was the result of a one-night stand years earlier. Judge Healy grants him custody pending a DNA test, and although Julian is devastated, Sonny promises he will always remain part of his life. After the test confirms Kevin is Julian's father, Sonny passes him to Kevin and the two begin bonding, while Sonny continues to stay involved.

One year later, Sonny has completely transformed his life. He is now a successful lawyer, married to Layla, and a father himself as well as being Julian's uncle. At a surprise birthday party at a Hooters location, Sonny encounters Vanessa (as a waitress) working alongside Sid (who's a line cook), whose once-promising plans never materialized. The film ends on a lighthearted note, highlighting how far Sonny has come.

== Cast ==
- Adam Sandler as Sonny Koufax, an unmotivated slacker and law school graduate who becomes Julian's guardian.
- Joey Lauren Adams as Layla Maloney, a lawyer, Corinne's older sister, and Sonny's new girlfriend.
- Jon Stewart as Kevin Gerrity, a lawyer who is Sonny's roommate and Julian’s biological father.
- Allen Covert as Phil D'Amato, a lawyer friend of Sonny's
- Rob Schneider as Nazo, a foreign delivery guy for Cozy Soup 'n' Burger known for his very bad deliveries who is one of Sonny's friends. (Note: Cozy Soup 'n' Burger is a real restaurant near Washington Square Park in New York's Greenwich Village neighborhood. It is thanked in the closing credits for having "the Best BLT (and sense of humor) in New York".)
- Josh Mostel as Arthur Brooks, Julian's social worker.
- Dylan and Cole Sprouse as Julian "Frankenstein" McGrath, the biological son of Kevin, who Sonny befriends and cares for in his absence.
- Leslie Mann as Corinne Maloney, a podiatrist and Kevin's fiancé.
- Jonathan Loughran as Mike, a friend of Sonny's.
- Peter Dante as Tommy Grayton, a lawyer friend of Sonny's and Phil's boyfriend.
- Kristy Swanson as Vanessa, Sonny's ex-girlfriend.
- Joseph Bologna as Lenny Koufax, Sonny's father who is a lawyer currently living in Florida.
- Steve Buscemi as a homeless guy who keeps encountering Sonny and who has a father in the military.

In addition, Carmen De Lavallade appears as the judge during the custody hearing, Geoffrey Horne appears as Vanessa's current boyfriend Sid, while other Adam Sandler film repeat regulars include Edmund Lyndeck as an elderly bar patron named Mr. Herlihy who claims that Sonny "fights like a girl", Steven Brill as lawyer Ted Castellucci who assists Brooks at the custody hearing, Sandler's future wife Jackie Titone as a waitress at the bar Sonny frequently visits and his niece and nephew Jillian and Jared Sandler as two people named Jillian and Jared. Dennis Dugan has an uncredited appearance as a reluctant trick-or-treat giver.

== Production ==
Principal photography took place in New York, while interior shots were done at Silvercup Studios from September 24 to December 21, 1998. Pete Davidson auditioned for a role. The script was originally titled Guy Gets Kid and was considered for Chris Farley, who died the year before.

== Reception ==
=== Box office ===
The film grossed $41.2 million on its opening weekend, ranking #1 at the box office. At the time of its release, it had the second-biggest opening weekend for a comedy, behind Austin Powers: The Spy Who Shagged Me (which was released two weeks earlier), as well as the highest grossing non-sequel comedy opening ever at the time. This also made it the highest opening weekend for an Adam Sandler film, replacing The Waterboy. The film would hold this record for four years until the opening of Anger Management in April 2003. In its second weekend, the film dropped 36 percent to $26.4 million over the Fourth of July weekend, ranking at #2 behind Wild Wild West. The film then grossed $16.3 million in its third weekend, ranking at #3 behind the latter film and American Pie.

=== Critical response ===
On Rotten Tomatoes, Big Daddy has an approval rating of 39% based on 92 reviews, and an average rating of 4.9/10. The site's critical consensus reads, "Adam Sandler acquits himself admirably, but his charm isn't enough to make up for Big Daddy's jarring shifts between crude humor and mawkish sentimentality." On Metacritic, the film has a weighted average score of 41 out of 100, based on reviews from 26 critics, indicating "mixed or average" reviews. Audiences surveyed by CinemaScore gave the film a grade B+.

Nathan Rabin of The A.V. Club called it "Sandler's best movie", noting that "Sandler possesses an innocence that makes the mean-spiritedness inherent in much of his work surprisingly palatable." Robert Koehler of Variety called it "a step forward for Adam Sandler, as well as a strategy to expand his audience. While the loyal male-teen aud[ience] core will not be disappointed with the spate of gags just for them, story contains solid date-movie material."

Kenneth Turan of the Los Angeles Times said: "There's no doubt Sandler is talented, but if he persists in believing that, like Elvis, his presence alone covers a multitude of omissions and inconsistencies, he will squander his gift and make a series of forgettable films in the process." Roger Ebert of the Chicago Sun-Times gave the film one-and-a-half out of four stars, describing the main character as "seriously disturbed" and the story as "predictable", although he did praise Joey Lauren Adams's character as "entertaining".

Director Paul Thomas Anderson is a noted fan of the film, considering it one of his favorites. Anderson would end up casting Sandler in Punch-Drunk Love.

=== Accolades ===
Year	Award	Category	Result
2000	Blockbuster Entertainment Awards	Favorite Actor - Comedy: Adam Sandler	Won
2000	Blockbuster Entertainment Awards	Favorite Supporting Actor - Comedy: Dylan and Cole Sprouse	Nominated
2000	Blockbuster Entertainment Awards	Favorite Supporting Actress - Comedy: Joey Lauren Adams	Nominated
2000	BMI Film & TV Awards	Teddy Castellucci	Won
2000	GLAAD Media Awards	Outstanding Film	Nominated
2000	Golden Raspberry Awards	Worst Picture	Nominated
2000	Golden Raspberry Awards	Worst Director: Dennis Dugan	Nominated
2000	Golden Raspberry Awards	Worst Actor: Adam Sandler	Won
2000	Golden Raspberry Awards	Worst Supporting Actor: Rob Schneider	Nominated
2000	Golden Raspberry Awards	Worst Screenplay: Steve Franks, Tim Herlihy & Adam Sandler	Nominated
2000	Kids' Choice Awards	Favorite Movie	Won
2000	Kids' Choice Awards	Favorite Movie Actor - Adam Sandler	Won
2000	MTV Movie & TV Awards	Best Comedic Performance - Adam Sandler	Won
2000	MTV Movie & TV Awards	Best Male Performance - Adam Sandler	Nominated
2000	MTV Movie & TV Awards	Best On-Screen Duo - Adam Sandler, Dylan and Cole Sprouse	Nominated
2000	People's Choice Awards	Favorite Comedy Motion Picture	Won
2000	Stinkers Bad Movie Awards	Most Painfully Unfunny Comedy	Nominated
2000	Stinkers Bad Movie Awards	Worst Screenplay for a Film Grossing Over $100M	Nominated
2000	Stinkers Bad Movie Awards	Worst Performance by a Child in a Feature Role: Dylan and Cole Sprouse	Nominated
1999	Teen Choice Awards	Film - Movie of the Summer	Won
2000	Young Artist Awards	Best Performance in a Feature Film - Young Actor Age Ten or Under: Dylan and Cole Sprouse	Nominated
1999	YoungStar Awards	Best Performance by a Young Actor in a Comedy Film: Dylan and Cole Sprouse	Nominated

== Soundtrack ==
Professional ratings
Review scores
Source	Rating
AllMusic	3.5/5 stars
dowse	positive
EW	B-

The film won a BMI Film Music Award. The soundtrack included the following:

Track listing

1. "Sweet Child o' Mine" by Sheryl Crow (Guns N' Roses cover)
2. "When I Grow Up" by Garbage
3. "Peace Out" by Adam Sandler (a sound clip from a scene in the movie)
4. "Just Like This" by Limp Bizkit
5. "Only Love Can Break Your Heart" by Everlast (a Neil Young cover)
6. "Ga Ga" by Melanie C
7. "What Is Life" by George Harrison, covered in movie by Shawn Mullins
8. "The Kiss" by Adam Sandler (a sound clip from a scene in the movie)
9. "Instant Pleasure" by Rufus Wainwright
10. "Ooh La La" by The Wiseguys
11. "Sid" by Adam Sandler (a sound clip from a scene in the movie)
12. "If I Can't Have You" by Yvonne Elliman
13. "Smelly Kid" by Adam Sandler (a sound clip from a scene in the movie)
14. "Passin' Me By" by The Pharcyde (a sound clip from a scene in the movie)
15. "Rush" by Big Audio Dynamite
16. "Hooters" by Allen Covert (a sound clip from a scene in the movie)
17. "Babe" by Styx
18. "Overtime" by Adam Sandler (a sound clip from a scene in the movie)
19. "The Kangaroo Song" by Tim Herlihy (made specifically for the movie)
20. "The Best of Times" by Styx (only a portion of the song)

Other songs used in the film

- "Dancing in the Moonlight" by The CrownSayers (originally done by Boffalongo and made famous by King Harvest)
- "Sweet Dreams (Are Made of This)" by Eurythmics
- "Sweet Child o' Mine" (a re-recorded version taken from a live version played by Guns N' Roses mixed with a recording with the 1999 Guns N' Roses lineup.)
- "Jump" by Van Halen (background music on the answering machine message in Sonny's apartment)
- "Growin' Up" by Bruce Springsteen
- "Save It For Later" by Harvey Danger (originally by The English Beat)
- "Blue Collar Man (Long Nights)" by Styx
- "Night's Interlude" by Nightmares on Wax (song played during the opening credits)
- "Fooled Around and Fell in Love" by Elvin Bishop

Songs from the theatrical trailer but not in the film

- "Doo Wa Ditty (Blow That Thing)" by Zapp and Roger
- "You Get What You Give" by New Radicals
