= Danimals =

American food type brand

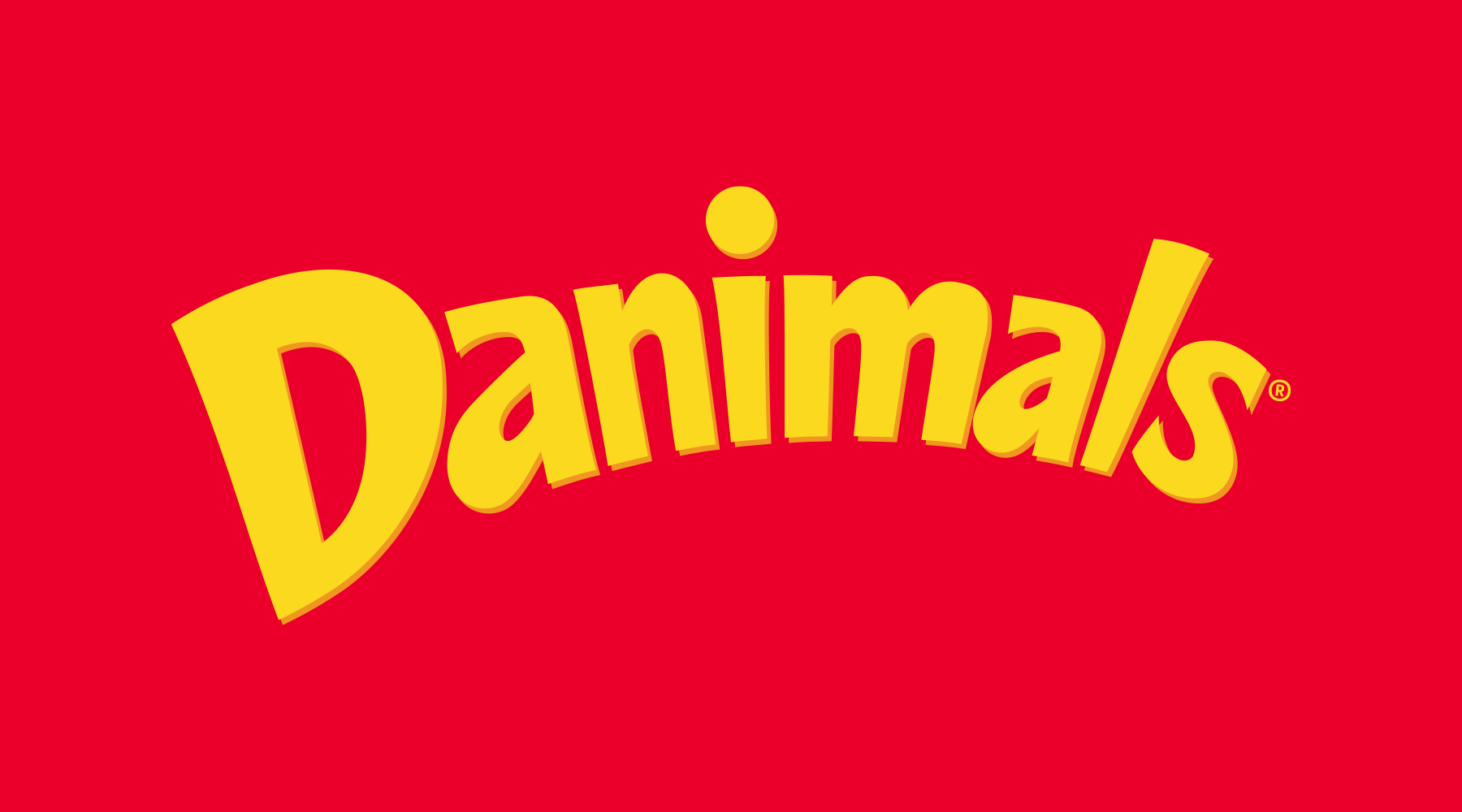
- Logo used from 2020 to 2026
- Type: Private
- Industry: Dairy products
- Founded: 1994; 32 years ago
- Products: Yogurt
- Parent: Dannon
- Website: danimals.com

Danimals is an American brand of low-fat drinkable yogurt. Launched by Dannon in 1994, its packaging is decorated with pictures of wild animals and is popular among children and in school lunches.

== History ==
Danimals parent company Dannon popularized yogurt in the United States in the 1950s and has remained the nation's leading producer of yogurt. Danimals was released in 1994 and initially donated a small part of their proceeds to the National Wildlife Federation. Intended to be marketed to children, Dannon's marketing team told a New York Times reporter that "Yogurt hasn't been very kid-friendly in the past because the taste was too sour. This is a way of creating a new generation of yogurt eaters."

Danimals was promoted by Dylan and Cole Sprouse, the stars of The Suite Life of Zack & Cody. They starred in various commercials and in 2009 were part of a sweepstake with a grand prize of $10,000 and a trip to Hollywood to meet the Sprouses. Danimals was also promoted by Ross Lynch and Bella Thorne, at the time stars of Disney Channel's series Austin & Ally and Shake It Up respectively. They starred in multiple commercials from 2013 to 2014 and promoted a sweepstake for a trip to Walt Disney World.

== Variations ==
One variation of the product is Danimals Yo-Tubes, which lets kids squeeze yogurt out of a tube. The same design concept is used in Danimals Squeezables. The Danimals Crush Cup was a similar product that allowed consumers to squeeze yogurt out of a specially designed cup without the need for a spoon.

In 2020, Danimals launched Super Danimals, a probiotic version of their product advertised as supporting the immune system.

== Ingredients and nutrition ==
Danimals used to have 14 grams of sugar per serving, but in 2013 Dannon cut the sugar in the product to 9 grams per 50-calorie serving, accounting for 72 percent of the total calories. Their fruit flavors do not contain any real fruit.
