= Thor's Skyr =

Icelandic-style cultured dairy product

- Place of origin: Reykjavík
- Main ingredients: Cultured whole milk
- Food energy (per 170 g serving): 130 kcal (540 kJ)
Nutritional value
(per 170 g serving)
- Protein: 18–21 g
- Fat: 4–4.5 g
- Carbohydrate: 5–9 g
- Other information: www.thorsskyr.com

Thor's Skyr is an Icelandic-style high-protein skyr made in the US from cultured whole milk, known for its affiliation with the 'strength and physical culture' lore.

Based on a 1,000-year-old Icelandic recipe, it is manufactured through multiple ultra-filtrations of milk, taking four cups of milk to produce one cup of the base product. The result is extra thick and smooth in texture, high in slow-releasing casein protein and probiotics, and low in lactose.

Founded in 2020 by Unnar Helgi Daníelsson, Hafþór Júlíus Björnsson, Dylan Sprouse and Terry Crews, Thor's Skyr is manufactured in Pennsylvania, United States and comes in four varieties.

Product specifications
	Plain	Vanilla	Strawberry	Blueberry
Main ingredients	cultured whole milk	cultured whole milk, vanilla bean specks	cultured whole milk, strawberries	cultured whole milk, blueberries
Other ingredients	None	locust bean gum, stevia sweetener, allulose, cane sugar, tapioca flour		
Live and active cultures	Streptococcus thermophilus, Lactobacillus bulgaricus, Lactobacillus acidophilus Lactobacillus bifidus and Lacticaseibacillus rhamnosus			
Serving	170 grams			
Energy	130 kcal			
Protein	21 grams	18 grams		
Fat	4.5 grams	4 grams		
Carbohydrate	5 grams	8 grams		9 grams
Added Sugar	None	1 gram		
