= A Modern Twain Story: The Prince and the Pauper =

The Prince and the Pauper
- DVD cover art
- Directed by: James Quattrochi
- Produced by: Joseph A. Reilly; Nick Vallelonga
- Starring: Dylan Sprouse; Cole Sprouse; Kay Panabaker
- Music by: Dennis McCarthy
- Production company: Oak Films
- Distributed by: Sony Pictures Home Entertainment
- Release date: September 15, 2007
- Country: United States
- Language: English

A Modern Twain Story: The Prince and the Pauper also known as The Prince and the Pauper: The Movie (or simply The Prince and the Pauper) is a 2007 American comedy film directed by James Quattrochi and starring Dylan and Cole Sprouse. The plot is based on the 1881 novel by Mark Twain, adapted by Amanda Moresco.

== Plot ==
From a young age, Tom Canty has wanted to become an actor, partly due to his neighbor and best friend, former actor Miles. Meanwhile, teen star Eddie Tudor is frustrated with being told what to do all the time and doesn't seem so interested in acting.

While Eddie is making a movie in Palm Beach, Florida, Tom sneaks onto the set and the boys meet. Tom tries on one of Eddie's costumes and Eddie realizes that he and Tom are identical in appearance. Just as Eddie is called to the set, he puts on Tom's clothes and leaves a startled Tom in his place. Eddie meets Tom's dad "Pop," who picks him up from the sidewalk, thinking he is Tom.

The next day, Eddie and Pop go to work at Pop's landscaping business, where Eddie tells him that he's not Tom and explains what happened. Pop starts thinking that "Tom" has gone mad. Meanwhile, after some initial difficulty, the real Tom adjusts to his new life and proves to be a 'better Eddie than Eddie', according to Elizabeth, Eddie's co-star.

When the production moves to Miami, Eddie decides to get to the film set himself. First, he hotwires his boat, then steals Miles' car and drives off in it. Pop and Miles follow him in Pop's truck. At the film set in Miami, Miles and Pop bluff their way in by saying that they are extras. They ask if there has been a kid pretending to be Eddie Tudor trying to sneak in, to which the security guard replies, "No sir, not yet".

Eddie arrives on set, spots Tom, and they have a brawl. Eventually, all calms down and everyone finds out who is who and what has happened. Eddie's mother reunites with Miles, whom she used to date before Eddie was born. The movie ends with Eddie and Miles getting to know each other as father and son and Miles and Eddie's mom hinting to each other about getting back together.

== Cast ==
- Cole Sprouse as Eddie Tudor
- Dylan Sprouse as Tom Canty
- Kay Panabaker as Elizabeth
- Vincent Spano as Miles
- Dedee Pfeiffer as Harlen
- Sally Kellerman as Jerry
- Ed Lauter as Pop

== Soundtrack ==
The soundtrack features music by Frequency 5 including "So Good So Strange" produced by Taboo from The Black Eyed Peas; it also includes "Life Is Good" performed by Junk, as well as "Beautiful Way", by Live Society, and "Here I Go Again" performed by Jessa. A cover of Skye Sweetnam's "This Is Me" (the opening track to The Barbie Diaries), sung by Kay Panabaker is featured.

== Distribution ==
The film was distributed in the United States in 2007, after its premiere at the 2007 Temecula Valley International Film & Music Festival. It was then internationally distributed, and broadcast on Disney Channel in Germany on 14 December 2008.

== Reception ==
Carrie Wheadon from Common Sense Media gave the film two out of five stars, calling it a "slow story for Zack and Cody fans only." A critic from The Dove Foundation wrote that "This is a fun film with a modern twist to the Mark Twain story, “The Prince and the Pauper”".
