= Dylan Sprouse =

American actor (born 1992)

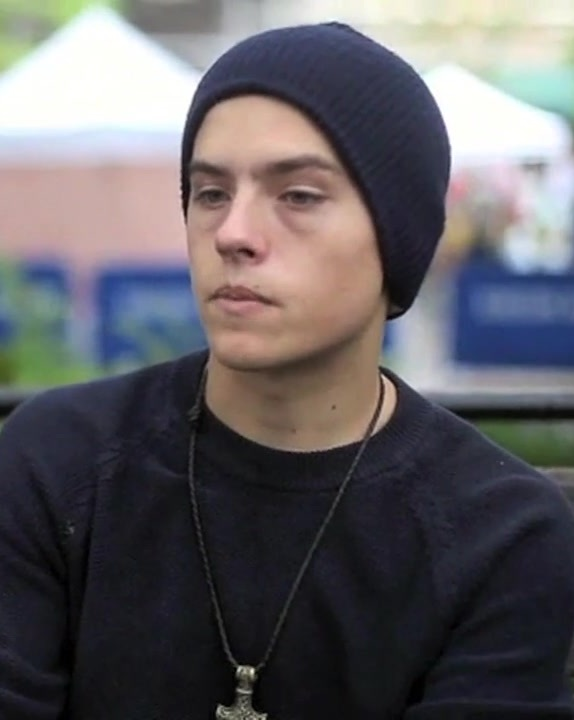
- Sprouse in 2012
- Born: Dylan Thomas Sprouse; August 4, 1992 (age 34); Arezzo, Tuscany, Italy
- Education: New York University
- Occupation: Actor
- Years active: 1993–2012; 2017–present
- Known for: The Suite Life of Zack & Cody
- Spouse: Barbara Palvin (m. 2023)
- Children: 1
- Relatives: Cole Sprouse (twin brother)

Dylan Thomas Sprouse (born August 4, 1992) is an American actor. He is known for his role as Zack Martin on the Disney Channel series The Suite Life of Zack & Cody and its spin-off, The Suite Life on Deck, where he starred alongside his twin brother Cole Sprouse. He is one of the owners of All-Wise Meadery in Brooklyn, New York.

== Early life ==
Sprouse was born August 4, 1992, in Arezzo, Italy, to American parents, Matthew Sprouse and Melanie Wright. Dylan was born 15 minutes before his twin brother Cole Sprouse and was named after Welsh poet and writer Dylan Thomas. When the twins were four months old, they moved to Long Beach, California, their parents' hometown.

== Career ==
Sprouse started his career in 1993 on television, alongside his twin brother Cole Sprouse, sharing the role of Patrick Kelly in Grace Under Fire until 1998. For the next several years, he continued to appear in several films and television series with his brother. Sprouse co-starred alongside his brother in the Disney Channel series The Suite Life of Zack & Cody from 2005 to 2008; during his time on the show he was, according to Kim Rhodes, body-shamed for putting on weight.

In 2017, Sprouse was cast in the lead role of Lucas Ward for the thriller film Dismissed. In the same year, he appeared in a short film, Carte Blanche, and was cast in comedy film Banana Split as Nick. In 2018, Sprouse opened All-Wise Meadery in Williamsburg, Brooklyn, the name of which is a reference to his Heathen religion. He joined the short film Daddy as Paul in 2019. In 2020, Sprouse starred as Trevor in After We Collided, the sequel to the 2019 film After. In May 2020, it was announced that Heavy Metal and DiGa Studios would be releasing the first issue of Sprouse's comic book Sun Eater. In 2021, he starred in Tyger Tyger as Luke Hart and in the Chinese film The Curse of Turandot as Calaf.

== Personal life ==
After the end of The Suite Life on Deck in 2011, Sprouse attended New York University's Gallatin School of Individualized Study and obtained a four-year degree in video game design. He has identified as a Heathen since age 15.

Sprouse is a co-founder and brand ambassador of Thor's Skyr, an American-made high-protein cultured dairy product.

Sprouse began a relationship with model Barbara Palvin in 2018. They resided in Brooklyn for over two years, before moving to Los Angeles in 2021. The couple married on July 15, 2023. In May 2026, they announced that they are expecting their first child. Their daughter was born in September of that year.

== Filmography ==
With the exception of Piggy Banks and Snow Buddies, all appearances prior to 2017 were either roles shared with Cole Sprouse—that is, in which the two portrayed one single character—or projects on which they both worked but portrayed separate characters.

=== Film ===
Year	Title	Role	Notes	Ref.
1999	The Astronaut's Wife	Twin		
1999	Big Daddy	Julian McGrath		
2001	Diary of a Sex Addict	Sammy Jr.	Direct-to-video film	
2001	I Saw Mommy Kissing Santa Claus	Justin Carver		
2002	Eight Crazy Nights	KB Toys soldier	Voice	
2002	The Master of Disguise	Young Pistachio Disguisey		
2003	Apple Jack	Jack Pyne	Short film	
2003	Just for Kicks	Dylan Martin	Direct-to-video film	
2004	The Heart Is Deceitful Above All Things	Older Jeremiah		
2005	Born Killers	Young John	Also known as Piggy Banks	
2006	Holidaze: The Christmas That Almost Didn't Happen	Kid	Voice; direct-to-video film	
2007	A Modern Twain Story: The Prince and the Pauper	Tom Canty		
2008	Snow Buddies	Shasta	Voice; direct-to-video film	
2009	The Kings of Appletown	Will		
2010	Kung-Fu Magoo	Justin Magoo	Direct-to-video film	
2017	Dismissed	Lucas Ward	Direct-to-video film	
2017	That High and Lonesome Sound		Short film	
2018	Banana Split	Nick		
2019	Carte Blanche	Gideon Blake	Short film	
2019	Daddy	Paul	Short film	
2020	After We Collided	Trevor		
2021	The Curse of Turandot	Calaf / Blue Eyes		
2021	Tyger Tyger	Luke Hart		
2022	My Fake Boyfriend	Jake		
2023	Beautiful Disaster	Travis Maddox		
2024	Beautiful Wedding	Travis Maddox		
2024	The Duel	Colin		
2024	Aftermath	Eric Daniels		
2025	Under Fire	Agent Griff		
2025	Neglected	The Kid		

=== Television ===
Year	Title	Role	Notes	Ref.
1993–1998	Grace Under Fire	Patrick Kelly	Main role	
1998	Mad TV	Kid	2 episodes	
2001	The Nightmare Room	Buddy	Episode: "Scareful What You Wish For"	
2001	That '70s Show	Bobby	Episode: "Eric's Depression"	
2005–2008	The Suite Life of Zack & Cody	Zack Martin	Lead role	
2006	The Emperor's New School	Zam	Voice; episode: "Oops, All Doodles/Chipmunky Business"	
2006	That's So Raven	Zack Martin	Episode: "Checkin' Out"	
2008	According to Jim	Himself	Episode: "I Drink Your Milkshake"	
2008–2011	The Suite Life on Deck	Zack Martin	Lead role	
2009	Wizards of Waverly Place	Zack Martin	Episode: "Cast-Away (To Another Show)"	
2009	Hannah Montana	Zack Martin	Episode: "Super(stitious) Girl"	
2010	I'm in the Band	Zack Martin	Episode: "Weasels on Deck"	
2011	The Suite Life Movie	Zack Martin	Television film	
2012	So Random!	Himself	Episode: "Cole and Dylan Sprouse"	
2021	Saturday Morning All Star Hits!	Sean Benjamin	2 episodes	
2026	Big City Greens	Tyler (voice)	Episode: "Gloria's Green"	

=== Music videos ===
Year	Title	Artist(s)	Role	Ref.
2018	"Consequences"	Camila Cabello	Love Interest	
2019	"Think About You"	Kygo featuring Valerie Broussard	Jax	
2022	"The Widow Maker"	Carpenter Brut featuring Gunship	Bret Halford	

=== Video games ===
Year	Title	Role	Notes	Ref.
2018	Total War: Warhammer II	Alith Anar		
2019	Kingdom Hearts III	Yozora		

=== Other ===
Year	Title	Role	Notes	Ref.
2018	The Super Slow Show	Himself	Web series; episode: "Hollywood Stunt Falls in Slow Motion"	

== Awards and nominations ==
Year	Award	Category	Work	Result
1999	YoungStar Awards	Best Performance by a Young Actor in a Comedy Film	Big Daddy	Nominated
2000	Blockbuster Entertainment Awards	Favorite Supporting Actor – Comedy	Big Daddy	Nominated
2000	MTV Movie Awards	Best On-Screen Duo	Big Daddy	Nominated
2000	Young Artist Awards	Best Performance in a Feature Film – Young Actor Age Ten or Under	Big Daddy	Nominated
2006	Young Artist Awards	Best Performance in a TV Series (Comedy or Drama) – Leading Young Actor	The Suite Life of Zack & Cody	Nominated
2007	Popstar Magazine's Poptastic Awards	"Favorite Television Actor"	The Suite Life of Zack & Cody	Nominated
2007	Young Artist Awards	Best Performance in a TV Series (Comedy or Drama) – Leading Young Actor	The Suite Life of Zack & Cody	Nominated
2008	Kids' Choice Awards	Favorite Television Actor	The Suite Life of Zack & Cody	Nominated
2008	Popstar Magazine's Poptastic Awards	Favorite Television Actor	The Suite Life of Zack & Cody	Nominated
2009	Kids' Choice Awards	Favorite Television Actor	The Suite Life of Zack & Cody	Won
2009	Popstar Magazine's Poptastic Awards	Favorite Television Actor	The Suite Life on Deck	Nominated
2010	Kids' Choice Awards	Favorite Television Actor	The Suite Life on Deck	Won
2011	Kids' Choice Awards	Favorite Television Actor	The Suite Life on Deck	Won

== Discography ==
- "A Dream Is a Wish Your Heart Makes" (Disneymania 4) (2005)
- "A Dream Is a Wish Your Heart Makes" (Princess Disneymania) (2008)
