= Just for Kicks (2003 film) =

Just 4 Kicks!
- Film poster
- Directed by: Sydney J. Bartholomew Jr.
- Produced by: Alessandro F. Uzielli
- Starring: Dylan Sprouse; Cole Sprouse; Tom Arnold; Bill Dawes; Wesley Singerman
- Cinematography: Christopher C. Pearson
- Edited by: Sam Seig
- Music by: William Goodrum
- Production company: Commotion Pictures
- Distributed by: MGM Home Entertainment
- Release date: September 26, 2003
- Country: United States
- Language: English

Just 4 Kicks is a 2003 American sports comedy film starring Dylan and Cole Sprouse as Dylan and Cole Martin and Tom Arnold as their father and coach. The film was released by MGM Home Entertainment on September 26, 2003.

== Synopsis ==
The plot concerns identical twin brothers who love soccer, but whose team plays badly. When the twins' dad, who's also the coach of their team, has to go away on a business trip, the twins' mother acts as the coach until their dad comes back. Unfortunately, she's not as good at soccer as her husband is, and the twins' soccer team soon starts getting made fun of for having a woman as their coach. In response, the twins set out to find a different coach for their soccer team.

They find that a local mechanic named Rudy, who saves them from getting run over by a car, is an excellent soccer player, and want him to help their mom coach their soccer team. It later turns that "Rudy" is actually George Patrick Owens, a famous professional soccer player from Ireland. With George helping the twins' mom coach the team, they and their soccer team embark on the road to a championship for their local soccer league (which they do end up winning).

== Cast ==
- Cole Sprouse as Cole Martin
- Dylan Sprouse as Dylan Martin
- Wesley Singerman as Sal
- Tom Arnold as Presscott Martin
- Lori Sebourn as Mandy Martin
- Jenna Gering as Louise
- Bill Dawes as Rudy
- Cobi Jones as Delivery Man

== See also ==
- Switching Goals
- List of association football films
