= The Suite Life on Deck =

American teen sitcom (2008–2011)

- Genre: Teen sitcom
- Created by: Danny Kallis & Jim Geoghan
- Developed by: Danny Kallis & Pamela Eells O'Connell
- Showrunners: Danny Kallis (seasons 1–2); Jim Geoghan (seasons 1–2); Pamela Eells O'Connell (season 3)
- Starring: Cole Sprouse; Dylan Sprouse; Brenda Song; Debby Ryan; Phill Lewis; Doc Shaw
- Theme music composer: Gary Scott (music); Steve Hampton & John Adair (lyrics)
- Opening theme: "Livin' the Suite Life", performed by Steve Rushton
- Ending theme: "Livin' the Suite Life" (instrumental)
- Composer: Gary Scott
- Country of origin: United States
- Original language: English
- No. of seasons: 3
- No. of episodes: 71 (list of episodes)

Production
- Executive producers: Pamela Eells O'Connell; Irene Dreayer; Danny Kallis (seasons 1–2); Jim Geoghan (seasons 1–2)
- Producer: Walter Barnett (seasons 2–3)
- Production locations: Hollywood Center Studios; Hollywood, California
- Cinematography: Alan Keath Walker; Darryl Palagi
- Editor: Jim Miley
- Camera setup: Videotape; Multi-camera (FilmLook, season 1; filmized, seasons 2–3)
- Running time: approx. 23–24 minutes
- Production companies: It's a Laugh Productions; Danny Kallis Productions (seasons 1–2); Bon Mot Productions (season 3)

Original release
- Network: Disney Channel
- Release: September 26, 2008 – May 6, 2011

Related
- The Suite Life of Zack & Cody (2005–08)

The Suite Life on Deck is an American teen sitcom created by Danny Kallis and Jim Geoghan, and developed by Kallis and Pamela Eells O'Connell. The series aired on the Disney Channel from September 26, 2008, to May 6, 2011. It is a sequel/spin-off of The Suite Life of Zack & Cody. The series follows twin brothers Cody and Zack Martin and hotel heiress London Tipton in a new setting, the SS Tipton, where they study-abroad at Seven Seas High School and meet Bailey Pickett while Mr. Moseby manages the ship. The ship travels around the world to nations such as Italy, France, Greece, India, Sweden and the United Kingdom where the characters experience different cultures, adventures, and situations.

The series' pilot aired at an earlier date in the UK on September 19, 2008, and in U.S. markets on September 26, 2008. The series premiere on the Disney Channel in the U.S. drew 5.7 million viewers, and it became the most watched series premiere in Canada on the Family Channel. The show was also TV's No. 1 series in Kids 6–11 and No. 1 scripted series in tweens 9–14 in 2008, outpacing veteran series Hannah Montana and Wizards of Waverly Place in the ratings. On October 19, 2009, it was announced that the series had been renewed for a third season, which began production in January 2010 and debuted on July 2, 2010. The series was also 2009's top rated scripted series among all children ages 6 to 14.

The series has been broadcast in more than 30 countries worldwide and was shot at Hollywood Center Studios in Los Angeles (as was the original series). The series was taped in front of a live studio audience, though a laugh track is used for some scenes. The series is the second spin-off of a Disney Channel series (after the short-lived That's So Raven spin-off Cory in the House); as well as the last Disney Channel series to debut broadcasting exclusively in standard definition, and the first of three Disney Channel shows to transition from standard definition to high definition, which occurred on August 7, 2009, with the season 2 premiere, "The Spy Who Shoved Me", and the second multi-camera comedy (after Sonny with a Chance) to utilize a filmized appearance instead of the Filmlook appearance that was used in the first season.

On March 25, 2011, a film based on The Suite Life on Deck and its parent series, titled The Suite Life Movie aired on Disney Channel. The series' forty-minute finale episode, "Graduation on Deck", aired on Disney Channel on May 6, 2011, officially ending the series.

== Premise ==
Sometime after the events of the previous series, Mr. Moseby has been transferred to manage the SS Tipton, a cruise ship owned by Mr. Tipton. Aboard the ship, Zack and Cody Martin enroll at Seven Seas High School, a Semester at Sea-like study-abroad program offered on the ship, receiving affordability discounts due to their mother being a Tipton employee. London Tipton is also forced to attend the program under the direction of her father, with Mr. Moseby remaining responsible for her. A small-town farm girl named Bailey Pickett also enrolls for the program. The twins set on a range of new adventures and make new friends, as they begin attending classes on the cruise ship, while the ship sails around the world.

== Cast ==
=== Main ===
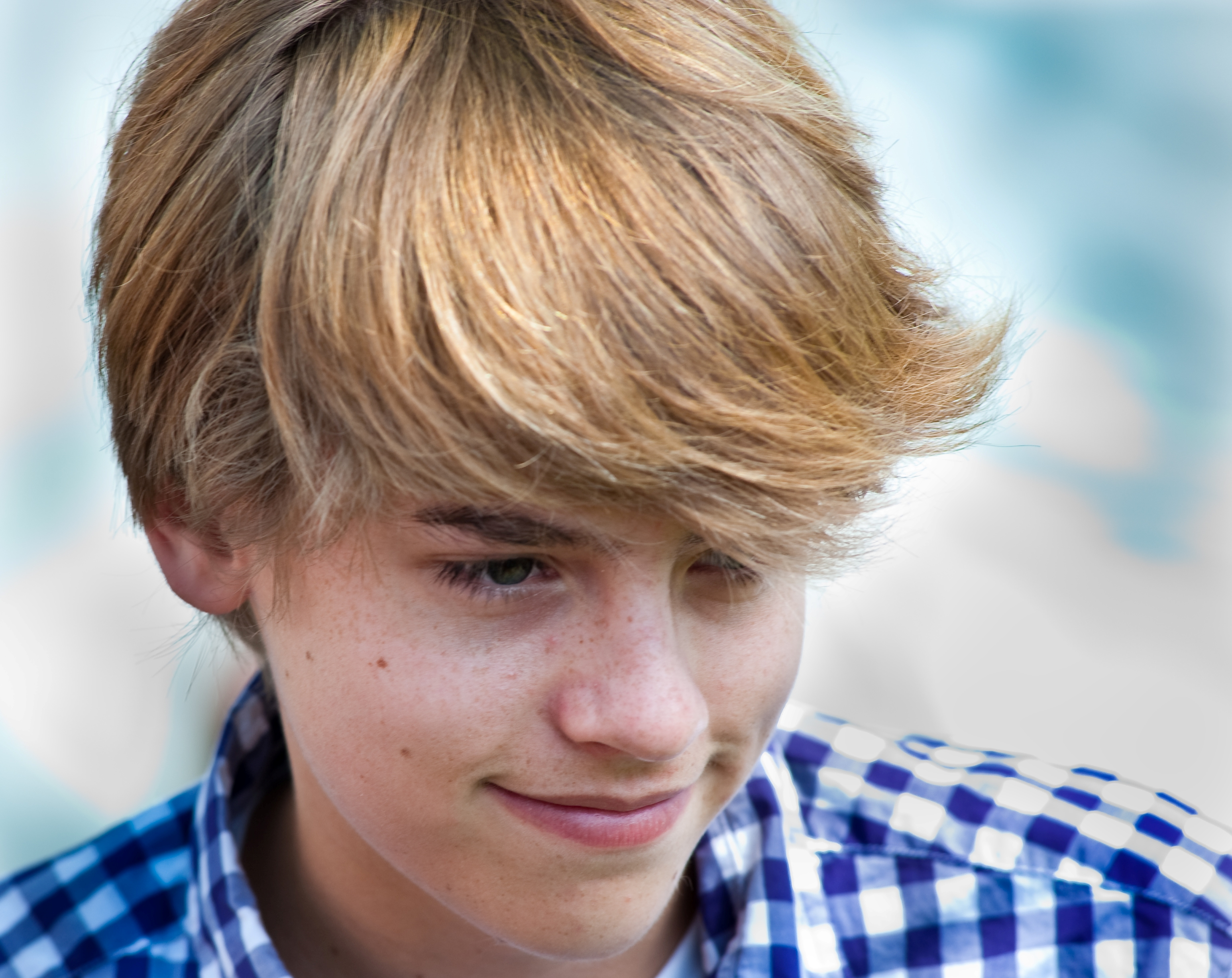
Cole Sprouse plays Cody Martin

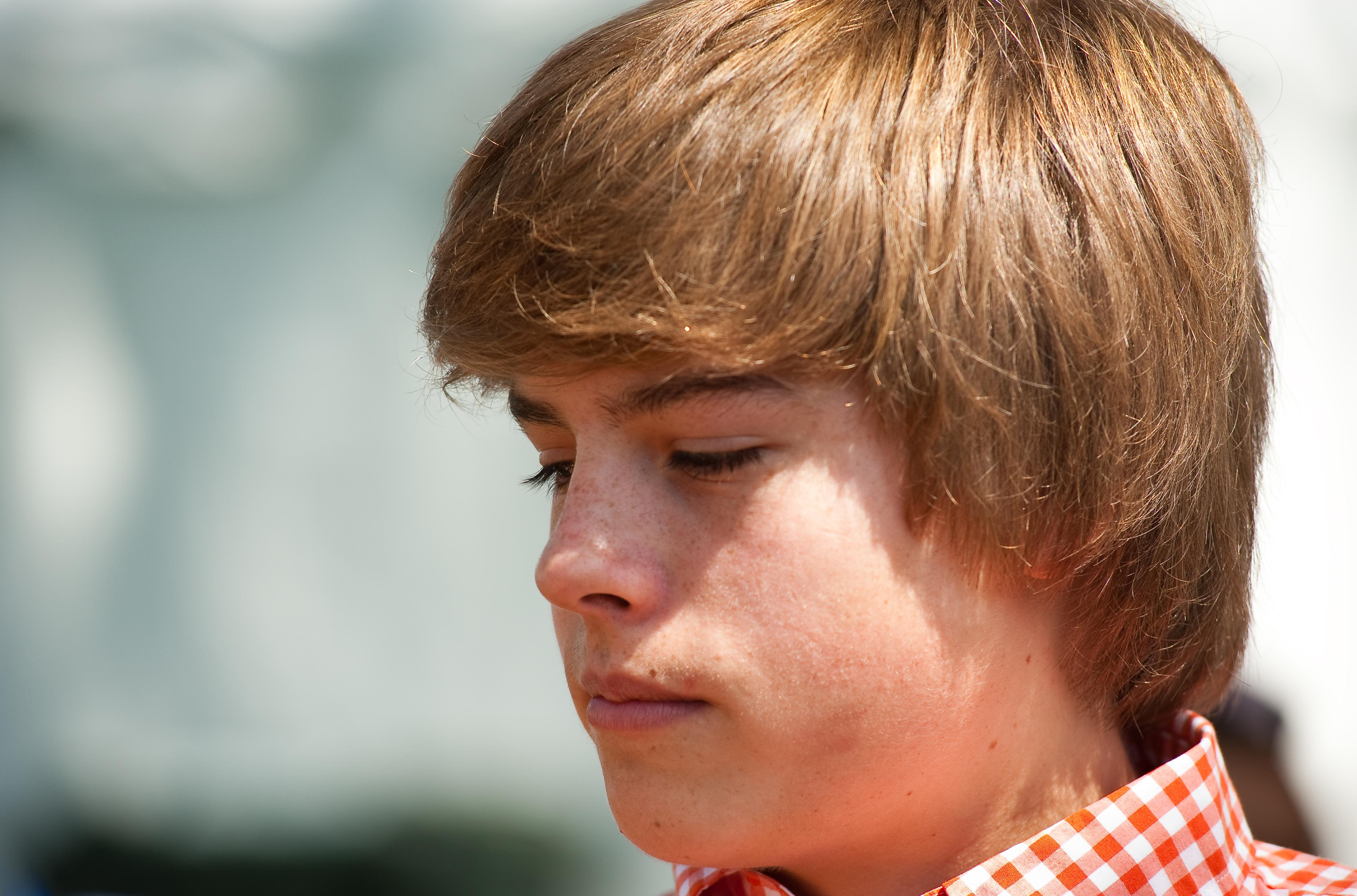
Dylan Sprouse plays Zack Martin

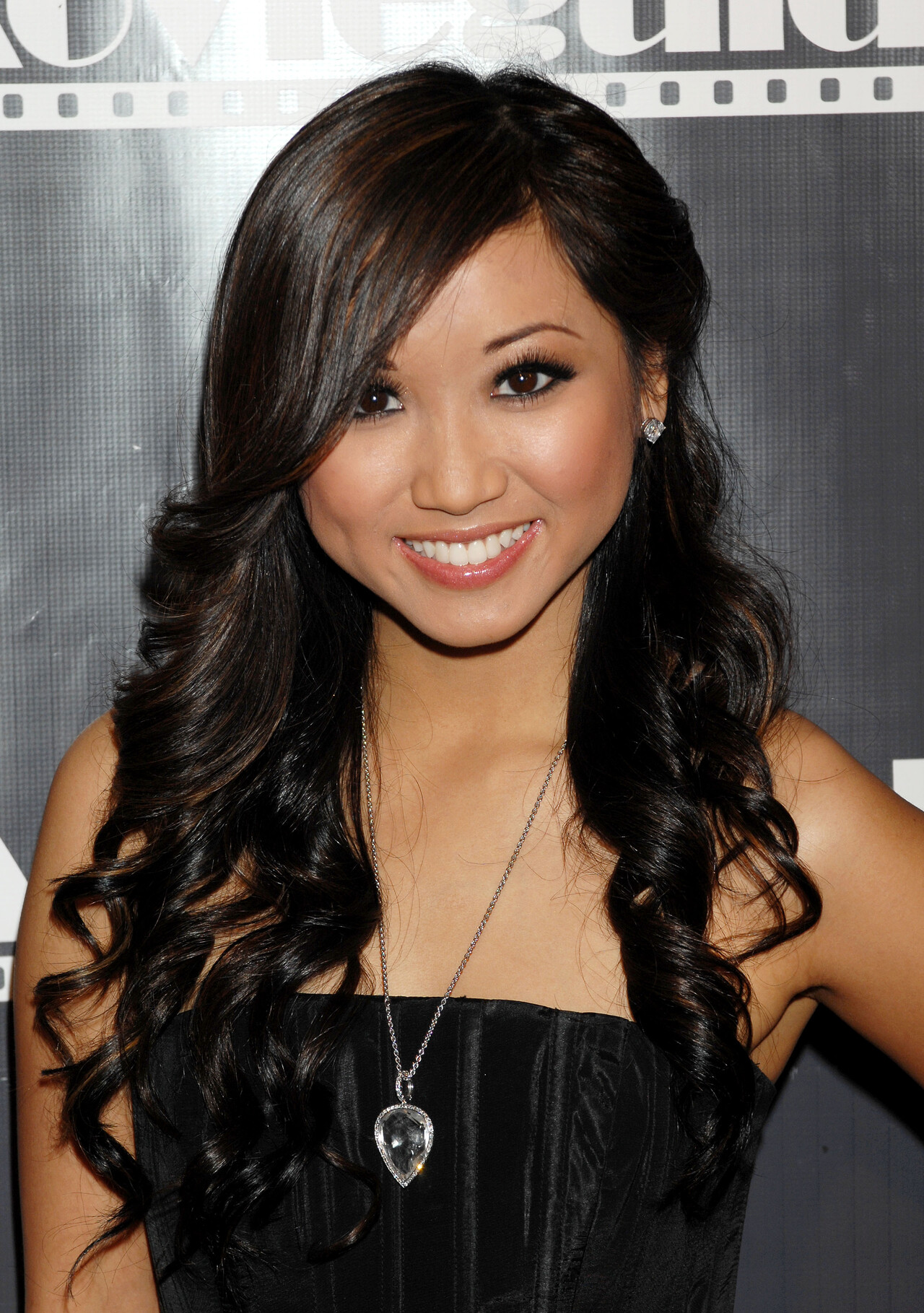
Brenda Song plays London Tipton

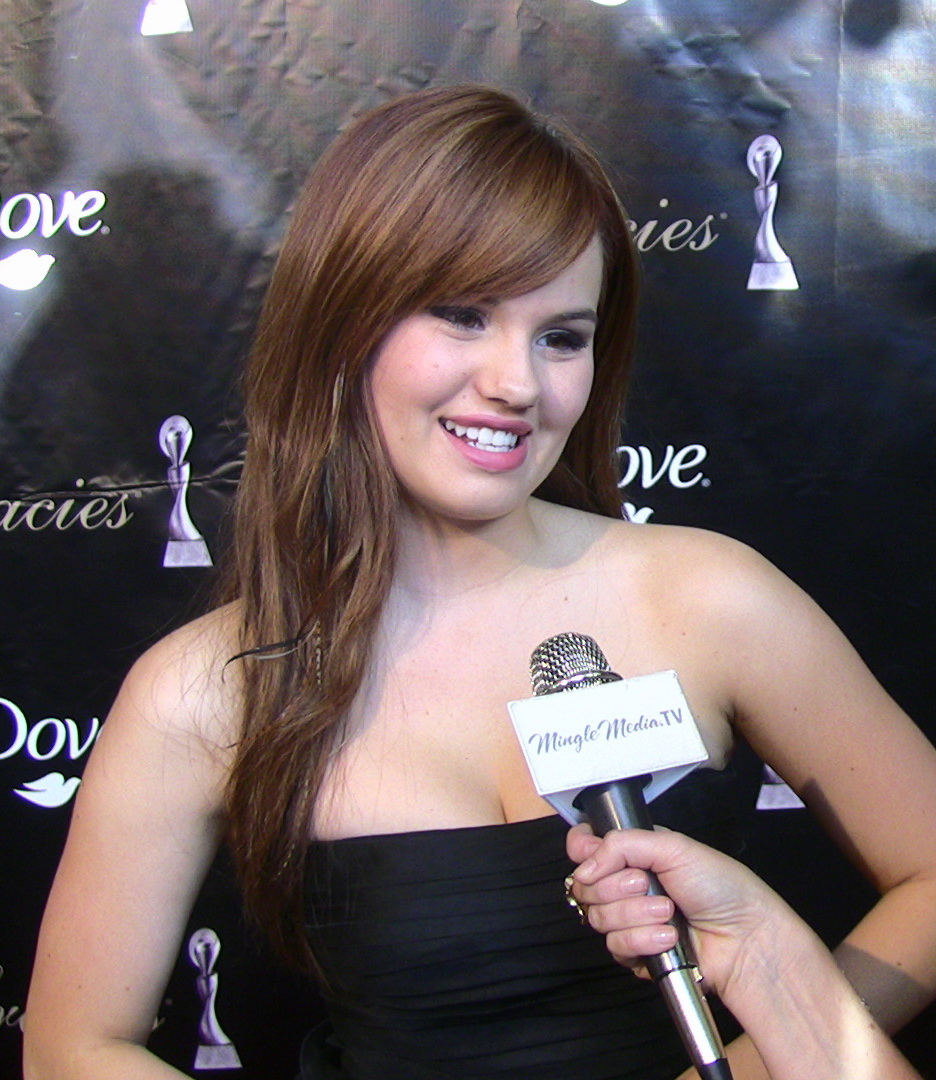
Debby Ryan plays Bailey Pickett

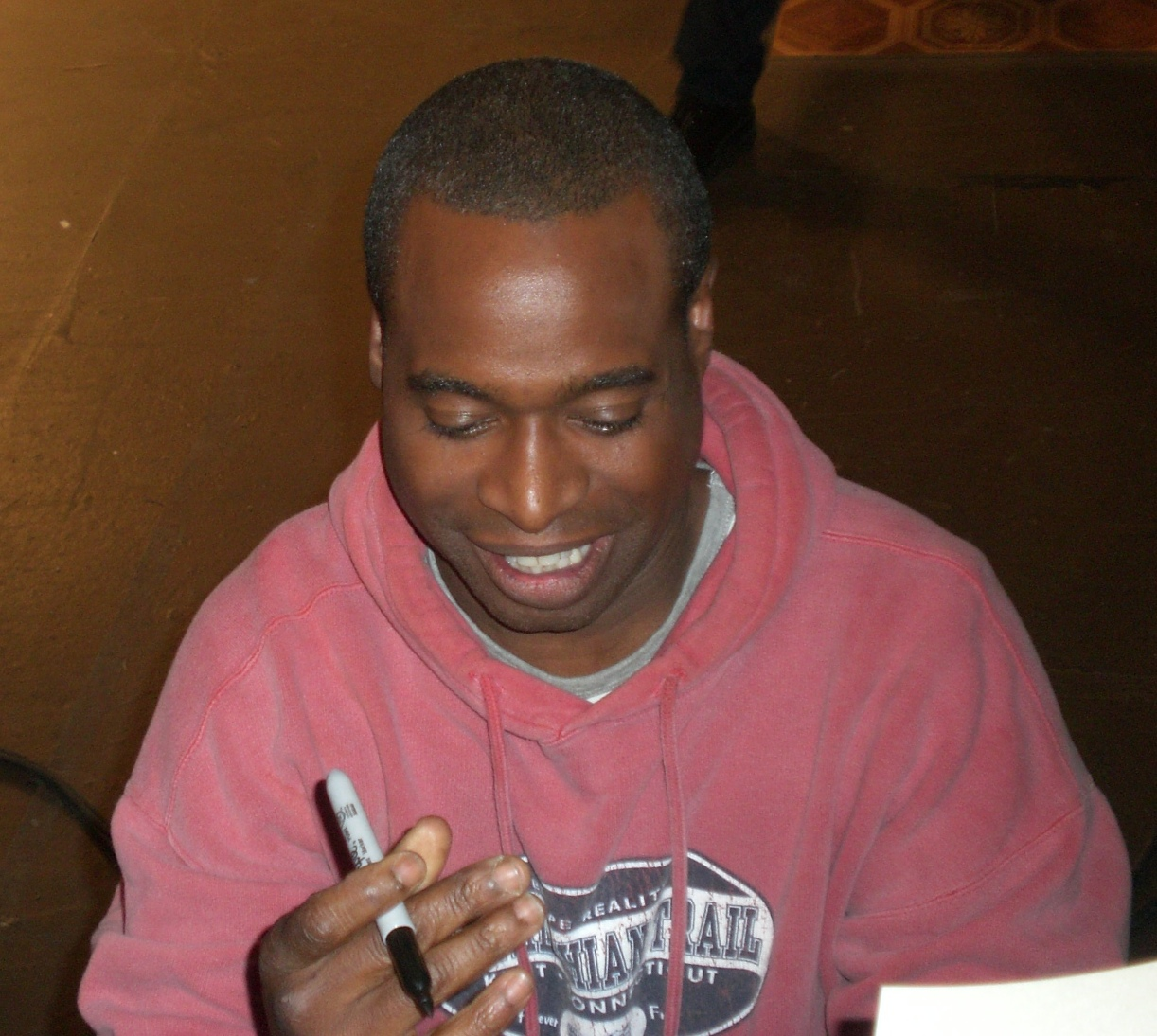
Phill Lewis plays Mr. Moseby

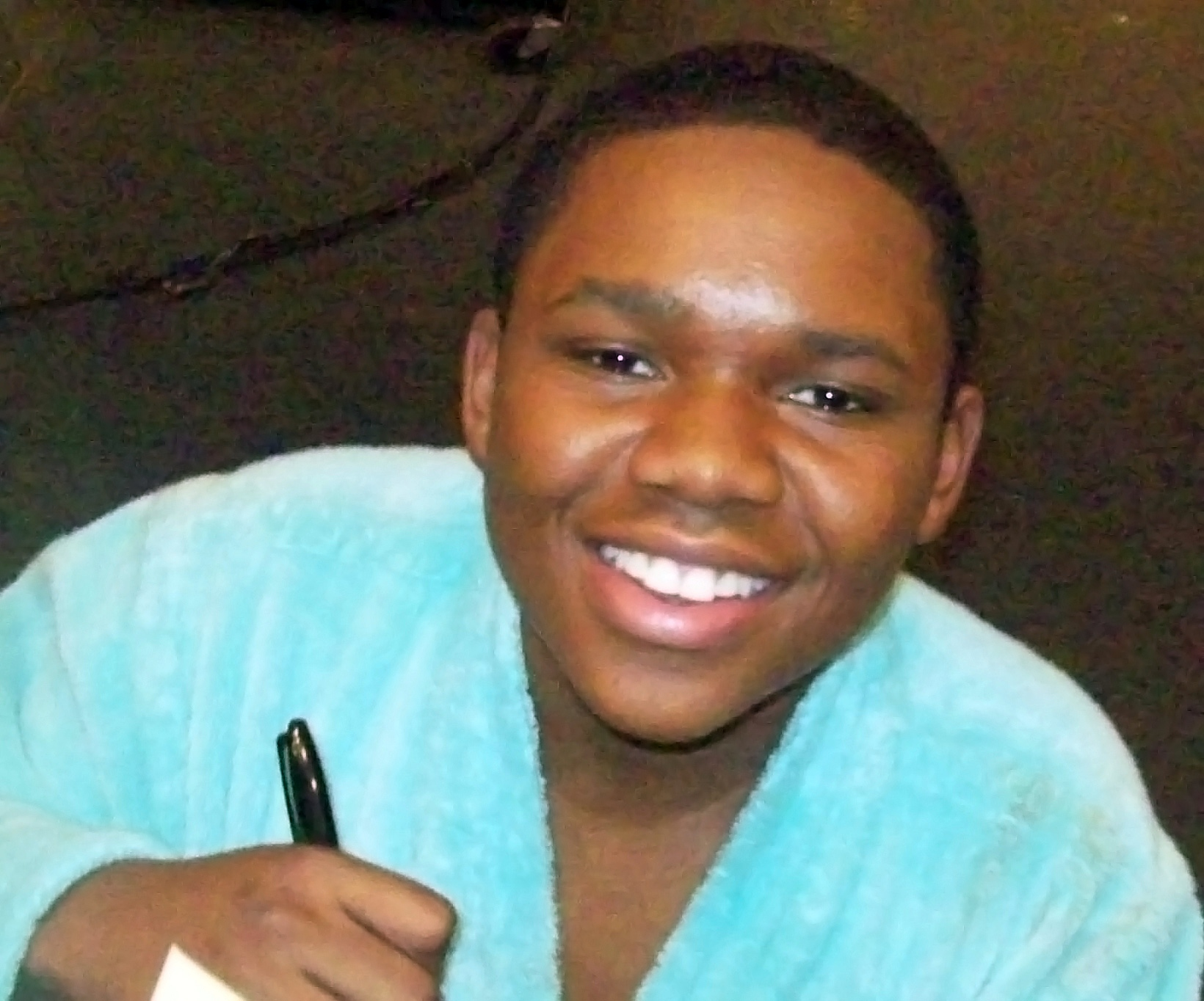
Doc Shaw plays Marcus Little

- Cole Sprouse as Cody Martin, the intelligent, kind-hearted, and sensitive twin. Cody performs well academically, is a straight A student, and has shown to have a great interest in academics; however, he does not perform well in sports. Cody has been noted to be ten minutes younger than Zack and often plays into Zack's crazy schemes. Cody is usually picked on by Zack, but Zack becomes very defensive when other people do it. Likewise, Cody cares very deeply for Zack, despite his picking on him constantly. At the end of season one, Cody begins dating Bailey Pickett, but they sever their romantic relationship in the second-season finale due to a misunderstanding in Paris. However, near the end of the third season, they get back together again after confessing that they never stopped loving each other. In "Das Boots", it is revealed that he has multiple allergies. Also, in "A London Carol", a future version of Cody and Bailey are married, though it's not certain if it was their real future.
- Dylan Sprouse as Zack Martin, the fun-loving, rebellious, and immature twin. He works in the juice bar on the ship as a result of using up both Cody's and his money for the semester. Cody is forced to obtain the job as a towel boy. Zack does not perform particularly well academically, but he manages to graduate in the series' finale episode. He performs very well physically and enjoys physical sports, especially basketball and football. Zack acts selfish at times but he also sincerely cares for his brother and friends, even if he does not always show it. He flirts with most of the girls on the ship by using various pick-up lines, although he rarely ever stays with them for more than one episode. At the beginning of the third season, he starts to develop strong feelings for a new student on the ship named Maya. At first, she refuses to go out with him since he was a "player," but eventually he wins her over by throwing a surprise party for her. He then surprises his friends by being a good boyfriend. Although initially there is confusion as to whether he loved her or whether he was just taking her on as a challenge, he proves to have strong feelings for her in later episodes. She breaks up with him in the episode "Graduation on Deck" because of a Peace Corps assignment she accepts, but they remain close friends.
- Brenda Song as London Tipton, the socialite of the four main teenage characters. She is a parody of Paris Hilton. She is the daughter of Wilfred Tipton, a multi-billionaire and the owner of the Tipton Hotel chains, including the one in Boston and the SS Tipton. London is typically selfish, dim-witted, spoiled, gullible and meticulous about her appearance but she is happy and heartwarming, and she does care for her friends (even if she can't remember the difference between Zack and Cody). She also has a pomeranian pet dog named Ivana. When she is happy, she usually claps her hands and repeatedly jumps up and down while saying her catchphrase, "Yay me!" Mr. Moseby fools London into thinking that she is on the SS Tipton for a vacation, to trick her into boarding the ship. London gets enrolled at the Seven Seas High School program because her father wants her to live in the real world. London does not live in a first class suite on the SS Tipton, but a small cabin. London reluctantly agrees to accept Bailey Pickett (Debby Ryan) as her new roommate, although she does so after unsuccessfully trying to bribe Bailey into leaving as she did with her previous roommate. The two later become good friends. In The Suite Life of Zack & Cody, when London resided at the Tipton Hotel, it seemed that she was living in her own bubble. On the SS Tipton, London became more aware of the real world and faced several difficulties to help her when she takes over her father's business.
- Debby Ryan as Bailey Pickett, a teen girl from the fictional town of Kettlecorn, Kansas. She is very intelligent just like Cody, seemingly the perfect girl-next-door and has been described as a "small town, down-to-earth girl." She shares a room with the wealthy London Tipton, in which the two later form a close friendship and end up becoming best friends. Bailey is a student at Seven Seas High and attends classes with her new friends Zack, Cody, London, and Woody. She boarded the ship to leave Kettlecorn, where she lived on a farm, because she longed for the big city. She pretends to be a boy in the pilot in order to get a room on the SS Tipton because the girls' cabins were filled. Eventually, she moves in with London after people find out she is a girl. London tries to bribe her not to move in, but Bailey refuses. Both Zack and Cody have a crush on her at the beginning of the series, but when they find out more about Bailey's life and her ex-boyfriend, Zack lets Cody have her, claiming that she was "carrying too much baggage." However, a couple seasons later he says that he doesn't blame Cody for not being able to get over Bailey and called her "smokin'," showing he still thinks she's beautiful even if he doesn't like her "that way". Cody tries several times throughout the first season to attract Bailey, but is unsuccessful until the crossover episode "Wizards on Deck with Hannah Montana" in which they start dating. They eventually end their romantic relationship in the second-season finale due to a misunderstanding in Paris. However, near the end of the third season, they get back together again after confessing that they still loved each other. In "A London Carol", a future version of Cody and Bailey are married, though it's not certain if it was their real future. In the series finale, she reveals that she chose to attend Yale University.
- Phill Lewis as Marion Moseby, the uptight and serious former manager of the Tipton Hotel in The Suite Life of Zack & Cody is now the chaperon and manager of the SS Tipton. He speaks with a wide vocabulary and an urbane vernacular, minimal tolerance for fun of any kind, and is therefore often annoyed by Zack and Cody's schemes. He has raised London Tipton like his own daughter. His repeated catch phrases, "Good luck with that," and "If you'll excuse me," have become his trademark. He often refers to the children as "Hooligans," yet in many episodes he seems to have a soft side. He loves bad jokes, has a passion for collecting handkerchiefs, and has a penchant for ballet, which becomes a running joke throughout the series. Though he acts as though he does not care about Zack and Cody, he actually has a great deal of affection for them and tells them he will miss them in the end of the Graduation on Deck episode. He's constantly running from stem to stern keeping the Martin twins and London out of trouble. Moseby is a father figure in London's life, because of London's father's absence in the series. He looks after her constantly and cares for her very deeply. Moseby reportedly tricked London in order for her to be enrolled in the Seven Seas High School program. He told London she was going on a vacation on the SS Tipton to get her on the ship. Mr. Moseby is continuously trying to "court" Ms. Tutweiller and, in the final episode of the series, proposes to her, deciding he wants them to be together rather than apart. In an act of true bravery in the final episode, Moseby tells off Mr. Tipton for having the ship dismantled during graduation; he follows up by telling the shocked crowd that he was already losing his job anyway.
- Doc Shaw as Marcus Little (seasons 2–3), a former singing sensation, Lil' Little, who comes aboard the SS Tipton. After hitting puberty, causing his voice to change, he lost his fame and career. He attends Seven Seas High and shares a room with Zack. Marcus lived in Atlanta, Georgia, as mentioned on his sash in "The Beauty and the Fleeced." He first appears in the second-season episode "Roomies". He has a crush on London, and is shown to be quite gullible, often believing Woody's tall tales. Marcus has as many famous contacts as London does; however, he is sensitive about the loss of his fame because he believes his celebrity friends won't like him, though he was later proven wrong in the episode "Crossing Jordin." Marcus eventually leaves the ship in the episode "Bon Voyage" after choosing to star in a musical based on his hit song "Retainer Baby." Cody is proud of him for this because he'll be entertaining people while promoting proper dental care.

=== Recurring ===
Actor	Character	Seasons
Matthew Timmons	Woody Fink	1–3
Erin Cardillo	Emma Tutweiller	1–3
Windell Middlebrooks	Kirby Morris	1–3
Rachael Kathryn Bell	Addison	1–3
Zoey Deutch	Maya Bennett	3

=== Special guest appearances ===
- Kim Rhodes: Carey Martin (1: "The Suite Life Sets Sail", 1: "Mom and Dad on Deck", 3: "Trouble in Tokyo", 3: "Graduation on Deck")
- Ashley Tisdale: Maddie Fitzpatrick (1: "Maddie on Deck")
- Miley Cyrus: Miley Stewart/Hannah Montana (1: "Double-Crossed")
- Emily Osment: Lilly Truscott/Lola Luftnagle (1: "Double-Crossed")
- Selena Gomez: Alex Russo (1: "Double-Crossed")
- David Henrie: Justin Russo (1: "Double-Crossed")
- Jake T. Austin: Max Russo (1: "Double-Crossed")
- Jordin Sparks: Herself (2: "Crossing Jordin")
- Kathie Lee Gifford: Cindy (2: "Model Behavior")
- George Takei: Rome Tipton (2: "Starship Tipton")
- Sean Kingston: Himself (3: "Party On!")
- Dwight Howard: Dwight Moseby Howard (3: "Twister, Part 1")
- Deron Williams: Himself (3: "Twister, Part 1")
- Kevin Love: Himself (3: "Twister, Part 1")
- Hutch Dano: Moose (1: "Mulch Ado About Nothing", 3: "Twister, Part 2")
- John Michael Higgins: Wilfred Tipton (3: "Twister, Part 3")
- Jennifer Tisdale: Connie Fitzpatrick (1: "Flowers and Chocolate", 1:"Cruisin For A Bruisin")
- Cody Kennedy as Mischa (3: "Das Boots")

=== Notable guest appearances ===
- Brian Stepanek: Arwin Hawkhauser/Milos Hawkakapolis (1: "It's All Greek To Me", 3: "Computer Date", 3: "Graduation on Deck")
- Brittany Curran: Chelsea Brimmer (1: "Flowers and Chocolate")
- Sophie Oda: Barbara Brownstein (1: "Flowers and Chocolate")
- Charlie Stewart: Bob (1: "Flowers and Chocolate")
- Jennifer Tisdale: Connie the Activities Coordinator (1: "Flowers and Chocolate", 1: "Cruisin' for a Bruisin")
- Jacopo Sarno: Luca (1: "When in Rome...")
- Robert Torti: Kurt Martin (1: "Mom and Dad on Deck", 3: "Graduation on Deck")
- Justin Kredible: Armando the Magician (2: "Ala-ka-scram!")
- Elizabeth Sung: Khun Yai (2: "Family Thais")
- Ed Begley Jr.: Mayor Ragnar (2: "The Swede Life")
- Charo: Señora Ramírez (2: "Mother of the Groom")
- Kurt Warner: Himself (2: "Any Given Fantasy")
- Charles Shaughnessy: Constable (2: "Rollin' With the Holmies")
- Camilla and Rebecca Rosso: Jessica and Janice (2: "Model Behavior")
- Matthew Willig: The Genie (2: "Rock the Kasbah")
- Andy Richter: Brother Theodore (3: "The Silent Treatment")
- Lisa K. Wyatt: Frankie (3: "Bon Voyage", "Graduation on Deck;")
- Fabio Lanzoni: Captain Hawk (3: "Senior Ditch Day")
- Brian Posehn: Dr. Cork (3: "Frozen")
- Dwight Howard: Himself (3: "Twister, Part 1")
- Deron Williams: Himself (3: "Twister, Part 1'")
- Kevin Love: Himself (3: "Twister, Part 1'")
- Michael Ralph: Sergeant Pepper (3: "Twister: Part 3")

== Production ==
=== Development ===
On February 4, 2008, it was announced that the Disney Channel was developing a new contemporary sequel to the Disney channel sitcom The Suite Life of Zack & Cody. The announcement was made by Gary Marsh, the President of the Disney Channel. He stated, "Our audience has shown us that after 88 episodes, The Suite Life of Zack & Cody remains one of their favorite sitcoms ever, we decided to find a new way for Zack, Cody, London, and Mr. Moseby to live 'The Suite Life' in a whole new setting – this time aboard a luxury cruise liner." The series original creator, Danny Kallis was announced to be involved with the project. The elements from the original series remain the same though the setting is completely different.

In December 2008, it was reported that the Disney Channel had renewed the series for a thirteen episode second season. On May 11, 2009, Disney issued a press release stating that the second season had been extended to include a larger number of episodes than the original thirteen. Gary Marsh, the president of Disney Channels Worldwide said: "With this second-season extension, the cast of 'The Suite Life' makes Disney Channel history by becoming the longest running continuous characters on our air – 138 half-hour episodes. We are thrilled for them, and for the brilliant, inspired production team that made this extraordinary run possible."

As of 2024, The Suite Life series still holds the record (162 episodes) for having the longest running characters on air in a Disney Channel franchise produced without interruption. However, the That's So Raven/Raven's Home franchise (222 episodes) and the Boy Meets World/Girl Meets World franchise (230 episodes) have since supplanted it in the overall total by being relaunched years after being taken off of the air with certain characters that were consistently on both shows.

=== Settings ===
According to show creators and producers, the choice of setting was made to appeal to an international audience with different ports-of-call, such as India, Greece, Italy, Morocco, the United Kingdom and Thailand. An on-board theater serves as an "organic" set-up for musical numbers. Most of the action in the series occurs on board the SS Tipton. However, the ship travels to a variety of places around the world, which are often unfamiliar places to both Zack and Cody Martin.

==== SS Tipton ====
The SS Tipton is a cruise ship belonging to London Tipton's father. The ship had its first canon appearance in The Suite Life of Zack & Cody episode "Let Us Entertain You". Unlike most cruise ships it also includes a study-abroad school, Seven Seas High School, which is a common setting on the ship, as are the Sky Deck, the lobby, the corridors outside the students' cabins and the cabins themselves. In the third season, the Aqua Lounge, a newly refurbished space on the ship, was shown, and it replaced the Sky Deck as the main hangout (although the Sky Deck is still commonly shown). There are also various areas on the SS Tipton that are mentioned, but never seen, including several decks and the ship's putt-putt golf course, where the captain spends most of his time. In the crossover episode of Wizards of Waverly Place, "Cast-Away (To Another Show)," Mr. Moseby reveals that the ship itself weighs 87,000 tons. After the events in "Graduation on Deck" the SS Tipton was sold and later dismantled. Moseby mentioned in the season 1 episode "Cruisin' for a Bruisin'", that the ship was not the first ship with the SS Tipton name (indicating that the Tipton cruiseline had been in service long before the events of the first series). Mr. Tipton commissioned a scale model "replica-in-a-bottle" of the first SS Tipton as a gift for Captain Lunsford.

==== Other settings ====
- Australia mentioned in the season two episode "The Defiant Ones"
- Antarctica in the season three episode "Frozen"
- Belgium in the season three episode "Party On!"
- Galapagos Islands in the season one episode "Sea Monster Mash"
- Greece in the season one episode "It's All Greek to Me"
- India in the season one episode "The Mommy and the Swami"
- The International Dateline in "International Dateline"
- Kettlecorn, Kansas – A fictional location in the season three episodes "Twister: Part 1", "Twister: Part 2", and "Twister: Part 3"
- Lichtenstamp – A parody of Liechtenstein in the season one episode "Maddie on Deck"
- London in the season two episode "Rollin' With the Holmies"
- Monte Carlo in the season three episode "The Silent Treatment"
- Morocco in the season two episode "Rock the Kasbah"
- New Orleans in the season three episode "The Ghost and Mr. Martin"
- New York City – in the series finale "Graduation on Deck"
- Paris – in the season two episode "Breakup in Paris"
- Parrot Island – A fictional location in the season one episode "Parrot Island"
- Rome in the season one episode "When In Rome..."
- South America in the season two episode "Can You Dig It?" and season three episode "Senior Ditch Day"
- Sweden in the season two episode "The Swede Life"
- Thailand in the season two episode "Family Thais"
- Tokyo in the season three episode "Trouble in Tokyo"
- Unnamed Pacific Ocean island in the season two episode "Lost at Sea"

=== Theme song and opening sequence ===
The show's theme song, "Livin' the Suite Life," was written by John Adair and Steve Hampton (who also wrote the themes for fellow Disney Channel series The Suite Life of Zack & Cody, Phil of the Future, and Wizards of Waverly Place, as well as the theme for the ABC Kids series Power Rangers: RPM), with music composed by Gary Scott (who also composed the music cues to signal scene changes and promo breaks, some of which are styled similarly to the theme), and is performed by British singer Steve Rushton (who is only credited for performing the theme in the second season).

== Episodes ==
Season	Episodes	Originally released	
Season	Episodes	First released	Last released
1	21	September 26, 2008	July 17, 2009
2	28	August 7, 2009	June 18, 2010
3	22	July 2, 2010	May 6, 2011
Film		March 25, 2011	

Note: The show's first ever air date was in the United Kingdom on September 19, 2008.

=== Wizards of Waverly Place and Hannah Montana ===
The episode "Double-Crossed" is the second part of a three-way crossover that begins on Wizards of Waverly Place and concludes on Hannah Montana. Cody promises to get tickets for himself and Bailey to a concert in Hawaii featuring Hannah Montana, who has boarded the SS Tipton. In the meantime, the Russo siblings enjoy a cruise of their own until Alex pulls a prank that causes Justin to turn blue.

== Film ==
On September 20, 2010, Disney Channel announced that production had begun for a Disney Channel Original Movie based on The Suite Life of Zack & Cody and The Suite Life on Deck.

The Suite Life Movie premiered on the Disney Channel in the United States and Canada on March 25, 2011.

== Cancelled revival ==
In 2013, during an interview with Gawker, Dylan Sprouse revealed he and his brother had pitched an idea to the Disney Channel about continuing the Suite Life series. The show would see Zack and Cody return to the Tipton Hotel in Boston to live with their mother, and would become mentors to a boy who lived with his father at the hotel. Disney rejected the idea initially, but contacted the twins a year later with an edited concept that retained the boy and his father storyline, but Zack and Cody would move to a Miami hotel instead, Selena Gomez would also star and the twins would not get producer credits like they had requested. The Sprouses rejected the concept, leaving the project abandoned.

== Broadcast ==
The Suite Life on Deck premiered in Australia and New Zealand October 6, 2008. It is broadcast on Disney Channel and on NZ MediaWorks TV3 and FOUR.

== Merchandise ==
=== DVD releases ===
DVD title	Release dates	Discs	Episodes	Extras
Anchors Away!	August 25, 2009	1	"The Suite Life Sets Sail", "Parrot Island", "Kidney of the Sea", "International Dateline", "Maddie on Deck", and "Mulch Ado About Nothing".	Debby On Deck - Debby Ryan's interview with the Sprouse twins. The Floating Premiere - Jam-packed fun at the star-studded, on-deck event.
Wizards on Deck with Hannah Montana	September 22, 2009	1	Crossover episodes from Wizards of Waverly Place, The Suite Life on Deck, and Hannah Montana.	Justin's Award-Winning Essay - Watch the essay video that got Justin and his siblings on the S.S. Tipton teen cruise. It's a Suite Life Having Fun with Hannah & the Wizards - Hilarious bloopers and backstage interviews with the stars.

=== Other media ===
An activity book based on the series was released on July 13, 2009. The book is called "The Suite Life on Deck Sink or Swim Sticker Activity Book". A photo album based on the series was also released, and it includes several posters, colored images from the series, captions and activities for the reader. In August 2009, two new books titled "Suite Life on Deck: A Day in the Life" and "Suite Life on Deck Party Planner" were released by Disney.

== Reception ==
=== U.S. Nielsen ratings ===
The show's pilot premiered on the Disney Channel in the U.S. on September 26, 2008, and gathered 5.7 million viewers on the night of its premiere. The series premiere in Canada was also the most watched series premiere on Family channel. In December 2008, Business Wire reported the show was 2008's #1 top scripted television series for children between the ages of 6 and 11 and pre-teenagers between the ages of 9 and 14, beating the veteran series Hannah Montana and Wizards of Waverly Place in the ratings. The show was in the #1 spot for the top rated children's television series for many months. The show has been one of the top 4 live-action television series for many months. Since then, "The Suite Life on Deck" held a commanding lead in the time slot (Friday 8:00 p.m.), ranking as TV's #1 program among the key children demographics, virtually doubling Nickelodeon among children between the ages of 9 and 14, and defeating it by a 6% among children between the ages of 6 and 11. In addition, the series would reach #1 in total viewers on all cable, outperforming #2 networks Fox News and Nickelodeon by 800,000 more viewers.

As of August 2009, the highest rated episode of The Suite Life on Deck was "Double-Crossed," the second part of Wizards On Deck with Hannah Montana, a trilogy of crossover episodes featuring guest stars from Wizards of Waverly Place and Hannah Montana which premiered on July 17, 2009, on Disney Channel. The special was viewed by more than 10.6 million viewers, program of the night across both cable and broadcast television, and ranks as one of the highest-rated episodes for a Disney Channel original series. This was the first episode that Cody and Bailey go out on a date.

In early October 2009, the series one-hour special episode "Lost at Sea" became the most watched episode of the series, with 7.6 million total viewers, including 3.2 million in the Kids 6–11 demographic, and 2.8 million in the Tweens 9–13 demographic. The episode delivered Disney Channel's best numbers in the hour with regular programming in the net's history. In 2009, the series was the most watched scripted series in the children and tween demographic (6–14), outpacing Hannah Montana and several other teenage shows. The series second season's ratings grew 25% higher than the show's season one ratings, the second season has averaged approximately 5.1 million viewers.

=== Season premiere ratings ===
Season	Episode	Air date (U.S.)	Ratings	Viewers (in millions)
1	The Suite Life Sets Sail	September 26, 2008	4.8	5.7
2	The Spy Who Shoved Me	August 7, 2009	4.7	5.1
3	The Silent Treatment	July 2, 2010	2.7	3.4

=== Record breaking episodes ===
No.	Episode	Air date (U.S.)	Ratings	Viewers (in millions)
1.21	Double-Crossed	July 17, 2009	8.8	10.6
2.08	Lost at Sea	October 2, 2009	3.9	7.6
3.19	Twister: Part 3	January 16, 2011	4.0	7.2

=== iTunes ===
Before the series officially made its debut on air, the first episode entitled "The Suite Life Sets Sail" was made available as a free download on iTunes. All series have since been made available.

=== Resurgence of Zack and Cody's dinner reservation episode ===
In November 2023, an episode entitled "When in Rome..." went viral over social media due to Zack and Cody's restaurant reservation date. The episode featured Zack and Cody attempting to reserve a table at an Italian restaurant, only to find out their table was reserved for 7:30p.m. on November 16, 2023.

== Accolades ==
Year	Award	Category	Recipient	Result	Ref.
2010	Green Globe Film Awards	Outstanding Actors Asians in Hollywood	Brenda Song	Nominated	
2010	2010 Kids' Choice Awards	Favorite TV Show	The Suite Life on Deck	Nominated	
2010	2010 Kids' Choice Awards	Favorite TV Actor	Cole Sprouse	Nominated	
2010	2010 Kids' Choice Awards	Favorite TV Actor	Dylan Sprouse	Won	
2010	Hollywood Teen TV Awards	Teen Pick Show: Comedy	The Suite Life on Deck	Nominated	
2011	2011 Kids' Choice Awards	Favorite TV Show	The Suite Life on Deck	Nominated	
2011	Casting Society of America	Best Casting – Children's Series	Dana Gergely; Brandi Brice	Won	
