= Instant Pleasure (song) =

Single by Rufus Wainwright
- Songwriter(s): Seth Swirsky

The song Instant Pleasure was written by pop songwriter Seth Swirsky and was featured in Adam Sandler's highest-grossing film, Big Daddy (1999). In the movie, it was sung by Rufus Wainwright. The song was recorded by Seth Swirsky on his first solo album, Instant Pleasure, in 2004. The album won Best Pop Album at the 2005 L.A. Music Awards. Rockell also recorded the song for her 2002 album, Instant Pleasure.

The song has become a cult hit on many college campuses. The Appalachian State College newspaper asked in allusion, on October 17, 2006, whether "college students have become more concerned with instant pleasure than a meaningful relationship". Drew University's student a cappella group, 36 Madison Avenue, did a version of the song at their Jamfest in 2007. Elon University's a cappella group also did a version of the song as did Colby College's a cappella group, Colby Megalomanics.
