= I Saw Mommy Kissing Santa Claus (film) =

2001 television film

- French video cover
- Based on: "I Saw Mommy Kissing Santa Claus" by Tommie Connor
- Written by: Randy Vampotic; Mike Sorrentino; Steve Jankowski; John Shepphird
- Directed by: John Shepphird
- Starring: Connie Sellecca; Corbin Bernsen; Dylan Sprouse; Cole Sprouse
- Music by: David Reynolds
- Countries of origin: United States; Germany
- Original language: English

Production
- Executive producers: Paul Colichman; Mark R. Harris; Stephen P. Jarchow
- Producers: James Rosenthal; Jeffrey Schenck; Shawn Levy; Steve Jankowski
- Cinematography: Neal Brown
- Editor: Geno Foster
- Running time: 100 minutes
- Production companies: Regent Entertainment; ACH; Medien Capital Treuhand

Original release
- Network: Pax TV
- Release: October 23, 2001

I Saw Mommy Kissing Santa Claus is a 2001 family television film, based on the classic holiday song of the same name. The movie's tagline was "Christmas is coming, and Santa's a dirty rat."

The film was directed by John Shepphird, and stars Connie Selleca, Corbin Bernsen, and Dylan and Cole Sprouse, with Sonny Carl Davis and Eric Jacobs in supporting roles. I Saw Mommy Kissing Santa Claus first aired December 9, 2001, on Pax TV, where it aired until 2007. As of 2008, it is shown in the 25 Days of Christmas programming block on Freeform.

== Plot ==
Young Justin Carver is having Thanksgiving dinner with his family, only for it to end with the news that his best friend Bobby's bickering parents are finally deciding to divorce. When he overhears his own parents, Stephanie and David Carver having a heated argument, Justin retreats to his bedroom. A few minutes later, Justin peeks downstairs, only to see his mother Stephanie locked in a warm, romantic embrace with none other than Santa Claus (his father in a Santa suit). He takes a photo, shows it to Bobby the next day, and then sends it to Mrs. Claus. Fooled by Bobby's own situation with his parents, Justin jumps to the conclusion that his mother is having an affair with Santa. So he decides to behave as badly as possible in an attempt to prevent Santa from coming to his house on Christmas Eve night for him to make off with Justin's mother.

The resulting hi-jinks include Justin setting traps and throwing snowballs at a street Santa, and even getting himself in trouble at school. Then, on Christmas Eve, Justin's mother receives a letter from the post office. Inside is the photo, which didn't get sent. In the end, Justin finds out that Santa was his father, apologizes, and gets the toy he wanted from the real Santa.

== Cast ==
- Connie Sellecca as Stephanie Carver
- Corbin Bernsen as David Carver
- Dylan and Cole Sprouse as Justin Carver
- Sonny Carl Davis as Santa/Floyd
- Eric Jacobs as Bobby Becker
- Tony Larimer as Grandpa Irwin
- David Millbern as Felix Becker
- Shauna Thompson as Marie Becker
- Joan Mullaney as Ms. Crumley
- JJ Neward as Jaine
- Paul Kiernan as Sal Jenkins
- Caitlin EJ Meyer as Mary Poindexter (as Caitlin Meyer)
- Jeff Olson as Principal Hoke
- Frank Gerrish as Sidney

== Reception ==
Andy Webb from "The Movie Scene" gave the film two out of five stars and stated: "What this all boils down to is that "I Saw Mommy Kissing Santa Claus" is a misguided movie. It's misguided because the fact it basically debunks Santa Clause means it doesn't have a target audience and those who are young enough to find the jokes funny are the ones who don't need the magic of Christmas spoilt." Justin Oberholtzer from "Freakin' Awesome Network" gave it a D+ and wrote: "It baffles me that it took four men to write this script. How hard is it to knock out such a simple premise? Maybe they were all friends and simply started exchanging ideas for the Santa chases. Those pranks are the only thought put into the film and they become redundant. They try to instill some heart into the film, but it comes off like a cheesy Hallmark card. Which is the best way to describe this film."

== See also ==
- List of Christmas films
- Santa Claus in film
