= Adventures in Appletown =

- The American DVD Box Art.
- Directed by: Robert Moresco
- Written by: Amanda Moresco
- Produced by: Robert Moresco; Amanda Moresco; Joseph A. Reilly; Alain Silver
- Starring: Dylan Sprouse; Cole Sprouse; Victoria Justice; Eileen Brennan; Malcolm David Kelley
- Cinematography: Daniel Pearl
- Edited by: Harvey Rosenstock
- Music by: Mark Snow
- Production company: Moresco Productions
- Distributed by: Naedomi Media
- Release date: December 12, 2008; (limited release)
- Language: English
- Budget: $7,000,000

Adventures in Appletown (also known as Hidden Treasure of the Mississippi or The Kings of Appletown) is a 2008 dramedy/adventure film starring twin brothers Dylan Sprouse and Cole Sprouse, written by Amanda Moresco, directed by Robert Moresco, and produced by Moresco Productions in association with Oak Films. This was the second time the brothers and Victoria Justice worked together, the first time was in an episode of The Suite Life of Zack & Cody called "Fairest of Them All" (Season 1, Episode 2).

== Production ==
It completed principal filming in New Braunfels, Texas and completed post production some time after that.

== Story ==
The film is about two cousins – Will and Clayton – who witness a murder, but out of fear decide not to tell anyone. They and their friend Betsy, whose father has been wrongfully accused of the crime, go on a journey to find the real killer, and at the same time redeem themselves.

== Early (limited) release ==
Adventures in Appletown had a limited preview release on December 12, 2008 and was returned to post production.

On April 13, 2009 the film had a special screening at Loews in Lincoln Square in New York City. The screening benefited the Joseph Horvath Memorial Scholarship Fund.

The film premiered in Australia on September 13, 2012 on Family Movie Channel on Foxtel and Austar. It released in Australia on DVD early 2013.

== Cast ==
- Dylan Sprouse as Will
- Cole Sprouse as Clayton
- Victoria Justice as Betsy
- Kate Burton as Mrs. Betta
- Charlie Stewart as Ben (Benny)
- Dalton O'Dell as Jimmy Johnson
- Glenn Taranto as Potter
- Daniel Zacapa as Judge Morgan
- Patrick Brennan as Officer Johnson
- Sierra Jade Gerban as Faith Ramos
- Malcolm David Kelley as Clifford

== Reception ==
The film received mixed reviews from critics.
