= Diary of a Sex Addict =

2001 film by Joseph Brutsman

- DVD cover
- Directed by: Joseph Brutsman
- Written by: Anthony Peck; Joseph Brutsman
- Produced by: Mark Burg; Oren Koules; Anthony Peck; Glenn S. Gainor
- Starring: Rosanna Arquette; Nastassja Kinski; Michael Des Barres; Ed Begley Jr.
- Cinematography: Nathan Hope
- Edited by: Greg Tillman
- Music by: Doug Smith
- Production companies: Evolution Entertainment; Nu Image
- Distributed by: Columbia TriStar Home Video
- Release dates: August 2001 (Venice); November 13, 2001 (United States)
- Running time: 93 minutes
- Country: United States
- Language: English

Diary of a Sex Addict is a 2001 American drama film directed by Joseph Brutsman, who co-wrote the screenplay with Anthony Peck, son of Gregory Peck. It stars Rosanna Arquette, Nastassja Kinski, Michael Des Barres, and Ed Begley Jr.

The film premiered at the 58th Venice International Film Festival in August 2001. It was released on DVD in the United States on November 13, 2001.

== Premise ==
A middle-aged chef in a luxurious restaurant reveals to his psychiatrist that while he is a family man who loves his wife and son, he is at the same time a sex addict who seeks pleasure at any time with any woman.

== Cast ==
- Rosanna Arquette as Grace
- Michael Des Barres as Sammy
- Nastassja Kinski as Dr. Jane, the therapist
- Eva Jenickova as Tatiana
- Cole Sprouse and Dylan Sprouse as Sammy Jr.
- Ed Begley Jr. as Dr. Aaron
- Alexandra Paul as Katherine, Grace's sister
- A. J. Benza as Detective Shore
- Joey House as Tawney
- Anna de Cardi as Heather
- Maria del Mar as Vita
- Heidi Jo Markel as Kelly May
- Adrienne Janic as Julie
- Troy Winbush as Ordell
- T. C. Warner as Ms. Storm
- Tangie Ambrose as "Suga"
- Simona Williams as Leslie Anderson
- Rachelle Carson-Begley as Sophie
- Daniella Rich as Marina
- Terri Apple as Sue
- Shirly Brener as Angel
- Shannan Leigh as Cathy, the prostitute
- Jimmy Flynt as Tom, the cook
- Aviva Gale as Veronica, the cook
- Nancy Linehan Charles as Sammy's mother
- M. C. Gainey as theatre manager
- Kevin Kirkpatrick as the bartender
- Shea Curry as dream girl (uncredited)
