= Cole Sprouse =

American actor (born 1992)

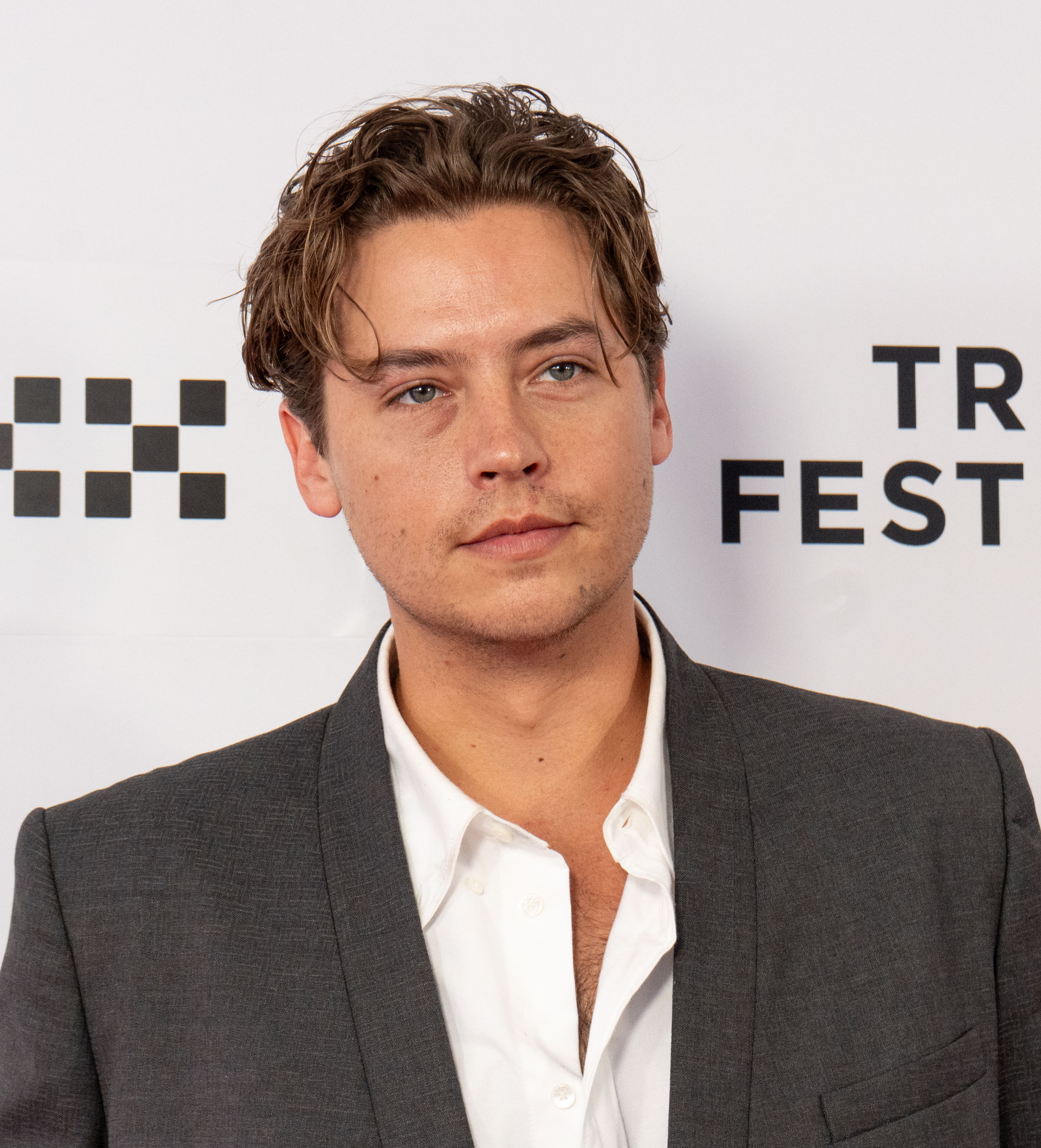
- Sprouse in 2026
- Born: Cole Mitchell Sprouse; August 4, 1992 (age 34); Arezzo, Tuscany, Italy
- Education: New York University
- Occupation: Actor
- Years active: 1993–2012; 2017–present
- Relatives: Dylan Sprouse (twin brother)

Cole Mitchell Sprouse (born August 4, 1992) is an American actor. He is known for his role as Cody Martin on the Disney Channel series The Suite Life of Zack & Cody (2005–2008), and its spin-off series The Suite Life on Deck (2008–2011), and his role as Jughead Jones on The CW television series Riverdale (2017–2023). In his early career, Sprouse appeared in various projects with his twin brother Dylan Sprouse, including The Suite Life and Big Daddy (1999).

== Early life ==
Cole Mitchell Sprouse was born in Arezzo, Italy, to American parents Matthew Sprouse and Melanie Wright. He was born 15 minutes after his twin brother Dylan Sprouse and was named after jazz singer and pianist Nat King Cole. When the twins were four months old, the family moved back to their parents' native Long Beach, California.

In college, Sprouse majored in Geographic Information Systems in archaeology. He was inspired by his grandfather, a geologist, and also by his interest in earth science.

== Career ==
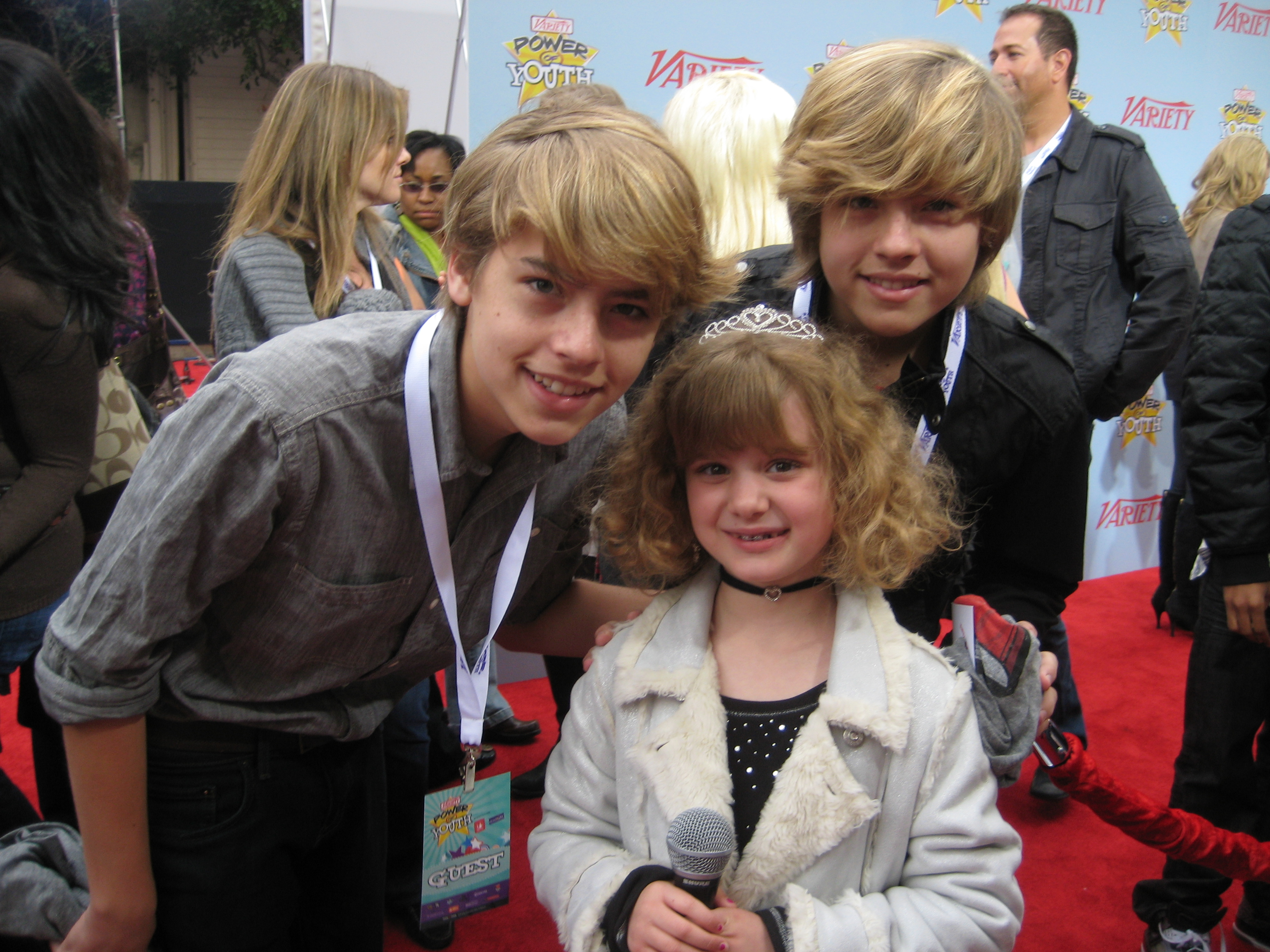
Cole (left) and his brother Dylan (right), with Piper Reese at the 2009 Power of Youth event

=== 1993–2012: Early roles as child actor ===
Cole and his brother, Dylan, began acting at the age of eight months following a suggestion from their grandmother, Jonine Booth Wright, who was a drama teacher and actress. Much of Sprouse's early career was shared with his brother—some of their earliest roles were shared roles as one baby or child in commercials, television shows, and films. Due to child labor laws in California restricting the amount of time children can be filmed in a day, casting twins in a single role allows more time for one character to be filmed.

Some notable roles he shared with his brother include the characters of Patrick Kelly in the sitcom Grace Under Fire from 1993 to 1998, Julian in the 1999 film, Big Daddy, and young Pistachio Disguisey in 2002's The Master of Disguise. In 2001, Cole began appearing in episodes of NBC's television sitcom Friends, as Ross Geller's son, Ben; this role was his first role in which he did not appear with his brother. As he and his brother grew older, they began taking on more roles as separate characters but often still worked on the same projects. Their first role as separate characters in the same production was as kids in a MADtv sketch. Sprouse portrayed Cody Martin in the 2005 Disney Channel original series, The Suite Life of Zack & Cody alongside his brother; he reprised the role in the show's 2008 spinoff, The Suite Life on Deck and its related film.

=== 2016–present: Post-university return to acting ===
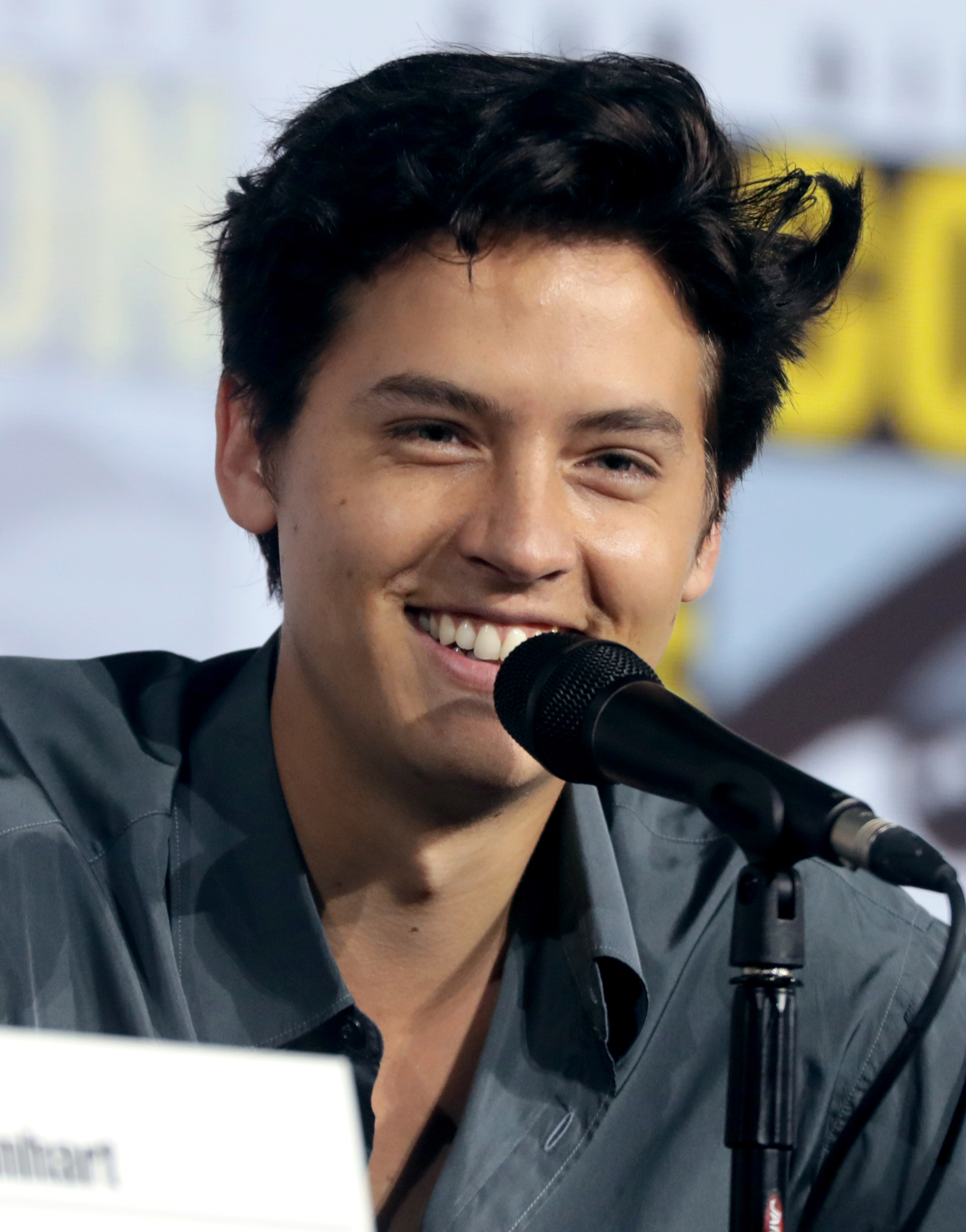
Sprouse in 2019

On February 9, 2016, Sprouse was cast as Jughead Jones in The CW's teen drama series Riverdale, based on the characters of Archie Comics. The series premiered on January 26, 2017. In 2019, Sprouse starred in Five Feet Apart, a romantic drama which was released in March; he plays a cystic fibrosis patient who falls in love with a girl with the same disease. It was his second lead role in a major theatrical film, 20 years after his first, Big Daddy. Sprouse produced and starred in the eight-episode podcast Borrasca in 2020. The series received a seven-episode second season that was published from September to November 2022. In 2021, he was cast in Moonshot alongside Lana Condor.

== Personal life ==
Sprouse is a fan of comics and worked at the Los Angeles comic store Meltdown.

Sprouse has opened up about the dysfunctional relationship he and his brother have with their mother, claiming that the justice system had to intervene in their adolescence and give their father full custody due to her lacking the mental stability to be a parent. He has said that the entertainment industry appealed to his mother's drug addiction and narcissistic behavior, and "in very many ways encourages the worst qualities of you as a person ... It's one of those things that encouraged a kind of selfishness directly opposed to the very fundamental idea of motherhood."

Sprouse began attending New York University in 2011, after deferring one year. Initially interested in studying film and television production, he decided to enroll instead in the Gallatin School of Individualized Study, pursuing the humanities and in particular archaeology. He graduated alongside his brother in May 2015. Sprouse worked briefly in the field of archaeology, participating in excavations and performing lab work. He specialized in geographical information systems and satellite imaging. During his studies he performed summer digs in both Europe and Asia. While engaged in his undergraduate work, he unearthed a mask of Dionysus on a dig in Bulgaria.

Sprouse has an avid interest in photography. In 2011, he launched a personal photography website and took classes at NYU. He has shot assignments for major fashion publications including Teen Vogue, L'Uomo Vogue, The Sunday Times Style, and W Magazine, among others. Sprouse was in a relationship with his Riverdale co-star Lili Reinhart from 2018 to March 2020. On May 31, 2020, Sprouse was arrested after he joined the protests in Los Angeles for racial justice after the murder of George Floyd.

== Filmography ==
=== Film ===
Key
†	Denotes films that have not yet been released

Year	Title	Role	Notes	Ref.
1999	Big Daddy	Julian McGrath		
1999	The Astronaut's Wife	Twin		
2001	Diary of a Sex Addict	Sammy Jr.	Direct-to-video film	
2001	I Saw Mommy Kissing Santa Claus	Justin Carver		
2002	The Master of Disguise	Young Pistachio Disguisey		
2002	Eight Crazy Nights	KB Toys soldier	Voice	
2003	Apple Jack	Jack Pyne	Short film	
2003	Just for Kicks	Cole Martin	Direct-to-video film	
2004	The Heart Is Deceitful Above All Things	Older Jeremiah		
2006	Holidaze: The Christmas That Almost Didn't Happen	Kid	Voice; direct-to-video film	
2007	A Modern Twain Story: The Prince and the Pauper	Eddie Tudor		
2008	The Kings of Appletown	Clayton		
2010	Kung Fu Magoo	Brad Landry	Direct-to-video film	
2019	Five Feet Apart	Will Newman		
2022	Moonshot	Walt		
2024	Lisa Frankenstein	The Creature		
2024	I Wish You All the Best	Thomas		
2025	The Rivals of Amziah King	Oat		
2026	The Long Haul	Alex		
2026	Vintage Violence	Carter Tipe		
2027	Goodbye Girl †		Post-production	
TBA	Elastic Hearts †	Oliver	Post-production	
TBA	Wake †		Post-production	
TBA	Hot Year †		Post-production	

=== Television ===
Year	Title	Role	Notes	Ref(s)
1993–1998	Grace Under Fire	Patrick Kelly	Main role	
1998	Mad TV	Kid	2 episodes	
2000–2002	Friends	Ben Geller	Recurring role	
2001	The Nightmare Room	Buddy	Episode: "Scareful What You Wish For"	
2001	That '70s Show	Billy	Episode: "Eric's Depression"	
2005–2008	The Suite Life of Zack & Cody	Cody Martin	Main role	
2006	The Emperor's New School	Zim	Voice; episode: "Oops, All Doodles/Chipmunky Business"	
2006	That's So Raven	Cody Martin	Episode: "Checkin' Out"	
2008	According to Jim	Himself	Episode: "I Drink Your Milkshake"	
2008–2011	The Suite Life on Deck	Cody Martin	Main role	
2009	Wizards of Waverly Place	Cody Martin	Episode: "Cast-Away (To Another Show)"	
2009	Hannah Montana	Cody Martin	Episode: "Super(stitious) Girl"	
2010	I'm in the Band	Cody Martin	Episode: "Weasels on Deck"	
2011	The Suite Life Movie	Cody Martin	Television film; Sprouse also, alongside his brother, served as an executive producer	
2012	So Random!	Himself	Episode: "Cole and Dylan Sprouse"	
2017–2023	Riverdale	Forsythe "Jughead" Jones III	Additionally portrayed teen Forsythe Pendleton in 2 episodes and Jack in 1 episode	

=== Podcast ===
Year	Title	Role	Notes	Ref(s)
2020	Borrasca	Sam Walker		

== Awards and nominations ==
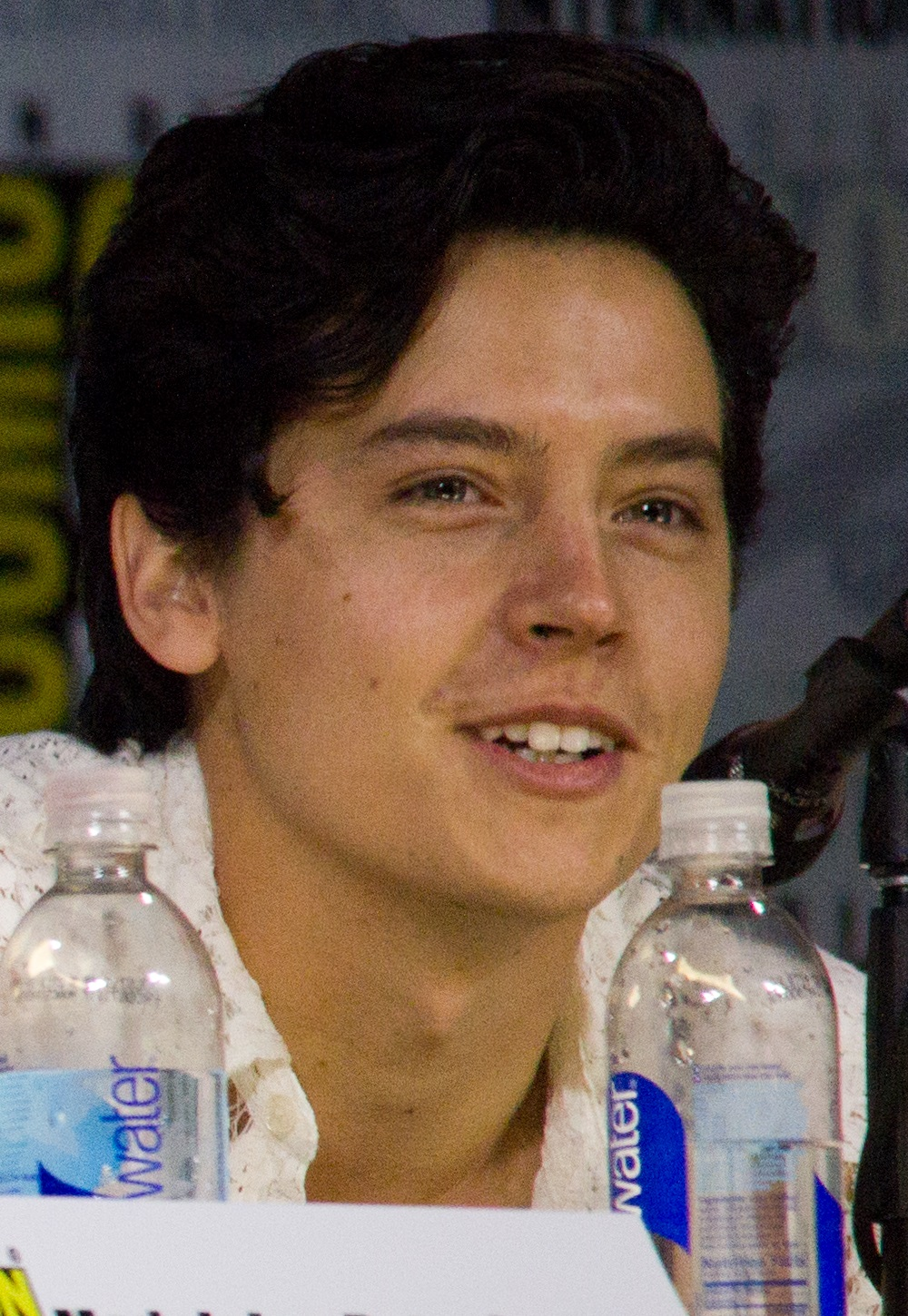
Sprouse at the 2017 San Diego Comic-Con

Among his several accolades, Sprouse is a 13-time nominee and eight-time winner of the Teen Choice Award. As a child actor, he received three Young Artist Award nominations for his roles in Big Daddy and The Suite Life of Zack & Cody.

Year	Award	Category	Nominated work	Result	Ref.
1999	YoungStar Awards	Best Performance by a Young Actor in a Comedy Film	Big Daddy	Nominated	
2000	Blockbuster Entertainment Awards	Favorite Supporting Actor – Comedy (with Dylan Sprouse)	Big Daddy	Nominated	
2000	MTV Movie Awards	Best On-Screen Duo (with Dylan Sprouse and Adam Sandler)	Big Daddy	Nominated	
2000	Young Artist Awards	Best Performance in a Feature Film – Young Actor Age Ten or Under	Big Daddy	Nominated	
2006	Young Artist Awards	Best Performance in a TV Series (Comedy or Drama) – Leading Young Actor	The Suite Life of Zack & Cody	Nominated	
2007	Kids' Choice Awards	Favorite Television Actor	The Suite Life of Zack & Cody	Nominated	
2007	Young Artist Awards	Best Performance in a TV Series (Comedy or Drama) – Leading Young Actor	The Suite Life of Zack & Cody	Nominated	
2008	Kids' Choice Awards	Favorite Television Actor	The Suite Life of Zack & Cody	Nominated	
2009	Kids' Choice Awards	Favorite Television Actor	The Suite Life of Zack & Cody	Nominated	
2010	Kids' Choice Awards	Favorite Television Actor	The Suite Life on Deck	Nominated	
2011	Kids' Choice Awards	Favorite Television Actor	The Suite Life on Deck	Nominated	
2017	Shorty Awards	Best Actor	–	Nominated	
2017	Teen Choice Awards	Choice Drama TV Actor	Riverdale	Won	
2017	Teen Choice Awards	Choice TV Ship (with Lili Reinhart)	Riverdale	Won	
2018	People's Choice Awards	Male TV Star of the Year	Riverdale	Nominated	
2018	Saturn Awards	Best Performance by a Younger Actor in a Television Series	Riverdale	Nominated	
2018	Teen Choice Awards	Choice Drama TV Actor	Riverdale	Won	
2018	Teen Choice Awards	Choice Liplock (with Lili Reinhart)	Riverdale	Won	
2018	Teen Choice Awards	Choice Male Hottie	–	Won	
2018	Teen Choice Awards	Choice TV Ship (with Lili Reinhart)	Riverdale	Won	
2019	People's Choice Awards	Drama Movie Star of the Year	Five Feet Apart	Won	
2019	People's Choice Awards	Male TV Star of the Year	Riverdale	Won	
2019	Saturn Awards	Best Performance by a Younger Actor in a Television Series	Riverdale	Nominated	
2019	Teen Choice Awards	Choice Drama Movie Actor	Five Feet Apart	Nominated	
2019	Teen Choice Awards	Choice Drama TV Actor	Riverdale	Won	
2019	Teen Choice Awards	Choice Ship (with Lili Reinhart)	Riverdale	Won	
2020	People's Choice Awards	Drama TV Star of the Year	Riverdale	Nominated	
2020	People's Choice Awards	Male TV Star of the Year	Riverdale	Won	

== Discography ==
- "A Dream Is a Wish Your Heart Makes", Disneymania 4, 2005
- "A Dream Is a Wish Your Heart Makes", Princess Disneymania, 2008
