= Brenda Song =

American actress (born 1988)

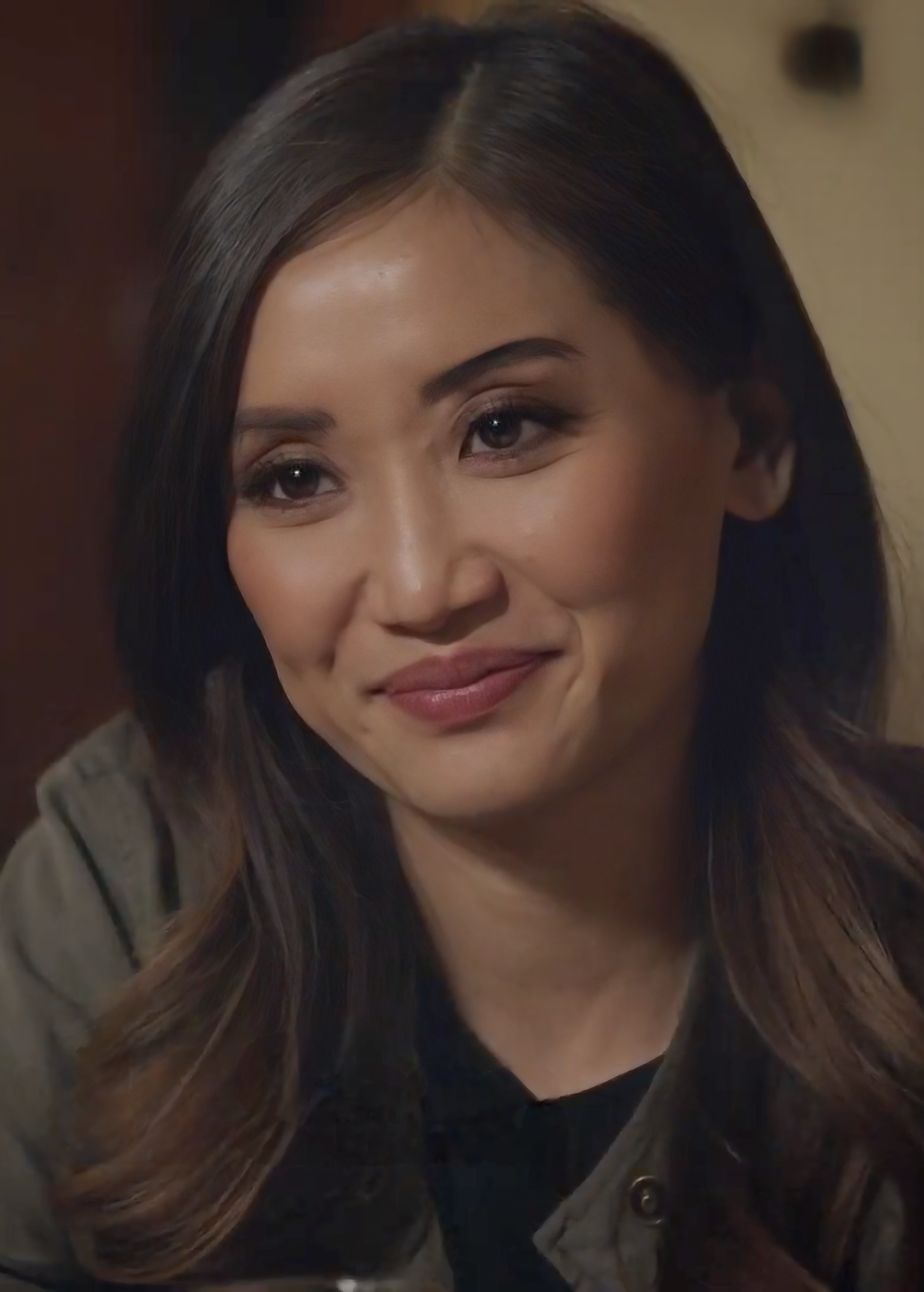
- Song in 2022
- Born: March 27, 1988 (age 38); Carmichael, California, U.S.
- Education: University of California, Berkeley (BA)
- Years active: 1993–present
- Partner: Macaulay Culkin (2017–present)
- Children: 2

Brenda Song (born March 27, 1988) is an American actress. She began her career at the age of six, working as a child model, and made her screen debut with a guest appearance on the sitcom Thunder Alley (1995), and went on to roles such as the children's television series Fudge (1995) and the Nickelodeon series 100 Deeds for Eddie McDowd (1999). She starred in the Disney Channel original film The Ultimate Christmas Present (2000), which won her a Young Artist Award. She subsequently signed a contract with Disney Channel and earned widespread recognition for playing the titular character in the action film Wendy Wu: Homecoming Warrior (2006), and London Tipton in The Suite Life franchise (2005–2011), earning her acclaim and two Young Hollywood Awards. She additionally played the recurring role of Tia in Phil of the Future (2004–2005), and had starring roles in the television film Get a Clue (2002), the sports comedy film Like Mike (2002) and the comedy film Stuck in the Suburbs (2004).

Song made her transition into mainstream roles with the critically acclaimed biographical drama film The Social Network (2010) and went on to roles in the ABC political thriller Scandal (2012–2013), the Fox sitcom New Girl and the sitcom Dads (2013). In October 2014, she signed a talent holding deal with Fox and 20th Century Fox Television and was subsequently cast in several television pilots for NBC and CBS, including the medical drama series Pure Genius (2016–2017) and the action drama series Station 19 (2018–2020). She returned to Disney Channel to provide the voice of Anne Boonchuy in the animated series Amphibia (2019–2022), starred as Madison Maxwell in the Hulu comedy-drama series Dollface (2019–2022), and provides the voice of Princess Akemi in Blue Eye Samurai (2023–present). She also appeared in the romantic comedy Angry Angel (2017), the psychological thriller Secret Obsession (2019), the comedy-drama Changeland (2019), the romantic comedy Love Accidentally and the horror video-game The Quarry (both 2022).

Song earned renewed recognition for starring as a showgirl in the drama film The Last Showgirl (2024) and a chief of staff in the Netflix series Running Point (2025–present).

== Early life ==
Song was born on March 27, 1988, in Carmichael, California, a suburb of Sacramento. Her father is Hmong and from Bangkok. Her mother is also from Thailand, and was adopted by a Hmong family. Her paternal grandparents were from the Xiong clan (熊; Xyooj in Hmong), but anglicized their surname to Song after arriving in the United States. Her parents were born in Thailand and met as adults in Sacramento. Her father works as a school teacher and her mother is a homemaker. She has two younger brothers named Timmy and Nathan Song.

When she was six years old, Song moved with her mother to Los Angeles to support her acting career; the rest of the family followed two years later. As a young girl, Song wanted to do ballet, while her younger brother wanted to take taekwondo. She said, "My mom only wanted to take us to one place," so they settled on taekwondo. Although Song cried all the way through her first class, she now holds a black belt in taekwondo. Song was named an All-American Scholar in the ninth grade. She was homeschooled and earned a high school diploma at age 16, then took courses at a community college. She graduated from the University of California, Berkeley in 2009, majoring in psychology and minoring in business.

== Career ==
=== 1990s: Beginnings ===
Song began in show business as a child fashion model in San Francisco after being spotted in a shopping mall by an agent from a modeling school. She began acting at the age of five or six in a Little Caesars commercial, and then a Barbie commercial. Her first film role was in the 1995 Requiem, an AFI student short film by actress Elizabeth Sung. "She came in confident [at the auditions]. She was very focused, and it was very obvious that she loved what she was doing," said Sung. The film is about a waitress/dancer named Fong who remembers her loving brother and their bittersweet childhood in Hong Kong. The seven-year-old Song played a young version of "Fong", who is portrayed as an adult by Tamlyn Tomita. The film won a CINE Golden Eagle award. She appeared in another short film directed by Elizabeth Sung called The White Fox. Song next appeared in two episodes of the television program Thunder Alley, and was a regular in the children's television series Fudge, in which she portrayed Jenny. Her theatrical film debut was in Santa with Muscles, a 1996 independent film starring professional wrestler Hulk Hogan.

After a small role in Leave It to Beaver (1997), she appeared in the Nickelodeon television series 100 Deeds for Eddie McDowd, where she played Sariffa Chung in thirteen episodes. After 100 Deeds, she had a number of small parts in television shows such as 7th Heaven, Judging Amy, ER, Once and Again, The Brothers García, Popular, Bette, The Bernie Mac Show, The Nightmare Room, For the People, and George Lopez.

=== 2000s: Breakthrough with Disney ===
Two of Song's early roles led to recognition in the Young Artist Awards. Her role in the 2000 Disney Channel Original Movie, The Ultimate Christmas Present, won her the award for "Best Performance in a TV Movie Comedy, Supporting Young Actress". The film centers on two teenage girls, Allison Thompson (Hallee Hirsh) and Samantha Kwan (Song), who find a weather machine and make it snow in Los Angeles. Her 2002 appearance on The Bernie Mac Show led to her nomination for "Best Performance in a TV Comedy Series, Guest Starring Young Actress". In the same year, she was in the 20th Century Fox family film Like Mike, which grossed over $60 million. The film stars rapper Bow Wow as an orphan who can suddenly play NBA-level basketball. Song portrays the character Reg Stevens, a thirteen-year-old orphan.

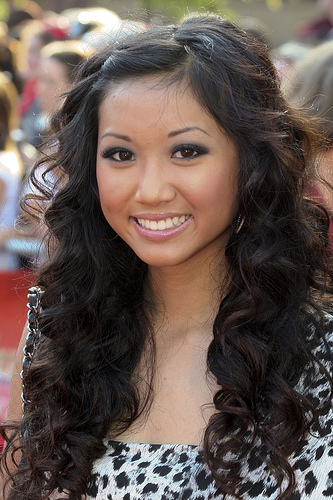
Song at Disneyland on March 23, 2008

In 2002, Song signed a contract with Disney and appeared in the Disney Channel movie Get a Clue (alongside Lindsay Lohan). Song continued to make guest appearances in Disney sitcoms such as That's So Raven and One on One. She had a recurring role as Tia in the Disney Channel series Phil of the Future, appearing in seven episodes of the series in 2004 and 2005. In Summer 2004, Song starred in the Disney Channel Original Movie Stuck in the Suburbs, portraying Natasha Kwon-Schwartz. The television premiere received 3.7 million viewers. The film is about two teenage girls living in suburbia who accidentally exchange cell phones with a famous teen singer. At age 15, she received an early acceptance letter from Harvard University that she turned down. Speaking of the time, she said, "My mom got breast cancer for the first time, I booked Suite Life, and I was accepted into the college I'd always wanted to go to." Her father encouraged her to take the role on Suite Life.

In 2005, Song began appearing in the role of spoiled heiress London Tipton in the Disney Channel Original Series, The Suite Life of Zack & Cody. The role was initially named "Paris" in an allusion to Paris Hilton. She got the role without an audition Song says, "London is my fantasy person, I wish I could be her. I wish I had her closet." The series is about the residents and workers at the fictional Tipton Hotel in Boston and mainly centers around the trouble-making twins, Zack and Cody Martin (Dylan and Cole Sprouse). The series premiered on the Disney Channel on March 18, 2005, receiving four million viewers, making it the most successful premiere for the Disney Channel in 2005. The series earned a 2007 Young Artist Award for "Best Family Television Series (comedy)", Emmy nominations for "Outstanding Children's Program" (twice) and "Outstanding Choreography", and three Nickelodeon Kids' Choice Award nominations for "Favorite TV show" in 2007, 2008, and 2009. In 2006 Song earned an Asian Excellence Award nomination for "Outstanding Newcomer" for her part in the series.

After her debut on the Suite Life series, Song became a regular on the Disney Channel, and had a voice role in Disney Channel's American Dragon: Jake Long series. In 2006, Song had a voice-over role in Holidaze: The Christmas That Almost Didn't Happen. She later starred in an online series called London Tipton's Yay Me!. Song was part of the Disney Channel Circle of Stars, a group of performers from several different Disney Channel television series. She was featured in the recording and music video of a version of "A Dream Is a Wish Your Heart Makes", which was included on the special edition Cinderella platinum edition DVD and on the DisneyMania 4 CD, released in April 2006. In the Suite Life High School Musical-themed episode, Song performed "Bop To The Top" and "Really Great". "Really Great" became the theme song for the online series, London Tipton's Yay Me!. She sang "Bling Is My Favourite Thing" on another Suite Life episode. In these episodes, Song purposefully sang poorly in character as London Tipton. In 2008, Ian Scott wrote and produced demo songs for her, credited to Mark Jackson Productions.

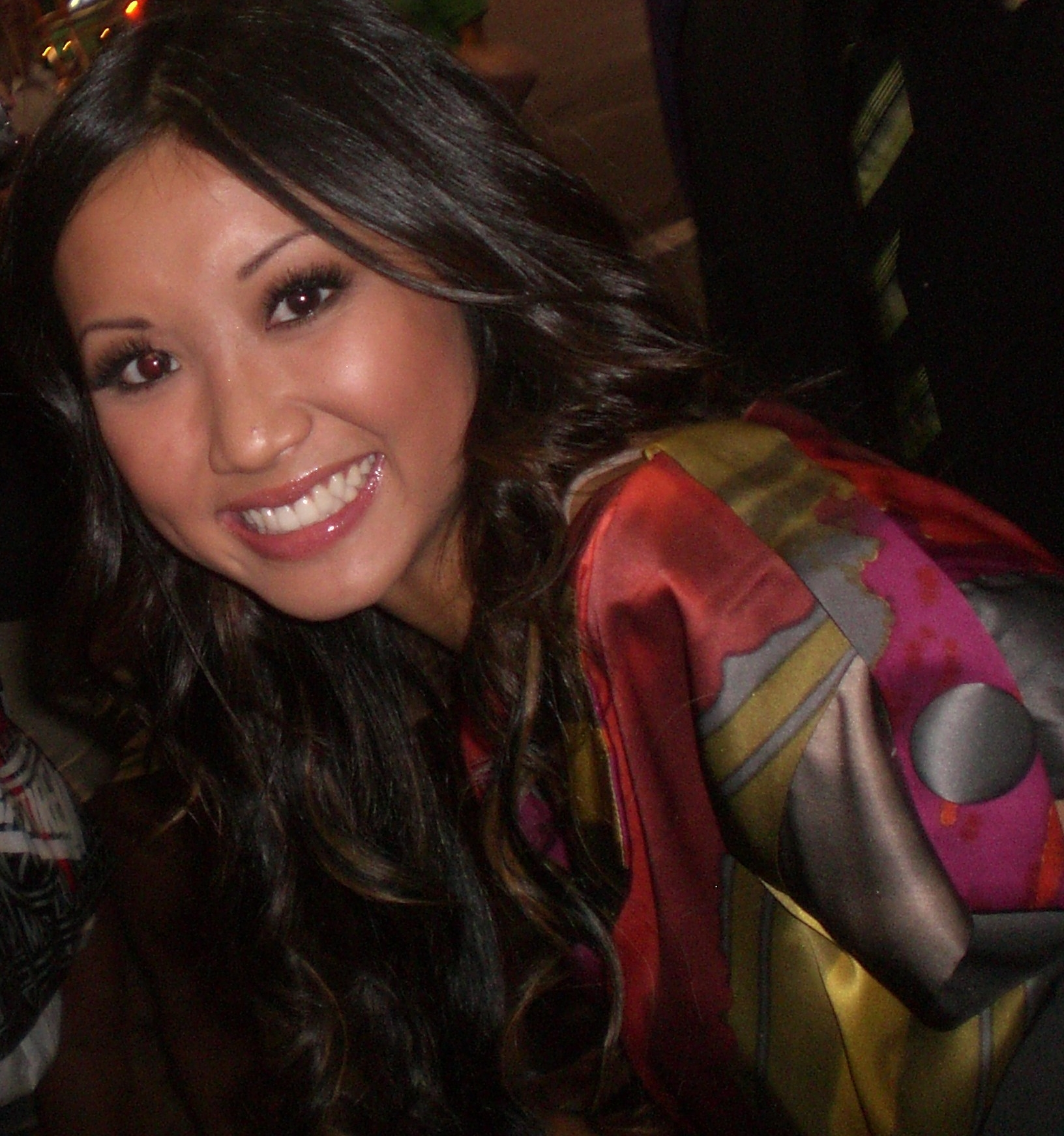
Song at The Cheetah Girls: One World premiere on August 12, 2008

Song's first starring role as the title character was in the 2006 Disney Channel Original Movie Wendy Wu: Homecoming Warrior, which had over 5.7 million viewers at its premiere. Song was originally planned to play a supporting role, but was offered the lead after starting training in martial arts. Lydia Cook, one of the films's directors, said, "She had the perfect combination of wit and martial arts." The film was about a Chinese-American teenager whose life is turned upside down by a visit from a young Chinese monk (Shin Koyamada); it also deals with Wendy's culture and heritage. Disney Channel executive vice president Gary Marsh called the film "Buffy the Vampire Slayer meets Crouching Tiger, Hidden Dragon" and said of Song: "She's incredibly talented, she's smart. She adds diversity to our network, and she's a real kid." Song felt she could relate to the character's struggles with her heritage since she knew little about her own people before making the film. To promote the film, she posed for the cover of Seventeen, Teen People, Teen, Seventeen Malaysia, and several other magazines, and traveled to Malaysia, Singapore, and Costa Rica. The film received positive reviews from critics. UltimateDisney.com called the film "a great showcase of talent in both acting and martial for Brenda Song." Allmovie described Song as a "charming and appealing personality". Song did most of her own stunt work for the film, with guidance from Koichi Sakamoto. According to The New York Times, the film became a "star vehicle" for Song.

Song reprised her role as London Tipton in the Suite Life spin-off, The Suite Life on Deck. The show's premiere on the Disney Channel drew 5.7 million viewers, and it became the most-watched series premiere on Canada's Family Channel. Disney ordered second and third seasons for the series. Song also starred as Paige in an animated television special for NBC, "Macy's Presents Little Spirit: Christmas in New York". In late 2008, Song made a special appearance at the grand opening of the RTA HealthLine in Cleveland. In May 2009, the cast of 'The Suite Life' became Disney Channel's longest running continuous characters on air. MSN's 2009 cover story on the series stated: "Song is one of the main reasons why the "Suite Life" franchise remains one of the most successful and highly rated series in the Disney stable." Also in 2009, she starred in the telefilm Special Delivery, a film about a bonded courier, Maxine (Lisa Edelstein) and a troubled teen, Alice (Song). The Daily Record called it a "likeable comedy". The Australian publication Urban CineFilm gave Song a positive review for her performance in the film. Song also appeared in the theatrical film College Road Trip with Raven-Symoné and Martin Lawrence.

=== 2010s: Mainstream transition ===
I was just like, 'I am an actor. When you hired me, I was not a hotel heiress. If I have ever done anything in my personal life to ever draw bad attention to your company, I understand. But this is the last season of the show, and this is the opportunity of a lifetime.' And I was so fortunate, they were so supportive. They allowed me to do this film that truly changed my life.

— Song speaking of her conflicts with Disney over The Social Network (2010)

In 2010, Song was the celebrity endorser of the Walt Disney Company's Disney Cruise Line. In 2011, she was also the spokesperson of the clothing brand OP. That same year, Song joined the main cast of Columbia Pictures' The Social Network alongside Jesse Eisenberg, Andrew Garfield and Justin Timberlake. Song portrayed Christy Lee, a Harvard University student who dates Eduardo Saverin (Andrew Garfield). Critically acclaimed, it is her first film to be inducted into the National Film Registry by the Library of Congress. She called The Social Network a role that "changed her life", and revealed in an interview with Variety that she had "fought" for the part, since Disney took issue with the film's sexual content. She further claimed that she lost an audition in 2008's Gran Torino on the same grounds.

In October 2011, Song starred in the sci-fi/dance film Boogie Town in Los Angeles. The film is a retelling of the tragedy Romeo and Juliet and is set in a futuristic New York City where dance battles are permanently banned. Song plays the role of Natalie, the female lead. In 2012, Song starred in the short film First Kiss along with her Social Network costar Joseph Mazzello. First Kiss was screened at numerous film festivals throughout the US and won the Best Short Film award at the Omaha Film Festival and TriMedia Film Festival.

In 2012 and 2013, Song had a recurring role as Alissa in the TV series Scandal in the first and second seasons. In 2013, Song had a recurring role as Daisy in New Girl. In August 2013, Song was cast in a leading role in the Fox television series Dads, in which Song portrayed Veronica. The series' pilot episode was criticized by Asian-American watchdog groups because Song's character wore a stereotypical "sexy Asian schoolgirl" costume, which was deemed "racist" by watchdog groups. In an interview with Entertainment Weekly, Song defended the series and denied the racism allegations. Fox refused to re-shoot the scenes. The series premiered September 17, 2013, but in May 2014, Fox canceled the series after only one season. In October 2014, Song signed a talent holding deal with Fox and 20th Century Fox Television to star in a television project. In April 2015, Song was cast in a regular role in the NBC comedy pilot Take It From Us. In November 2015, Song was cast in the CBS series Life in Pieces as Bonnie.

In February 2016, Song was cast in the CBS pilot Bunker Hill. Later renamed Pure Genius, the series was picked up by CBS and aired during the 2016-2017 television season, but was canceled after one season. In March 2017, Song was cast as a series regular in the CBS pilot Real Life. She was also cast in Seth Green's directorial debut Changeland, on which she worked with her future romantic partner, Macaulay Culkin. In August 2017, it was announced that Song would be starring in Freeform's first original holiday film, Angry Angel, which premiered November 18, 2017. In March 2018, it was revealed Song would join the cast of Station 19 for a multi-episode arc.

In December 2018, it was announced that Song would star in the Netflix psychological thriller Secret Obsession. The film was released on July 18, 2019. In January 2019, it was announced that Song would star in the Hulu television series Dollface alongside Kat Dennings. From 2019 to 2022, she voiced Anne Boonchuy in the Disney Channel animated series Amphibia. She also appeared as a guest star in Aly & AJ's music video for the song "Star Maps", from their 2019 EP Sanctuary.

=== 2020s: Renewed recognition ===
In 2022, Song began appearing on The Proud Family: Louder and Prouder, voicing news anchor Vanessa Vue. That same year, she starred as the lead character Alexa in the Amazon Freevee original movie Love Accidentally. Radhika Menon of Decider wrote, "The film under-uses Brenda Song." Also in 2022, she was part of an ensemble cast featured in the horror game The Quarry. In 2023, she began voicing Princess Akemi in the animated series Blue Eye Samurai. The following year, Song appeared in Operation Taco Gary's, a comedy film written and directed by Michael Kvamme in his directorial debut.

In an interview with The Hollywood Reporter's Seija Rankin, Song revealed that she found herself in a career slump in early 2023 and considered retiring. She was then cast as a showgirl in Gia Coppola's drama film The Last Showgirl, in which she thought her role would surprise audiences since her character works in adult entertainment. The Last Showgirl was released in 2024 and won Song a shared award at the San Sebastián International Film Festival. In 2025, she starred in the Mindy Kaling office comedy series Running Point. Of her performance, Time magazine wrote, "Song is a force of high-energy competence as Isla's (Kate Hudson) right-hand woman, though some independent storylines would help her escape an under-developed sidekick role should the show get a second season." For both The Last Showgirl and Running Point, Song was praised by Vanity Fair and media outlets for her career reinvention. Song herself credits these roles for allowing audiences to meet "the adult me."

In June 2025, Variety awarded her the Variety Virtuoso Award at the Bentonville Film Festival for Running Point. In July 2025, she announced the nominations for the 77th Primetime Emmy Awards at the Television Academy's Wolf Theatre in North Hollywood, Los Angeles, co-hosting with actor Harvey Guillén and Television Academy chair Cris Abrego. She had a voice cameo in the 2025 film Zootopia 2 as lynx Kitty Lynxley.

== Public image ==
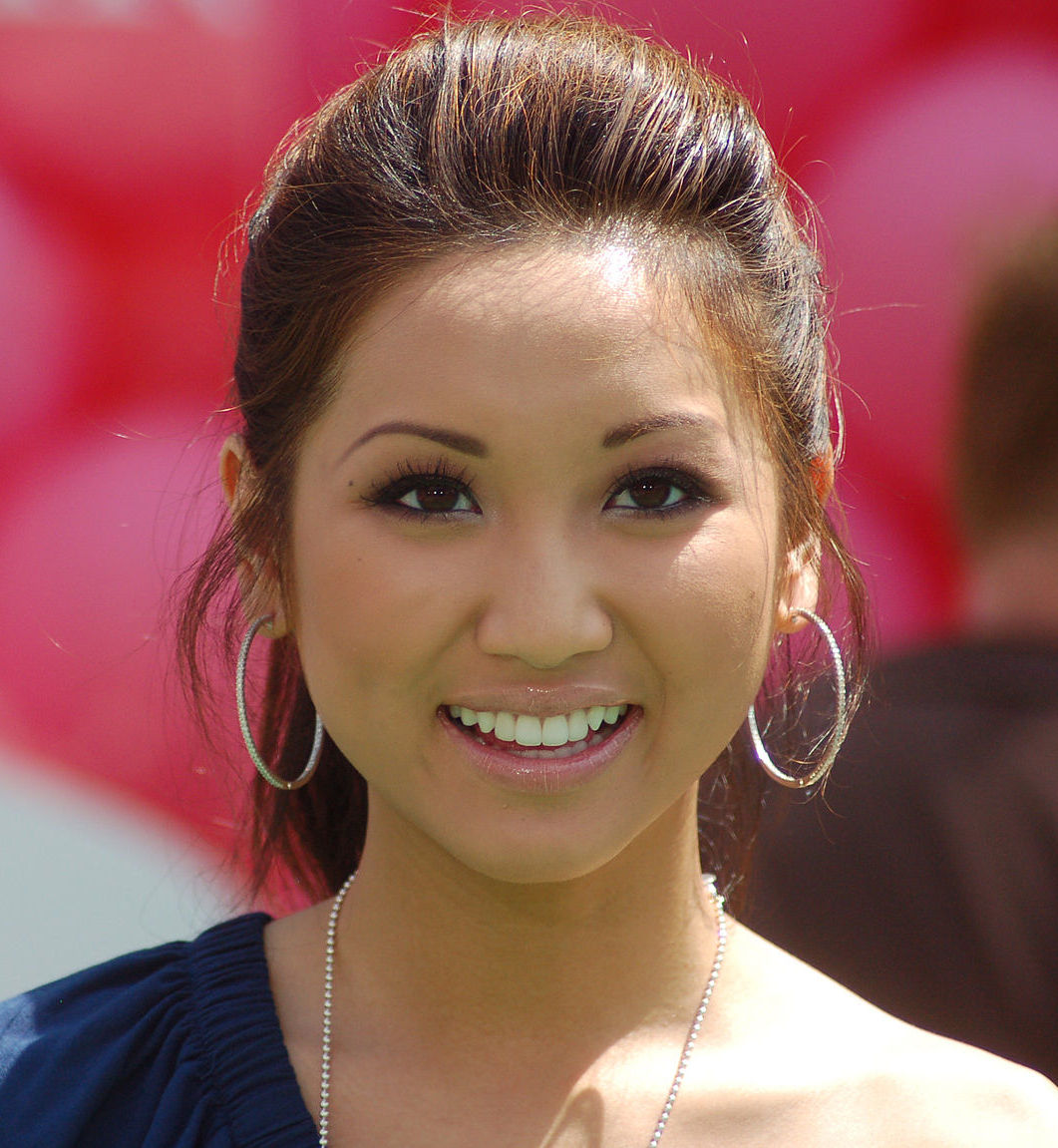
Song at the premiere of Up in 2009

In 2005, an article "Maths Spotlight on... Brenda Song" in Scholastic Math included facts about Song and mathematical guidance from her. In 2006, CosmoGirl named Song the "Queen of Disney", citing her major contributions on Disney Channel. Song ranked ninth in Netscape's 2007 "Top 10 Pretty Petites in Entertainment", was voted one of AOL's "Top 20 Tween (and Teen) TV Stars", and was ranked No. 3 on Maxim's Asian Hot 100 of 2008 list. Song was also ranked No. 45 in AIM's "Top 100 Celebs Under 25" list. TV Guide listed her in its 2008 list of "13 Hottest Young Stars to Watch". In 2009, Song was featured in Celebuzz's "Rising Stars" list; she was also described as one of "young Hollywood's most promising rising stars." In 2009, the blog Angry Asian Man named her one of the most influential Asian Americans under the age of 30.

In April 2008, a picture of Song was used in an ad for an escort agency in the LA Weekly. A representative from Disney told TMZ.com, "This is an unauthorized use of Brenda Song's image and her personal attorney has issued a cease and desist to the advertiser." Song filed a libel suit seeking $100,000 in damages. Song stated, "As a role model to millions of young people, I feel I have to take a stand against this company in regard to its exploitation of my image." The settlement was announced in March 2009.

== Personal life ==
From 2010 to 2017, Song was in an on-and-off relationship with musician Trace Cyrus, to whom she was engaged from 2011 to 2012. In 2018, Song shared that she was in a relationship with actor Macaulay Culkin, whom she met in June 2017 when they worked together on Changeland; they were seen dating the following month. Their first son was born in 2021. After more than four years of dating, Culkin and Song were engaged in January 2022. Song and Culkin's second son was born in 2022. The couple lives in Los Angeles.

Song is a fan of the Los Angeles Rams. Song appeared on the Manningcast's broadcast of Monday Night Football during a Rams game against the Buffalo Bills on October 12, 2026.

=== Activism ===
In 2006, Song was hostess for the "A World of Change" annual charity fashion show to benefit Optimist Youth Homes & Family Services. She also supported the 10th Annual L.A. Cancer Challenge. In 2006 and 2007, she participated in the YMCA Healthy Kids Day in Chicago. She began hosting a Disney special daily segment called Pass the Plate in 2007, in which she helped children and their families learn more about nutrition and healthy food. The series is produced in ten countries in association with Disney Channel. Song returned for the second season of the miniseries.

Song appeared alongside Paula Abdul and several other celebrities in a "Our Time to Vote" commercial, which aimed to encourage American citizens to vote during the 2008 presidential election. In 2008, Song was part of the "Power of Youth carnival," a benefit for the St. Jude's Children's Research Hospital. In 2009, Song participated in the "Diet Pepsi Easter Holiday House" event. She decorated an egg at the event that was sold in an online auction benefiting Feeding America.

Song was a spokesperson for Disney's environmental campaign, Disney's Friends for Change. She was featured in several commercials on the Disney Channel for the campaign. The charity aimed to explain how children can help preserve the Earth and invited them to go to the Friends for Change website to register and pledge, offering them the chance to help choose how Disney will invest $1 million in environmental programs.

== Filmography ==
=== Film ===
Year	Title	Role	Notes
1995	Requiem	Young Fong	Short film
1996	Santa with Muscles	Susan	
1997	Leave It to Beaver	Susan Akatsu	
1998	Blade	Hostage Child	Uncredited
1999	The White Fox	Sandy	Short film
2002	Like Mike	Reg Stevens	
2008	College Road Trip	Nancy	
2009	Boogie Town	Natalie	
2010	The Social Network	Christy Lee	
2010	Little Sister	Storyteller	
2011	The Little Engine That Could	Shiny Passenger Train (voice)	Direct-to-video
2011	Cinnamon	Cinnamon (voice)	Direct-to-video
2012	First Kiss	Samantha	Short film
2019	Changeland	Pen	
2019	Secret Obsession	Jennifer Allen Williams	
2020	Bobbleheads: The Movie	Kelani (voice)	Direct-to-video
2022	Love Accidentally	Alexa	
2024	The Last Showgirl	Mary-Anne	
2024	Operation Taco Gary's	Allison	
2025	Zootopia 2	Kitty Lynxley (voice)	
2027	The Fifth Wheel		Filming

=== Television ===
Year	Title	Role	Notes
1994–1995	Thunder Alley	Kathy	2 episodes
1995	Fudge	Jennie	2 episodes
1999	Once and Again	Chrissy	Episode: "There Be Dragons"
1999	MADtv	Trick-or-Treater	Episode: "Halloween Special Edition"
1999	Popular	Mandy Shepherd	Episode: "Fall on Your Knees"
2000–2002	100 Deeds for Eddie McDowd	Sariffa Chung	Recurring role; 19 episodes
2000	7th Heaven	Cynthia	2 episodes
2000	The Ultimate Christmas Present	Samantha Kwan	Disney Channel Original Movie
2000	The Brothers García	Jenny	Episode: "Love Me Tender"
2001	Bette	Stacey	Episode: "The Invisible Mom"
2001	ER	Lynda An	Episode: "Fear of Commitment"
2001	Judging Amy	Vanessa Pran	Episode: "Darkness for Light"
2002	The Bernie Mac Show	Shannon	Episode: "The King and I"
2002	The Nightmare Room	Tessa	Episode: "Dear Diary, I'm Dead"
2002	George Lopez	Jennifer	Episode: "Token of Unappreciation"
2002	Get a Clue	Jennifer	Disney Channel Original Movie
2002	For the People	Ellie	Episode: "The Double Standard"
2003	That's So Raven	Amber	Episode: "A Dog by Any Other Name"
2003	Lilo & Stitch: The Series	Mitzi Suzuki (voice)	2 episodes
2003	One on One	Asoniti	Episode: "Keeping It"
2004–2005	Phil of the Future	Tia	8 episodes
2004	Costume Party Capers: The Incredibles	Alex (voice)	Television film
2004	Stuck in the Suburbs	Natasha Kwon-Schwartz	Disney Channel Original Movie
2005–2008	The Suite Life of Zack & Cody	London Tipton	Main role (85 episodes)
2006	Wendy Wu: Homecoming Warrior	Wendy Wu	Disney Channel Original Movie; also co-producer
2006	Holidaze: The Christmas That Almost Didn't Happen	Treat (voice)	Television film
2006	American Dragon: Jake Long	Cheerleader Tracey (voice)	Episode: "Bring It On"
2007–2011	London Tipton's Yay Me! Starring London Tipton	London Tipton	Web series
2007–2008	Pass the Plate	Herself	Host
2008	Macy's Presents Little Spirit: Christmas in New York	Paige	Television film
2008	Special Delivery	Alice Cantwell	Television film
2008–2011	The Suite Life on Deck	London Tipton	Main role (71 episodes)
2009	Phineas and Ferb	Wendy (voice)	Episode: "Unfair Science Fair"
2009	Wizards of Waverly Place	London Tipton	Episode: "Cast-Away (to Another Show)"
2009	Hannah Montana	London Tipton	Episode: "Super(stitious) Girl"
2011	The Suite Life Movie	London Tipton	Disney Channel Original Movie
2011	Pixie Hollow Games	Chloe (voice)	Television special
2012	Key & Peele	Purple Falcon	Episode: "Power Falcons"
2012–2013	Scandal	Alissa	Recurring role; 4 episodes
2013	New Girl	Daisy	Recurring role; 4 episodes
2013–2014	Dads	Veronica	Main role
2014, 2018	Robot Chicken	Various voices	2 episodes
2014	The League	Rosette	Episode: "The Hot Tub"
2015	Miles from Tomorrowland	Frida Liang (voice)	3 episodes
2016	Life in Pieces	Bonnie	Episode: "Bite Flight Wing-Man Bonnie"
2016–2017	Pure Genius	Angie Cheng	Main role
2017	Superstore	Kristen	2 episodes
2017	Angry Angel	Allison Pyke	Freeform television film
2018–2020	Station 19	JJ	Recurring role; 10 episodes
2019–2022	Amphibia	Anne Boonchuy (voice)	Lead role
2019	Teen Girl in a Frog World	Anne Boonchuy (voice)	Web series
2019	Broken Karaoke	Anne Boonchuy (voice)	Web series
2020	Theme Song Takeover	Anne Boonchuy (voice)	Web series
2021	Amphibia: Vlogs from the Bog	Anne Boonchuy (voice)	Web series
2019–2022	Dollface	Madison Maxwell	Main role
2020	The Eric Andre Show	Herself	Episode: "The ASAP Ferg Show"
2022–2026	The Proud Family: Louder and Prouder	Vanessa Vue (voice)	6 episodes
2022, 2025	Chibiverse	Anne Boonchuy (voice)	2 episodes
2023–present	Blue Eye Samurai	Princess Akemi (voice)	Main role
2025	Shifting Gears	Caitlyn	Guest role
2025–present	Running Point	Ali Lee	Main role

=== Video games ===
Year	Title	Role	Notes
2022	The Quarry	Kaitlyn Ka	Voice, motion capture and likeness

== Bibliography ==
Year	Title	Original publisher	Notes
2025	The Art of Amphibia	Disney Press; TOKYOPOP	

== Awards and nominations ==
Year	Association	Category	Work	Result	Ref.
2001	Young Artist Awards	Best Performance in a TV Movie (Comedy), Supporting Young Actress	The Ultimate Christmas Present	Won	
2003	Young Artist Awards	Best Performance in a TV Comedy Series, Guest Starring Young Actress	The Bernie Mac Show	Nominated	
2006	Asian Excellence Awards	Newcomers Award	The Suite Life of Zack & Cody	Nominated	
2006	Young Hollywood Awards	Best Role Model	The Suite Life of Zack & Cody	Won	
2006	Young Hollywood Awards	Superstar of Tomorrow	The Suite Life of Zack & Cody	Won	
2009	Annual Crown Awards	Best Hairstyle on Television	The Suite Life of Zack & Cody	Won	
2010	Green Globe Film Awards	Outstanding Actors Asians in Hollywood	The Suite Life on Deck	Nominated	
2010	Hollywood Film Awards	Ensemble of the Year	The Social Network	Won	
2010	Phoenix Film Critics Society Awards	Best Ensemble Acting	The Social Network	Won	
2010	San Diego Film Critics Society Awards	Best Performance by an Ensemble	The Social Network	Nominated	
2010	Washington DC Area Film Critics Association Awards	Best Ensemble	The Social Network	Nominated	
2011	Central Ohio Film Critics Association Awards	Best Ensemble	The Social Network	Nominated	
2011	Gold Derby Awards	Best Ensemble Cast	The Social Network	Nominated	
2011	Palm Springs International Film Festival Awards	Best Ensemble Cast	The Social Network	Won	
2011	Nickelodeon Kids' Choice Awards	Funniest TV Sidekick	The Suite Life on Deck	Nominated	
2024	San Sebastián International Film Festival	Special Jury Prize (Note: Shared with Kiernan Shipka, Pamela Anderson, Billie Lourd, Dave Bautista and Jamie Lee Curtis)	The Last Showgirl	Won	
2025	Bentonville Film Festival	Variety Virtuoso Award	Running Point	Won	
