= List of Girlfriends' Guide to Divorce episodes =

Girlfriends' Guide to Divorce in an American drama television series on Bravo. It was developed by Marti Noxon and based on the Girlfriend's Guide book series by Vicki Iovine. The series premiered on December 2, 2014. The show was renewed for a second season which premiered on December 1, 2015. It is Bravo's first original scripted series.

On April 13, 2016, Bravo renewed the show for three more seasons. Season 3 began on January 11, 2017. Season 4 began on August 17, 2017. The fifth and final season premiered on June 14, 2018.

During the course of the series, 45 episodes of Girlfriends' Guide to Divorce aired.

== Series overview ==
Season	Episodes	Originally released	
Season	Episodes	First released	Last released
1	13	December 2, 2014	February 24, 2015
2	13	December 1, 2015	February 23, 2016
3	7	January 11, 2017	February 22, 2017
4	6	August 17, 2017	September 21, 2017
5	6	June 14, 2018	July 19, 2018

== Episodes ==
=== Season 1 (2014–15) ===
No. overall	No. in season	Title	Directed by	Written by	Original release date	U.S. viewers (millions)
1	1	"Rule No. 23: Never Lie to the Kids"	Adam Brooks	Marti Noxon	December 2, 2014	1.04
Abby McCarthy, a self-help author who writes about marriage and childcare, struggles to hide the truth about her marriage as she continues to spend time with divorced moms Phoebe and Lyla. Taking advantage of the separation, Abby goes out to a club where Phoebe kisses her and she hooks up with Will, a younger man. Lyla gets back at her ex-husband Dan after having sex with him. During a book signing, Abby breaks down and declares her book a lie, exposing the truth about her marriage.
2	2	"Rule No. 174: Never Trust Anyone Who Charges By the Hour"	Adam Brooks	Marti Noxon	December 9, 2014	0.84
After her breakdown at the book signing, Abby tries to do damage control and her agents tell her the new book deal is cancelled. Jake needs to find a place to live and gets help from Abby and his girlfriend, Becca Riley. Abby meets with Delia, a divorce attorney and Lyla's business rival, but Abby wants to try mediation. While floundering to find a job or a business idea, Phoebe continues to sleep with her ex, Ralf, who gives her extravagant gifts. Lyla gets payback on Dan after he has her car impounded with tickets, resulting in him asking for full custody. Jake and Abby hire their own lawyers.
3	3	"Rule No. 47: Always Take Advantage of "Me" Time"	Leslie Libman	Liz Kruger & Craig Shapiro	December 16, 2014	0.70
Abby's book sales are tanking and she spends her first weekend alone trying to come up with book ideas. However, after getting drunk and wrecking Lilly's poster, Abby, Phoebe and Lyla go out to find a new poster. Jake finally settles into his new place and has the kids over for the weekend. When the kids get bored, he calls Max for help and has Becca Riley come over to liven the evening. Lyla sends her nanny to story time at her kids' school, but gets reprimanded by the principal. Abby phone flirts with married dad and friend, Nate.
4	4	"Rule No. 426: Fantasyland: A Great Place to Visit"	Robert Duncan McNeill	Paul Adelstein	December 23, 2014	0.77
Abby pursues a relationship with Nate, but the reality of the relationship is awkward and disappointing. At the suggestion of everyone around her, Lyla tries to find methods of de-stressing, but a special massage goes bad. Max and Ford's relationship feels strained and when they are honored at the Family Equality Gala, the evening does not end well. Phoebe pursues a relationship with a married couple to help "save the marriage." Paul Adelstein does not appear in this episode.
5	5	"Rule No. 21: Leave Childishness to Children"	David Katzenberg	Ed Roe	December 30, 2014	0.87
Abby runs into Will and tries dating him, experiencing some youthfulness as a result. Lyla's mother (Bernadette Peters) visits during the weekend when she has her first dinner with a court-appointed caseworker. Phoebe's relationship with Vika and Merete reaches a new level. Jake has the kids for the weekend, but loses Lilly, who runs out to the same club where Abby is out with Will. Abby is called out by author Cleo Stevens.
6	6	"Rule No 33: When in Doubt, Run Away"	Victor Nelli, Jr.	Marti Noxon & Ilene Rosenzweig	January 6, 2015	0.87
Abby, Lyla, and Delia need a break and decide to join Phoebe in Vegas to promote her infant jewelry line. Abby uses the trip to gain some inspiration and enjoys an evening with a male escort. Lyla tries de-stress following an embarrassing dinner with a social worker and Delia runs into her difficult father. Becca is frustrated with Jake and they visit a shaman to help them make a deeper connection. Jake stumbles out of the retreat, high, and goes back home where he and Abby have sex. After finding out the custody mediation will not go in her favor, Lyla takes a "leave" from her job and tells the boys they should go on a trip.
7	7	"Rule No. 67: Don't Kill the Princess"	Daisy Mayer	Janine Nabers	January 13, 2015	0.77
Abby holds Lilly's birthday party at the house. She also sets the boundaries for the party, initially forbidding Becca from coming, but yields when the party turns out to be a bust. The party suffers a complication when the girls get drunk after using vodka-laced tampons. Delia handles the divorce of a wealthy businessman (Matthew Glave), but soon becomes enamored with him, starting a secret affair. Becca breaks up with Jake after finding out about his tryst with Abby.
8	8	"Rule No. 17: Ask the Answer Lady"	Brian Dannelly	Ashley Cardiff	January 20, 2015	0.69
While Abby tries to prep her new branding strategy, her friend Jo (Alanna Ubach) comes to L.A. to open a vegan bakery and she watches Charlie while Jake gets a directing job on "Blood Sisters." Phoebe preps for her baby jewelry press event, meets Ralf's new girlfriend, and realizes her business idea is not for her. Delia's affair with Gordon comes to a head when they reach an impasse with his ex-wife. After experiencing some discord, Max and Ford try to reconnect on a date.
9	9	"Rule No. 32: F-You, Rob Frumpkis"	Robert Duncan McNeill	Marti Noxon	January 27, 2015	0.91
Abby's pitch leads to an opportunity with Huffington Post in which she goes on ten dates -- one with former flame Will -- and writes about them. Looking for a new path in life, Phoebe volunteers with HomeGrown Urban Farm while clashing with the head farmer, Marco (Brandon Jay McLaren). Delia reaches an agreement with Courtney but breaks up with Gordon after finding out he slept with her. Jo accompanies Abby on several of her dates and goes home with one of them, which leads to a fight with Abby. Meanwhile, Jo's daughter Zooey flies in to stay with her in Abby's guest house. Max and Ford settle their issues by reverting to their old arrangement. Will stays over with Abby, cooks her breakfast, and asks her to read his manuscript.
10	10	"Rule No. 3: Don't Stand in the Doorway"	Silver Tree	Liz Kruger & Craig Shapiro	February 3, 2015	0.74
Abby's article about Ten Dates trends all over social media and she is offered a job as an editor-at-large. However, the article also creates problems for Lilly as her name appears on a slut list circulating throughout the school. Delia struggles to let Gordon into her life while Phoebe helps make Marco's business more successful. When Jo tries to settle her financials and send Zooey to school, she finds out that her husband has a second wife. Abby reads Will's manuscript and is pleased to find it good.
11	11	"Rule No. 46: Keep the Holidays Low Key"	Robert Duncan McNeill	Ed Roe	February 10, 2015	0.83
Abby hosts a last-minute Thanksgiving dinner for her friends and boyfriend, but has to add the kids to the mix when Jake gets sick (he eventually attends when Charlie begs for him to come). Delia deals with her difficult father while Phoebe invites Marco to the Thanksgiving dinner. Meanwhile, Abby and Jo look through a box found in the backyard containing photos and letters of a former tenant.
12	12	"Rule No. 92: Don't Do the Crime If You Can't Do the Time"	Millicent Shelton	Ilene Rosenzweig	February 17, 2015	0.74
Abby and Jake's divorce is coming to a close, but Abby gets cold feet when Jake starts making strides in his career. After Gordon pulls his business from the law firm, Delia must face her unresolved issues with Gordon to save her job. Phoebe has trouble facing a person from her past while defining the limitations of her relationship with Marco. Jo tries to help Zooey become more social at school while helping out with the school fundraiser.
13	13	"Rule No. 101: Know When It's Time to Move On"	Robert Duncan McNeill	Marti Noxon	February 24, 2015	0.79
Abby and Jake finalize the divorce and go out on a date to sign the papers, but by the end of the evening, Jake proposes that they don't file the papers. Delia is offered a partnership at the firm, but upon learning the terms of deal, she demands a full equity partnership. Meanwhile, Delia reconciles with Gordon but when confronted with the idea of marriage, she becomes apprehensive. Jo holds a party to celebrate Abby's divorce. After blowing up at Kori at school, Phoebe confides in Abby and Marco about her abusive relationship with Kori when she was a young model. Max and Ford continue their arrangement, but soon find out how complicated it is. Becca tells Jake that she is pregnant. Zooey decides to go visit her Dad his other family.

=== Season 2 (2015–16) ===
No. overall	No. in season	Title	Directed by	Written by	Original release date	U.S. viewers (millions)
14	1	"Rule No. 58: Avoid the Douchemobile"	Adam Brooks	Marti Noxon	December 1, 2015	0.70
Abby and Jake are secretly hooking up with each other while she negotiates with an online magazine called SheShe, where she touts the benefits of divorce. One of the editors Barbara (Retta) disagrees. Delia gets engaged to Gordon. Kori puts out a restraining order against Phoebe after her "attack." Phoebe decides to go public with her abuse as a young model. Jo asks Abby if she and Zooey can move in permanently. Becca tells Jake that she has decided to keep the baby. Will discovers that Abby and Jake are sleeping together.
15	2	"Rule No. 77: Don't Blow The Bubble"	Brian Dannelly	Carol Barbee	December 8, 2015	0.62
After walking in on Abby and Jake making out, Zooey promises to not tell anyone and the two continue to keep their relationship a secret. One of the SheShe people tells Abby that she is the sexy face of divorce and needs go to events such as fashion shows. Jo prepares for the opening of her vegan bakery, Rize, and tangles with her volatile and eccentric chef, Scott, over ingredients for his recipes. Delia meets with a wedding planner, Jo finds a new place to live, and Phoebe and Marco break up.
16	3	"Rule No. 8: Timing Is Everything"	Randy Zisk	Marti Noxon and Lisa Edelstein	December 15, 2015	0.59
Abby goes on a date with a TV doctor, Dr. Harris. Everyone plans for Delia and Gordon's engagement party. Jo decides to take some time off from seeing Abby. Jake tells Becca that he is back together with Abby but he hasn't told her yet about Becca's pregnancy. At Gordon's urging, Delia asks his mother to help plan the wedding. Abby gets angry at Jake when she finds out that he went a month without telling her about Becca's pregnancy.
17	4	"Rule No. 605: You Can Go Home Again"	Robert Duncan McNeill	Paul Adelstein	December 22, 2015	0.57
After sending the kids away, Abby and Jake spend the weekend alone at home to re-evaluate their relationship. When Delia and Gordon go house hunting they find out that they have different tastes. Zooey returns from visiting her father and step-mother in Kentucky and Jo feels pangs of jealous over Zooey's positive relationship with Frumpkis's new wife. Jake and Abby realize they still love each other but their insecurities will prevent them from being a couple again.
18	5	"Rule No. 72: It's Never Too Late to Be a Mean Girl"	Millicent Shelton	Adam Milch	December 29, 2015	0.68
Phoebe wants to celebrate her GED with a 1980s prom that turns from a celebration of Phoebe into a social media opportunity for Abby's column with SheShe. Delia negotiates a pre-nup with Gordon. Abby goes on a second date with Dr. Harris. Frumpkis comes to Los Angeles to spend time with Zooey. After seeing a totally reformed Rob Frumpkis, Jo discovers that she wants him back. Instead, he plans to move to L.A. with his new wife. Lilly wants to move in with Jake. Delia sleeps with Albert.
19	6	"Rule No. 25: Beware the Second Chance"	J. Miller Tobin	Ilene Rosenzweig	January 5, 2016	0.60
Abby travels to New York for the ABC Conference to sell her "Girlfriends Guide to Divorce" and serves on a panel discussion with Harris and they have phone sex. TMZ reveals Becca's baby news and they must break the news to Lilly and Charlie. Jo finally meets Frumpkis' new wife Charlene. Phoebe takes a class on Gender Studies.
20	7	"Rule No. 14: No...Means No"	Michael B. Silver	Janine Nabers	January 12, 2016	0.76
Abby gets a visit from her parents George (Barry Bostwick) and Dina (Lesley Ann Warren) who have their own agenda for Abby. Jo is in danger of losing the bakery because of her custody battle with her ex. Jo starts aggressively dating online and Phoebe starts dating an LA artist (Niall Matter). Abby helps Becca get through a pregnancy emergency. Delia continues an affair with a partner in her law firm and Jake leaves for Latvia for a few months to direct a movie. Harris is evasive.
21	8	"Rule No. 79: Labels Are For Canned Goods"	Silver Tree	Ashley Cardiff	January 19, 2016	0.65
Abby and Barbara attend SplitCon, a convention for divorced people. Frumpkis ask Jo if Charlene can co-manage the bakery since he owns half of the store, much to her chagrin. Delia tells her boss that they must end their affair. Phoebe's new beau introduces her to the LA art scene. Jo catches Charlene fooling around with Scott and orders Frumpkis to leave the store alone until the judge decides who gets it. Abby confess to one of the guys at SheShe that she tried to reconcile with Jake. Someone sends Delia incriminating photos of her affair with Albert.
22	9	"Rule No. 81: There's No Crying in Porn"	Robert Duncan McNeill	Marti Noxon & Vicki Iovine	January 26, 2016	0.74
Harris sends Abby mixed signals. Zooey and Charlene bond over tennis lessons and Jo feels left out. Abby runs into Carl, the professional gigolo she met while in Las Vegas, who is currently in L.A. entertaining a client. Jo warns Charlene not to do anything nuts around Zooey or she's going after her. Delia worries about Gordon finding about her affair with Albert and eventually learns that he is a serial cheater. Abby throws a baby shower for Becca. Phoebe meets J.D., an extremely shy artist, and is intrigued by him and his work.
23	10	"Rule No. 36: If You Can't Stand the Heat, You're Cooked"	Uta Briesewitz	Adam Milch	February 2, 2016	0.69
Abby's editor wants her to speed up progress on her book and to include more celebrity details about Becca and Harris. Phoebe introduces J.D. to Ralph, who then helps put on an exhibit and auction for J.D.'s art. The girls question Abby about her taking care of Becca. Ralf wants to see Phoebe again. Abby hosts a party at her house with disastrous results: Dr. Harris arrives, meeting Charlie and finding out that Becca is staying in the guest house, Delia is embarrassed by Gordon's rude behavior, and Jo and Scott consummate their feelings for each other. Becca goes into labor with Abby at her side. Abby faints when she sees that the baby boy is black.
24	11	"Rule No. 118: Let Her Eat Cake"	Andy Wolk	Ilene Rozenwwig	February 9, 2016	0.64
Abby has been admitted to the hospital after she passed out. During her checkup the doctor tells her that she doesn't look too good and prescribes her with fluids, to eat a sandwich, and rest. Abby tells the kids that Jake is not the father of Becca's baby. Lilly asks if she can still see the baby and maybe babysit for Becca sometime. Things get awkward between Jo and Scott at work so they talk about the night before. J.D. insults Phoebe in front of an art dealer. Delia gets surprised with a bachelorette party. At the party Abby gets drunk, out of control and outs Delia and Albert's affair to everyone. Albert tells Delia to marry him instead but tells him no, they're through.
25	12	"Rule No. 876: Everything Does Not Happen For a Reason"	Robert Duncan McNeil	Ashley Cardiff & Janine Nabers	February 16, 2016	0.64
Delia's wedding day has arrived, and Abby says she's not going. Abby rushes to finish her book. Zooey tells Jo that Charlene left Frumpkis, and that she is worried about her dad's drinking problem. Jo, Phoebe, and Barbara stop by Abby's to check on her and drag her to the wedding. Before heading to the church, Gordon receives a package with the pictures of Delia and Albert together. Abby's editor says her book is gibberish and wants a re-write. Gordon confronts Delia and has her go through the wedding as a punishment, then leaves her as soon as the wedding is over.
26	13	"Rule No. 59: Happily Ever After Is An Oxymoron"	Marti Noxon	Marti Noxon	February 23, 2016	0.76
Delia and her friends try to hide Gordon's absence during the reception. Abby's editor reveals that Carl discusses personal details in his book about many women he has been with, including Abby. Jake returns from Latvia and visits Becca, who asks Jake to take care of the baby so she can rest. J.D. and Phoebe reveal they got married the day before. Scott expresses his feelings for Jo and Frumpkis makes a scene at the reception. Kat insists that Abby write a tell-all book. Instead, Abby fires Kat. Becca disappears.

=== Season 3 (2017) ===
No. overall	No. in season	Title	Directed by	Written by	Original release date	U.S. viewers (millions)
27	1	"Rule No. 43: When One Door Opens, There's An Icy Draft"	Robert Duncan McNeil	Marti Noxon & Emily Fox	January 11, 2017	0.44
Stuck with Becca's baby for days, Jake suggests surrendering the baby at a fire station. Abby offers to take care of him. When Abby proposes a change in her brand, Mitchell fires her from SheShe and has Barbara write Abby's column. Delia wants to move to New York for a fresh start. Abby discovers she is having hot flashes when she mistakes it for the baby having a fever. Becca finally returns from Florida, but Abby worries about her fitness as a mother. Phoebe's alimony and support ends. Jake offers to support Abby for awhile.
28	2	"Rule No. 137: Move Your Car"	Brian Dannelly	Adam Milch & Vince Calandra	January 18, 2017	0.37
Charlie starts playing baseball and Abby clashes with his coach when Charlie is benched. JD and Phoebe try to cut expenses, but Phoebe isn't being realistic. Jo drops Frumpkis off at rehab and decides to break things off with Scott, who disappears from his trailer. Delia's ego gets the best of her when she competes for a demanding client.
29	3	"Rule No. 188: Mind Your Side of the Plate"	Michael B. Silver	Lisa Edelstein	January 25, 2017	0.40
Jo is depressed and Abby's agent urges her to write romance. Phoebe and JD take her kids camping. Abby accepts Barbara's invitation to spend a night out, but the atmosphere is not what Abby is used to and she is rude to both Barbara and Charlie's coach. Ethan gets Jo's attention for his excellent baking skills and Zooey is smitten. Abby apologizes to both Barbara and Coach Mike and she starts fantasizing about a baseball-themed romance novel.
30	4	"Rule No. 225: What Happens in Bakersfield Stays in Bakersfield"	Steven Tsuchida	Ilene Rosenzweig	February 1, 2017	0.40
While Abby travels to Bakersfield for Charlie's baseball tournament, Jo, Phoebe, and Delia head to a Palm Springs resort that turns out to be filled with Cher fans. Phoebe is out of money but won't tell her friends. Abby tries to bond with the other baseball moms but ends up creating problems for the team and Coach Mike. Frumpkis leaves rehab early and works at the bakery. Delia sees Gordon in Palm Springs and he agrees to talk over breakfast, but only to tell her he never wants to see her again. Phoebe meets Gemma Sacco, an art collector, who is flaky but whose life fascinates Phoebe.
31	5	"Rule No. 99: Cook Naked"	Kat Coiro	Janine Nabers	February 8, 2017	0.42
Abby and Mike continue their physical relationship and Abby hosts a party for Charlie's baseball team as a way to spend time with him. Barbara looks to get her kitchen remodeled, and Phoebe introduces her to Darrell (Malcolm-Jamal Warner) to give her design ideas but his taste is too expensive for Barbara. Abby discovers that Mike is still living with his ex-wife and Frumpkis collapses at home. At the hospital, he admits the true extent of his alcoholism to Jo, who tells him that he has to get clean for real this time. Phoebe spends time with Gemma.
32	6	"Rule #No. 218: There's No Crying in Baseball"	Andy Wolk	Matthew Shire	February 15, 2017	0.28
Abby is processing that Mike is still living with his ex and she tries to make it through Charlie's last baseball game of the season without creating conflict. Lilly and Zooey fight over Ethan which leads to Zooey bullying Lilly. Standing up for their daughters, Abby and Jo end up fighting with each other. Barbara quits SheShe when her raise doesn't happen. Mike finds a place of his own.
33	7	"Rule No. 91: Run Toward What Scares You"	Robert Duncan McNeill	Adam Milch & Emily Fox	February 22, 2017	0.29
Abby reads her book to the girls and they love it, but her editor advises her to take out all the "baseball." Phoebe and J.D. participate in an orgy at Gemma's cabin that strains their relationship. Jo joins a boxing/meditation class to relieve her hostility. Barbara interviews for jobs. Abby feels confused about her book and her relationship with Mike. Delia continues working for the Legal Aid even though her hours have been completed. Abby asks Barbara to join her in a new website venture. Ethan and Lilly sleep together.

=== Season 4 (2017) ===
No. overall	No. in season	Title	Directed by	Written by	Original release date	U.S. viewers (millions)
34	1	"Rule No. 776: The Cat is Always on the Roof"	Robert Duncan McNeill	Emily Fox	August 17, 2017	0.37
Barbara and Abby launch the "Lady Parts" website, but they quickly learn they need more traffic. Jo cuts out booze and sugar and is obsessed with her sparring partner ("Bald Eagle") but she doesn't know his real identity. Delia and Paul discuss suing a billionaire slumlord on behalf of their clients. Phoebe agrees to host a celebrity-studded party for Gemma. Abby and Barbara crash the party to coerce an "influencer" to endorse "Lady Parts." Delia and Paul also attend and they are able to serve a summons to the billionaire slumlord. Abby's ex, Will, helps her tweet out a celebrity endorsement for "Lady Parts." Gemma asks for a piece of Phoebe's jewelry and she hands it over. Abby finds Lilly and Ethan in her bed.
35	2	"Rule No. 10: Just Survive"	Scott Williams	Ilene Rosenzweig	August 24, 2017	0.36
Abby insists on taking Lilly to her first gynecology appointment, leaving Barbara to make the company's first TV appearance alone. Secretly, Abby arranges for a media coach who flusters Barbara. Gemma urges Phoebe to ask J.D. for a piece of art for an upcoming event. She asks to reconcile and they sleep together, but when J.D. learns the real reason for her visit, he sends Phoebe away. Delia and Paul disagree on a strategy for their legal case because Paul wants to run for City Council. During a mountain retreat, Jo and Albert realize their true identities. Lilly confesses to Abby she thinks she is in love with Ethan. Phoebe realizes she doesn't want to end up like Gemma, quits her job, and asks J.D. to come back.
36	3	"Rule No. 706: Let Them Eat Cupcakes"	Tanya Wexler	Janine Nabers & Emmylou Diaz	August 31, 2017	0.37
Barbara and Abby listen to their first product pitch for the website. Phoebe struggles with job hunting and parenthood and hires Delia to represent her in child custody negotiations with Ralf. Abby's father has a stroke, so she leaves "Lady Parts" in Barbara's hands to join her mother who is acting strangely and baking compulsively. While at the hospital, Abby's mother dies in the waiting room and her father wakes up, asking for his wife. Delia, Jo, and Phoebe arrive to help.
37	4	"Rule No. 49: Let It Shine"	Terrell Clegg	Matthew Shire	September 7, 2017	0.42
Abby and friends tackle the extensive "to do" list for Abby's mother's funeral. Abby's eulogy goes off the rails. Delia and Jo can't stop bickering over Albert. Abby's father drifts in and out of reality and eventually pays tribute to his wife. Mike shows up at the funeral and Max reveals his marriage is ending. Lilly tells her mother Ethan broke up with her. Charley sees his mother kiss Mike. Delia and Paul decide to agree on a big settlement and to continue a personal relationship.
38	5	"Rule No. 930: Plan for New Plans"	Jude Weng	Matthew Scott Hunter	September 14, 2017	0.42
While her father recovers in her guest house, Abby returns to work. Delia begins working on Paul's campaign and is confronted by her past. Phoebe starts to downsize. Abby and Barbara do not seem united on their new path forward. Abby's father has a near tragedy in the kitchen.
39	6	"Rule No. 155: Go with the Magician"	Jonathan Frakes	Adam Milch	September 21, 2017	0.32
Abby and Barbara try counseling in order to repair their business relationship. Delia collapses in a client meeting at the firm. Darrell shuts down on Barbara at a party and when she confronts Darrell about feeling "she will never be enough," he reassures her. Jo pursues opening a new business next door and Albert offers to help fund it. Delia reveals to Paul that she might be pregnant just before he takes the stage for a candidate debate. Abby moves her father into a retirement home. Phoebe's brother Tony unexpectedly appears at her door. Delia takes a pregnancy test. Mike offers support for Abby.

=== Season 5 (2018) ===
No. overall	No. in season	Title	Directed by	Written by	Original release date	U.S. viewers (millions)
40	1	"Rule No. 773: Step and Repeat"	Robert Duncan McNeill	Emily Fox	June 14, 2018	0.42
The episode begins at a gala event for Redbook Magazine with flashbacks for each character. Abby and Mike grow closer, Lilly applies for colleges, Abby asks Mike and his family to move in with her. As Barbara and Darrell's relationship slows down in the romance department, Darrell encourages Barbara to be nicer to her ex. She follows his advice and they reignite old passions. Jo's stress rises as her work life gets busier and it takes its toll on her relationship with Albert, but when she pays back his loan she feels free to pursue their relationship. Paul loses the City Council race and tells Delia he wants to have a child with her. She accepts and he proposes, but Delia freaks out about marriage and gives him back the ring. Barbara tells Darrell he is too good for her and they break up. Phoebe agrees to let Tony move in to the guest house.
41	2	"Rule No. 149: Don't Eat the Yellow Snow"	Robert Duncan McNeill	Ilene Rosenzweig	June 21, 2018	0.45
Frumpkis's mother, Meryl (Talia Shire) comes to town to convince Jo to reunite with her son when he leaves rehab. Albert plans an elaborate birthday party for Jo. Delia shops for sperm donors. Jake introduces Abby to his new girlfriend, Natalie, and tells her he plans to propose. After the party, Tony is confronted by his parole officer in front of Phoebe and her family. Mike expresses concern over Jake and Abby's fight at the party and tells her to set some boundaries.
42	3	"Rule No. 97: It Takes Two to Stab Yourself in the Butt"	Janice Cooke	Janine Nabers	June 28, 2018	0.44
Albert feels out of place as Frumpkis returns from rehab. Abby gets in the middle of a discipline issue over Symone and Colette reveals her hostility. Worried about his working proximity to Colette, Abby drops into his late night work meeting and humiliates herself. Delia starts fertility treatments. Barbara tells her sister the truth about Leon.
63	4	"Rule No. 63: It's a Marathon, Not a Sprint"	Lisa Edelstein	Emmylou Diaz & Matt Shire	July 5, 2018	0.42
Abby throws a party to entice marathon runner, Tess Fury, into a "Lady Parts" endorsements, but she is reluctant until Phoebe explains the web company's philosophy. Colette comes to pick up the kids even though it is Mike's week for visitation. Zooey gets into a car accident while practice driving with Frumpkis. Delia starts an affair with Tony, who is fired from his job and lies to his sister. Phoebe coaches Tess through her photo shoot and after the race, Tess acknowledges her feelings for Phoebe with a kiss. Colette takes a job miles away, leaving the kids with Mike and Abby.
44	5	"Rule No. 303: Burn That S... to the Ground"	Alysse Leite-Rogers	Adam Milch & Emily Fox	July 12, 2018	0.49
Abby needs a strong pitch for "Lady Parts" products but is distracted by Lilly's imminent departure for college and Symone's emotional needs. Delia's client service suffers as she deals with her personal issues. Phoebe and Tess pursue their relationship. Albert takes Jo on a getaway weekend, but Frumpkis makes another attempt to reconcile. Abby realizes she can't make the blended family situation work. Delia tells Tony she doesn't want him to participate with the baby.
45	6	"Rule No. 1: Keep the Toast Short"	Robert Duncan McNeill	Adam Milch & Marti Noxon	July 19, 2018	0.52
Abby plans Lilly's high school graduation party and asks Jake to go in on a car as a graduation present. They end up stranded in the middle of nowhere on a test drive and almost miss Lilly's graduation. Barbara decides to take a job as a co-host on a morning news show. Phoebe and Tess get closer, but Tony is fired again. In the final scene, the party turns into Lilly's college graduation party from Emerson College and the resolution of each character's storyline is revealed as Abby leads a toast "to love."
