= Billy's Dad Is a Fudge-Packer! =

Billy's Dad is a Fudge-Packer!
- Directed by: Jamie Donahue
- Written by: Jamie Donahue
- Produced by: Steak House; Juli Vizza
- Starring: Spencer Daniels; Robert Gant
- Cinematography: Thomas L. Callaway
- Edited by: Juli Vizza
- Music by: Rob Cairns
- Distributed by: Power Up Films
- Release date: November 7, 2004
- Running time: 10 minutes
- Country: United States
- Language: English

Billy's Dad is a Fudge-Packer! is a 2004 American black-and-white short comedy film written and directed by Jamie Donahue in her first non-acting effort. It is a parody of the 1950s social guidance films, and depicts the life of a boy learning about adulthood in a traditional family. The apparently innocent account of family life in the 1950s is loaded with sexual innuendo. It was made by production company POWER UP.

== Plot ==
Billy is a boy who has to decide what he will do with his life. He can't decide between a cowboy or a policeman. His father also suggests an Indian and construction worker. All four of these are characters in the Village People. His father works at the candy factory as a "fudge packer" (which is modern slang for a man who performs homosexual anal sex) and "has several men under him". His mother is visited by a short, mannish woman who knows how to please the local housewives. His sister is preparing to be a good wife, and in almost every shot is moving a phallic object to her mouth.

== Cast ==
- Spencer Daniels as Billy
- Robert Gant as Billy's dad
- Cady Huffman as Billy's mom
- Alex Borstein as Betty Henderson
- Gina Rodgers as Billy's sister
- D. C. Douglas as 50's announcer

== Film festivals ==
Film festivals in which Billy's Dad Is a Fudge-Packer! appeared include:

=== 2005 ===
- Sundance Film Festival
- Tribeca Film Festival
- PlanetOut Film Festival COMEDY FINALIST
- Austin Gay & Lesbian International Film Festival
- Boston Gay & Lesbian Film Festival
- Brisbane Queer Film Festival
- Cineffable – Paris Lesbian Film Festival
- Cinequest
- Closet Cinema - Southwest Gay and Lesbian Film Festival
- Comedia - Just for Laughs
- Connecticut Gay & Lesbian Film Festival
- Fairy Tales International Gay & Lesbian Film Festival
- FilmOut San Diego
- Frameline
- Fresno Reel Pride Film Festival
- Image + Nation – Montreal Gay & Lesbian Film Festival
- Inside Out - Toronto Lesbian & Gay Film and Video Festival
- London Lesbian Film Festival
- Martha's Vineyard Independent Film Festival
- Melbourne Queer Film Festival
- Miami Gay & Lesbian Film Festival
- Nashville Film Festival
- Newport Beach Film Festival
- North Carolina Gay & Lesbian Film Festival
- OUT Loud Long Beach Art & Film Festival
- Oslo Gay & Lesbian Film Festival
- Outfest
- Palm Springs International Festival of Short Films
- Philadelphia Gay & Lesbian Film Festival
- PlanetOut Film festival
- Q Cinema-Fort Worth Gay & Lesbian Film Festival
- Queer Screen-Mardi Gras Film Festival, Darlinghurst, Australia
- Queersicht – Bern, Switzerland Gay & Lesbian Film Festival
- Reel Affirmations – Washington DC GLBT Film Festival
- Reel Queer Syracuse
- Rhode Island International Film Festival
- Sacramento International Gay & Lesbian Film Festival
- Seattle Lesbian and Gay Film festival

== Reception ==
Apocalypse Later Film Reviews said, It's hard for a film to live up to a title like this, but Billy's Dad is a Fudge-Packer! manages it with aplomb."
