= Operation Taco Gary's =

2026 American Sci-Fi Comedy Film

- Release poster
- Directed by: Michael Kvamme
- Written by: Michael Kvamme
- Produced by: Matthew Vaughan
- Starring: Simon Rex; Dustin Milligan; Brenda Song; Jason Biggs; Arturo Castro; Tony Cavalero; Doug Jones
- Cinematography: Zoran Popovic
- Edited by: Josh Crockett; Spencer Houck
- Music by: Jason Lazarus
- Production companies: Rotten Science; Mosaic
- Distributed by: Chroma
- Release dates: October 25, 2024 (Austin Film Festival); February 27, 2026 (United States)
- Running time: 87 minutes
- Country: United States
- Language: English

Operation Taco Gary's is a 2024 American science fiction action comedy film written and directed by Michael Kvamme and starring Simon Rex, Dustin Milligan, Brenda Song, Jason Biggs, Arturo Castro, Tony Cavalero, and Doug Jones. It is Kvamme’s feature directorial debut.

== Plot ==
Danny pays his brother Luke a surprise visit, and learns that he is going to Ottawa, Canada. Danny claims to have a job in Tucson, but is unable elaborate further. Elsewhere, police enter an apartment and find a Taco Gary bag on the floor, and refer to Danny being a wanted felon. Danny and Luke pause at a gas station while driving, and when they see an elderly woman waiting in her car, Danny suddenly threatens her with a knife and questions her about Taco Gary's and whether or not she is a "Member of the Coalition". Realizing that she doesn't know anything, he apologizes for his mistake. Luke observes that the medication in Danny's backpack are actually M&M's, implying that Danny is not taking the regular pills required to maintain his mental health.

Angry with Danny's strange behavior, Luke attempts to drop Danny off by the side of the road, but Danny shoots Luke's neck with Ketamine, rendering him unconscious. When Luke wakes up, they find that their truck is seized by the police. The cops chase both the brothers into the woods, but call it off when one of the cops trips and falls down injured.

The brothers meet up with Allison and Klyle. Danny shows the contents of his backpack to Klyle, who says it's worth $27.7 million. The group drives to a Taco Gary's, where Klyle talks of a Coalition and the Galactic Slave Market. Luke walks to a bar nearby and calls 911, saying he's kidnapped by his brother. But instead of a police car, an armed man (Tiago) who is not a cop, picks up Luke and takes him to see Jason Biggs. They find a cube in Luke's pocket and when it is twisted, a blinding light comes forth, knocking Luke unconscious.

Luke wakes up next to Danny in the woods with a campfire. Danny tells Luke that Aliens called "elders" have been selling earth's natural resources for decades. They find Klyle held hostage by a man with a gun, and to their horror, see Klyle shot dead by his captor. The brothers drive out to a Taco Gary's, and meet Jason and Tiago there. A tall alien with glowing eyes takes them on a drive and explains that their galactic super race is interested in earth because of oil, since all planets in the galaxy run on this fuel. After stealing oil, they will exterminate all life on earth, with only a small number of earthlings relocated to another planet in the galaxy. Danny is made a part of the coalition, and the elder promises to transfer $27.7 million to his account. But Luke disables the alien elder by shooting his neck with Ketamine.

The brothers go back to Taco Gary's, and Danny gives Luke a ticket for the spaceship transporting passengers to the new Earth 2.0. Jason and Tiago arrive there, and shoot Danny dead. Just as Allison and Luke enter the spaceship, Tiago shoots at Luke but an elder stops the bullet and kills both Tiago and Jason. Luke encounters strange creatures on the spaceship as it departs for the new planet.

== Cast ==
- Simon Rex as Danny
- Dustin Milligan as Luke
- Brenda Song as Allison
- Tony Cavalero as Klyle
- Jason Biggs as himself
- Doug Jones as Elder
- Arturo Castro as Tiago
- Christopher Anthony Hill as Christopher "Biggie Smalls" Wallace / The Notorious B.I.G.
- Roderick Bell as Tupac Shakur

== Production ==
In May 2023, it was announced that Rex would star in and executive produce the film. In June 2023, it was announced that Milligan, Song, Cavalero, Biggs, Jones and Castro were cast in the film.

Filming occurred in Waxhaw, North Carolina and Charlotte, North Carolina in June 2023.

== Release ==
Operation Taco Gary's had its world premiere at the Austin Film Festival on October 25, 2024. In February 2025, Archstone Entertainment acquired global distribution rights to the film and launched sales at the European Film Market.

In January 2026, Chroma announced the acquisition of North American rights and set a theatrical release date with Alamo Drafthouse Cinema for February 27, 2026.

== Reception ==
On the review aggregator website Rotten Tomatoes, 60% of 10 critics' reviews are positive.
