= Little Sister (2010 film) =

Cinderella Moon
- aka Little Sister
- Directed by: Richard Bowen
- Written by: Richard Bowen
- Produced by: Richard Bowen; Barbie Tung; Tristan Whalley
- Starring: Brenda Song
- Cinematography: Terry Stacey
- Edited by: Lisa Cheek
- Music by: Robert Miller
- Distributed by: Miramax Films
- Release date: October 2010 (Doha Tribeca Film Festival)
- Running time: 96 Minutes
- Countries: China; United States
- Languages: English; Mandarin

Cinderella Moon, originally Little Sister, is a 2010 American family-drama written and directed by Richard Bowen. The film is distributed by the independent film company, Goalpost Productions and the film's title was presented at the 2010 Cannes Film Festival. The film stars Brenda Song and mainly features a Chinese cast. In addition, was shot in Yunnan Province, China. The film is based on the earliest telling of the Cinderella story, from ancient China.

== Plot ==
In ancient China, Mei Mei’s mother dies not long after she is born. As she grows up, her father dies while fishing and Mei Mei is left in the hands of her harsh stepmother. The stepmother takes and sells the pottery intended for Mei Mei’s dowry – all that Mei Mei has is the shoes her mother left her, which have magical powers. The Moon then stops in the sky and will no longer move. Mei Mei believes it is in sympathy with the way she is being treated. The young prince king fears that this will cause the world to end. The stepmother plans to marry Mei Mei off to the merchant’s son but Mei Mei defies this and enters the dance being held before the prince king. There the magic of the slippers causes her to fly through the air. The prince immediately becomes captivated by her. After she leaves one of the shoes behind, he sets out through the land to find her. However, this makes the stepmother even more determined to subjugate Mei Mei.

== Cast ==
- Brenda Song as Storyteller
- Xiao Min as Mei Mei
- Zuohui Tang as Astronomer
- Zhang Zhengyuan as Eunuch
- Qiu Lin as Shaman
- Peng Chan as Dowager

== Production ==
Little Sister was filmed in Yunnan Province, China in 2009. The film's title was presented at the 2010 Cannes Film Festival and is currently in post-production.
