= Special Delivery (2008 film) =

- Theatrical film poster
- Written by: Matt Dearborn
- Directed by: Michael M. Scott
- Starring: Brenda Song; Lisa Edelstein; Robert Gant
- Theme music composer: Joseph Magee
- Country of origin: United States
- Original language: English

Production
- Producers: Francis Conway; Michael D. Jacobs Fernando Szew
- Cinematography: Michael M. Scott
- Editor: John Gilbert
- Running time: 111 minutes
- Budget: $20 million

Original release
- Network: Lifetime Movie Network
- Release: September 1, 2008

Special Delivery is a 2008 television film distributed by MarVista Entertainment. The film first aired on September 1, 2008 in the United Kingdom on Sky Movies and on December 21, 2008 in the United States. The lead characters in the film are played by Brenda Song and Lisa Edelstein. Robert Gant also stars. The film aired on the Diva TV network in the summer of 2010 and was available for the international marketplace in the fall of 2009. The film was released on DVD internationally on February 13, 2009.

== Production ==
Most of the film was shot in Oahu, Hawaii. The production company, Special Delivery LLC, is based at Hawaii Media Inc. in Halawa Valley. The film was the first by the Island Film Group and some of the crew were locals. Producer Francis Conway describes Special Delivery as a "Midnight Run-style action-comedy". The film was distributed by MarVista Entertainment. The filming locations included the John A. Burns School of Medicine in Oahu, Hawaii. Some students and locals got extra parts in the film.

MarVista's president, Michael D. Jacobs, and the company's CEO, Fernando Szew, served as executive producers. Marc Lorber, MarVista's senior VP of production, and Sue Reiner, the company's head of television, served as co-executive producers alongside Island Film Group's Ricardo S. Galindez and Roy J. Tjioe. Michael Scott directed the movie from a script written by Matt Dearborn, whose credits include Beyond the Break, Beverly Hills, 90210 and the Disney Channel series Even Stevens. The film was shot in four weeks, according to Song.

== Premise ==
Song has stated,

"It also stars Lisa Edelstein from House and Robert Grant [sic], who's on Queer as Folk. It's a great film - she's a courier, a special courier, and she has a job with a businessman in China, (and) he has something that he wants her to deliver, and it's me, "Song explains." She has to deliver me to my mom in Hawaii. There's a whole lot of twists and turns. I can’t say too much about it, but let's say that my dad, he hasn’t been completely honest, and there's some people after us. "It's fun; it's a movie about forgiveness, whether it's forgiving yourself or a friend or a parent, and it kind of shows two versions of that, which means her story and mine."

The entire film was shot at 16 locations in Oahu, including Kahala, Waikiki, Chinatown, North Shore, Turtle Bay Resort. Honolulu Airport, a nightclub, hospital, and several street scenes.

== Plot ==
The film centers on Alice Cantwell and Maxine Carter. Maxine is the best-connected bond courier working in the Pacific Rim. Maxine is constantly on the move and is always traveling, and likes to keep it that way, ever since she watched her young child, Penny, die in a terrible car accident. Maxine's current delivery is Alice, the troubled and emotionally struggling daughter of one of China's richest businessmen. After a bitter and twisted custody battle, Alice is headed to Hawaii to live with her mother. But almost as soon as they land on US soil, Maxine senses things are not right. She soon figures out that Alice's father is in trouble with the Chinese government and his daughter may not be the only thing he is trying to smuggle into America. With danger around every corner, it's up to Max to deliver Alice safe and sound to her mother's home. The only problem is the longer Alice and Maxine spend together, the more Maxine starts to wonder what's worse, the bad guys after Alice or Alice's bad attitude towards life.

== Cast ==
- Brenda Song - Alice Marie Cantwell
- Lisa Edelstein - Maxine Carter
- Robert Gant - Nate
- Julie Ow - Naomi
- Michael Cowell - Bill Devane
- Stan Egi - Danny Wong
- Dann Seki - Dawson
- Ned Van Zandt - Alan Cantwell
- Milan Tresnak - Rudd Weathers
- Blade Rogers - Dex
- Alana Brennan - Fran
- Bonnie Berger - Flight Attendant
- Brock Little - Darius
- Rob Duval - Keith
- Travis Rose - Bouncer
- Paul T. Mitri - Ivan
- Kristian Peterson - Valet Guy
- Jennifer MacWilliams - Dr. Clare
- Walter Klenhard - Randy
- Matt Goldstein - Passenger Asleep On Plane

== Release ==
The film's full-length trailer was released on November 17, 2008. The film has aired on Sky Movies in the UK and the Lifetime Movie Network in the United States in December 2008. The film was available for the international marketplace in the fall. The UK premiere averaged over 4 million, the highest ever for a movie on Sky Movies. The film aired on Sky Movies's comedy channel on July 8, 2009 and previously aired on BBC One in March 2009. The film additionally had a limited theatrical release in several European countries and was featured in many film festivals.

=== Critical reception ===
The film generally received mixed reviews. Sky Movies have given the film a low rating and a moderately negative review. The film's rating in the United Kingdom on Sky Movies was 12A, which means that the film is suitable for children aged 12 years old and older. The film was aired at night because of the rating. In July 2009, the film's rating changed to PG, which means that general viewing may be unsuitable for young children. The Daily Record called the film a very "likeable comedy". The film received a positive review from the site, Comic films.

The reviewer said: "the movie is well filmed and it succeeds in hooking audience attention from within the first few seconds. Clues and information are offered effectively. However the reviewer said certain details of the resolution of the twisting and turning story seem to be rushed, unexplained or lacking. Nonetheless the reviewer said "this is a pleasant night's viewing and strong performances coupled with good direction by Michael Scott create a movie of much higher quality than many other television movies of a similar genre." The reviewer also praised the lead performers in the film, Brenda Song and Lisa Edelstein saying Edelstein brings her usual sintilating skill to the role, immediately causing the character to be both engaging and believably natural. The reviewer also said, Song who sings some of the soundtrack, not only adds to the amusing aspects of the movie, she also succeeds in allowing her bratty character to become both likeable and understandable. They also gave the supporting cast a positive review.

The Australian publication, "Urban CineFilm" said: "Engaging from the start, Special Delivery introduces us to Max (Lisa Edelstein) as the resourceful courier, who was once a high flying lawyer ... and married ... and a mother ... We start picking up the pieces that make up the bigger picture of Max and our interest is piqued. When she takes on the job of escorting a spoilt 14-year-old (Brenda Song) from Macau to Hawaii, the generation gap conflict provides plenty of sparks, but a sense of danger is also introduced, making it an edgy trip. Brenda Song is terrific as the spoilt brat on a journey that will sober her up and Edelstein is feisty and likeable (and reminiscent of Jennifer Connelly) as the no-nonsense Max - with demons to keep at bay. The screenplay has a sense of fun, which director Michael Scott translates well onto the screen, so the action and tension is spiced with hip humour, based on character as well as situation. Max does her job, delivering Alice to her mother - in more ways than she anticipated.

Other than one logic-defying scene, the film offers great escapist entertainment and interesting characters for whom we come to care. The locations are great, too."

== Marketing ==
The film's full-length trailer was released in the internet on November 25, 2008. It was featured in the Living Proof DVD. The film's tagline, which is also featured in the poster is "Danger. Expected."

=== Soundtrack ===
The soundtrack of Special Delivery was released exclusively under the Universal Music Group on August 11, 2008. The soundtrack featured tracks from the Velvet Underground, Cheap Trick, David Bowie and a minor track by Brenda Song. The hit single, "4ever" by Australian girl band, The Veronicas was featured in the film's promotional commercials.

Track listing
No.	Title	Artist	Length
1.	"Life Goes By" (Scott Spock)	Brenda Song	2:06
2.	"You Wish!" (Lauren Christy, Larry Cooper)	Molly M	3:05
3.	"Everything I'm Not"" (Jay Condiotti, Danielle McKee, Eddie Galan, Andrew Lane)	The Veronicas	4:01
4.	"Leave Me Alone" (Jimmy Robertson Landry)	The Veronicas	3:35
5.	"Hook Me Up" (Jessica Origliasso)	The Veronicas	3:11
6.	"Welcome To The Party" (Molly Mostek)	Molly M	5:46
7.	"You Are Part Of Everything" (Josh Kelley)	Josh Kelley	3:27
8.	"Day In The Sun" (Kevin Savigar, David Nicholas, Michael Stangel)	Angie Hilton	3:42
9.	"Unstoppable" (Joel Wachbrit, Michael Sokolis)	Buddah Belly	2:20
10.	"Little Wonder" (Joe Faraci)	David Bowie	3:22
11.	"No Way" (Kelly Ogden, Luis Cabezas)	Velvet Underground	4:39
12.	"Through My Eyes" (David Osborne)	Autumn's Descent	2:24
13.	"Symphony No. 9: Ode To Joy" (Beethoven)	Beethoven	4:16
14.	"Nothing" (Hannah Jenson)	Cheap Trick	3:09
15.	"Drive" (Darren Reynolds)	The Humidiflyers	4:26
16.	"Let Me Fall" (Joe Faraci)	Faraci	4:15
17.	"Dale Que Dale" (Rafael Torres, Edgard E. Jaude, Michael Garcia)	Mikeyton	4:47
18.	"Don't Leave" (Daniel Cage)	Daniel Cage	3:45
19.	"Shiver" (Genzo, Cheryl Yie, Julian Medeiros)	Cheryl Yie	3:04
20.	"Soft Place To Fall" (Michael Maslin, Paul Gordon)	Joelle James	3:66
21.	"Your Ride" (Nadia Fay, Jay Condiotti)	Girls Love Shoes	4:00
22.	"Fragile Tough Girl" (Jo Davidson)	Jo Davidson	3:01
23.	"Pictures of You" (Jeffrey Mark Blue)	The Last Goodnight	4:00

== DVD ==
Film	Region 1	Discs	Extras	Countries
Special Delivery	February 13, 2009	1	Several bonus features such as an interview with Song and Edelstein, a sneak peek of Lifetime's Living Proof, an interview with the leading stars of the film. In addition, film's promotional poster is featured in the DVD and the trailers of Living Proof and Custody.	The USA, Canada, Australia, United Kingdom and New Zealand
