= Girlfriends' Guide to Divorce =

American drama television series

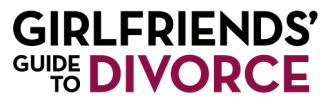
- Also known as: Girlfriends' Guide to Freedom (season 3); Girlfriends' Guide to Bossing Up (season 4); Girlfriends' Guide to Ever After (season 5)
- Based on: Girlfriends' Guides series by Vicki Iovine
- Developed by: Marti Noxon
- Starring: Lisa Edelstein; Beau Garrett; Necar Zadegan; Paul Adelstein; Janeane Garofalo; Alanna Ubach; Retta
- Composer: Robert Duncan
- Country of origin: United States
- Original language: English
- No. of seasons: 5
- No. of episodes: 45 (list of episodes)

Production
- Executive producers: Marti Noxon; Vicki Iovine; Meryl Poster; Robert Duncan McNeill; Liz Kruger; Craig Shapiro
- Cinematography: Florian Ballhaus (pilot only); Scott Williams
- Camera setup: Single-camera
- Running time: 45 minutes
- Production companies: Tiny Pyro Productions; Universal Cable Productions

Original release
- Network: Bravo
- Release: December 2, 2014 – July 19, 2018

Related
- The 45 Rules of Divorce - Arabic adaptation

Girlfriends' Guide to Divorce (also known as Girlfriends' Guide to Freedom in season 3, Girlfriends' Guide to Bossing Up in season 4, and Girlfriends' Guide to Ever After in season 5) is an American comedy-drama television series developed by Marti Noxon for the American cable network Bravo. Based on the Girlfriends' Guides book series by Vicki Iovine, the series revolves around Abby McCarthy, a self-help author who finds solace in new friends and adventures as she faces an impending divorce. Lisa Edelstein portrays the main character, Abby. Beau Garrett and Necar Zadegan co-star. Janeane Garofalo was part of the main cast for the first seven episodes of season 1 before departing the cast. She was replaced in episode 8 with Alanna Ubach. Paul Adelstein co-starred as a main cast member for the first two seasons, before being reduced to a recurring character for the third and fifth seasons. Retta recurred during the show's second season before being promoted to the main cast at the start of season 3.

Produced by Universal Cable Productions, it is the first original scripted series for Bravo. A 13-episode first season was ordered by the network, which premiered on December 2, 2014. The show debuted to 1.04 million viewers. Critical reception for the series has initially been generally positive, with particular praise towards Edelstein's performance and the series' quality over the reality series on Bravo. The show was eventually renewed for a second season, which premiered on December 1, 2015. On April 13, 2016, it was announced that Bravo had renewed the show for a third, fourth and fifth season. On August 5, 2016, it was announced that the fifth season would be the show's last.

== Cast ==
=== Main ===
- Lisa Edelstein as Abby McCarthy, a self-help book author in her early 40s in Los Angeles. Her marriage has recently ended, throwing both her personal and professional lives into serious disarray.
- Beau Garrett as Phoebe Conte, a recent divorcée and former model. Up until now she has been a typical free spirit but she is now seeking a more stable life.
- Necar Zadegan as Delia Banai, a divorce attorney who represents Abby in her divorce. She struggles with career and personal life balance.
- Alanna Ubach as Jo Hernandez-Frumpkis, Abby's best friend from college who comes to live with her in LA. She is recently separated from her husband after finding out he had a second family.
- Paul Adelstein as Jake Novak, Abby's husband from whom she is recently separated. He is a director with a limited amount of success and has up until now lived in Abby's shadow. (seasons 1–2; recurring seasons 3 & 5)
- Janeane Garofalo as Lyla Straley, Abby's friend, a divorcée and entertainment lawyer. A bitter custody battle with her ex causes her to flee California for Portland in the middle of season 1. (season 1, episodes 1–7)
- Retta as Barbara Sawyer, Abby's co-worker at SheShe, who later becomes her business partner. (seasons 3–5; recurring season 2)

=== Recurring ===
- Conner Dwelly as Lilly, Abby's daughter
- Dylan Schombing as Charlie, Abby's son
- Julianna Guill as Becca Riley, Jake's new girlfriend and a successful actress on a CW show
- Patrick Heusinger as Max McCarthy, Abby's brother
- J. August Richards as Ford, husband to Abby's brother
- Warren Christie as Will, Abby's new boyfriend
- Brian Markinson as Albert, Delia's boss and long-time fling. Delia has an affair with him while engaged to Gordon
- Matthew Glave as Gordon Beech, Delia's client with whom she starts an affair
- Brandon Jay McLaren as Marco, Phoebe's love interest
- Aaron Staton as JD, Phoebe's love interest
- Jean Smart as Katherine Miller, Abby's editor
- Mark Valley as Dr. Harris, Abby's love interest
- Maury Sterling as Rob Frumpkis, Jo's ex-husband
- Will Kemp as Scott, the vegan confectioner at Jo's bakery
- Megan Hilty as Charlene, Frumpkis' new girlfriend
- Charles Mesure as Ralf, Phoebe's ex-husband
- James Lesure as Mike Brady, Charlie's baseball coach
- Daisy Betts as Gemma
- Alison Thornton as Zooey Hernandez Frumpkis
- Steve Talley as Tony, Phoebe's brother

=== Guest ===
- Carrie Fisher as Cat
- Suke Kaiser as Kori Wingo, Phoebe's former boss
- Bernadette Peters as Annie
- Laverne Cox as Adele Northrop
- Victor Webster as Carl, a male escort who Abby spends the night talking to
- Barry Bostwick as George, Abby's dad
- Lesley Ann Warren as Dina, Abby's mom
- Malcolm Jamal Warner as Darrell
- Kathie Lee Gifford as herself
- Hoda Kotb as herself
- Kyle Richards as herself
- Jessica Clark as Merete
- Denise Richards as Temple Hampton, Will's new girlfriend
- Talia Shire as Meryl Frumpkis, Jo's mother-in-law

== Episodes ==
Season	Episodes	Originally released	
Season	Episodes	First released	Last released
1	13	December 2, 2014	February 24, 2015
2	13	December 1, 2015	February 23, 2016
3	7	January 11, 2017	February 22, 2017
4	6	August 17, 2017	September 21, 2017
5	6	June 14, 2018	July 19, 2018

== Reception ==
=== Critical response ===
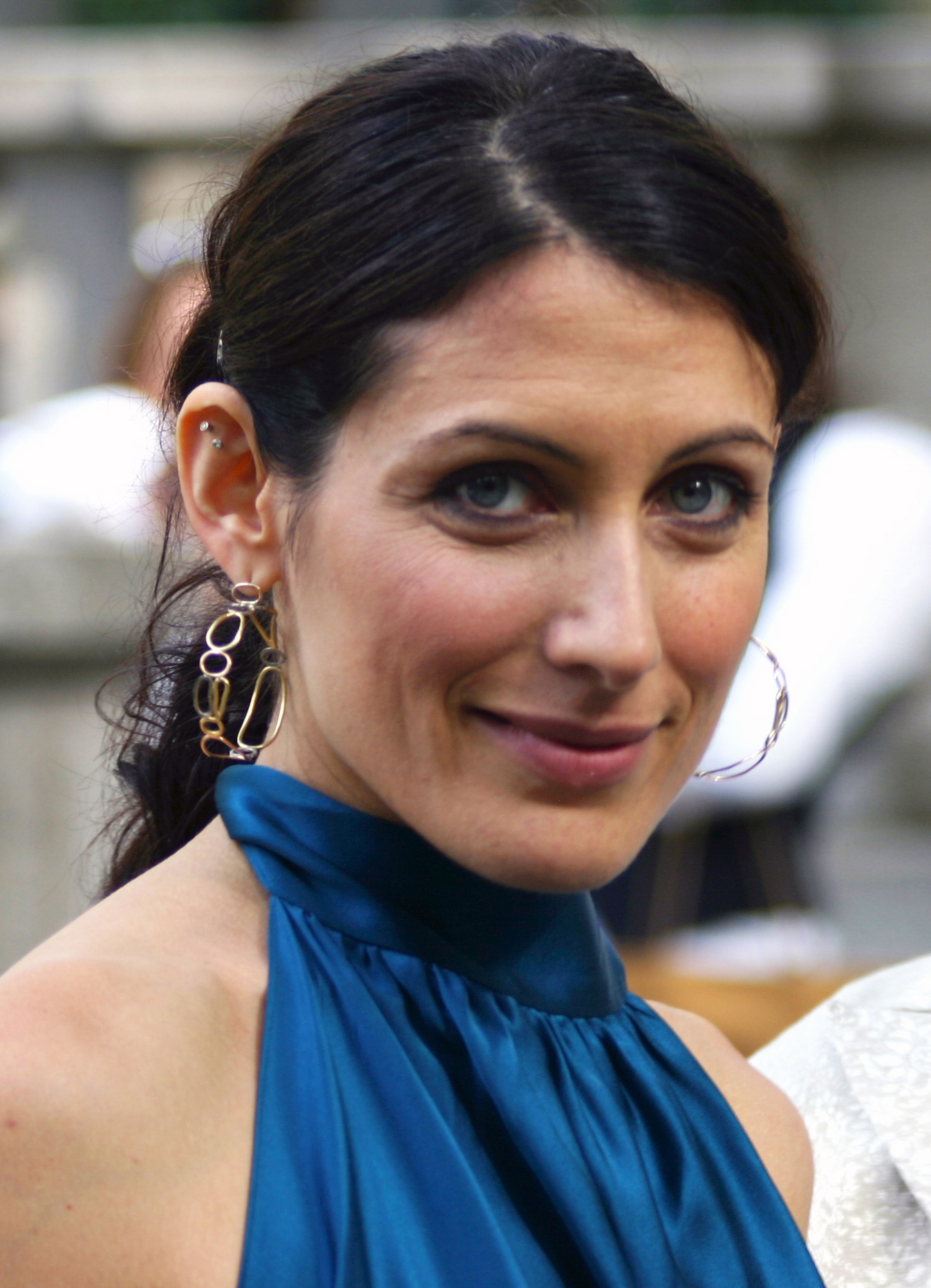
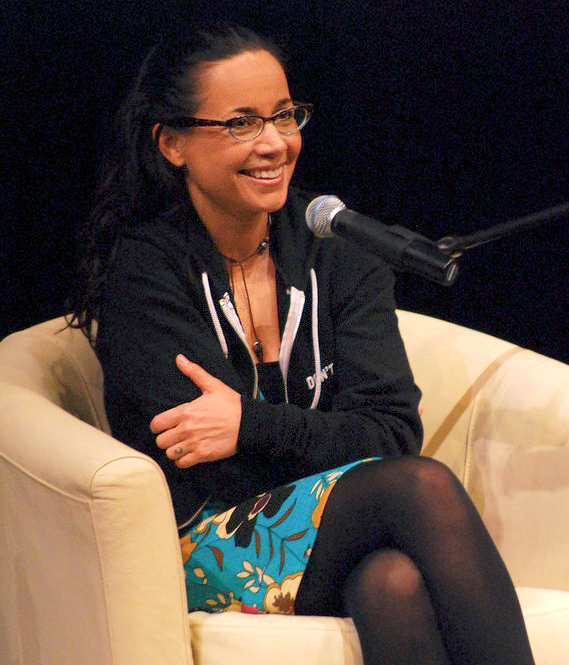
Edelstein and Garofalo's performances were praised by the critics.

Girlfriends' Guide to Divorce was met with generally positive reviews from television critics. At Metacritic, which assigns a weighted mean rating out of 100 to reviews from critics, the series received an average score of 69, based on 21 reviews. Lori Rackl of Chicago Sun-Times gave the episode a 4 star rating (out of 4 stars), calling it "a sometimes hilarious, sometimes heartbreaking story about an L.A.-based self-help author" and added that the first two episodes "reveal a much more nuanced, poignant tale, punctuated by some genuinely funny scenes." LaToya Ferguson of The A.V. Club gave the series a grade of "A−", calling it "a very solid drama" that should be on HBO or Showtime. Ferguson also praised the characters and the series's messiness, writing "Visually, it's almost flawless (there's one obvious green-screen moment in the pilot, but it's not Ringer level), but every character here is deeply flawed." Los Angeles Times's Mary McNamara lauded the series' cast's portrayal of the characters and deemed the series "smartly acted, crisply written and willing to address all manner of issues — marriage, betrayal, family economics, friendship, even the pitfalls of public domesticity — in gratifyingly complex ways." Brian Lowry, writing for Variety, applauded the series' cast and material, noting how it sticks to the network's demographic while maintaining a level of quality.

Gail Pennington of St. Louis Post-Dispatch called the series "a smart, solid examination of just how messy relationships are and how hard it is to make them work." Slate's Willa Paskin highlighted Edelstein's portrayal of the lead character, describing her as "very well cast, both commanding and nurturing enough to seem like the ideal advice-giver" and noted that the series has "a satisfying and complex take on social dynamics in friendship and romance." Alessandra Stanley of The New York Times praised Edelstein and Garofalo as "one reason" the show is entertaining and found the comic side of the series "a lot more fun." Time's writer James Poniewozik praised the writing and Edelstein's "sympathetic" performance, noting that the latter "grounds a show that often otherwise plays like young-adult fiction for actual adults." However, Poniewozik opined that "there's one lesson Girlfriends’ Guide to Divorce has (over)learned from its Bravo peers: that there's no reality so compelling that it can’t be sweetened with a little Photoshop." David Hinckley, writing for the New York Daily News, highlighted the series' best moments as those showing the messy side of marital discourse while heralding Edelstein's performance as "memorably moving." Margaret Lyons of Vulture was critical of the several aspects of the series, including the characters Abby and Lyla's attitude on giving their spouses child support, but found the series to be its best "at its nastiest."

=== Ratings ===
No. in		Episode title	Air date	Time slot (EST)	18–49 demo rating	Viewership (millions)	Ref
series	season	Episode title	Air date	Time slot (EST)	18–49 demo rating	Viewership (millions)	Ref
1	1	Rule No. 23: Never Lie to the Kids	December 2, 2014	Tuesdays; 10:00 P.M.	0.5	1.04	
2	2	Rule No. 174: Never Trust Anyone Who Charges By the Hour	December 9, 2014	Tuesdays; 10:00 P.M.	0.4	0.85	
3	3	Rule No. 47: Always Take Advantage of "Me" Time	December 16, 2014	Tuesdays; 10:00 P.M.	0.3	0.70	
4	4	Rule No. 426: Fantasyland: A Great Place to Visit	December 23, 2014	Tuesdays; 10:00 P.M.	0.3	0.77	
5	5	Rule No. 21: Leave Childishness to Children	December 30, 2014	Tuesdays; 10:00 P.M.	0.4	0.87	
6	6	Rule No 33: When in Doubt, Run Away	January 6, 2015	Tuesdays; 10:00 P.M.	0.4	0.87	
7	7	Rule No. 67: Don't Kill the Princess	January 13, 2015	Tuesdays; 10:00 P.M.	0.4	0.77	
8	8	Rule No. 17: Ask the Answer Lady	January 20, 2015	Tuesdays; 10:00 P.M.	0.3	0.69	
9	9	Rule No. 32: F-You, Rob Frumpkis	January 27, 2015	Tuesdays; 10:00 P.M.	0.4	0.91	
10	10	Rule No. 3: Don't Stand in the Doorway	February 3, 2015	Tuesdays; 10:00 P.M.	0.3	0.74	
11	11	Rule No. 46: Keep the Holidays Low Key	February 10, 2015	Tuesdays; 10:00 P.M.	0.4	0.83	
12	12	Rule No. 92: Don't Do the Crime If You Can't Do the Time	February 17, 2015	Tuesdays; 10:00 P.M.	0.4	0.74	
13	13	Rule No. 101: Know When It's Time to Move On	February 24, 2015	Tuesdays; 10:00 P.M.	0.3	0.79	

== Arabic adaptation ==
In October 2021, it was announced that MBC Group was developing their own version of the American series, Girlfriends' Guide to Divorce with Sally Wally along with their production company, S Productions in partnership with NBCUniversal Formats. The series was greenlit for a 45-episodes of fifth and final season which premiered on 21 November 2021 on MBC 4, Shahid VIP & S Productions collaborate on their first comedy-drama series: The 45 Rules of Divorce.

== Broadcast ==
Girlfriends' Guide to Divorce premiered in the United States on Bravo on December 2, 2014, in Canada on Slice on January 9, 2015, and in the United Kingdom on Lifetime UK on September 15, 2015.

=== Home media and streaming ===
The first season was released on DVD in region 1 on October 13, 2015. On November 1, 2015 season 1 of Girlfriends' Guide to Divorce became available to stream in the US for Netflix subscribers. The show is also available from electronic sell-through platforms such as iTunes, Amazon Instant Video, and Vudu.
