= Robert Gant =

American actor (born 1968)

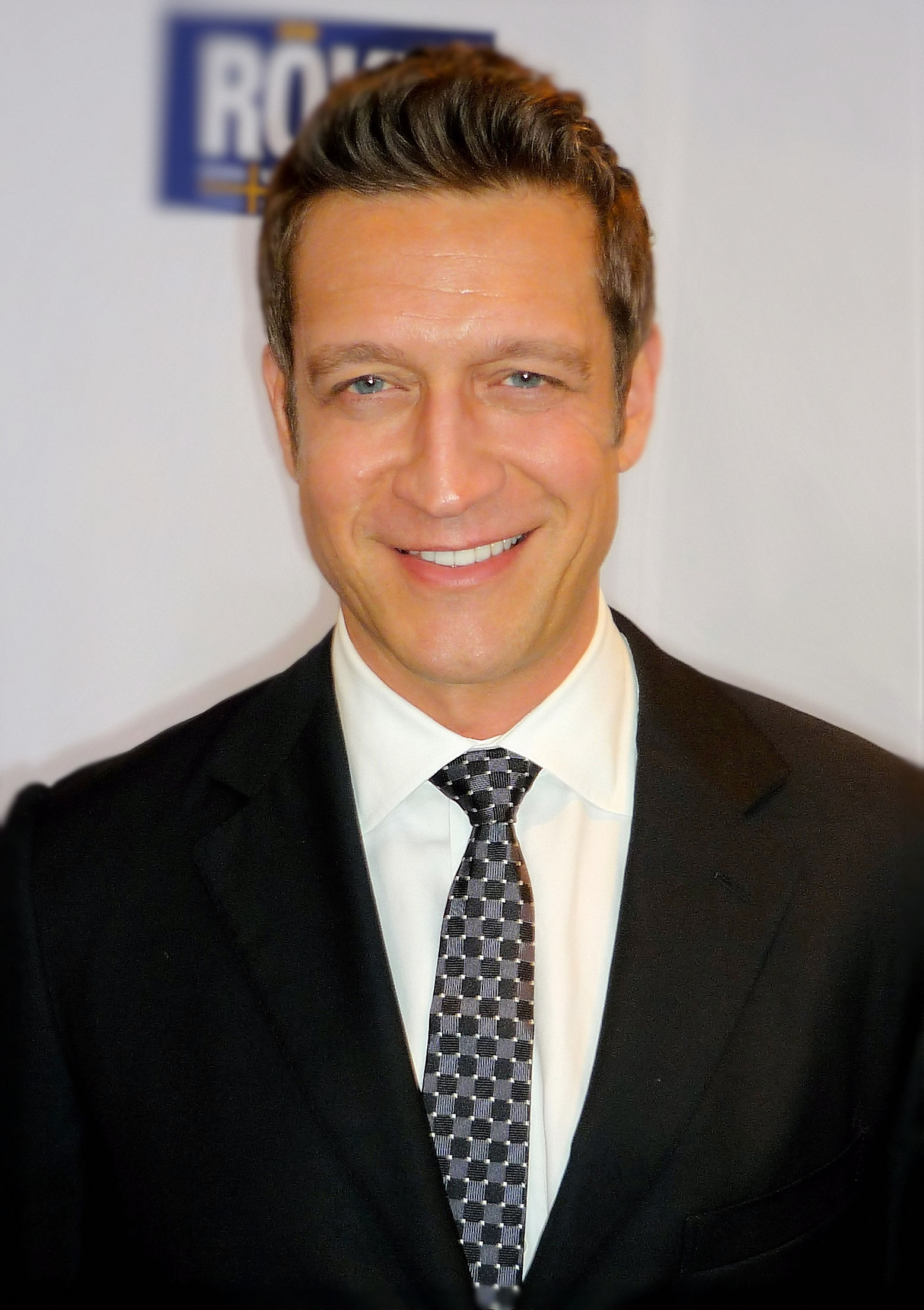
- Gant in 2009
- Born: Robert John Gonzalez; July 13, 1968 (age 58); Tampa, Florida, U.S.
- Education: Georgetown University; University of Pennsylvania
- Occupations: Actor; producer; lawyer
- Years active: 1994–present

Robert Gant (born Robert John Gonzalez; July 13, 1968) is an American actor. He is best known for his role as Ben Bruckner on the Showtime series Queer as Folk.

== Early life and education ==
Robert Gant was born as Robert Gonzalez in Tampa, Florida. His father is of Spanish, Cuban and Italian descent, while his mother is of Irish and English descent. At age ten, Gant began acting in television commercials in Florida and became a member of the Screen Actors Guild at the age of eleven.

Gant studied tap and jazz dance with the American Musical Theatre Company in Tampa, Florida. He performed a soft-shoe routine at MacDill Air Force Base with comedian Bob Hope as part of Hope's USO tour. He attended George D. Chamberlain High School and graduated in 1986.

While attending the University of Pennsylvania, Gant majored in English literature with both Shakespeare and poetry concentrations. At Penn, he was also a performing member of the slightly outlandish, artistically driven all-male a cappella group Pennsylvania Six-5000 and, as part of the school's acting group Quadramics, played such roles as the sadistic dentist in Little Shop of Horrors . He attended the Georgetown University Law Center, where he obtained his Juris Doctor in 1993. Gant was also a member of the Georgetown Gilbert & Sullivan Society, performing in a number of its productions. Gant started a six-man a cappella group, The MetroGnomes, which performed in venues around Washington, D.C.

Gant accepted a position with the Los Angeles office of Chicago-headquartered international law firm Baker McKenzie. When the firm closed its Los Angeles office shortly thereafter, Gant decided to pursue acting and performing.

== Career ==
From 2002 to 2005, Gant portrayed Professor Ben Bruckner in Showtime's television series Queer as Folk. His character was married in the first legal gay marriage portrayed on American television.

In 2004, Gant starred in the short film Billy's Dad is a Fudgepacker, an homage to 1950s educational films, which premiered at the Sundance Film Festival. In 2005, Gant was a series regular in the BBC 3-produced drama Personal Affairs, set in London's financial sector and filmed on location in both London and Scotland. Gant was the sole American in an otherwise all-British cast.

Gant was a producing partner in the production company Mythgarden. Its 2007 feature film Save Me, a drama set against the backdrop of an ex-gay ministry, stars Gant along with Judith Light and Chad Allen and premiered at the Sundance Film Festival. He also co-produced, co-wrote, and starred in the Netflix-distributed period drama Milada, the true story of Czech politician Milada Horáková, who was executed by the Communist government in 1950.

Gant portrayed television's first gay spy in the film, Kiss Me Deadly, which was shot on location in New Zealand. Gant has portrayed Melissa Benoist's Kryptonian father Zor-El on Supergirl, Todd Crimsen on the Netflix series 13 Reasons Why, and Jim Hunter on The Fosters and its spin-off series Good Trouble. Prior to Queer as Folk, Gant recurred as Principal Calvin Krupps in Ryan Murphy's first television series, Popular, and a recurring role as Caroline's boyfriend Trevor in Caroline in the City.

Gant has had guest roles on the television show Friends, where he played one of two men Phoebe was dating simultaneously. The other man Phoebe dates was played by recurring Queer as Folk actor, Matt Battaglia. Gant guest starred in Melrose Place, Becker, several CSI-related shows, Caroline in the City, and Criminal Minds. In 2013, he portrayed Captain Robert Norton in Dead Space 3, the third installment in the Dead Space video game series released by Electronic Arts.

== Personal life ==
In an interview published by The Advocate magazine, Gant came out as gay in 2002.

Gant supports such organizations as Services & Advocacy for LGBT Elders (SAGE) and Gay & Lesbian Elder Housing (GLEH).

== Partial filmography ==
Film

Year	Title	Role	Notes
1996	Cityscrapes: Los Angeles	Policeman B	
1996	Jane Street	Jay	
1997	Hercules		Video reference cast
1999	Teaching Mrs. Tingle	Professor	
1999	The Contract	Gene Collins	
2002	Fits and Starts	Ian	
2004	Marie and Bruce	Bartender	
2004	Billy's Dad Is a Fudge-Packer!	Billy's Dad	Short
2007	Save Me	Scott	Also producer
2007	Live!	Casting Director	
2012	Joshua Tree, 1951: A Portrait of James Dean	Ian	
2016	Love Is All You Need?	Pete Santilli	
2016	The Thinning	Vince Davi	
2017	A Million Happy Nows	Dr. Hansen	
2017	Milada	Bohuslav Horák	Also writer and producer
2021	The Map of Tiny Perfect Things	Weatherman Dave	
2023	To Catch a Killer	Jimmy Kittridge (uncredited)	

Television

Year	Title	Role	Notes
1994	Ellen	Dr. Garber	Episode: "The Dentist"
1994	My So-Called Life	Gunther	Episode: "Pressure"
1994	Melrose Place	Waiter	Episode: "Just Say No"
1995	My Wildest Dreams	Stewart	Episode: "Sister's Mister"
1995	Step by Step	Fireman	Episode: "The Girls and a Baby"
1996	High Tide	Mason	Episode: "Old Friends"
1996	Melrose Place	Deputy Tom	Episode: "Moving Violations"
1997	Townies	Guy	Episode: "Things to Do in Gloucester When You Are Dead"
1997	Life with Roger	Rod Davis	Episode: "The Boxer Rebellion"
1997	Friends	Jason	Episode: "The One with Ross's Thing"
1997	Hangin' with Mr. Cooper	Bartender	Episode: "Party, Party"
1997	Silk Stalkings	Kevin	Episode: "Night of the Parrot"
1997	Head Over Heels	Blake	Episode: "Hot Guy"
1997	Night Stand	Frank Thatcher	Episode: "Leave Your Job or I'm Leaving You"
1997–98	Caroline in the City	Trevor	9 episodes
1998	Style & Substance	Matthew	Episode: "Terry, We Hardly Knew Ye"
1998	Fantasy Island	Dave Sullivan	Episode: "Estrogen"
1999	Becker	Doug	Episode: "Cyrano De-Beckerac"
1999	Rude Awakening	Jim	Episode: "Abstinence Makes the Heart Grow Fonder"
2000	Linc's	Dr. Brad Wheeler	Episode: "I Just Want to Testify"
2000	Veronica's Closet	Bernie	Episode: "Veronica Sets Josh Up"
2000–01	Popular	Calvin Krupps	11 episodes
2002	V.I.P.	Arthur Goodwin	Episode: "Val Cubed"
2002	Providence	Groom	Episode: "It's Raining Men"
2002–05	Queer as Folk	Prof. Ben Bruckner	55 episodes
2005	The Closer	Julian Carver	Episode: "Batter Up"
2006	Pepper Dennis	Benny Gold	Episode: "Celebrity Twin Could Hang"
2007	CSI: Crime Scene Investigation	Lewis Greyburg	Episode: "Empty Eyes"
2008	Nip/Tuck	Jeff Morris	Episode: "Magda and Jeff"
2008	Kiss Me Deadly	Jacob Keane	Television film
2008	Special Delivery	Nate Spencer	Television film
2009	Rick & Steve: The Happiest Gay Couple in All the World	Mayor Mayer	Voice; Episode: "The Only Straight in the Village"
2009	CSI: NY	Felix Redman	Episode: "Green Piece"
2009	Tracey Ullman's State of the Union	Buzz	Episode: "Fuzzy Cheeks"
2009	Personal Affairs	Rock van Gelder	5 episodes
2009	Castle	Ron Bigby	Episode: "Deep in Death"
2009	CSI: Miami	Lloyd Arrington	Episode: "Hostile Takeover"
2010	Bones	Jason Hendler	Episode: "The Dentist in the Ditch"
2010	Hot in Cleveland	Steve	Episode: "Birthdates"
2010	90210	Dr. Wright	Episode: "Catch Me If You Cannon"
2011	Mike & Molly	Kyle	Episode: "First Valentine's Day"
2011	Happily Divorced	Marc	Episode: "A Kiss Is Just a Kiss"
2011	The Secret Life of the American Teenager	Mr. Martin	Episode: "4-1-1"
2011	My Life As an Experiment	Craig Rolle	Television film
2012	Free Agents	Mark	Episode: "The Kids Are Probably Alright"
2012	Shameless	Greg Garvin	Episode: "Father's Day"
2013	Vegas	Rick Kent	Episode: "From This Day Forward"
2013	NCIS	Mike Dunkel	Episode: "Detour"
2013	Anger Management	Dr. Konner	Episode: "Charlie and the Hot Nerd"
2013	Baby Daddy	Steve	Episode: "Christening"
2013	Sean Saves the World	Chase	Episode: "Date Expectations"
2013–17	The Young and the Restless	David Sherman	16 episodes
2014	The Tomorrow People	Peter MacKenzie	Episode: "The Citadel"; Episode: "Sitting Ducks"
2014	Hit the Floor	Louis Jason	Episode: "Full-Court Press"
2015	Criminal Minds	Miles Tate	Episode: "Lockdown"
2015–16	Supergirl	Zor-El	4 episodes
2016	K.C. Undercover	Vice President Jackson Cleveland	Episode: "Accidents Will Happen"; Episode: "Brainwashed"
2016	Summer of Dreams	Noah Burns	Television film
2016	American Housewife	Tim Donohue	Episode: "Krampus Katie"
2017	Hawaii Five-0	Thomas Stratham	Episode: "Huikau na makau a na lawai'a"
2017–20	13 Reasons Why	Todd Crimsen	6 episodes
2018	The Fosters	Jim Hunter	3 episodes
2018	Wedding of Dreams	Noah Burns	Television film
2019	Why Women Kill	Dale Clark	Episode: "You Had Me at Homicide"; Episode: "Practically Lethal in Every Way"
2019	All Rise	Daniel Fox	Episode: "Maricela and the Desert"
2019–24	Good Trouble	Jim Hunter	5 episodes
2021	NCIS: Los Angeles	Ron Lewis	Episode: "A Fait Accompli"
2023	Station 19	Matt	Episode: "All These Things That I've Done"

Stage
