= Requiem (1995 film) =

- Directed by: Elizabeth Sung
- Written by: Peter Tulipan
- Produced by: Mel M. Metcalfe III
- Starring: Tamlyn Tomita; Chris Tashima; Brenda Song; Binh Nguyen
- Cinematography: Lawrence Schweich
- Edited by: Clarinda Wong
- Music by: Christopher Franke; Joel Iwataki
- Distributed by: AFI
- Release date: 1995
- Running time: 30 minutes
- Country: United States
- Language: English

Requiem is a 1995 narrative short film directed by actress Elizabeth Sung, made in the American Film Institute's Directing Workshop for Women. Based on Sung's childhood in Hong Kong and her journey to New York City as a ballet student, it tells the story of a struggling dancer who loses a brother to AIDS.

The film won a CINE Golden Eagle Award in 1996.

== Premise ==
A waitress/dancer remembers her loving brother and their bittersweet childhood in Hong Kong.

== Cast ==
- Tamlyn Tomita as Fong
- Chris Tashima as Philip
- Brenda Song as Young Fong
- Binh Nguyen as Young Philip
- Dana Lee as Father
- Elizabeth Sung as Mother
- Mary Chen as Hong Kong Teacher
- Revel Paul as New York Teacher
- Malcolm Moorman as Boyfriend
