= Kiss Me Deadly (2008 film) =

2008 American made-for-television action–thriller film

- DVD cover
- Written by: George Schenck; Frank Cardea
- Directed by: Ron Oliver
- Starring: Robert Gant; Shannen Doherty; Fraser Brown; John Rhys-Davies; Nathan Whitaker; Katherine Kennard
- Music by: Claude Foisy
- Country of origin: United States
- Original language: English

Production
- Executive producers: Thomas Becker; Paul Colichman; Thomas Fischer
- Producers: Grant Bradley; Steve Jarchow; Jeff Schenck
- Cinematography: Neil Cervin
- Editor: Eva Contis
- Running time: 87 minutes

Original release
- Network: here!’s website
- Release: May 2008

Kiss Me Deadly (aka Kiss Me Deadly: A Jacob Keane Assignment and The Delphi Effect) is a 2008 American made-for-television action–thriller film directed by Ron Oliver. It was written by Frank Cardea and George Schenck, co-showrunners of NCIS. The movie stars Robert Gant, Shannen Doherty, Fraser Brown, John Rhys-Davies, Nathan Whitaker and Katherine Kennard. It was produced by Here! Films and premiered in May 2008, on demand at here!’s website. It was released on DVD on November 18, 2008.

== Plot ==
The film begins in Germany while the Berlin Wall is still intact, with Marta and Jacob on a secret spy mission that goes horribly wrong. A few days later, after the fall of the wall, they meet their boss Yale in a West Berlin cafe and are given a debriefing, effectively telling them the cold war is over, and their jobs are done. Now the movie fast forwards through the years with a montage of news stories showing the 911 attacks on the World Trade Center, the aftermath of Hurricane Katrina, and ends up at present day where the story picks up. Jacob has retired and is now working as a fashion photographer, living with his young daughter and boyfriend Paulo, in Milan, Italy. He receives an unexpected call from Marta after seventeen years, asking him to pick her up at the train station in Milan. After arriving at the station, he discovers she has amnesia and is being followed by a pair of unsavory looking thugs. Since Marta is suffering from a memory loss and doesn't know why she is being followed by the thugs, or who they work for, Jacob agrees to help her find out why.

== Cast ==
- Robert Gant as Jacob Keane
- Shannen Doherty as Marta
- Fraser Brown as Jared
- John Rhys-Davies as Yale Ericson
- Nathan Whitaker as Paolo
- Katherine Kennard as Kyra
- Alessandra Muir as Julia
- Matthew Sunderland as Vigo
- Alastair Lumsden as Raphael
- Elizabeth Hawthorne as Jilian

== Production notes ==
When the film and cast was originally announced for production, it was supposed to be the first film of what would become a gay spy series for here! According to Robert Gant, "it's up to the here! network, but I think that's what they've been talking about, and the following movies will be even more sexy and exciting". Gant, who is openly gay also said that his character Jacob, who happens to be gay, "represents a role model, of sorts, in the fictitious realm, and having a character like Jacob continues to move us forward; this pushes us to a place we haven't been to before".

== Critical reception ==
A review in the Dutch Cinemagazine implies that the film is a cheap knockoff of The Bourne Identity, where Jason Bourne is also confronted with his secret spy past. They said the dialogue is "cliched and laughable", and the director tries to disguise the "weak screenplay with gimmicks and editing techniques" that don't make the scenes believable. In conclusion, the magazine states the movie doesn't "possess a cast capable of elevating it into an attractive spy film", and calling their acting "downright dull". The LGBT film site CGiii was harsh in their review saying Ron Oliver's directing "is not very good" and the camera work is "sloppy and wobbly", while the "script is a mess".

A review in NewNowNext also wasn't very kind, saying "the action is uneven, and a few of the scenes are so badly shot and edited that they’re downright hilarious". They said the actor's performances "likewise too are unremarkable...Gant seems invested but just isn't much fun to watch, and the same goes for Doherty". In the end, they said the movie might satisfy some viewers "looking for a way to wile away a Sunday afternoon".

== See also ==
- List of made-for-television films with LGBT characters
