= Lisa Edelstein =

American actress (born 1966)

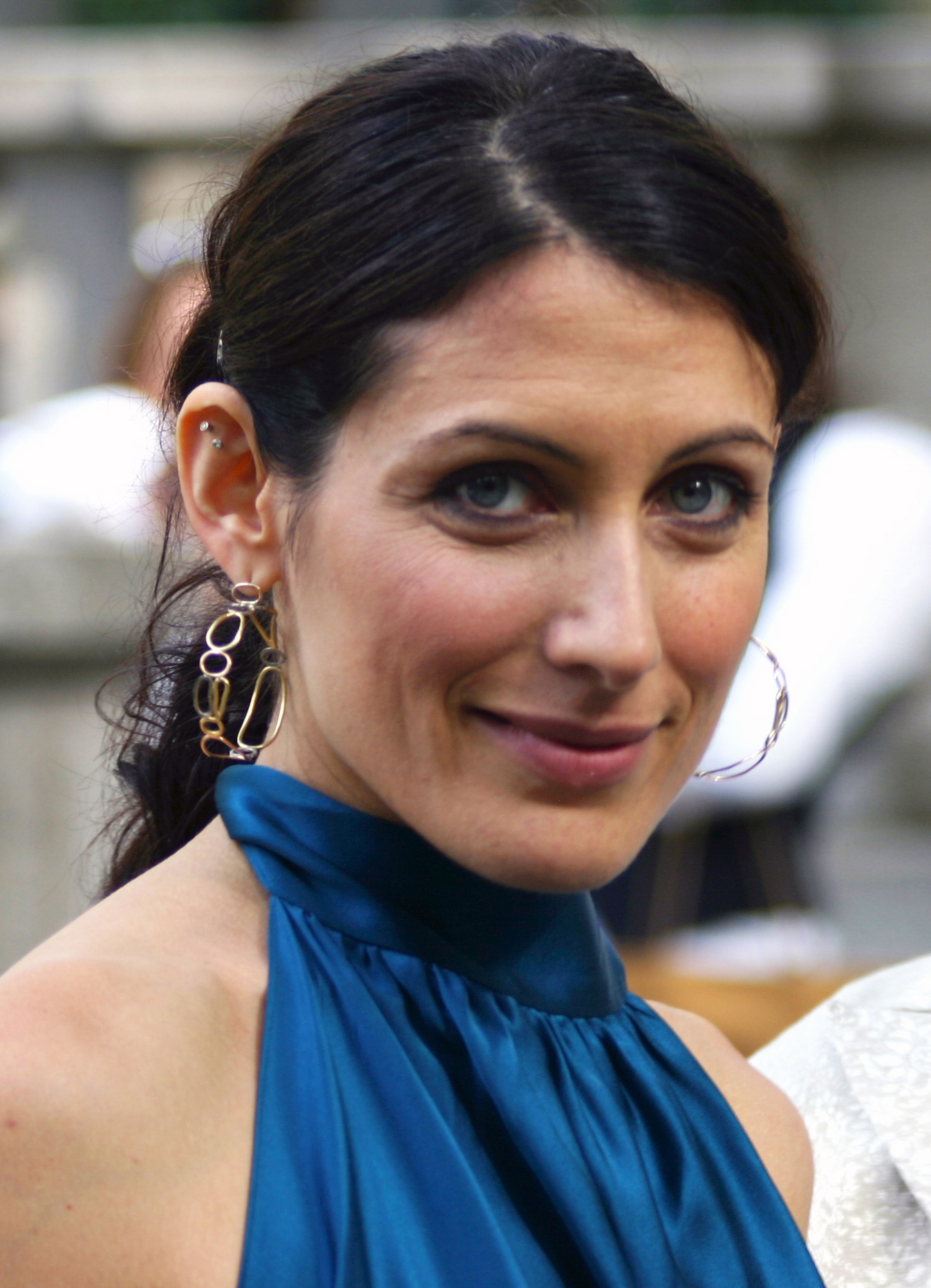
- Edelstein in 2007
- Born: May 21, 1966 (age 60); Boston, Massachusetts, U.S.
- Education: New York University
- Occupations: Actress; playwright; artist
- Years active: 1990–present
- Spouse: Robert Russell (m. 2014)

Lisa Edelstein (/ˈliːsə ˈɛdəlstiːn/ EDD-əl-steen; born May 21, 1966) is an American actress and artist. She is known for playing Dr. Lisa Cuddy on the Fox medical drama series House (2004–2011). Between 2014 and 2018, Edelstein starred as Abby McCarthy in the Bravo series Girlfriends' Guide to Divorce.

== Early life ==
Edelstein was born in Boston, Massachusetts, to Bonnie and Alvin Edelstein, the youngest of three children in a Jewish family. Her father worked as a pediatrician at Chilton Memorial Hospital. She was raised in Wayne, New Jersey, and attended Wayne Valley High School, graduating in 1984.

At 16, Edelstein was a cheerleader for the New Jersey Generals. Edelstein participated in a protest against poor working conditions. She said she felt they were treated "like hookers" and helped organize a cheerleader walkout.

While living in New York, she became involved in the club scene (known there only as "Lisa E") with "celebutant" James St. James, who briefly refers to Edelstein in his 1999 book Disco Bloodbath. She caused enough of a stir in the community to be dubbed New York City's "Queen of the Night" by Maureen Dowd in a 1986 article of The New York Times entitled "Lisa In Wonderland."

== Career ==
=== Actress ===
In response to the growing AIDS crisis of the 1980s, Edelstein wrote, composed and starred in an original musical called Positive Me which she performed at La MaMa Experimental Theatre Club in New York City, receiving many accolades. She followed that with a short stint hosting MTV's Awake on the Wild Side in 1990, then began working in earnest as an actress. She got her SAG card appearing as a backstage make-up artist in Oliver Stone's Jim Morrison biography The Doors, and then landed a quick series of guest roles on several popular comedies, including Mad About You, Wings, The Larry Sanders Show, and Sports Night, where she played a sports reporter who claimed to be a former lover of Josh Charles' character whom he did not remember. Perhaps most famous from this time was her appearances on Seinfeld, where she played George Costanza's girlfriend in the episodes "The Mango" and "The Masseuse."

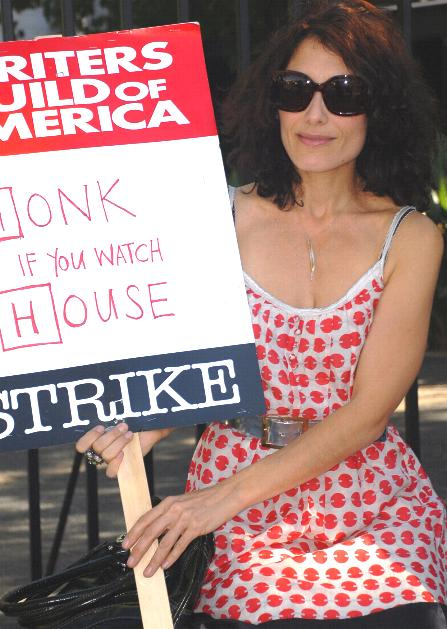
Edelstein picketed during the 2007–08 Writers Guild of America strike, which halted the production of House.

Bigger roles in TV dramas soon followed, among them the lesbian sister on ABC's Relativity (1996); a high-priced call girl turned Rob Lowe's date on The West Wing (1999); a transgender woman on Ally McBeal (2000); and Ben Covington's (Scott Speedman) girlfriend on Felicity (2001). She also continued to land guest-star spots on such shows as ER, Frasier, Just Shoot Me!, Without a Trace, and Judging Amy, as well as small parts in the films What Women Want, Keeping the Faith, As Good as It Gets, and Daddy Day Care.

From 2004 to 2011, Edelstein portrayed Lisa Cuddy, the Dean of Medicine at Princeton-Plainsboro Teaching Hospital and frequent adversary, friend, and eventual girlfriend of title character Gregory House (Hugh Laurie) on Fox's TV series House. Edelstein has often spoken fondly of her experiences on the show and fellow cast and crew, especially her friendship and strong working relationship with Laurie.

In May 2011, Edelstein announced that she would not return for the eighth and final season of House. Starting in June 2011, she joined the cast of The Good Wife, where she played lawyer Celeste Serrano. She guest-starred in Scandal in 2013, and later three episodes of the ABC series Castle.

In 2014, Edelstein landed the lead role of Abby McCarthy in the Bravo series Girlfriends' Guide to Divorce, an hour-long dramedy loosely based on the book series by Vicki Iovine focusing on the lives of newly divorced, mid-life women. It ran for five seasons in which she got to expand her creative participation by becoming a producer, writer, and director on the series.

In 2018, Edelstein joined the cast of ABC's The Good Doctor in season two as Dr. Marina Blaize in a recurring role. This reunited her with House creator David Shore as well as with Richard Schiff, who played her father on Relativity.

Edelstein then joined the award-winning The Kominsky Method, a Netflix series that debuted in November 2018, playing the drug-addled daughter of Alan Arkin and working alongside such actors such as Michael Douglas, Paul Reiser and Chuck Lorre. During that time she also reunited with Rob Lowe, playing his ex-wife Gwyneth Morgan, and mother of TK Strand (Ronen Rubenstein) on the ABC drama series 9-1-1: Lone Star. She played a Holocaust survivor and adoptive mother in the Canadian indigenous TV drama Little Bird, which was nominated for 19 Canadian Screen Awards.

Edelstein is also a voice actress. Her roles include Mercy Graves in the DC Animated Universe, Sharri Rothberg in American Dad!, Kya in The Legend of Korra, and a guest role as Alexis in King of the Hill.

=== Other appearances ===
Edelstein is a supporter of Best Friends Animal Society, of which she is an ambassador. She supports human rights organizations and is a patron of the arts. She has appeared in numerous magazines, including the September 2010 cover of H magazine. She posed for PETA in an ad promoting vegetarianism, a diet she has followed for most of her life.

== Art ==
During the COVID-19 pandemic in 2020, Edelstein began to sketch and paint. She began working with magic marker, and at the suggestion of her artist husband Robert Russell switched to watercolor as the size of each piece grew. Edelstein's portfolio is inspired by old family photographs that are "unintended moments, telling unintended truths".

== Personal life ==
Edelstein married artist Robert Russell in Los Angeles on May 25, 2014. She became a stepmother to Russell's two sons from a previous marriage.

Edelstein was raised in a traditional Jewish household that kept kosher, built a sukkah, attended synagogue on Shabbat, and discussed the weekly Torah portion at Shabbat dinner. After marrying artist Robert Russell, she resumed hosting Shabbat dinners, a practice the couple continued with extended family and friends.

== Filmography ==
=== Film ===
Year	Title	Role	Notes
1991	The Doors	Makeup artist	
1997	As Good as It Gets	Woman at table	
1998	Susan's Plan	Penny Myers	
1998	L.A. Without a Map	Sandra	
1999	30 Days	Danielle	
2000	Keeping the Faith	Ali Decker	
2000	What Women Want	Dina	
2003	Daddy Day Care	Crispin's mother	
2005	Say Uncle	Sarah Faber	
2013	She Loves Me Not	Amy	
2016	Joshy	Claudia	
2019	Phoenix, Oregon	Tanya	
2021	Dr. Bird's Advice for Sad Poets	Elly	
2023	Swipe NYC	Syd	Short film
2023	Shadow Brother Sunday	Sandra	Short film
2024	The Everything Pot	Rachel	Also producer

=== Television ===
Year	Title	Role	Notes
1992	L.A. Law	Francine Flicker	Episode: "My Friend Flicker"
1992	Mad About You	Lynne Stoddard	Episode: "Out of the Past"
1993	Good Advice	Robin	Episode: "The Kiss"
1993	Seinfeld	Karen	"The Masseuse" and "The Mango"
1993	Wings	Marsha Peebles	Episode: "Labor Pains"
1994	The Larry Sanders Show	Diane French	Episode: "The Mr. Sharon Stone Show"
1994	Wild Oats	Unknown	Episode: "Pilot"
1995–97	Almost Perfect	Patty Karp	8 episodes
1995	Partners	Cindy Wolfe	Episode: "Who's Afraid of Ron and Cindy Wolfe?"
1995	Superman: The Animated Series	Mercy Graves (voice)	7 episodes
1996–97	Relativity	Rhonda Roth	Main role
1996	Ned & Stacey	Janine	Episode: "Friends and Lovers"
1997	ER	Aggi Orton	Episode: "Ambush"
1998	Frasier	Caitlin	Episode: "Frasier Gotta Have It"
1998	Just Shoot Me!	Erin Simons	Episode: "Sewer!"
1998	Indiscreet	Beth Sussman	Television film
1998	Nothing Sacred	Rabbi Judith Fisher	Episode: "Holy Words"
1999	Sports Night	Bobbi Bernstein	2 episodes
1999–2000	The West Wing	Laurie "Brittany" Rollins	5 episodes
2000	Grosse Pointe	Shawn Shapiro	Episode: "Satisfaction"
2000–01	Ally McBeal	Cindy McCauliff	5 episodes
2001	Black River	Laura	Television film
2001	The Zeta Project	Gwen Evans (voice)	Episode: "Ro's Reunion"
2001–02	Felicity	Lauren	6 episodes
2002	Obsessed	Charlotte	Television film
2002	Leap of Faith	Patty	Main
2003	A Date with Darkness: The Trial and Capture of Andrew Luster	Maeve Fox	Television film
2003	Without a Trace	Dr. Lianna Sardo	Episode: "Moving On"
2003	The Practice	Diane Ward	2 episodes
2003	Justice League	Mercy Graves (voice)	Episode: "Tabula Rasa"
2004	Judging Amy	Sylvia Danforth	Episode: "The Quick and the Dead"
2005	Justice League Unlimited	Mercy Graves (voice)	Episode: "Clash"
2005	Fathers and Sons	Irene	Television film
2004–11	House	Dr. Lisa Cuddy	Main: Seasons 1–7; People's Choice Award for Favorite TV Drama Actress; Satellite Award for Best Supporting Actress – Series, Miniseries or Television Film; Nominated — Screen Actors Guild Award for Outstanding Performance by an Ensemble in a Drama Series
2007	King of the Hill	Alexis (voice)	Episode: "The Powder Puff Boys"
2007–11	American Dad!	Sharri Rothberg (voice)	6 episodes
2008	Special Delivery	Maxine Carter	Television film
2011	Childrens Hospital	Herself/Lisa Cuddy	Episode: "Run, Dr. Lola Spratt, Run!"
2011	The Good Wife	Celeste Serano	3 episodes
2011	Paul The Male Matchmaker	Jillian	Episode: "Know When You Are Not Ready"
2012	Blue-Eyed Butcher	Kelly Siegler	Television film
2012	Elementary	Heather Van Owen	Episode: "The Long Fuse"
2013	House of Lies	Brynn	2 episodes
2013	Scandal	Sarah Stanner	Episode: "Top of the Hour"
2013	Castle	Rachel McCord	3 episodes
2013–14	The Legend of Korra	Kya (voice)	14 episodes
2014–18	Girlfriends' Guide to Divorce	Abby McCarthy	Main Women's Image Network Award for Outstanding Actress in a Comedy Series (2015, 2016)
2018–19	The Good Doctor	Dr. Marina Blaize	6 episodes
2018–21	The Kominsky Method	Phoebe	Recurring role Nominated — Screen Actors Guild Award for Outstanding Performance by an Ensemble in a Comedy Series
2021–22	9-1-1: Lone Star	Gwyneth Morgan	Recurring (season 2); guest (season 3)
2023	Little Bird	Golda Rosenblum	TV Limited Series
2025	Going Dutch	Nina Quinn	Episode: "The Exes of Evil"
2025	Long Story Short	Naomi Schwartz (voice)	Main cast

=== Video games ===
Year	Title	Role	Notes
1997	Blade Runner	Crystal Steele	

=== Podcasts ===
Year	Title	Role	Notes
2020	Borrasca	Leah Dixon	

== Awards ==
Edelstein has been nominated by the Screen Actors Guild for the following performances:

- 15th SAG Awards: Outstanding Performance by an Ensemble in a Drama, nomination, for House (2009)
- 26th SAG Awards: Outstanding Performance by an Ensemble in a Comedy, nomination, for The Kominsky Method (2020)
- 28th SAG Awards: Outstanding Performance by an Ensemble in a Comedy, nomination, for The Kominsky Method (2022)

Edelstein has won the International Press Academy's Satellite Awards for the following performances:

- 10th Satellite Awards: Outstanding Actress in a Supporting Role in a Series, winner, for House (2005)
- 26th Satellite Awards: Outstanding Actress in a Supporting Role in a Series, winner, for The Kominsky Method (2021)

In 2011, she won the People's Choice Award for Best Drama Actress in a TV Series for her portrayal of Dr. Lisa Cuddy on House.

Edelstein has won the Women's Image Network Awards for the following performances:

- 17th WIN Awards: Outstanding Actress in a Comedy Series, winner, for Girlfriend's Guide to Divorce (2015)
- 18th WIN Awards: Outstanding Actress in a Comedy Series, winner, for Girlfriend's Guide to Divorce (2016)
