= Elizabeth Sung =

American actress

- Born: Elizabeth Fong Sung; 14 October 1954; Happy Valley, British Hong Kong
- Died: 22 May 2018 (aged 63); Los Angeles, California, U.S.
- Education: Juilliard School (BFA); American Film Institute (MFA)
- Occupations: Actress, director, screenwriter
- Years active: 1988–2018
- Spouse: Peter Tulipan

Elizabeth Fong Sung (Chinese: 孫芳; pinyin: Sūn Fāng; 14 October 1954 – 22 May 2018) was a Hong Kong-American actress, director, and screenwriter. She was also a revered acting teacher and mentor to young performers and filmmakers in the Asian-Pacific community.

== Early life and education ==
Sung was born and raised in British Hong Kong and studied ballet at a young age before coming to the United States.

She attended the Juilliard School and earned a BFA in dance. She was a member of the Alvin Ailey Dance Company. Sung also earned an MFA in directing from the American Film Institute.

== Career ==
Sung made her 1988 screen debut on the television series The Equalizer as Manika in the season four episode "Riding the Elephant." Sung's film debut came shortly thereafter in the French production of Le Palanquin des larmes (Journey in Tears), followed by an appearance on China Beach in 1989.

From 1994-96, Sung appeared on the American soap opera The Young and the Restless as Luan Volien. She directed the short film Requiem, based on her childhood in Hong Kong and her journey to New York City as a ballet student. It won a CINE Golden Eagle Award in 1996.

Her other notable television appearances included roles on Hawaii Five-O, The Sopranos, Bones, Curb Your Enthusiasm, NCIS: Los Angeles, and Charmed. She starred in The Joy Luck Club, Memoirs of a Geisha, and Lethal Weapon 4.

Sung appeared in Asian-American comedies including Anita Ho, Front Cover, and Vivian Bang's White Rabbit that screened at the Sundance Festival in 2018.

== Personal life and death ==
Sung was married to writer and actor Peter Tulipan. She was fluent in both Cantonese and Mandarin. Her brother, Philip, died in 1985 from AIDS.

Sung died on 22 May 2018, aged 63. Her cause of death initially had not been released, but it was later revealed Sung died from lymphoma.

== Filmography ==
=== Film ===
Year	Title	Role	Notes	Ref.
1988	Le Palanquin des larmes	Tsong Hai	Drama film directed and co-written by Jacques Dorfmann	
1989	Tango & Cash	Interpreter	Buddy cop action comedy film directed by Andrei Konchalovsky	
1990	China Cry	Interrogator	Biographical film directed by James F. Collier	
1992	Death Ring	Ms. Ling	Credited as Elizabeth Fong Sung; Action film directed by R.J. Kizer	
1993	The Joy Luck Club	Second Wife	Drama film directed and co-produced by Wayne Wang	
1994	The Puppet Masters	Technician #1	Science fiction film, adapted by Ted Elliott, Terry Rossio and David S. Goyer	
1995	Requiem	Mother	Short film	
1997	The White Fox		Short; director, writer	
1998	Lethal Weapon 4	Hong's Wife	Buddy cop action film directed and produced by Richard Donner	
1998	Restless	Richard's mother	Romantic film directed and co-written by Jule Gilfillan	
1998	The Water Ghost		Short; director, writer (as F. Elizabeth Sung)	
2002	Hero	Flying Snow	Voice; Wuxia film directed and produced by Zhang Yimou	
2005	Memoirs of a Geisha	Mrs. Sakamoto	Epic drama film directed by Rob Marshall	
2006	Falling for Grace	Ma	Romantic comedy directed by Fay Ann Lee	
2007	Ping Pong Playa	Mrs. Wang	Sports comedy film directed by Jessica Yu and written by Yu & Jimmy Tsai	
2008	Nuptials of the Dead	Mrs. Lee	Short drama film directed by Maya Lim	
2008	Finding Madison	Mrs. Lee	Drama film directed by Tuan Tran	
2010	House Under Siege	Margot	Action thrlller film written and directed by Mark Hazen Kelly	
2010	The Boxer	May	Short drama film directed by David Au and Teddy Chen	
2011	L.A. Coffin School	Ming	Short drama film co-written and directed by Erin Li	
2012	The People I've Slept With	Mrs. Lee	Sex comedy film directed by Quentin Lee	
2012	Anita Ho	Mrs. Lee		
2013	Go for Sisters	Mother Han	Crime drama written, directed, and edited by John Sayles	
2014	Woman In Fragments	Mei-Ling Wong	Short drama film by Zhou Quan	
2014	Yes, And...	Mrs. Ding		
2015	Front Cover	Yen Fu		
2015	Pali Road	Mrs. Zhang		
2016	The Unbidden	Anna		
2016	Big Fish & Begonia	Old Chun	English version, Voice	
2017	Fallen Stars	Joyce		
2018	White Rabbit			
2018	Duck Duck Goose		Voice	
2018	For Izzy	Anna		
2018	North Blvd	Landlord		

=== Television ===
Year	Title	Role	Notes	Ref.
1988	The Equalizer	Manika	Episode: "Riding the Elephant"	
1989	China Beach	Roxanne	Episode: "Independence Day"	
1989	Murder, She Wrote	Lipreader	Episode: "Jack and Bill"	
1990	Hiroshima: Out of the Ashes	Extra	Historical Made-for-TV Movie directed by Peter Werner	
1990	Kojak: Flowers for Matty	Lan	TV movie. directed by Paul Krasny	
1991	Knots Landing	Linda Takashi	Episode: "Call Me Dimitri"	
1994–1996	The Young and the Restless	Luan Volien	Main cast member	
1998	Charmed	Mrs. Chao	Episode: "Dead Man Dating"	
1999	Border Line	Mrs. Chen	TV movie. directed by Ken Kwapis	
1999	ER	Mrs. May Fong	Episode: "Sticks and Stones"	
2000	Touched by an Angel	Yung Shim Noh	Episode: "Reasonable Doubt"	
2000	Passions	Danielle Dwyer	Episode #1.375; Episode #1.376	
2002	NYPD Blue	Mrs. Quon	Episode: "A Little Dad'll Do Ya"	
2002	Gotta Kick It Up!	Ms. Kim	TV movie. directed by Ramón Menéndez	
2002	For the People	Yen Marty	Episode: "Nascent"	
2005	Crossing Jordan	Su-Ying Zhang	Episode: "You Really Got Me"	
2005	House	Marilyn Park	Episode: "Love Hurts"	
2005	E-Ring	Kit Yee's Mother	Episode: "Pilot"	
2006	Desperate Housewives	Translator	Episode: "Silly People"; Uncredited	
2007	Studio 60 on the Sunset Strip	Mrs. Tao	Episodes: "Monday"; "The Harriet Dinner: Part II"	
2007	The Sopranos	Mrs. Chong	Episode: "Remember When"	
2008	Ni Hao, Kai-Lan	Mommy Panda	Voice, Episode: "Kai-Lan's Trip to China"	
2009	The Suite Life on Deck	Khun Yai	Episode: "Family Thais"	
2009	The Forgotten	Mei Chen	Episode: "Parachute Jane"	
2009–2010	FlashForward	Saayo Noh	Episodes: "A561984"; "Let No Man Put Asunder"	
2010	Kosher Pig	Lillian Li	TV movie. directed by Eric Patton	
2010	NCIS: Los Angeles	Ming Lee	Episode: "Chinatown"	
2011	Bones	Mama Liu	Episode: "The Body in the Bag"	
2011	CSI: Crime Scene Investigation	Cynthia Katsu	Episode: "Turn On, Tune In, Drop Dead"	
2011	Curb Your Enthusiasm	O'Donnell's Housekeeper	Episode: "The Divorce"	
2012	Awake	Mrs. Koh	Episode: "Game Day"	
2012	Mike & Molly	Tammy	Episode: "Yard Sale"	
2013	Shameless	Mrs. Wong	Episodes: "A Long Way from Home"; "Where There's a Will"	
2014	Miss Guidance	Mrs. Chen	Episode: "Defensive"; Created by and starring Sandy Velasco	
2015	It's Always Sunny in Philadelphia	Female Worker	Episode: "The Gang Spies Like U.S."	
2016	Elementary	Bai May-Lung	Episode: "Who Is That Masked Man?"	
2018	The Kominsky Method	Mrs. Liu	Episode: "A Prostate Enlarges"	

=== Video games ===
Year	Title	Role	Notes	Ref.
2003	Rise to Honor	Voice	Made for PlayStation 2	
2006	Splinter Cell: Double Agent	Voice	Made for PlayStation 2, Xbox, Wii, and Microsoft Windows	
2008	The Mummy: Tomb of the Dragon Emperor	Female Chinese Soldier	Adaption of film of the same name for PlayStation 2, Wii, and the Nintendo DS	
2012	Spec Ops: The Line	Refugees	Third-person shooter game made for Microsoft Windows, Xbox 360, and PlayStation 3	
2012	Sleeping Dogs	Broken Nose Jiang	Action-adventure game originally made for PlayStation 3, Xbox 360, and Microsoft Windows; Remastered version subtitled Definitive Edition, was released for PlayStation 4, Xbox One, and Microsoft Windows	
2012	Resident Evil 6	Enemies	Action-adventure third-person shooter made for PlayStation 3 and Xbox 360	
2014	Infamous: First Light	Additional Voices		
2014	Infamous: Second Son	Asian-accented Female Pedestrian #2	Action-adventure single-player game made for PlayStation 4	
2018	Prey: Mooncrash	Riley Yu	Posthumous release	
2018	Red Dead Redemption 2	The Local Pedestrian Population	Posthumous release	
