= Vicki Iovine =

American model, writer, and lawyer (born 1954)

- Born: Vicki Ann McCarty; January 13, 1954 (age 72); Los Angeles, California, U.S.
- Education: University of California, Berkeley; University of California, Hastings College of the Law (JD); University of Cambridge (LLB)
- Spouses: Jimmy Iovine (m. 1987; div. 2009) David Coiro (m. 2014)
- Children: 4

Vicki McCarty Iovine (born Vicki Ann McCarty; January 13, 1954) is an American model, writer, and lawyer. She was named Playmate of the Month for September 1979.

== Life and career ==
Iovine received her undergraduate degree (summa cum laude, Phi Beta Kappa) in journalism from the University of California, Berkeley. She earned a J.D. degree from Hastings College of the Law and an LL.B. in International Law from Cambridge University.

She is a former member of the board of directors of the Special Olympics, as well as a former television producer and radio talk show host. She was Playboy magazine's Playmate of the Month for its September 1979 issue and was photographed by Arny Freytag. She appeared the following year as the central character on To Tell the Truth, with all four panelists correctly guessing her identity. In 1982, she was one of three finalists for the job of hostess and letter turner on Wheel of Fortune which eventually went to Vanna White. She also appeared on the cover of Playboy in August 1982.

She had an early marriage which ended in divorce; from 1987 to 2009 she was married to Jimmy Iovine, a record producer and a co-founder of Interscope Records. They have four children. In May 2014, she married David Coiro.

== Works ==
Iovine has published several titles pertaining to pregnancy and parenthood under the brand of Girlfriends' Guides, which is the basis for the TV show Girlfriends' Guide to Divorce as well as Best Friends' Guides.

=== Girlfriends' Guides ===
- The Girlfriends' Guide to Pregnancy (1st Ed. 1995, 2nd Ed. 2007)
- The Girlfriends' Guide to Pregnancy Daily Diary (1996)
- The Girlfriends' Guide to Surviving the First Year of Motherhood (1997)
- The Girlfriends' Guide to Toddlers (1999)
- The Girlfriends’ Guide to Getting your Groove Back (2001)
- The Girlfriends‘ Guide to Baby Gear (2003)
- The Girlfriends' Guide to Parties and Playdates (2003)

=== Best Friends' Guides ===
- Best Friends' Guide to Surviving the First Year of Motherhood: Wise and Witty Advice (1999)
- The Best Friends' Guide to Toddlers: A Survival Manual to the 'Terrible Twos' (and Ones and Threes) from the First Step, the First Potty and the First Word ('No') to the Last Blanket (1999)
- The Best Friends' Guide to Getting Your Life Back (2005)

== See also ==
- List of people in Playboy 1970–1979

Candy Loving	Lee Ann Michelle	Denise McConnell	Missy Cleveland	Michele Drake	Louann Fernald
Dorothy Mays	Dorothy Stratten	Vicki McCarty	Ursula Buchfellner	Sylvie Garant	Candace Collins
