= Wizards on Deck with Hannah Montana =

2009 television film directed by Rich Correll and Victor Gonzalez

- Disney Channel crossover event
- DVD cover

Part 1: Wizards of Waverly Place
- Episode title: "Cast-Away (To Another Show)"
- Episode no.: Season 2 Episode 25
- Directed by: Victor Gonzalez
- Written by: Peter Murrieta
- Production code: 220
- Original air date: July 17, 2009

Episode chronology
← Previous "Wizard for a Day"	Next → "Wizards vs. Vampires on Waverly Place"
- Wizards of Waverly Place season 2

Part 2: The Suite Life on Deck
- Episode title: "Double-Crossed"
- Episode no.: Season 1 Episode 21
- Directed by: Rich Correll
- Written by: Danny Kallis & Pamela Eells O'Connell
- Production code: 120
- Original air date: July 17, 2009

Episode chronology
← Previous "Cruisin' for a Bruisin'"	Next → "The Spy Who Shoved Me"

Part 3: Hannah Montana
- Episode title: "Super(stitious) Girl"
- Episode no.: Season 3 Episode 19
- Directed by: Rich Correll
- Written by: Michael Poryes & Steven Peterman
- Production code: 316
- Original air date: July 17, 2009

Episode chronology
← Previous "He Could Be the One (Hannah Montana)"	Next → "I Honestly Love You (No, Not You)"
- Hannah Montana season 3

"Wizards on Deck with Hannah Montana" is a trilogy of crossover episodes between three Disney Channel original sitcoms which premiered in the United States on July 17, 2009. The crossover spanned across episodes of Wizards of Waverly Place, The Suite Life on Deck, and Hannah Montana. In the crossover, Max, Justin and Alex Russo join regulars from The Suite Life on Deck aboard the SS Tipton, and Cody Martin attempts to retrieve tickets for a Hannah Montana concert in Hawaii, while Miley Stewart, en route to the concert on the SS Tipton, loses her mother's lucky anklet – triggering a streak of bad luck. This crossover is the sequel to That's So Suite Life of Hannah Montana.

== Release ==
The broadcast was watched by 9.3 million viewers, becoming the highest-rated program of the night on both broadcast and specialty television. The show aired in the United Kingdom on October 2, 2009, as part of Disney Channel's "big five Friday" at 6.30pm. The crossover premiered on Disney Channel Middle East on December 6, 2009, as part of the Christmas special and was watched by 400,000 viewers. It premiered in Disney Channel Latin America on February 12, 2010, as part of "February on Board."

== Plot ==
=== Part 1: "Cast-Away (To Another Show)" ===
Season 2, episode 25 of Wizards of Waverly Place.

Justin Russo is excited to meet London Tipton when he wins an essay contest prize, which is a "teen cruise" to Hawaii on the SS Tipton. His brother and sister Max Russo and Alex Russo are also excited, but their parents Theresa and Jerry Russo refuse to let Alex go because she is behind in school. However, Alex finds out that there is a school on board the ship, and she pleads for her parents to let her go on the cruise as well; they agree on the condition that she not skip any classes while she is on board. Alex agrees, but instead of attending classes, she uses magic to bring her friend Harper Finkle aboard and makes her attend the classes under her name; There, Harper meets Cody Martin. Meanwhile, Alex meets Bailey Pickett and helps her win a game of tug-of-war by cheating; when Mr. Moseby insists on knowing her name, Alex uses the name Ashley Olsen to avoid getting into trouble. When Justin meets London, he pretends that he is a doctor, which gains her interest. However, Justin begins to lose interest in her when he discovers how unintelligent she is. Elsewhere, Max meets Cody's identical twin brother Zack Martin, and they compete to see who can drink a slushie faster. However, they make the mistake of drinking from the same cup, so they decide to race luggage carts instead. While doing so, Max accidentally bumps his cart into several people standing in front of the hot tub, and Bailey gets knocked over into it while eating pizza and starts choking. London sees this and pleads for Justin to help Bailey, but Justin says that he doesn't know how to save her. Alex then steps in and rescues Bailey by giving her abdominal thrusts. Mr. Moseby then steps in to congratulate Alex for helping Bailey and, having forgotten her name, asks for it again. Alex, having forgotten the name Ashley Olsen, says her name is Ashley Simpson (and then Ashley Simpson-Olsen after being reminded by Bailey of what she said before). Max and Harper then arrive on the scene and call Alex by her real name and Harper, respectively, which leaves Mr. Moseby extremely confused. Max tells Mr. Moseby the truth; in response, Alex pushes him into the hot tub. London, ashamed of Justin for not trying to save Bailey, calls him "a dumb doctor" and breaks up with him (which Justin goes along with). In the end, Alex transports Harper home using magic, but then realizes that she may have accidentally sent her to Rome instead, and continues to skip class.

=== Part 2: "Double-Crossed" ===
Season 1, episode 21 of The Suite Life on Deck.

Hannah Montana, also known as Miley Stewart, and her best friend Lola Luftnagle, also known as Lily Truscott, board the SS Tipton on their way to a concert performance in Hawaii. Cody attempts to get Bailey, who is a big fan of Hannah, and himself tickets to the concert because he knows Hannah from the time she stayed at the Tipton Hotel in Boston and ate cake off of Zack's shirt. Cody first tries to get tickets from Hannah directly, but she doesn't remember him. He then tries to get London to help him, but she refuses as she has a grudge against Hannah. On the verge of giving up, Cody learns that he can get tickets by participating in a scavenger hunt, and he enlists his friend Woody Fink to help him. Meanwhile, Justin, Alex, and Max are still aboard the cruise; Max meets London and attempts to impress her with roomy luggage, while Alex meets Zack, who develops a crush on her. After being embarrassed in front of Zack by Justin, Alex pulls a prank on her brother by putting blue dye in the hot tub and escapes him and Mr. Moseby by hiding in Zack's cabin. Mr. Moseby, believing Zack is responsible, sentences him to confinement in his cabin. Zack blames Cody for his predicament, believing his brother is getting revenge on him for gluing a brush into his hair as a prank, and he and Alex sneak out. Zack finds Cody and prevents him from completing the scavenger hunt, and Justin proves to Mr. Moseby that Alex was the one who put the dye in the hot tub and takes her away, saying that she will be grounded. Mr. Moseby apologizes to Zack for falsely accusing him, but tells him that he is still in trouble, as he had confessed to committing other pranks in the process. Cody fails to get tickets to see Hannah Montana, and is disappointed, but Bailey is happy that Cody did everything he could to try to get the tickets for the two of them. Cody then gets a cake that Woody was holding splattered on his shirt, causing Hannah to remember him (mistaking him for Zack) when she next sees him; Hannah gives both Cody and Bailey concert tickets. Bailey then tells Cody that they will have the best date ever, then surprises him with a kiss. Cody and Bailey start a relationship. Before the Russo children depart the cruise, London tells Max that they will meet again, kissing him on the cheek.

This is the only episode in the crossover to feature characters from all three series involved in the crossover, much was the case in the That's So Suite Life of Hannah Montana crossover where the episode of the same name in The Suite Life of Zack & Cody part of the crossover featured cast members from that series, That's So Raven and Hannah Montana. However, neither Selena Gomez, David Henrie nor Jake T. Austin have any scenes with either Miley Cyrus or Emily Osment in this episode. This is also the first episode that Cody and Bailey are seen to have a requited love (Cody has liked Bailey as more than a friend since the series pilot, but Bailey has not seemed to like him as more than a friend until this episode). All the main cast from The Suite Life on Deck appeared in all three shows. Alex, Justin and Max make their final crossover appearance in this episode.

=== Part 3: "Super(stitious) Girl" ===
Season 3, episode 20 of Hannah Montana.

The SS Tipton arrives in Hawaii. Hannah loses an anklet that her deceased mother gave her which she considers lucky, and bad things start to happen to her: Her rehearsal for her concert goes poorly, she gets someone else's pet rat in her head, and she rips her shirt. Hannah and Lola search for the anklet but cannot find it. A maid finds the anklet and shows it to Mr. Moseby, but London takes it, seeing it as valuable. Hannah and Lola see London holding the anklet and, after first encountering Zack, they attempt to convince her to return the anklet; however, when Hannah says that the anklet has fake diamonds, London freaks out and drops it overboard by accident. Hannah wonders if things could get any worse, and they do: A storm blows her blond wig away, her hair dye turns her hair green instead of blond, and finally, a mirror breaks. This is the last straw for Hannah and when Cody and Bailey come to thank her for their concert tickets, she says that she is canceling her concert, which upsets them both. She talks with her father Robby, who has spent the entire cruise dealing with seasickness, about how depressed she feels and that she always felt as if her mother's spirit was in the anklet, but he cheers her up by telling her that the spirit of her mother is also in her heart and also revealing that he always has a back-up wig, which he gives to her. Hannah then tells Cody and Bailey the concert is back on and that they are invited to the after-party. When Bailey asks Cody if this was all his plan, Cody answers by saying that a good relationship needs honesty, but lies by saying that it was his plan. Hannah's concert goes ahead, and all is well.

Meanwhile, back at Hannah's house in Malibu, her brother Jackson and her friend Oliver Oken receive a package addressed to Robby. Although Robby warns them not to open it, Jackson and Oliver cannot help but wonder what is in the package and they and Rico Suave open the package anyway, revealing a bounce house. The bounce house automatically inflates itself, getting the boys stuck to the window for quite some time, but Rico eventually deflates it with his fingernail.

In this episode, Miley and Lilly appeared only as Hannah and Lola.

== Cast and characters ==
=== "Cast-Away (To Another Show)" ===
Actor	Role
Selena Gomez	Alex Russo
David Henrie	Justin Russo
Jake T. Austin	Max Russo
Jennifer Stone	Harper Finkle
Maria Canals-Barrera	Theresa Russo
David DeLuise	Jerry Russo
Cole Sprouse	Cody Martin
Dylan Sprouse	Zack Martin
Brenda Song	London Tipton
Debby Ryan	Bailey Pickett
Phill Lewis	Mr. Moseby

=== "Double-Crossed" ===
Actor	Role
Cole Sprouse	Cody Martin
Dylan Sprouse	Zack Martin
Brenda Song	London Tipton
Debby Ryan	Bailey Pickett
Phill Lewis	Mr. Moseby
Jake T. Austin	Max Russo
Miley Cyrus	Miley Stewart/Hannah Montana
Selena Gomez	Alex Russo
David Henrie	Justin Russo
Emily Osment	Lilly Truscott/Lola Luftnagle
Matthew Timmons	Woody Fink
Windell D. Middlebrooks	Kirby Morris

=== "Super(stitious) Girl" ===
Actor	Role
Miley Cyrus	Miley Stewart/Hannah Montana
Emily Osment	Lilly Truscott/Lola Luftnagle
Mitchel Musso	Oliver Oken
Jason Earles	Jackson Stewart
Moisés Arias	Rico Suave
Billy Ray Cyrus	Robby Stewart
Cole Sprouse	Cody Martin
Dylan Sprouse	Zack Martin
Brenda Song	London Tipton
Debby Ryan	Bailey Pickett
Phill Lewis	Mr. Moseby

== Home media ==
The special was released by Walt Disney Studios Home Entertainment on DVD on September 22, 2009. Bonus features include:

- Justin's Award-Winning Essay! – Watch the essay video that got Justin and his siblings on the SS Tipton Teen Cruise.
- It's a Suite Life Having Fun with Hannah and the Wizards—Hilarious bloopers and backstage interviews with the stars.

== Theme song ==
The theme song to Wizards on Deck with Hannah Montana is a remix of the three shows' opening sequences and theme songs in a format of a Rubik's Cube twisting and turning to the three shows' theme songs; it starts with Wizards of Waverly Place, then The Suite Life on Deck, and followed by Hannah Montana. It lasted for 1:03 minutes and appears during the show when changing to the different episodes. The 1:03 minute theme song is not on the DVD sale of the Canadian region (separated into 3 different shows, broadcast with own theme songs).

Subsequent rebroadcasts of all three episodes feature each show's respective opening sequences for the individual episodes, as well as the closing credits for Wizards of Waverly Place and The Suite Life on Deck for the episodes of those two series that were part of the crossover, that were not included in the original broadcast and initial repeats. This is Disney Channel's first crossover to have an opening sequence and theme song to show first, then to start their respective episodes series. In the UK, however, it is shown, even on the premier, as three individual episodes, with three individual title sequences.
