= Wizards of Waverly Place season 2 =

Season of television series

Wizards of Waverly Place
- Season 2
- Wizards of Waverly Place season two cast
- No. of episodes: 30

Release
- Original network: Disney Channel
- Original release: September 12, 2008 – August 21, 2009

Season chronology
- ← Previous; Season 1 Next → Season 3

The second season of Wizards of Waverly Place aired on Disney Channel from September 12, 2008 to August 21, 2009. The season deals with the Russo children, Alex (Selena Gomez), Justin (David Henrie) and Max Russo (Jake T. Austin) continuing to compete to become the leading wizard in their family. Also starring in the series are Maria Canals Barrera and David DeLuise as their parents, Theresa and Jerry, and Jennifer Stone as Alex's best friend, Harper Finkle.

== Synopsis ==
Harper now knows, as of the season’s eighth episode, that Alex, Justin and Max are wizards. Alex and Justin have new love interests Dean Moriarty (Daniel Samonas), and Juliet Van Heusen (Bridgit Mendler) respectively. The series characters cross over with The Suite Life on Deck and Hannah Montana in part one and two of "Wizards on Deck with Hannah Montana" featuring cast members from The Suite Life on Deck namely, Dylan and Cole Sprouse, Brenda Song, Debby Ryan and Phill Lewis.

Guest stars and recurring cast include: Dan Benson, Bill Chott, Skyler Samuels, Josh Sussman, Daryl Sabara, Cindy Crawford, Fred Willard, Rachel Dratch, Jenica Bergere, Dwayne Johnson, Misty May-Treanor, JD Cullum, Anne Ramsay, Amanda Tepe and Jeff Garlin.

== Plot ==
Alex has another love interest, her classmate Dean Moriarty, and tries to impress him by using magic to make him think she is smart. In another episode, when Alex's nemesis, Gigi Hollingsworth, finds her diary which she draws in, she finds out about Alex's crush on Dean. When Gigi gets trapped, she gets back out and is convinced she hit her head. She tells the school of Alex's crush on Dean and Alex admits what she does in her journal, but denies it was Dean who was the prince in her drawings. He still, however, seems impressed. She later asks him if he will help fix an old car of her father's, which he agrees to do. Dean then enters it in a race once fixing it, but Alex gets mad when her family begin to like Dean and he doesn't spend as much time with her. Alex then transports herself into the car during the race to talk to Dean, who reveals he likes her. Dean asks Alex out, but on a triple date. After Alex eliminates the other couples so that she can be alone with Dean, she realizes he wants to kiss her. On the date, she tries to distract Dean so that he will not, but after he tells her he likes her too much, they kiss. Alex promises she will not abandon him, but then runs off to help her brother. She comes back and they make up. Alex later reveals she doesn't like how badly Dean expresses his feelings. When wizard students stay at the Russos' due to Wiz Tech being closed down, Ronald Longcape Jr. begins to develop feelings for her. Alex feels guilty when she thinks she is falling in love with Ronald. Ronald gets rid of Dean and then transforms into him as to break up with Alex so he can be with her. Ronald takes advantage of her and makes her evil like him and his father so that they can rule. Alex then reveals she is in love with Dean, so he is transformed back. Dean is back and starts calling Alex his girlfriend. Tired of lying to her best friend, she reveals magic to Harper by taking her into space on her birthday. Dean moves away, but Alex tries to continue dating him in his dreams with the use of magic. When he comes to see her, they go out on a date but she realizes they have drifted apart, so she breaks up with him.

When the Van Heusen family open a sandwich shop right next to the Sub Station, they begin to lose business. They send Justin over as a spy, but he meets Juliet Van Heusen, the owner's daughter, and falls for her. Their parents say they cannot date, as their businesses are competing but once learning she is now the good child of the family, Alex changes their parents' minds. Justin discovers Juliet is a vampire, and she tells him she knows he is a wizard. Justin and Juliet get more serious and reveal to each other that they have fallen in love.

== Cast ==
- Selena Gomez as Alex Russo
- David Henrie as Justin Russo
- Jake T. Austin as Max Russo
- Jennifer Stone as Harper Finkle
- Maria Canals Barrera as Theresa Russo
- David DeLuise as Jerry Russo

== Episodes ==
Wizards of Waverly Place Season 2 episodes
No. overall	No. in season	Title	Directed by	Written by	Original release date	Prod. code	U.S. viewers (millions)
22	1	"Smarty Pants"	Victor Gonzalez	Todd J. Greenwald	September 12, 2008	201	4.8
Alex is eager to help prepare for the Quiz Bowl if it will get the attention of the new guy, Dean. Harper and Justin are planned to compete in the Quiz Bowl on opposing teams. But when Alex causes an accident that leaves one of Harper's teammates unable to compete, she is forced to participate instead. To give the team an edge in the Quiz Bowl Competition, she wears a pair of magical trousers known as "Smarty Pants", which give the wearer superior knowledge on anything and everything. However, her superior knowledge might ruin her friendship with Harper, who was counting on the Quiz Bowl to give her a new reputation as class genius. To stop herself from answering all of the questions, Alex takes off the pants, only to learn that there were some unpleasant side effects. Guest stars: Daniel Samonas as Dean Moriarty (as Dean Malone), Andy Pessoa as Alfred, Bill Chott as Mr. Laritate Note: The name of the guy that Alex has a crush on is Dean Moriarty, but the credits at the end of the show address him as Dean Malone. Absent: David DeLuise as Jerry Russo
23	2	"Beware Wolf"	Victor Gonzalez	Vince Cheung & Ben Montanio	September 21, 2008	202	4.0
Justin meets a girl named Isabella through WizFace. Alex has suspicions that Isabella is not who she seems. She thinks Isabella is a dog. After sharing a kiss, Justin learns that Isabella is actually a werewolf and, worse, he is becoming one himself. Meanwhile, Max and Alfred start a dog-walking business to earn money for cups on a chain. Guest stars: Andy Pessoa as Alfred, Sarah Ramos as Isabella Absent: Jennifer Stone as Harper Finkle
24	3	"Graphic Novel"	Mark Cendrowski	Gigi McCreery & Perry Rein	October 5, 2008	203	3.9
After Gigi steals Alex's journal, Justin and Max transport Gigi inside Alex's secret fairy tale princess world. The siblings struggle to keep Gigi from discovering Alex's secret, and revealing the family's secret to the world. Guest stars: Daniel Samonas as Dean, Skyler Samuels as Gigi Absent: Maria Canals Barrera as Theresa Russo, David DeLuise as Jerry Russo
25	4	"Racing"	Victor Gonzalez	Justine Bateman	October 12, 2008	204	4.3
Alex has developed a crush on Dean, a "gear head" type of guy. To gain his attention, she asks if Dean can fix up an old junk car of Jerry's. Dean not only fixes the car, but enters it in an upcoming race of classic cars at Paramus. Alex is dissatisfied, and uses a worthless mail-order product of Max's to teleport inside the car during the race. Unfortunately, the teleportation causes Dean to lose consciousness, resulting in a near-crash of the car. When Dean comes to, Alex talks to him and finds out that he likes her as well. In the end they drive into a massive sloppy joe. Guest stars: Daniel Samonas as Dean, Dan Benson as Zeke
26	5	"Alex's Brother, Maximan"	Victor Gonzalez	Matt Goldman	October 19, 2008	205	N/A
Alex goes on her first date with Dean at the roller rink, while Justin builds a robot for the Robot Olympics. After hearing from Jerry about a robber who steals tip jars and cupcakes, Max dons a superhero costume and plots to stop the thief. When Justin finds out, he is worried that his brother is heading into danger, so he tracks Alex down at the roller rink to ask for help. Alex is reluctant to leave Dean, but her family is more important. It turns out the story of the "robber" was all a plot by Jerry to get his children to work together and realize what is really important. Guest stars: Daniel Samonas as Dean, Dan Benson as Zeke Note: While Dan Benson is listed as guest star for his role as Zeke, he does not appear in this episode.
27	6	"Saving WizTech Part 1"	Bob Berlinger	Peter Murrieta	October 26, 2008	208	4.5
A failed evil wizard, Ronald Longcape, Sr., curses WizTech with plastic balls, creating a twofold problem—firstly, that plastic is impenetrable to even the strongest of magic, and subsequently, magic cannot be used to quickly remove the plastic balls. This causes WizTech to close, and Professor Crumbs enlists Jerry to house a few of the students at his home. Among them is Longcape, Sr.'s son, Ronald Longcape, Jr., who is also secretly evil and who tries to come between Alex and Dean. He traps Dean in Jell-O, then disguises himself as Dean to break up with Alex. Ronald gets Alex to come back to WizTech with him. Meanwhile, Justin, eager to be the savior of Wiz Tech, calls upon the help of a prestigious wizard company run by kids to help eliminate the plastic balls from the school, under two conditions: 1) They get to put up signs advertising their products, and 2) they get to play in the balls. Guest stars: Daniel Samonas as Dean, Ian Abercrombie as Professor Crumbs, Josh Sussman as Hugh Normous, Chad Duell as Ronald Longcape, Jr., Maurice Godin as Ronald Longcape, Sr. Notes: The sequel was premiered the same day as this one. See "Saving WizTech" Part 2 below. This episode was first aired on October 24, 2008 on Disney Channel UK and Ireland (even though Disney Channel USA stated that it was the world premiere when it already originally aired in the United Kingdom and Ireland two days earlier.)
28	7	"Saving WizTech Part 2"	Bob Berlinger	Vince Cheung & Ben Montanio	October 26, 2008	209	4.9
When arriving at Wiz Tech things start to get a little weird. Ronald is speaking in innuendos, spells are going wrong, and the school is being overrun by advertisements. Ronald is keeping Dean locked in the supplies closet that his dad runs. Still unbeknownst to Alex, Ronald lures her up to the Tower of Evil to play the Tetherball of Evil which will turn both of them evil. Meanwhile, Justin is trying to figure out how the school got overrun with advertisements. While he is rushing around he encounters Professor Crumbs who heard a rumor that Alex went up to the Tower of Evil and that he must make sure that she doesn't do that with Ronald Longcape. Max, hearing the whole conversation, told them that's exactly who she went with. Professor Crumbs tells them they must save their sister before it's too late. When Max and Justin get up to the tower it is already too late for Alex is already playing with Ronald. Ronald, caught, reveals his whole evil plan to them. Minutes after he tells them of his evil plans Alex and Ronald are turned Evil and get a Frankenstein and Frankenstein's Wife-like makeover. Professor Crumbs, walking up seconds after they were turned evil, tells them of a way to reverse the evil spell. One of them must be in love with someone else. Alex then realizes that she is in love with Dean, thus breaking the spell. Overcome with love Ronald tells Alex what he's done with Dean saying that she'll never find him. At that moment Ronald's dad comes up with Dean in the elevator. Seeing his father's mistake Ronald jumps in the Elevator and tells them not follow them or "lover boy gets it". Justin, in a quick moment of intelligence, jumps them down using the Pillows for Feet spell. Catching Ronald, who can barely get away with Dean, Alex takes Dean out of the Jello and receives his gift of his wooden card. Having a moment they realize that they are both madly in love with one another. Guest stars: Daniel Samonas as Dean, Ian Abercrombie as Professor Crumbs, Josh Sussman as Hugh Normous, Chad Duell as Ronald Longcape, Jr., Maurice Godin as Ronald Longcape, Sr. Absent: Jennifer Stone as Harper Finkle, Maria Canals Barrera as Theresa Russo, David DeLuise as Jerry Russo
29	8	"Harper Knows"	Victor Gonzalez	Gigi McCreery & Perry Rein	November 23, 2008	206	4.6
The Russo family is on an assignment at PopCon, a popular comic-book and movie convention. They are on the lookout for rogue wizards who may be using their magic, and Alex is on the lookout for Harper – it's Harper's birthday, and Alex lied to get out of attending PopCon with her. Harper runs into Alex and accuses her of always lying. After a fiasco involving an enchanted costume, Alex decides it's time to tell Harper that she's a wizard. Guest stars: Josh Sussman as Hugh Normous, Lee Meriwether as TV Battle Diva, Brian Scolaro as Goblin, Michael A. Shepperd as Lamp
30	9	"Taxi Dance"	Mark Cendrowski	Peter Murrieta	December 7, 2008	207	N/A
When the taxicab that Alex was born in (Cab 804) is retired, Alex magically repairs it in order for her and her family to continue to cherish the memories of her birth. However, Alex unintentionally brings it to life as well, and when the Cab decides to remain by Alex's side at all times. It follows her all over the place, and eventually crashes through the window of the loft; amazingly, Jerry and Theresa are far from angry at Alex when she explains her intentions, and Cab 804 ultimately decides to leave and go back to work. After all, Alex already has a family looking after her. Guest stars: Adam Carolla as Burt the Cab, John Capodice as Uncle Al
31	10	"Baby Cupid"	Bob Berlinger	Vince Cheung & Ben Montanio	December 14, 2008	210	4.1
Jerry and Theresa's anniversary plans are ruined over a fight about magic, which prompts Alex to summon Cupid. When Justin reminds her that magic started the fight, Alex tries to hide Cupid from her mom by claiming that he is a lifelike doll from her "Marriage and Family" class. Cupid's return gets delayed after Max accidentally breaks his arrow and it strikes Justin, causing him to fall madly in love with an elated Harper. Harper is excited until this "new" Justin starts to bug her, and she starts to miss the "old" Justin that didn't reciprocate her feelings. Guest stars: Dan Benson as Zeke, Bill Chott as Mr. Laritate, Mark DeCarlo as Cupid
32	11	"Make It Happen"	Bob Koherr	Justin Varava	January 1, 2009	211	N/A
Jerry instructs his kids to each select an alternate career in the event that they do not become wizards into adulthood. He ends up disappointed with their choices when Max chooses to be a stage magician, and Alex and Justin decide to form a rock band. It is decided that Alex and Justin can use the rock band as their Plan B only if their performance draws in a large crowd. The band is a huge success, but the celebration is short lived when they find out Max used magic to make a fake audience. In the end, Alex gives Jerry a chance to live out his old dream as a bull rider, with the whole family there to support him, but he ends up embarrassing them and they all leave. Special guest star: Fred Willard as Mr. Stuffleby Note: This episode aired at the special time of Midnight (ET/PT). Because of this, in the Central and Mountain time zones, it aired on December 31, 2008 at 11 p.m. Absent: Jennifer Stone as Harper Finkle
33	12	"Fairy Tale"	Bob Koherr	Gigi McCreery & Perry Rein	January 25, 2009	213	N/A
With college applications in mind, Justin directs a performance of Peter Pan at Tribeca Prep. He casts Harper as Tinker Bell, but Alex must play the role when Harper breaks her leg. Alex, not thrilled with the idea of actually learning lines, then gets a real fairy, Flutter, to play her part. Things do not go as planned, and the production is a disaster. Justin is cheered up when his siblings write a wonderful review. Guest stars: Dan Benson as Zeke, Bill Chott as Mr. Laritate, Rachel Cannon as Flutter
34	13	"Fashion Week"	Victor Gonzalez	Todd J. Greenwald	February 15, 2009	215	3.9
Magic is down for the day. Alex tricks Harper into letting her take care of the one-of-a-kind dress that Harper's new boss designed for fashion week. But Alex breaks her promise and models the dress in her bedroom, a situation ends in Justin getting food all over it. Alex must figure things out without the help of magic. She breaks down and tells Harper that the dress is ruined. Minutes later, Mr. Frenchy (the designer) tells Harper that his fashion show was double booked. Alex asks Mr. Frenchy if he would like to have his show at the sub station. Justin and Zeke take advantage of the models staying at the sub station by getting them to play Dungeons and Gargoyles with them. But the models accidentally get food poisoning from eating bad sandwiches. Just when things get bad, magic comes back and Alex is able to save the day. Guest stars: Cindy Crawford as Bibi Rockford, Willie Garson as Mr. Frenchy, Dan Benson as Zeke Absent: Jake T. Austin as Max Russo, Maria Canals Barrera as Theresa Russo
35	14	"Helping Hand"	Bob Koherr	Jay Baxter & Shaun Zaken	February 16, 2009	217	4.5
Justin creates the Helping Hand to assist busy wizards from the wizard world. Jerry gives Alex and Max several tedious chores, but Alex uses the Helping Hand to do her chores for her. Unfortunately, the Hand is worn out by all the work, and is unable to perform when a wizard arrives to review Justin's creation. Guest stars: John Doe as Superintendent Spellman, Kate VanDevender as Helping Hand
36	15	"Art Teacher"	Victor Gonzalez	Todd J. Greenwald	March 1, 2009	214	4.1
Alex bonds with a new art teacher, who turns out to be a teenager, Jenny, under a spell. Alex changes her back into a teenager, but with no teacher art class is cancelled. Alex manages to convince Mr. Laritate of how important art is, and he promises to get them a new teacher. Meanwhile, Max gets out of gym class by inventing a disease called Mono-oranegeosis, which makes him unable to see the color orange. This fake disease gets him sympathy from celebrities like Dwayne Johnson and Misty May-Treanor (who guest-star). But his ruse is soon revealed by a girl from school, who appears to be Misty May-Treanor's niece. Special guest star: Dwayne Johnson as himself Guest stars: Misty May-Treanor as herself, Heidi Swedberg as Miss Majorhealey, Bill Chott as Mr. Laritate, Daryl Sabara as T.J., Gilland Jones as Jenny, Kristi Lauren as Chelsa
37	16	"Future Harper"	Bob Koherr	Matt Goldman & Peter Murrieta	March 15, 2009	212	4.1
Alex, Justin and Max discover that a famous author (Rachel Dratch) is using their lives as the premise for her best-selling book series, Charmed and Dangerous. However, the wizards are shocked learning that the author, H.J. Darling, is really Harper from the future. It is revealed that she traveled back in time to write about wizards, since wizardry gets exposed in the future (the fault of one of the three Russos, as Future Harper hints). Alex is enraged that Harper has been writing books about her without permission. Future Harper tells Justin that he must convince Alex to give Past Harper permission to write the series. In the end of the episode, Selena Gomez and Rob Reiner comically talk about the importance of reading. Special guest stars: Rachel Dratch as H.J. Darling, Rob Reiner as himself Absent: Maria Canals Barrera as Theresa Russo, David DeLuise as Jerry Russo
38	17	"Alex Does Good"	Guy Distad	Vince Cheung & Ben Montanio	April 5, 2009	219	2.8
When Alex is sent to the principal's office for the umpteenth time, Mr. Laritate makes her join the "Happy Helpers Club" under the threat of suspension. However, Alex is disgusted when she discovers that the club actually only does mundane everyday tasks for other people (pushing an elevator button, for example) rather than actual good deeds, and that they are only doing said deeds for rewards. Alex talks to her older friend, Maggie, a former hippie (as evidenced by her references to '60s culture), who gives her advice. Meanwhile, Max goes on his first date, and learns the importance of being yourself. Guest stars: Bill Chott as Mr. Laritate, JoAnne Worley as Maggie, Gilland Jones as Jenny, Kathryn Foley as Jeanette, Steve Purnick as store owner
39	18	"Hugh's Not Normous"	Ken Ceizler	Justin Varava	April 12, 2009	216	3.2
Jerry tells Alex that she must be nice to people. When Hugh Normous, a young giant, shows up at the lair, having run away from home, Alex decides to "be nice" by hiding him from her parents while she helps to locate his birth parents. Meanwhile, Max tried to get back at Alex for all her cruel pranks. Guest stars: Josh Sussman as Hugh Normous, Clarinda Ross as Cathy Normous, Lee Reherman as Doug Normous, Christopher Neiman as Stu Fineman, Rose Abdoo as Mary Lou Fineman
40	19	"Don't Rain on Justin's Parade – Earth"	Bob Koherr	Richard Goodman	April 19, 2009	227	3.7
When Justin attempts to use magic to make his mentor Baxter Knight's weather predictions come true, he angers Mother Nature and winds up with his own personal rain cloud. Meanwhile, Alex partners up with Mr. Laritate as Deputy Russo and suddenly turns "good". Justin asks her for help, and the two are lectured by Mother Nature on the importance of helping the environment. Although Baxter ends up fired anyway, Justin is overjoyed seeing his replacement, a beautiful woman. Guest stars: Bill Chott as Mr. Laritate, Jenica Bergere as Mother Nature, Steve Monroe as Baxter Knight, Robert Mammana as Officer Bryan Absent: Maria Canals Barrera as Theresa Russo
41	20	"Family Game Night"	Bob Koherr	Gigi McCreery & Perry Rein	April 26, 2009	218	N/A
In order to pass a history test, Alex switches brains with Harper. There is a glitch, however, and the two cannot switch back. Justin is harassed by a girl, Daphne, who insists they are dating. To drive her away, Justin invites Daphne to Russo Family Game Night, an infamous event that usually "ends in crime scene tape" due to the Russos' loud fighting. Meanwhile, Alex and Harper are still having trouble with the body switching spell – Alex winds up with two brains in her head, while a brainless Harper is left in Alex's bedroom. Needless to say, the game night ends in disaster, much to Justin's delight, and Justin puts Harper's brain back in her head thanks to a simple spell. Guest star: Christa B. Allen as Daphne
42	21	"Justin's New Girlfriend"	Victor Gonzalez	Richard Goodman	May 2, 2009	221	N/A
Justin and Harper bond over a silent movie festival. Alex makes fun of them by saying that they're dating. However, determined to keep her brother and best friend from dating, Alex sabotages their relationship. It all escalates into a black-and-white costumed chase scene, which Alex ends up tired and Justin and Harper win and keep dating.
43	22	"My Tutor, Tutor"	David DeLuise	Vince Cheung & Ben Montanio	May 29, 2009	226	N/A
Jerry hired a wizard tutor for Max named Tutor. Justin and Alex start to befriend Tutor, but when they find out that she is going to leave when Max is done, they purposely cause their little brother to fail just so Tutor will stay. At the end they found out she is a half-elf and that is why they both liked her. Guest stars: Paulina Olszynski as Tutor, Dana Michael Woods as Leprechaun Absent: David DeLuise as Jerry Russo
44	23	"Paint By Committee"	Bob Koherr	Peter Dirksen	June 26, 2009	229	6.0
Alex is chosen to paint a mural for her school. But when the committee pitches ideas that do not match her ideas for the mural she uses magic on the mural so when they look at it they see whatever they want to, but when Justin finds out that Alex used magic he uses magic to put her mural on the wall. The committee is unhappy with her decision, but she says that she is going to go her own way with the mural. Guest stars: Bill Chott as Mr. Laritate, Dan Benson as Zeke, Peter Hulne as Line
45	24	"Wizard for a Day"	Bob Koherr	Justin Varava	July 10, 2009	230	N/A
It is Jerry's birthday so Justin gives him a magical pencil holder and Max was going to go with his annual cat, but decides to go with Justin's pencil sharpener. When Alex looks for a gift better that Justin's she goes to the wizard world and gets Merlin's Hat which grants any wish for a day. Jerry wishes for a box of pencils and for a Milky Way Milkshake from the Asteroid Belt. Alex then thinks that his wishes are silly so she uses the hat to turn the Sub Station into the Asteroid Belt. It brings in a lot of customers and Jerry makes their shift go up and makes them wear goofy costumes. A day later, the aliens heard that the Milky Way Milkshake machine has reopened and wants to take it. Justin then uses one of the alien's laser guns to get rid of Merlin's Hat which makes everything disappear. Guest stars: Dan Benson as Zeke, Amir Talai as Alien
46	25	"Cast-Away (To Another Show)" (Note: Part 1 of "Wizards on Deck with Hannah Montana")	Victor Gonzalez	Peter Murrieta	July 17, 2009	220	9.3
Justin is excited to meet London Tipton when he wins an essay contest prize: a cruise on the SS Tipton. Theresa and Jerry say Alex can't go because of her 14 absent assignments. Alex (who eventually sneaks away, but is caught and agrees to take classes on board) and Max join Justin on board, where Alex bonds with new friend Bailey Pickett. When Alex and Bailey enter a tug of war competition, she tells Bailey to spit on the floor so they win. They end up winning the competition and Hannah Montana tickets to her concert. When Marion Moseby asks for Alex's name since she and Bailey won, she says she is Ashley Olsen. But soon gets in hot water when she uses magic to bring Harper aboard and tells her she is signed up for Marine Biology, where she meets Cody Martin and tells him she's Alex Russo. Justin meets London Tipton while on the cruise and when she asks who he is, Justin says he is Dr. Fossil to not look like a fool. Meanwhile, Max and Zack Martin, (who has developed a massive crush on Alex), compete in a series of outrageous challenges. Alex says that she is Ashley Olsen so she won't get caught skipping classes. But gets caught after mistaking her name and telling Mr. Moseby that her real name is Ashley Simpson. Also starring: Cole Sprouse as Cody Martin, Dylan Sprouse as Zack Martin, Brenda Song as London Tipton, Debby Ryan as Bailey Pickett, Phill Lewis as Mr. Marion Moseby Note: This episode is part of the beginning of Wizards on Deck with Hannah Montana and is a crossover with The Suite Life on Deck.
47	26	"Wizards vs. Vampires on Waverly Place"	Victor Gonzalez	Peter Murrieta	July 24, 2009	223	5.0
When a new sandwich shop (the Late Nite Bite) opens in Waverly Place, Justin falls in love with the owner's daughter, Juliet Van Heusen. But when the Russos finds out that the Van Heusens are vampires, both parents forbid them from dating. Meanwhile, Alex tries to get rid of Max because of his annoying impressions by sending him to an underwater camp for the summer, but her plan blows up when Justin finally tells his parents about him and Juliet. In the end, both sets of parents allow their children to date each other. Guest stars: Bridgit Mendler as Juliet Van Heusen, JD Cullum as Alucard Van Heusen, Anne Ramsay as Cindy Van Heusen Notes: The version available on iTunes and Disney+ has scenes deleted from the episode, such as Max's Jack Nicholson, Dr. Evil and Jerry Seinfeld impersonations, and Justin and Juliet's cemetery date. When this episode was broadcast on Disney Channel Middle East, this episode had some scenes deleted and as a result, the running time of the episode was 23 minutes instead of 38 minutes. Also for a couple of Season 1 episodes you can see The Late Night Bight in the background.
48	27	"Wizards vs. Vampires: Tasty Bites"	Mark Cendrowski	Justin Varava	July 31, 2009	224	4.8
When Juliet comes over for dinner at the Russo's, she convinces them that vampires are "health" conscious, so they start eating healthy. Upset about the healthiness, Alex and Harper both get part-time shifts at the Late Nite Bite where they overhear Alucard & Cindy talk about how younger vampires get humans to eat healthy before drinking their "delicious" blood. Alex runs off and tells Justin. Juliet knows her parents' plot of biting Alex. When Justin, Juliet, Theresa and Jerry intervene, Max comes in covered in pumpkin, the smell of which is offensive to vampires. Then Juliet explains a vampire's "Worst Fear." Guest stars: Bridgit Mendler as Juliet Van Heusen, JD Cullum as Alucard Van Heusen, Anne Ramsay as Cindy Van Heusen
49	28	"Wizards vs. Vampires: Dream Date"	Bob Koherr	Gigi McCreery & Perry Rein	August 7, 2009	225	5.0
When Dean moves away, Alex decides to show up in Dean's dreams. A few months later he comes back. When Alex goes on their date, Dean pays more attention to the arcade than her, and Alex attempts to break up with him. She pretends to be a slob so that Dean breaks up with her, but he said it was no big deal after she blurted it out. Alex goes into his dreams one more time to find out how Dean really feels. Meanwhile, when Juliet asks Justin to go on vacation with her and her family, he doesn't want to go and lies to her. Guest stars: Bridgit Mendler as Juliet Van Heusen, Daniel Samonas as Dean, Amanda Tepe as Hot Dog Vendor Absent: Maria Canals Barrera as Theresa Russo
50	29	"Wizards and Vampires vs. Zombies"	Victor Gonzalez	Gigi McCreery & Perry Rein	August 8, 2009	228	N/A
Justin promises Juliet an unforgettable prom date. But when Alex organizes a zombie-themed anti-prom, Alex gives Max flyers to hand out and he accidentally sends the zombie prom flyers to the wizard world with a permission slip to test out a no fear ring, and real zombies arrive. Meanwhile, Harper and Zeke go to the prom together. At the prom Justin serenades Juliet and asks her to go steady with him. After that Max, Alex, Harper, Justin, Zeke, and Juliet get in a dance off with the zombies to get them to leave. In the end Justin and Juliet have a special moment together, slow dancing and kissing after Juliet agrees to go steady with Justin. Guest stars: Dan Benson as Zeke, Bridgit Mendler as Juliet Van Heusen Absent: Maria Canals Barrera as Theresa Russo
51	30	"Retest"	Victor Gonzalez	Todd J. Greenwald	August 21, 2009	222	3.9
Jerry and his siblings, Kelbo and Megan (Jerry revealed to the kids they have an aunt), need to retake the Wizard test that, in their teen years, determined who got to keep their powers. Unfortunately, Megan still has a grudge over Jerry, and nothing, neither the possibility of getting her powers back or her niece and nephew's happiness can persuade her to redo the test. When Alex, Justin and Max see how competitive the contest gets, they realize the same test could eventually tear their family apart as well. Through the entire episode, each one of them gets compared to a relative (Max to Kelbo, Alex to Megan, Justin to their dad, and Harper to their mom). In the end, Justin says Alex is nothing like Megan, because Alex apologized and that's something Megan never learned to do. Guest stars: Jeff Garlin as Uncle Kelbo, Carrie Genzel as Megan Notes: This episode originally aired on July 23, 2009 on Disney Channel Latin America, almost a month before it aired in the United States. This is the last episode to be broadcast in standard definition.
