= The Suite Life Sets Sail =

- The Suite Life on Deck episode
- Cody, Zack and Carey meet London and Mr. Moseby on the S.S. Tipton.
- Episode no.: Season 1 Episode 1
- Directed by: Jim Drake
- Written by: Danny Kallis; Pamela Eells O'Connell
- Production code: 101
- Original air date: September 19, 2008 (UK) September 26, 2008 (U.S.)
- Running time: 23 minutes

Guest appearances
- Erin Cardillo; Tiya Sircar; Matthew Timmons; Ginette Rhodes; Kim Rhodes

Episode chronology
← Previous —	Next → "Parrot Island"

"The Suite Life Sets Sail" is the pilot episode of the Disney Channel teen sitcom The Suite Life on Deck, a sequel/spin-off to the Disney Channel sitcom The Suite Life of Zack & Cody. Debby Ryan joins the cast as Bailey Pickett, who becomes a close friend of Zack's, the girlfriend of Cody, and the roommate of London, as well as Ashley Tisdale leaving the main cast due to her character Maddie Fitzpatrick having to attend college.

After an original sequel named Arwin! was not picked up by Disney Channel, the creators decided to change the concept. The series premiere in the United States drew 5.7 million viewers, and it became the most watched pilot in Canada and on Family Channel. This also outpaced veteran series Hannah Montana and Wizards of Waverly Place with the ratings.

== Plot ==
Hotel heiress London Tipton (Brenda Song) and twins Zack (Dylan Sprouse) and Cody Martin (Cole Sprouse) are to attend a new semester in Seven Seas High School on the SS Tipton, a cruise ship owned by Wilfred Tipton (voiced by Bob Joles and played by Adam Tait in The Suite Life of Zack & Cody; played by John Michael Higgins in the special The Suite Life on Deck episode "Twister"). (which was seen in one episode of the predecessor). Meanwhile, Mr. Moseby (Phill Lewis) tricks London into thinking that she is on vacation (which is not true), and a girl named Bailey Pickett sneaks into the bathrooms to disguise herself as a male, doing so since there are no more cabins left for women. London bribes her roommate Padma (Tiya Sircar) into leaving, so she can have the room to herself, and soon finds out she has to attend school.

Cody ends up sharing a room with Woody Fink (Matthew Timmons), who is very messy, while Zack eventually is with Bailey (Debby Ryan) (currently disguised as male, trying to hide her identity). The twins decide to exchange roommates, but Zack in the end refuses after finding out she is a girl. However, her gender is eventually revealed to the people on the ship, and is happy to find out that the cabin from London is free for one more person, but this is the last straw for London, and she flees to Parrot Island via helicopter, leaving the plot for the following episode, prompting Moseby to jump out of the ship in the process.

== Starring ==
Main Actor/Actress	Character
Cole Sprouse	Cody Martin
Dylan Sprouse	Zack Martin
Brenda Song	London Tipton
Debby Ryan	Bailey Pickett
Phill Lewis	Mr. Moseby

== Guest starring ==
- Erin Cardillo as Emma Tutweiller: Zack, Cody, London, Bailey and Woody's teacher for the semester on board.
- Tiya Sircar as Padma: London's previous roommate whom she tricked into leaving.
- Matthew Timmons as Woody Fink: Cody's roommate and a frequent guest star on the show.
- Kim Rhodes as Carey Martin: Zack and Cody's mom who only has a cameo in this episode and appears in later episodes.

== Reception ==
The series premiere attracted more than a million people on the night it first premiered.
