= Prachi Save Saathi =

Indian dancer, actress, and voice-dubbing actress

- Other names: Prachi Save Sathi; Prachi Saathi; Prachi Save; Prachi Sathi; Prachi Savey
- Occupations: Dancer; voice actress; actress
- Years active: 1992–current
- Website: prachisaathi.in

Prachi Save Saathi (Prācī Sēva Sāthī) is an Indian dancer, actress, and voice-dubbing actress.

She is the official Hindi dubbing voice for Disney character, Minnie Mouse. She is a trained Bharatnatyam dancer.

== Career ==
She acted as a child artist in the 1994 Hindi movie Karamati Coat. She has been a model and a television anchor.

Prachi has Hindi voice-dubbed over 200 character roles in foreign animation media in the Indian dubbing industry. She has been voice-acting since 1992, and voiced the character of Krishna in the 3D animated movie Krishna Aur Kans (2012).

She is the official Hindi speaking voice for Disney character Minnie Mouse in India (with Parignya Pandya Shah as Minnie's Hindi singing voice) and is approved as the Hindi voice artist for Brenda Song's role as London Tipton from The Suite Life of Zack & Cody. She also performed over Hindi voice-over roles such as Dennis Mitchell from Dennis the Menace, George Little from Stuart Little, Emily Elizabeth Howard from Clifford the Big Red Dog and Clifford's Puppy Days, Vicky the Robot from Small Wonder, Darby and Piglet from My Friends Tigger & Pooh, Lagoona Blue from Monster High, and also Alice from Alice in Wonderland in both live action and animated.

She also known for being the Hindi dubbing voice for Georgie Henley's role as Lucy Pevensie in The Chronicles of Narnia film series.

Prachi is also a Bharatanatyam dancer. She trained under Guru Lata Raman for more than eight years. She has been awarded with titles Shringarmani, Nritya Shiromani, Girnar Ratna, and Nalanda Nritya Nipuna. Her dance performances include When Walls Dance, a blend of Bharatanatyam, animation and tribal Warli art, Ashtaleela, an interpretation of Ashtanayikas, and the film Raftaar Karo Kam.

== Filmography ==
Title	Role	Language	Episodes	Airdate	Notes
Little Krishna	Lord Krishna	Hindi	13	5 November 2009	Animated series aired on Nickelodeon India.
Krishna Aur Kans	Krishna	Hindi		2012	Animated film
Pardes	Daksha	Hindi		1997	Bollywood drama film

== Dubbing roles ==
=== Animated series ===
Program title	Original voice	Character	Dub language	Original language	Number of episodes	Original airdate	Dubbed airdate	Notes
Johnny Bravo	Mae Whitman	Little Suzy	Hindi	English	67	July 14, 1997 – August 27, 2004	August 22, 1999	Hired by Cartoon Network and dubbed by Sound & Vision India.
Clifford the Big Red Dog	Grey DeLisle	Emily Elizabeth Howard	Hindi	English	65	9/4/2000- 25 February 2003		Aired on Pogo.
Clifford's Puppy Days	Grey DeLisle	Emily Elizabeth Howard	Hindi	English	39	9/15/2003- 13 October 2004		Spinoff prequel series of Clifford the Big Red Dog. Aired on Pogo.
My Friends Tigger & Pooh	Chloë Grace Moretz Travis Oates	Darby Piglet	Hindi	English	66	5/12/2007-10/9/2010		
Mickey Mouse Works	Russi Taylor	Minnie Mouse	Hindi	English	27	5/1/1999- 1/6/2001		
House of Mouse	Russi Taylor	Minnie Mouse	Hindi	English	52	1/13/2001- 19 December 2003		
Mickey Mouse Clubhouse	Russi Taylor	Minnie Mouse	Hindi	English	105	5/6/2006-12/27/2013		
Minnie's Bow-Toons	Russi Taylor	Minnie Mouse	Hindi	English	15	11/14/2011- 12/3/2013	3/19/2012-2014	2–5 minute series. Spinoff of Mickey Mouse Clubhouse.
Stuart Little	Myles Jeffrey	George Little	Hindi	English	13	3/1/2003-9/24/2003		
Dennis the Menace	Unknown	Dennis Mitchell	Hindi	English	Unknown			
Avatar: The Last Airbender	Zach Tyler Eisen	Aang	Hindi	English	61	2/21/2005- 19 July 2008		
Monster High	Laura Bailey	Lagoona Blue	Hindi	English		2010–		A series full of webisodes and TV specials based on the Mattel toy franchise.
Mighty Cat Masked Niyandar	Mayumi Asano	Nyago / Niyandar	Hindi	Japanese		2/6/2000-9/30/2001		
Pokémon	Fushigi Yamada (JP); Amy Birnhaum (Seasons 5–8); Kayzie Rogers (Season 9) (EN)	Max (Masato) (First Dub)	Hindi	Japanese	1000+	4/1/1997-Current	First Dub 5/12/2003-2015 (India); 2004-2013 (Pakistan) second dub 5/19/2014-Current	A second Hindi dub has been produced by UTV Software Communications featuring a new Hindi voice cast and translation and aired on Hungama TV. The first dub Sathi was involved in, was produced by Crest and then by Sound & Vision India for Cartoon Network India, Cartoon Network Pakistan and Pogo. Child voice actor Tirthankar Mitra previously voiced this character in earlier episodes before Prachi took over after he left to do his studies. Amit Diondyi voiced this character in the second Hindi dub.
Monsuno	Karen Strassman	Jinja	Hindi	English	65	23 February 2012 – 1 July 2014		

=== Live action television series ===
Program title	Actor/Actress	Character	Dub language	Original language	Episodes	Original airdate	Dubbed airdate	Notes
Small Wonder	Tiffany Brissette	Victoria "Vicki" Ann Smith-Lawson	Hindi	English	96	9/7/1985-5/20/1989	1994–1998	Aired on Star Plus from 1994 to 1998.
The Suite Life of Zack & Cody	Brenda Song	London Tipton	Hindi	English	87	3/18/2005-9/1/2008		
The Suite Life on Deck	Brenda Song	London Tipton	Hindi	English	71	9/26/2008-5/6/2011	1/30/2009-2012(?)	
That's So Suite Life of Hannah Montana	Brenda Song	London Tipton	Hindi	English	1	28 June 2006	Unknown	A crossover special of three consistent Disney Channel sitcoms That's So Raven, The Suite Life of Zack & Cody, and Hannah Montana.
Wizards on Deck with Hannah Montana	Brenda Song	London Tipton	Hindi	English	1	17 July 2009 (US); 24 July 2009 (CAN)	6 December 2009	A crossover special of three consistent Disney Channel sitcoms Wizards of Waverly Place, The Suite Life on Deck, and Hannah Montana. This special aired in India first, before the US premiere.

=== Live action films ===
Film title	Actor/Actress	Character	Dub language	Original language	Original Year release	Dub Year release	Notes
Dennis the Menace	Mason Gamble	Dennis Mitchell	Hindi	English	1993		
The Sixth Sense	Haley Joel Osment	Cole Sear (Second Dub)	Hindi	English	1999	2005	Dubbed for television broadcasting on UTV.
Sooryavansham	Aanand Vardhan	Sonu	Hindi	Hindi	1999		
Stuart Little	Jonathan Lipnicki	George Little	Hindi	English	1999	1999	
Stuart Little 2	Jonathan Lipnicki	George Little	Hindi	English	2002	2002	
The Mummy Returns	Freddie Boath	Alex	Hindi	English	2001	2001	
Home Alone: Taking Back The House	Mike Weinberg	Kevin McCallister	Hindi	English	2002	Unknown	Released outside of North America as simply Home Alone 4.
Zathura: A Space Adventure	Jonah Bobo	Danny Budwing	Hindi	English	2005	2006	
The Chronicles of Narnia: The Lion, The Witch and the Wardrobe	Georgie Henley	Lucy Pevensie	Hindi	English	2005	2005	The elderly version of Lucy was portrayed by Rachael Henley and was Hindi dubbed by Pinky Rajput. Performed alongside Ankur Javeri who voiced William Moseley as Peter Pevensie in Hindi.
The Chronicles of Narnia: Prince Caspian	Georgie Henley	Lucy Pevensie	Hindi	English	2008	2008	Prachi's name was mentioned on the Hindi dub credits of the DVD release of the film. She was credited as Prachi Saathi.
The Chronicles of Narnia: The Voyage of the Dawn Treader	Georgie Henley	Lucy Pevensie	Hindi	English	2010	2010	Prachi's name was mentioned on the Hindi dub credits of the DVD release of the film, also containing the Tamil and Telugu credits. She was credited as Prachi Satthi.
Alice in Wonderland	Mia Wasikowska	Alice Kingsleigh	Hindi	English	2010	2010	
The Golden Compass	Dakota Blue Richards	Lyra Belacqua	Hindi	English	2007	2007	
The Haunting Hour: Don't Think About It	Alex Winzenread	Max Keller	Hindi	English	2007	2007	
Cats & Dogs	–	Minor Characters	Hindi	English	2001	2001	
The Karate Kid	Jaden Smith	Dre Parker (First Dub)	Hindi	English	2010	2010	On June 25, 2011, A Second Hindi dub was made for UTV Action produced in-house by UTV Software Communications.
The Suite Life Movie	Brenda Song	London Tipton	Hindi	English	2011	2011	
The Tower	Jo Min-ah	Lee Ha-na	Hindi	Korean	2012	2013	Dubbed by Visual Reality into American English, Indian English and Hindi.
Inspector Gadget	Michelle Trachtenberg	Penny Brown	Hindi	English	1999	1999	
Inspector Gadget 2	Caitlin Wachs	Penny	Hindi	English	2003	2003	
Theri	Baby Nainika	Young Niveditha (Nivi)	Hindi	Tamil	2016	2017	Performed alongside Shanoor Mirza who voiced Vijay as DCP Vijaykumar/Joseph Kuruvilla (Joseph Cardos in Hindi version)/Dharmeshwar and Muskaan Jafri who voiced Amy Jackson as Annie in Hindi.
Theri	Divya Saasha	Teenage Niveditha	Hindi	Tamil	2016	2017	Performed alongside Shanoor Mirza who voiced Vijay as DCP Vijaykumar/Joseph Kuruvilla (Joseph Cardos in Hindi version)/Dharmeshwar and Muskaan Jafri who voiced Amy Jackson as Annie in Hindi.
Jersey	Ronit Kamra	Nani (Johnny in Hindi version)	Hindi	Telugu	2019	2019	Performed alongside Shanoor Mirza who voiced Nani as Arjun and Muskaan Jafri who voiced Shraddha Srinath as Sara in Hindi.

=== Animated films ===
Film title	Original voice	Character	Dub language	Original language	Original Year release	Dub Year release	Notes
An American Tail	Phillip Glasser	Fievel Mousekewitz	Hindi	English	1986	2004	
Barbie as Rapunzel	Chantal Strand	Princess Katrina (Kelly)	Hindi	English	2002	2002	This was Kelly's character in the film. Kelly's Hindi voice was provided by Urvi Ashar and both of their names were mentioned in the Hindi dubbing credits that were shown after the original ending credits.
Alice in Wonderland	Kathryn Beaumont	Alice	Hindi	English	1951	2011	
The Black Cauldron	Susan Sheridan	Princess Eilonwy	Hindi	English	1985		
The Little Mermaid	Jodi Benson	Ariel (Second Dub)	Hindi	English	1989	2013	
Mickey's Once Upon a Christmas	Russi Taylor	Minnie Mouse	Hindi	English	1999		

== See also ==
- Javed Jaffrey – Official Hindi dubbing voice for Mickey Mouse and Goofy.
- Vinay Nadkarni – Official Hindi dubbing voice for Donald Duck.
