= The Fairest of Them All =

The Fairest of Them All may refer to:

- "Mirror, Mirror on the wall. Who is the fairest of them all?", a dialogue spoken by the Evil Queen in the German fairy tale Snow White
- The Fairest of Them All (album), a 1970 album by Dolly Parton
- "The Fairest of Them All" (The Suite Life of Zack & Cody), a television episode
- "The Fairest of Them All", an episode of the Indian adaptation The Suite Life of Karan & Kabir
- "Fairest of Them All", a 2014 fan-produced Star Trek episode
