= List of recurring characters in The Suite Life on Deck =

The following is a list of recurring, minor characters, in the Disney Channel Original Series, The Suite Life on Deck. This article also includes Marcus Little, who was a main character in season 2 of the series.

== Overview ==
Portrayed by	Character	The Suite Life of Zack & Cody			The Suite Life on Deck			The Suite Life Movie
Portrayed by	Character	Season 1	Season 2	Season 3	Season 1	Season 2	Season 3	The Suite Life Movie
Cole Sprouse	Cody Martin	Main	Main	Main	Main	Main	Main	Main
Dylan Sprouse	Zack Martin	Main	Main	Main	Main	Main	Main	Main
Brenda Song	London Tipton	Main	Main	Main	Main	Main	Main	Main
Ashley Tisdale	Maddie Fitzpatrick	Main	Main	Main	Guest			
Phill Lewis	Marion Moseby	Main	Main	Main	Main	Main	Main	Main
Kim Rhodes	Carey Martin	Main	Main	Main	Guest		Guest	
Debby Ryan	Bailey Pickett				Main	Main	Main	Main
Doc Shaw	Marcus Little					Main	Main	
Matthew Timmons	Woody Fink				Recurring	Recurring	Recurring	Main
John Ducey	Dr. Donald Spaulding							Main
Matthew Glave	Dr. Ronald Olsen							Main

== Main characters ==
=== Marcus Little ===
Marcus Little
- The Suite Life on Deck character
- First appearance: "Roomies" (2009)
- Last appearance: "Bon Voyage" (2010)
- Created by: Danny Kallis; Pamela Eells O'Connell
- Portrayed by: Doc Shaw

In-universe information
- Alias: Lil' Little
- Nickname: Marcus Lou
- Gender: Male
- Occupation: Student, model, rapper, singer, song-writer, musician, record producer, director, creator, illustrator, reality star, playwright
- Family: Unnamed father Unnamed mother

Marcus Little first appears in the episode "Roomies". A former rapping sensation called Lil' Little, he comes aboard the SS Tipton to attend Seven Seas High School and is assigned as Zack Martin's roommate. Marcus lived in Atlanta, Georgia as mentioned on his sash in "The Beauty and the Fleeced" and unfortunately lost his fame and career after his voice deepened.

Marcus has a crush on London Tipton, and is shown to be quite gullible, often believing Woody Fink's tall tales. Like London, he also has many famous contacts, but he is sensitive about the loss of his fame because he believes that his celebrity friends won't like him. However, he is later proven wrong by Jordin Sparks in the episode "Crossing Jordin".

In "Breakup in Paris", Marcus gets a surprise by a boy named Dante who is posing as him at a CD signing. Marcus and Dante argue over who's the real Lil' Little, but the crowd believes Dante because of a nearby lifesize cut-out. Later Marcus and Dante both sing at a Lil' Little concert. Mr. Moseby recognizes Marcus as the real Lil' Little and gets recognized himself, ending up with the crowd beating him with a bicycle, as pointed out by London afterwards. Marcus tells Dante they should work together someday. Later in "My, Oh Maya", Dante comes back pointing out he is a stowaway that got on the boat with a rope.

In the Season 3 episode "Das Boots", it is revealed that Marcus has extremely poor gameplay towards chess (despite winning a match after Cody opts to help Zack who is trapped in a submarine with minutes of air left) and that his grandfather only talks about the bus schedule. Marcus makes his final appearance in "Bon Voyage". At the end of this episode, he leaves the ship after he discovers that he will make a rap opera inspired by his one-hit song, in a fashion similar to Green Day's rock opera American Idiot based on their album of the same title, which he says was the inspiration for why he wanted to do it. Marcus quotes that he and his family will move to New York City so that Marcus can perform in his Broadway musical Retainer Baby.

== Supporting characters ==
=== Woody Fink ===
Woodrow "Woody" Fink (Matthew Timmons) from Cleveland, Ohio, is Cody Martin's cabin-mate on the SS Tipton. He is known for being messy, disorganized, gullible, dimwitted, lazy, gluttonous and having bad grades at school. His catchphrases are "Hurtful!" and "Dang it!" In "Flowers and Chocolate", Woody had a huge crush on London's best friend Chelsea Brimmer and he pretended to be London's butler from England. Woody also directs, does make-up and hair and guards the studio for London's web show "Yay Me! Starring London Tipton". Woody also can direct passed wind to sound like different songs. In the episode "Sea Monster Mash", he mentions that he has brothers and friends off the ship that aren't smart. It is also revealed that he has a younger sister who is much bigger than he is. However, in "Bermuda Triangle," he states that, "Being the youngest of 9, I learned to grab first and worry about utensils later, you wouldn't know, being an 'only child.'" Also, his younger sister Willa visited the ship at one point. In a few episodes of the series (International Dateline, Goin' Bananas, Marriage 101) he has been interested in a female student named Addison who has also shown possible interest in him. He then went out with a girl named Becky in Smarticle Particles. In Rat Tale after he gets bitten by Buck (Cody and Bailey's pet rat) he thinks he mutates into a human-rat hybrid and later he saves Buck from falling off of an extremely high place, and does amazing acrobatic feats. Addison and Woody become a couple in several episodes. Of all recurring characters, Woody appears in the most episodes (48 out of the show's 71 episodes).

=== Emma Tutweiller ===
Emma Tutweiller (Erin Cardillo) is one of the teachers at Seven Seas High, the school on board the SS Tipton. Commonly referred to as Miss Tutweiller, Emma is very enthusiastic about her job but is often frustrated by both Cody and Bailey (her best students) and Zack, London, and Woody (whom she considers her worst students). In several episodes, Emma has been shown to have self-esteem and/or relationship issues; a running gag has her abruptly making comments or outbursts about various failed relationships while speaking to the kids, often causing her embarrassment. Mr. Moseby dated her in the episode "seaHarmony" and has a crush on her, as became clear in "The Play's The Thing", when he tried to make her love him using Zack's help, although it was already suggested that Mr. Moseby and Emma would become a couple as he fantasized about her in a showgirl costume after she stepped in once as a showgirl in the episode "Show and Tell". London and Bailey also began suspecting them to be a couple in the same episode. Emma is also very fond of cats; in the third season it was revealed that she keeps at least 31 Siamese cats in her cabin. In "Prom Night", she and Moseby are confirmed to be dating. Miss Tutweiller did not have her own prom on the show, but she said that she ripped a tiara off a blond haired girl to get a tiara for prom. In the episode "Graduation on Deck", Mr. Moseby proposes to her, she accepts and the two become engaged. She appears in 23 episodes.

=== Kirby Morris ===
Kirby Morris (Windell D. Middlebrooks) is the ship's security guard and he is friends with Zack and Cody. He first appeared in "Showgirls". He loves to eat junk food and can not get enough of it. Kirby never finished high school, so Zack and Cody help him study for the GED test, allowing him to graduate. He then suffered through test anxiety as he couldn't get past the first question which was "Put name here". He played arena football and is a friend of Kurt Warner. (He also bit Warner's leg. "But I spit it back out", he says on the subject.) In "Any Given Fantasy", he coached Cody in football. In "Seven Seas News", he had a television show which was called Boat Cops. which was exclusively made for the SS Tipton guests. In "Rat Tale", it is shown he likes rats and mice as he cares about Buck (Cody and Bailey's pet rat) after Bailey and Cody had an argument about who gets Buck. He is shown to love grilled cheese sandwiches. Despite not appearing again for the rest of the series, he is mentioned once more in the episode, "My, Oh Maya".

=== Maya Bennett ===
Maya Elizabeth Bennett (Zoey Deutch) is one of the ship's waitresses and helps Zack serve drinks. Zack has an obvious crush on her and she reciprocates but plays hard-to-get due to his 'hit-on-every-girl' attitude. She becomes the target of Zack's modified 6-month plan, originally designed by Cody. Zack eventually becomes friends with her due to receiving advice from Cody to be just friends first, then move on later. Maya catches on easily, as shown in My, Oh Maya, where after being on the SS Tipton for a single day, she already knows that Zack hits on every girl on the ship. In Das Boots when Woody, London, Zack and Maya become trapped in London's shoe submarine and when they are all about to die because of the lack of oxygen, Maya admits she really likes Zack too. When Cody rescues the group, Maya explains that she is not yet ready to become Zack's long-term girlfriend. In "My, Oh Maya", it is revealed that she is from New York City. In Party On! Zack throws Maya a surprise birthday party, which results in the pair sharing a kiss. It is also revealed in that episode that Maya is born sometime between March and June, and that she is a huge fan of Sean Kingston. In "Love and War", Maya has become Zack's girlfriend. She breaks up with him in Graduation On Deck because she joined The Peace Corps and has been assigned to Chad but couldn't have a long distance relationship with Zack due to Chad's bad infrastructure. He is very hurt by her leaving. After Maya tries to comfort him, he responds saying, "No, I am not your 'baby' anymore" and goes off. He is heartbroken and almost doesn't go to graduation because of it. When his dad helps him though, Zack goes to graduation and at the end is seen hugging Maya, showing that they are friends despite the break-up.

=== Addison ===
Addison (Rachael Kathryn Bell) is a student at Seven Seas High and a friend of Bailey's as shown in the episode "Roomies". She is very hyperactive and addicted to candy, thus often talks very rapidly and in a rambling fashion that sometimes confuses other people. She appeared in the episodes "International Dateline", "Kitchen Casanova", "Goin' Bananas", "Marriage 101", "The Play's the Thing", "Prom Night" and "Graduation on Deck", and she was also mentioned in the episode "Flowers and Chocolate". In the episode "Goin' Bananas" it was shown that Addison also has a terrible fear of ping-pong balls (even after she got help with Mr. Blanket though says she played one round of ping-pong and only cried twice).

Throughout her appearances on the show Addison and Woody have shown an attraction to each other. In the episode "Kitchen Casanova" Woody would take a home economics class in order to be close to her, and in "Goin' Bananas" they briefly end up dating via their characters in an online role-playing game without realizing it. In "Marriage 101" Addison marries Woody for a class assignment and Marcus became their baby. She also shows that she is good at arm wrestling and apparently weighs 83 pounds. She was Woody's date to Seven Seas High's senior prom, officially becoming his girlfriend afterwards, and would graduate with the rest of the class in the final episode "Graduation on Deck".

=== Carey Martin ===
Carey Martin (Kim Rhodes) is Zack and Cody's mother and a singer. She appeared on the first episode "The Suite Life Sets Sail" and has since appeared in "Mom and Dad on Deck", "Trouble in Tokyo" and "Graduation on Deck". She was also a main character on The Suite Life of Zack & Cody.

=== Kurt Martin ===
Kurt Martin (Robert Torti) is Zack and Cody's father and a rockstar. He appeared on "Mom and Dad on Deck" and "Graduation On Deck".

=== Mrs. Pepperman ===
Mrs. Pepperman (Lillian Adams) has appeared in three episodes. She first appeared in "Parrot Island" in the group of people that was angry for going to Parrot Island instead of Europe. She later appeared in "International Dateline" as a member of the senior citizens karate class. She was in the senior citizens activities class in "The Wrong Stuff". When things don't go her way she says a long and annoying "NOOOOOOO". She has only been in season 1, but is mentioned throughout the series.

=== Mr. Blanket ===
Mr. Blanket (Michael Hitchcock) is the guidance counselor at Seven Seas High and the ship's resident psychologist—he even wrote a book on counseling, though he has never actually studied psychology. He is known for his extremely unorthodox approaches to helping people with their issues, which he refers to as "the Blanket Method" where he does bizarre things like handcuffing Zack and Mr. Moseby to each other (this has often caused people such as Zack and London to call him crazy), but he has successfully helped various people on the SS Tipton deal with their problems. He is good at making dolls and once made dolls of Zack, Mr. Moseby, and Ms. Tutweiller (whom he has a crush on). He is obsessed with cupcakes. In the episode "The Defiant Ones" he falls off the ship, though he would later reappear in the episode "Mean Chicks". Mr. Blanket also has an addiction to sniffing rabbits. His degree is on the other side of a menu. Ms. Tutweiller filed a restraining order against him and is required to come "no closer than 100 feet".

=== Arwin Hawkhauser ===
Arwin Hawkhauser is the kooky stationary engineer at the Tipton Hotel. He is a friend of Zack and Cody's and has a crush on their mother. He appears in the episodes "Computer Date", "It's All Greek to Me", and "Graduation on Deck". As shown in the episode "It's All Greek to Me", Arwin has an identical cousin named Milos (also played by Stepanek) who lives in Greece.

=== Mrs. Gergely ===
Mrs. Gergely (uncredited), is an elderly passenger on the SS Tipton. She first appeared in the first-season episode "seaHarmony" and has appeared numerous times since. Her name was revealed to be Mrs. Gergely in the season 2 episode "London's Apprentice". She is most often seen in the background or when hitting someone with her purse, after they have said something that offends her or touched and or hurt her. She has apparently been a constant passenger on the SS Tipton throughout the series; in the third-season episode The Ghost and Mr. Martin, Zack remarks to her "When are you getting off this boat?!" She then turns to the person next to her and gasps.

=== Moose ===
Moose (Hutch Dano) is Bailey's ex-boyfriend before she left Kansas. In Mulch Ado About Nothing, London invites Moose to the ship so Bailey isn't as homesick, and that was making Cody angry. After Moose becomes elected to receive the Mulch Crown, he asks Bailey to return to Kansas, which upsets Cody. Cody then convinces a confused Bailey to follow her heart, and in turn, causes her to reject Moose's invite, saying he is too bossy and thinks what is right for her, which it isn't. In "Twister: Part 2", Cody and Moose compete to win Bailey back. When Bailey gets a dream of The Wizard of Oz, Moose is portrayed as the Scarecrow and when the group comes to a crossroad, Zack, a flying monkey servant to the Wicked Witch of the West and Woody, the Cowardly Lion (although he thinks he is Chewbacca from Star Wars) outnumber Cody, the Tin Man, on where they should go. Cody tells the group that Bailey hasn't made up her mind and, like in "Mulch to Do About Nothing", convinces Bailey to follow her heart. Bailey wakes up from the dream and tells Moose that he is a great guy, but her heart still belongs to Cody.

=== Tom ===
Tom is a crew member who works at the juice bar with Zack. He has few appearances in the show and few speaking parts.

=== Frankie ===
Frankie (Lisa K. Wyatt) is a crew member and handyman on the ship. She got her first appearance in Bon Voyage and her last appearance was on Graduation On Deck. She really wants to be the next "Mrs. Tipton". Frankie fixes the problems on the S.S. Tipton, she is not exactly the brightest out of the bunch but, when there is a problem with or on the ship, she is the girl to call.

== Character appearances ==
This table includes only characters that have appeared in more than one episode. They are not necessarily recurring characters.

Character	Portrayed by	Season 1	Season 2	Season 3	First appearance	Last appearance
Woody Fink	Matthew Timmons	11	17	20	The Suite Life Sets Sail	Graduation on Deck
Emma Tutweiller	Erin Cardillo	7	9	7	The Suite Life Sets Sail	Graduation on Deck
Carey Martin	Kim Rhodes	2	0	2	The Suite Life Sets Sail	Graduation on Deck
Padma	Tiya Sircar	2	0	0	The Suite Life Sets Sail	The Mommy and the Swami
Mrs. Pepperman	Lillian Adams	4	0	0	Parrot Island	The Wrong Stuff
Kirby Morris	Windell Middlebrooks	4	5	1	Showgirls	Rat Tale
Addison	Rachael Kathryn Bell	1	3	3	International Dateline	Graduation on Deck
Holden	Chad Duell	2	0	0	International Dateline	Boo You
Arwin Hawkhauser	Brian Stepanek	1	0	2	It's All Greek to Me	Graduation on Deck
Connie	Jennifer Tisdale	2	0	0	Flowers and Chocolate	Cruisin' for a Bruisin'
Mrs. Gergely	(unknown)	5	6	3	Flowers and Chocolate	Frozen
Mr. Blanket	Michael Hitchcock	0	3	0	Goin' Bananas	Mean Chicks
Dante	Larry Vanburen Jr.	0	1	1	Breakup in Paris	My Oh Maya
Maya Bennett	Zoey Deutch	0	0	7	My, Oh Maya	Graduation on Deck
The Mirror	Michael Airington	0	1	1	Once Upon a Suite Life	A London Carol
Coco The Party Panda	TBA	0	1	1	Mother of the Groom	Party On!
Moose	Hutch Dano	1	0	1	Mulch Ado About Nothing	Twister: Part 2
Eunice Pickett	Ginette Rhodes	1	0	2	The Suite Life Sets Sail	Twister: Part 3
Frankie	Lisa K. Wyatt	0	0	2	Bon Voyage	Graduation on Deck
Kurt Martin	Robert Torti	1	0	1	Mom and Dad on Deck	Graduation on Deck
