= Vinay Nadkarni =

Indian banker and voice actor

- विनय नाडकर्णी
- Born: Vinay Vivek Nadkarni; 20 March 1962 (age 64); Mumbai, India
- Occupations: Banker; Voice Actor
- Father: Vivek Pandurang Nadkarni

Vinay Nadkarni (Hindi:विनय नाडकर्णी Vinay Nadkaranī, born: 1962) is an Indian banker at Mumbai, and a voice actor that specializes in dubbing foreign animated media.

He is best known for being the official Hindi dubbing voice of Disney character, Donald Duck and he has been voicing him since 1992. In an interview with IANS, he said that he has been 'quacking' since childhood as a hobby.

== Dubbing roles ==
=== Animated series ===
Program title	Original voice	Character	Dub language	Original language	Number of episodes	Original airdate	Dubbed airdate	Notes
Mickey Mouse Works	Tony Anselmo	Donald Duck	Hindi	English	27	5/1/1999- 10/7/2000		
House of Mouse	Tony Anselmo	Donald Duck	Hindi	English	52	1/13/2001- 10/24/2003		
Mickey Mouse Clubhouse	Tony Anselmo	Donald Duck	Hindi	English	99	5/6/2006- 12/27/2013		

=== Animated films ===
Film title	Original voice	Character	Dub language	Original language	Original Year Release	Dub Year Release	Notes
Mickey, Donald, Goofy: The Three Musketeers	Tony Anselmo	Donald Duck	Hindi	English	2004	2004	

== See also ==
- Dubbing (filmmaking)
- List of Indian dubbing artists
- Prachi Save Sathi - Official Hindi dubbing voice for Minnie Mouse
- Javed Jaffrey - Official Hindi dubbing voice for Mickey Mouse and Goofy
