= Teech =

American sitcom

- Genre: Sitcom
- Created by: Norman Steinberg; David Frankel
- Written by: David Frankel; Richard Marcus; Norman Steinberg; Thomas Szollosi; Richard Christian Matheson
- Directed by: Art Dielhenn; Paul Lazarus
- Starring: Phill Lewis; Curnal Achilles Aulisio; Joshua Hoffman; Ken Lawrence Johnston; Jason Kristofer; Maggie Han; Steven Gilborn
- Theme music composer: David Frankel; Tom Snow; Norman Steinberg
- Opening theme: "Teach Me" performed by B. B. King
- Country of origin: United States
- Original language: English
- No. of seasons: 1
- No. of episodes: 13 (9 unaired)

Production
- Executive producers: Norman Steinberg; David Frankel
- Producer: Bruce Chevillat
- Editor: Jerry Davis
- Running time: 30 minutes
- Production companies: Nikndaph Productions; Columbia Pictures Television

Original release
- Network: CBS
- Release: September 18 – October 16, 1991

Teech is an American sitcom television series that briefly aired on CBS from September 18 to October 16, 1991 as part of its 1991 Fall lineup. The series was co-produced by Nikndaph Productions in association with Columbia Pictures Television for CBS.

== Synopsis ==
Teech stars Phill Lewis as "Teech" Gibson, an African American music instructor (and the "coolest teacher") at Winthrop Academy, a prestigious, predominantly-white prep school. He has style and drives a Corvair. Teech loves music and has tremendous appeal even to troubled, disruptive students, namely the "gang of four" who are the reigning pranksters of the school. Teech also had appeal to Cassie Lee (Maggie Han), the sexy assistant headmaster who had hired him. Headmaster Alfred Litton (Steven Gilborn) wanted to dismiss Teech's troubled students from the school. He apparently would like to have done the same to Teech except he realized that so doing would likely open him to charges of racism and discrimination.

== Cast ==
- David "Teech" Gibson (Phill Lewis) is the recently hired African American music instructor at Winthrop Academy.
- George Dubcek, Jr. (Curnal Achilles Aulisio) one of the members of the "gang of four." He's an archetypal jock who's the son of a retired NFL football player.
- Alfred W. Litton (Steven Gilborn) is the school's headmaster who loves any form of punishment. His favorite is the "stool of deprivation" where one must wear pants that have a stool attached to them for a week.
- Cassie Lee (Maggie Han) is the headmistress that is responsible for hiring Teech Gibson.
- Kenny Freedman (Josh Hoffman) one of the members of the "gang of four." The gang's leader and lady killer.
- Boyd Askew (Kevin Lawrence Johnson) one of the members of the "gang of four." He's the son of a wealthy and well connected family.
- Alby Nichols (Jason Kristofer) one of the members of the "gang of four." Known as the "Philly Cheese Steak Prince" and often strikes out with the ladies.
- Adrian Peterman (Jack Noseworthy) is the stereotypical teacher's pet, always trying to get the "gang of four" expelled.

== Production notes ==
The series was created by David Frankel and Norman Steinberg. The theme song for Teech "Teach Me" was written by Tom Snow and performed by B. B. King.

=== Runtime and Cancellation ===
The show ran from September 18th to October 16th, 1991, and aired on Wednesdays at 8:30 pm. One Episode of Teech temporarily replaced CBS's The Royal Family, running at 8:00 pm on Wednesday instead. Teech was pulled from TV after only four episodes had released.

== Reception ==
The premier of Teech increased viewer rate by 62% compared the previous year’s Doctor Doctor.

Teech was met with a largely negative reception. Critics argue that the themes of racism are poorly handled and outdated.

Marc Berman, a TV critic and journalist, argues that Teech poorly handles the racist themes in the show that are only played for laughs.

The jokes about the "service entrance" and "watermelon" seem dated to the 1960's and they wouldn't have been funny then either

Johanna Schneller, a TV critic on Showtime magazine, argues that Teech promotes sexist stereotypes through Ms. Lee, commenting on her short skirt length and how Ms. Lee talks about her sex life with other boys in the school

She wears skirts so short, they're belts, and makes jokes with the boys about her sex life. Too bad the producers of the show, who are trying so hard to dispel racial stereotypes, aren't more concerned with the sexist stereotypes that they're creating

== Episodes ==
No.	Title	Directed by	Written by	Original release date
1	"Pilot"	Art Dielhenn	Norman Steinberg & David Frankel	September 18, 1991
2	"Stool Daze"	James Widdoes	Norman Steinberg & David Frankel	September 25, 1991
3	"Carnival Knowledge"	Stan Lathan	Terri Minsky	October 2, 1991
4	"Teech vs. Dubcek"	Art Dielhenn	Stacey Hur	October 16, 1991
5	"Nervously Virgin on a Woman Breakdown"	N/A	N/A	Unaired
6	"Sink or Swim"	N/A	N/A	Unaired
7	"Understudy"	N/A	N/A	Unaired
8	"Life's Little Lessons"	Art Dielhenn	Lyla Oliver	Unaired
9	"The Candidate"	James Widdoes	Jonathan Feldman	Unaired
10	"Pizza My Heart"	N/A	N/A	Unaired
11	"Loosiers"	Paul Lazarus	Jonathan Feldman & Terri Minsky	Unaired
12	"In Charm's Way"	Paul Lazarus	Richard Christian Matheson & Thomas Szollosi	Unaired
13	"Members Only"	Thomas J. Thompson	Story by : Rick Cunningham & Richard Marcus; Teleplay by : Richard Marcus	Unaired
