= Murphy's Law (American TV series) =

Television series

- Genre: Comedy drama
- Created by: Lee David Zlotoff, based on characters from the "Trace" and "Digger" novels by Warren Murphy
- Written by: Lee David Zlotoff; Michael Gleason; Lee Goldberg; William Rabkin; Ernie Wallengren
- Starring: George Segal; Maggie Han; Josh Mostel
- Theme music composer: Steve Kipner; Paul Bliss; Al Jarreau
- Opening theme: "Murphy's Law" performed by Al Jarreau
- Composer: Jeanette Acosta
- Country of origin: United States
- Original language: English
- No. of seasons: 1
- No. of episodes: 13 (1 unaired)

Production
- Executive producers: Zev Braun; Leonard Stern; Michael Gleason
- Producers: Ernie Wallengren; Gareth Davies
- Running time: 60 minutes
- Production companies: Zev Braun Productions; Michael Gleason Productions; New World Television

Original release
- Network: ABC
- Release: November 2, 1988 – March 18, 1989

Murphy's Law is an American crime drama that starred George Segal and Maggie Han, loosely based on the Trace and Digger novels by Warren Murphy. The opening theme song, which replaced an instrumental by Mike Post, was an edited version of "Murphy's Law," a song featured on the album "High Crime" by Al Jarreau. The series premiered November 2, 1988, on ABC. On March 9, 1989, ABC announced that it had canceled the series and that the final episode would air on March 18, 1989. The actual final, unaired episode, entitled "All's Wrong That Ends Wrong," resolved a key storyline in the series (recovering alcoholic Murphy was awarded custody of his daughter from his estranged ex-wife) and also served an unsold pilot for a spin-off starring Joan Severance.

== Synopsis ==
Daedelus Patrick Murphy (Segal) was a recovering alcoholic who worked as an insurance-fraud investigator for First Fidelity Insurance. His unusual methods sometimes led him to clash with office executive Victor Beaudine, though supervisor Wesley Harden often ran interference for Murphy since his methods got results. He lived with girlfriend and fashion model Kimiko Fannuchi (Han), while attempting to reconnect with his estranged daughter. In the actual final, unaired episode, entitled "All's Wrong That Ends Wrong," Murphy was awarded custody of his daughter from his estranged ex-wife. The episode also served as an unsold pilot for a proposed spin-off starring Joan Severance as an insurance investigator.

== Cast ==
=== Main ===
- George Segal as Daedalus Patrick Murphy
- Maggie Han as Kimiko Fannuchi
- Josh Mostel as Wesley Harden
- Sarah Sawatsky as Kathleen Danforth
- Charles Rocket as Victor Beaudine
- Kim Lankford as Marissa Danforth
- Serge Houde as Ed

=== Guest stars ===
- Gerard Christopher
- Will Estes
- Norman Fell
- Clyde Kusatsu
- Patrick Macnee
- Reni Santoni
- Joan Severance
- John Standing
- Julia Sweeney

== Episodes ==
Twelve episodes are registered with the United States Copyright Office.

No.	Title	Directed by	Written by	Original release date	U.S. viewers (millions)
1	"The Room Above the Indian Grocery"	Lee David Zlotoff	Lee David Zlotoff	November 2, 1988	13.4
2	"Where are My Socks and Other Mysteries of Love"	Bill Bixby	Michael Gleason	December 3, 1988	11.4
3	"If You Can't Win, Shoot for a Tie"	Don Weis	Lee Goldberg & William Rabkin	December 10, 1988	10.4
4	"Do Someone a Favor and It Becomes Your Job"	Bill Bixby	E.F. Wallengren	December 17, 1988	9.9
5	"Never Play Leapfrog with a Unicorn"	Bruce Seth Green	Lee Goldberg & William Rabkin	January 14, 1989	8.7
6	"Never Try to Teach a Pig to Sing"	Charles Correll	Ken Goldstein	January 21, 1989	11.4
7	"Two Wrongs Are Only the Beginning"	Don Weis	Lee Goldberg & William Rabkin	January 28, 1989	10.3
8	"Never Wear Earmuffs in a Bed of Rattlesnakes"	Seymour Robbie	Michael Gleason	February 4, 1989	9.1
9	"Where There's a Will, There's a Won't"	Don Weis	Lee Goldberg & William Rabkin	February 11, 1989	8.3
10	"When You're Over the Hill, You Pick Up Speed"	Seymour Robbie	E.F. Wallengren	February 18, 1989	9.7
11	"Experience Is Something You Don't Get Until Just After You Need It"	Burt Brinckerhoff	Bill Schmidt	March 11, 1989	7.5
12	"Doing It the Hard Way Is Always Easier"	Bruce Seth Green	Lee Goldberg & William Rabkin	March 18, 1989	8.3
13	"All's Wrong That Ends Wrong"	Burt Brinckerhoff	Michael Gleason & E.F. Wallengren	Unaired	N/A
Unsold pilot for a spin-off starring Joan Severance
