= My Past Is My Own =

- Genre: Drama; Family
- Written by: Alan L. Gansberg
- Directed by: Helaine Head
- Starring: Whoopi Goldberg; Phill Lewis; Allison Dean
- Music by: George S. Clinton
- Country of origin: United States
- Original language: English

Production
- Executive producer: Bradley Wigor
- Producers: Alan L. Gansberg; Michael Killen; Joseph Maurer; Larry Rapaport
- Cinematography: Bernard Salzmann
- Editor: Jayme Wing
- Running time: 60 minutes

Original release
- Release: January 24, 1989

My Past Is My Own is a television film which aired as a CBS Schoolbreak Special on January 24, 1989. The film is centered on a sit-in in the early 1960s at a racially segregated lunch counter in the Southern United States. Whoopi Goldberg, Phill Lewis and Allison Dean portray the lead characters.

Writer/producer Alan Gansberg was awarded the 1989 Humanitas Prize in the Children's Live-Action Category for his work on My Past Is My Own. Editor Jayme Wing was nominated for an Emmy for best achievement in film editing.

== Plot ==
Justin Cook (Phill Lewis) and his sister Kerry (Allison Dean) are two African American teenagers living in a middle-class New Jersey household in the late 1980s. The Cook family is visited by their distant cousin, psychologist Mariah Johnston (Whoopi Goldberg). A contemporary of Justin and Kerry's parents, Mariah is about to receive an award for her years of community work, particularly in the area of civil rights. Having been born after the Civil Rights Movement, Justin and Kerry never experienced Jim Crow segregation, and the two fail to appreciate the stories about the era that Mariah and their parents recount at dinner.

While Justin and Kerry sleep that night, they are mysteriously transported to a small town in Georgia in 1961. While there, the siblings participate in a sit-in at a segregated lunch counter. The protest is staged by a group of local teenagers and young adults—including their cousin Mariah. The siblings are horrified by the hostility and racism of local White residents, and inspired by the strength displayed by Mariah and the others as the group is harassed during the sit-in.

When they awaken the following morning, the siblings find themselves back in the 1980s. No one is aware of their journey to the past except Justin and Kerry themselves (and possibly Mariah). As the Cook family watches Mariah accept her award later that day, Justin and Kerry do so with a greater appreciation for Mariah, the Civil Rights Movement, and the history of African Americans in general.

== Cast ==
- Whoopi Goldberg - Mariah Johnston
- Phill Lewis - Justin Cook
- Allison Dean - Kerry Cook
- C.C.H. Pounder - Renee Cook
- Thalmus Rasulala - Marshall Cook
- William Allen Young - Rev. James Jordan
- Geoffrey Blake - Dexter Lee Smith
- Guy Boyd - Russell Crew
- Gloria Carlin - Frances Taylor
- Kenneth Edwards - Clyde Waller
- Dominic Hoffman - Donny Hall
- Charles Stransky - Alfred Wainwright
- Anthony Grumbach - White Boy
- Laurneá Wilkerson - Brianne Solomons
- Dorothy Sinclair - White Woman
- James Marshall - Willie Willens

== Music ==
- The James Ingram tune "Remember the Dream" serves as the theme song for the movie.

== See also ==
- Civil rights movement in popular culture
