= Maggie Han =

American retired actress (born 1959)

- Born: 1959 (age 66–67); Providence, Rhode Island, U.S.
- Occupations: Actress; model
- Years active: 1985–1996

Maggie Han (born 1959) is an American retired actress. Her career began with modeling jobs in the United States and France and progressed to acting in film and television productions. She is best known for playing Yoshiko Kawashima in The Last Emperor and Cheryl the lawyer in the NBC sitcom Seinfeld.

== Biography ==
Maggie Han was born in Providence, Rhode Island. Her parents were retired music professors who immigrated to the United States from South Korea. She grew up enthralled by feminist literature and stated that she developed an "aversion to the idea of marriage and a family." At the age of 16, Han enrolled at Harvard University and majored in American history. Upon the suggestion of a stranger, she contacted a local modeling agency and began working part-time. After receiving an increasing number of job offers, Han decided to model full-time in Paris.

She modeled for six years in Paris and later New York and has described one of her more memorable experiences as being a photo-shoot in a war-torn area of Lebanon. In 1983, Han returned to Harvard to continue working on her degree. While there, she became an award-winning reporter for the Harvard Crimson newspaper. During this time she got a deal to do part-time modeling for the pantyhose company L'eggs and appeared in several commercials for them. In 1985, Han received an offer to audition for the miniseries Space. To make her acting debut in that series, she again dropped out of Harvard but stated that returning for a second time was a possibility. Afterward, she moved to Los Angeles to pursue further acting roles, including Sandy in several episodes of LA Law and Eastern Jewel in The Last Emperor, her film debut.

== Filmography ==
Year	Title	Role	Notes
1985	Space	Cindy Rhee	3 episodes
1986	Head of the Class	Shayeeda	1 episode
1986	LA Law	Sandy	3 episodes
1987	The Last Emperor	Yoshiko Kawashima	
1987	Crime Story	Ginnie Chan	1 episode
1988	Mr. Belvedere	Tami Suzuki	2 episodes
1988–1989	Murphy's Law	Kimiko Fannuchi	5 episodes
1990	Murder in Paradise	Dr. Diane Mahona	
1990	Crazy People	Connie Vega-Margolis	
1990	Dark Avenger	Rae Wong	
1991	Teech	Cassie Lee	Regular
1993	Seinfeld	Cheryl Fong	2 episodes
1993	Black Tie Affair	Cookie	Regular
1994	Diagnosis Murder	Sunshine	1 episode
1994	Junior	Lab Assistant	
1995	Open Season	Cary Sain	
1996	Murder, She Wrote	Nobu Hitaki	1 episode
