= The Suite Life of Zack & Cody season 1 =

The Suite Life of Zack & Cody
- Season 1
- No. of episodes: 26

Release
- Original network: Disney Channel
- Original release: March 18, 2005 – January 27, 2006

Season chronology
- Next → Season 2

The first season of The Suite Life of Zack & Cody aired on Disney Channel from March 18, 2005 to January 27, 2006. The season introduces Zack and Cody Martin, twin brothers who move into the Tipton Hotel in Boston with their mother, Carey, where she sings and performs in the lounge. The show also centers on London Tipton, the daughter of the hotel owner, who is very wealthy and ditzy, the hotel's down-to-earth candy-counter girl, Maddie Fitzpatrick, and Mr. Moseby, the strict, dutiful, and serious manager, who is often the foil to Zack and Cody's schemes and has a liking to the piano, pocket hankies and ballet.

In the show's first season there are several recurring characters introduced: Adrian R'Mante as Esteban, Brian Stepanek as Arwin, Charlie Stewart as Bob, Estelle Harris as Muriel, Aaron Musicant as Lance, Sophie Oda as Barbara, Patrick Bristow as Patrick, Monique Coleman as Mary Margaret, Alyson Stoner as Max, Robert Torti as Kurt, Anthony Acker as Norman, Sharon Jordan as Irene, Allie Grant as Agnes, Dennis Bendersky as Tapeworm, Caroline Rhea as Ilsa, Gus Hoffman as Warren and Ernie Grunwald as Mr. Forgess.

Special guest stars and notable appearances in this season include: Victoria Justice as Rebecca, Julia Duffy as Martha Harrington, Emma Stone (Note: Credited as Emily Stone) as Ivana Tipton (voice) and Jesse McCartney as himself.

In this season Dylan Sprouse, Cole Sprouse, Brenda Song, Ashley Tisdale, Phill Lewis and Kim Rhodes appeared in all episodes making it the only season of the show in which all of them appeared in all episodes.

== Production ==
The show was originally ordered to series for a 21-episode first season. However, after the show premiered with good ratings establishing itself as Disney's top series in key boy demographics, and only behind That’s So Raven in kids 2-11 and 6-11, the network decided to order five additional episodes to a total of 26 episodes for the first season.

== Premise ==
Set in Boston, the show focuses on the twins Zack (Dylan Sprouse) and Cody (Cole Sprouse) who move to the luxurious Tipton Hotel, when their mother Carey (Kim Rhodes) gets a job as a singer in the lounge. The hotel is managed by Mr. Moseby (Phill Lewis), who has also taken care of the heiress of the Tipton empire her whole life, London Tipton (Brenda Song). The show also introduces Maddie (Ashley Tisdale), the teenage candy-counter girl at the Tipton Hotel, who despite being the complete opposite of London, ends up becoming her best friend.

== Theme song and opening sequence ==
The show's theme song, "Here I Am," was written by John Adair and Steve Hampton (who also wrote the theme for the show's spinoff The Suite Life on Deck, as well as for fellow Disney Channel series Phil of the Future, Wizards of Waverly Place, Good Luck Charlie, Shake It Up, Sonny with a Chance, Jonas, So Random!, A.N.T. Farm, PrankStars, and Austin & Ally and the ABC Kids series Power Rangers RPM), with music composed by Gary Scott (who also composed the music cues to signal scene changes and promo breaks, which are styled similarly to the theme), and is performed by Loren Ellis and the Drew Davis Band (who also performed the theme to Phil of the Future, and whose performance is uncredited). The theme was remixed for the ending credits of "Rock Star in the House" in a form similar to "Beautiful Soul" to accompany the episode's guest appearance from Jesse McCartney.

== Cast ==
=== Main cast ===
- Dylan Sprouse as Zack Martin
- Cole Sprouse as Cody Martin
- Brenda Song as London Tipton
- Ashley Tisdale as Maddie Fitzpatrick
- Phill Lewis as Mr. Moseby
- Kim Rhodes as Carey Martin

=== Special guest cast ===
- Julia Duffy as Martha Harrington
- Jesse McCartney as himself

=== Notable appearances ===
- Victoria Justice as Rebecca
- Emma Stone as Ivana Tipton (voice)

=== Co-stars ===
- Sharon Jordan as Irene
- Anthony Acker as Norman

=== Recurring cast ===
- Adrian R'Mante as Esteban Ramirez
- Estelle Harris as Muriel
- Brian Stepanek as Arwin Hawkhauser
- Patrick Bristow as Patrick
- Alyson Stoner as Max
- Dennis Bendersky as Tapeworm
- Aaron Musicant as Lance Fishman
- Robert Torti as Kurt Martin
- Caroline Rhea as Ilsa Shickelgrubermeiger
- Charlie Stewart as Bob
- Sophie Oda as Barbara Brownstein
- Monique Coleman as Mary Margaret
- Allie Grant as Agnes
- Gus Hoffman as Warren
- Ernie Grunwald as Mr. Forgess

== Episodes ==
No. overall	No. in season	Title	Directed by	Written by	Original release date	Prod. code	Viewers (millions)
1	1	"Hotel Hangout"	Rich Correll	Jeny Quine	March 18, 2005	102	3.5
Identical twin brothers, Zack (Dylan Sprouse) and Cody Martin (Cole Sprouse), are new at their school and are struggling to make friends. The twins make friends with Max and Tapeworm, who are both unpopular. Zack and Cody soon meet Drew, a popular student at the school, who befriends the twins after learning that they live in the Tipton Hotel. After their new found popularity, they begin to ignore their real friends. Meanwhile, Mr. Marion Moseby (Phill Lewis), the hotel's uptight manager, hires Maddie Fitzpatrick (Ashley Tisdale), the candy-counter girl, to be London Tipton's (Brenda Song) tutor. Guest stars: Adrian R'Mante as Esteban, Alyson Stoner as Max, Dennis Bendersky as Tapeworm, Jascha Washington as Drew, Aaron Musicant as Lance
2	2	"The Fairest of Them All"	Rich Correll	Valerie Ahern & Christian McLaughlin	March 18, 2005	104	3.71
A beauty pageant is held at the Tipton Hotel and Zack and Cody find interest in the contestants. Cody meets one of the contestants, Rebecca, and has a liking to her. Cody then enters the competition, hoping to get close to Rebecca. He then disguises as a girl named Tyreesha, who previously quit the competition. However, Cody then drops out of the competition because he wants Rebecca to win the pageant. So, Zack stuffs him in a closet backstage and takes his place. Cody is soon set free, then runs on stage to fight Zack, disqualifying them. Rebecca wins the competition. Guest stars: Stephanie Hodge as Brianna's mother, Victoria Justice as Rebecca, Lisa Long as Bev, Skyler Samuels as Brianna, Matt Winston as Tim
3	3	"Maddie Checks In"	Rich Correll	Danny Kallis & Jim Geoghan	March 25, 2005	103	N/A
A hotel guest named Jason checks into the Tipton Hotel and Maddie seems to like him very much. When London invites her and Jason to see a concert, she asks Maddie to play along for one night and act rich. This backfires when Jason and his parents stay another night in Boston, and when Zack and Cody get involved. They get her into the imperial suite, but another guest, the Amputator, checks into Maddie's suite, so the boys must dismantle the suite in order for the wrestler to check out of the hotel. Special guest star: Julia Duffy as Martha Harrington Guest stars: Adrian R'Mante as Esteban Ramirez, Daniel Booko as Kyle, Lee Reherman as the Amputator, James Snyder as Jason Harrington, Lyman Ward as George Harrington
4	4	"Hotel Inspector"	Henry Chan	Marc Flanagan	April 1, 2005	107	N/A
Mr. Moseby, worried that their antics will get him in trouble with the hotel inspector, bribes Zack and Cody with tickets to a baseball game and money for dinner so they will not be at the hotel during the visit. However, they return just as the meeting with the inspector, Ilsa (Caroline Rhea), is going on. The two rats that they were using for a science project, then run loose in the hotel (Zack had brought them to the game without Cody's knowledge), getting Mr. Moseby fired and replaced by Ilsa. Zack and Cody try to devise a plan that will help get Mr. Moseby his job back at the Tipton. Guest stars: Caroline Rhea as Ilsa, Estelle Harris as Muriel, Adrian R'Mante as Esteban
5	5	"Grounded on the 23rd Floor"	Lee Shallat-Chemel	Danny Kallis & Jim Geoghan	April 8, 2005	101	2.78
Zack and Cody get grounded for a week for rollerblading in the lobby, injuring Mr. Moseby in the process. When they find out a famous couple is getting married at the hotel, they buy a camera off Maddie to take a picture of the kiss rumored to be selling for 20,000 dollars. Zack sneaks into the wedding and takes the picture, only for Maddie, Cody, and Zack to be busted by Mr. Moseby. The boys are still grounded after Carey finds out. Note: This was originally the first episode of the entire series, as the episode style and layout was that of a pilot episode and many of the props used in the episode (such as Maddie's uniform or some furniture in the Martins' suite) were not used in future episodes. Additionally, Maddie has brown hair instead of blonde hair in this episode. An alternate version of this episode also aired with different cuts and extended scenes, including an extended scene after Maddie and London talk and London says "Hold that elevator!" and more conversations between Zack and Cody when they are observing armpit hairs and when Carey refers to the previous hotel accident. Guest stars: Vince Rimoldi as Tuck, Bob Mackey as Master Z, Louis Dauber as The Reverend, Joyce Giraud as Ursula, Maximillian Alexander as Bobby Carillo, Terry Simpson as Cute Guy, Carey Scott as Photographer
6	6	"The Prince & The Plunger"	Andrew Tsao	Adam Lapidus	April 15, 2005	106	N/A
Arwin, the hotel engineer, sends Carey flowers and a poem. However, she thinks they were sent by Serge the concierge, who when asked, lied to Carey about the flowers and poem. When Zack and Cody find out, they help Arwin tell Carey that it was him who sent the gifts. Meanwhile, London's father the owner of the Tipton is attending her father-daughter dance, but he fails to show due to usual circumstances. Guest stars: Estelle Harris as Muriel, Brian Stepanek as Arwin Hawkhauser, Brian McNamara as Serge
7	7	"Footloser"	Rich Correll	Bill Freiberger	April 22, 2005	105	N/A
Zack and Max enter GoDanceUSA, a dance contest. When Zack hurts his ankle jumping on the bed after Max specifically told him not to do anything stupid, Cody fills in for Zack despite being a terrible dancer. London loans Maddie money for her parents trip to Paris so in return Maddie works for London Until she can repay her. In the end the entire staff chip in some money so Maddie can pay London back. Guest star: Adrian R'Mante as Esteban, Alyson Stoner as Max
8	8	"A Prom Story"	Jim Drake	Jeny Quine	May 6, 2005	111	N/A
Maddie's high school prom is coming up, and Zack finds out she is throwing it at the Tipton. When he overhears her saying that she likes a guy who has an age difference from her by three years, he thought it was him, not Jeff, the guy she liked. Meanwhile, a circus comes to the Tipton, prompting Cody to act like a mime. When Zack gets his heart broken by Maddie, she gets her heart broken by Jeff, who has a college girlfriend. Maddie then agrees to dance with Zack. Guest star: Mitchel Evans as Mime, Adam Grimes as Jeff, Monique Coleman as Mary Margaret
9	9	"Band in Boston"	Rich Correll	Billy Riback	May 20, 2005	112	N/A
Zack, Cody, Max and Tapeworm organize a band called Rock Squared for battle of the bands, but due to fighting, Cody quits the band. On the day of the event, Max locks the twins in their closet, but they find their own way there, with help from Arwin. Meanwhile, Maddie and Lance's band Waterworks for battle of the bands instruments' are funded by London after they promise she can be a back-up singer, but she is a terrible singer. Guest stars: Estelle Harris as Muriel, Brian Stepanek as Arwin, Alyson Stoner as Max, Dennis Bendersky as Tapeworm, Aaron Musicant as Lance
10	10	"Cody Goes to Camp"	Rich Correll	Jim Geoghan	June 3, 2005	113	N/A
Cody and Tapeworm go to math camp for a week, leaving Zack on his own for a few days. Meanwhile, London gets her learner's permit and while Mr. Moseby teaches her how to drive, her car ends up in the Tipton hotel wall. When Zack starts to miss Cody, he persuades London, Maddie, and Muriel to drive up to camp to check on Cody with him. Guest stars: Adrian R'Mante as Esteban Ramirez, Estelle Harris as Muriel, Dennis Bendersky as Tapeworm, Gus Hoffman as Warren, Maurice Smith as Patrolman
11	11	"To Catch a Thief"	Jeff McCracken	Ross Brown	June 18, 2005	108	N/A
Esteban is accused of a jewelry theft after someone's jewelry was stolen. Zack and Cody try to prove it wasn't him, but they end up crashing a Bar Mitzvah, for which they get punished. Meanwhile, London can't bring her dog onto her father's ship, so Maddie takes care of Ivana while she is gone. When Zack and Cody overhear the real thieves talking about heading up to London's suite, the twins, Esteban, and Maddie all set a trap to catch the real thieves. Note: This is the first time we see the SS Tipton when London is on the phone with Maddie. The life preserver says "S.S. Tipton". Guest stars: Estelle Harris as Muriel, Adrian R'Mante as Esteban Ramirez, Elimu Nelson as Eddie, J.D. Walsh as Nick
12	12	"It's a Mad, Mad, Mad Hotel"	Lex Passaris	Howard Nemetz	July 17, 2005	114	N/A
When Zack and Cody's football breaks a painting hung up in the hallway, they find an article hidden in the frame about a mobster's arrest in 1938, saying that he would be coming back to the hotel for his treasure. Desperate, Zack, Cody, Maddie, London, and Esteban all imagine what their life would be like if they found the treasure, despite London already being rich. They all search frantically for the treasure, but they end up breaking into the bank of Boston. In the end, the real treasure was Muriel, who had a fling with the mobster. Guest stars: Estelle Harris as Muriel, Adrian R'Mante as Esteban, Brian Stepanek as Arwin, Ashley Tisdale as Young Muriel Note: When Esteban is having his fantasy, the symbols on the workers shirt still have a "T" for Tipton.
13	13	"Poor Little Rich Girl"	Dana deVally Piazza	Lloyd Garver	July 22, 2005	110	N/A
Zack and Cody watch a video of them being born, but in the video, their mother might have mistaken them for each other, so they become the complete opposite of themselves. Meanwhile, London becomes poor after finding out her father went bankrupt from a failed investment of diamonds, so she stays with Maddie until her father can find a place for her to stay. At the end of the episode, Carey gets her sons' birth certificates from the hospital and tells which of her sons are which. Also London becomes rich again when Mr. Moseby tells her that her father struck oil in his diamond mine. Guest stars: Estelle Harris as Muriel, Adrian R'Mante as Esteban
14	14	"Cookin' with Romeo and Juliet"	Jim Drake	Jeny Quine & Adam Lapidus	July 22, 2005	115	N/A
Ilsa, the hotel inspector who attempted to replace Mr. Moseby as manager of the Tipton, returns and informs Mr. Moseby that she is the manager of the hotel across the street. The son of the rival hotel owner likes London but the owners of the hotel hate each other. Maddie helps them meet behind everyone's back. Zack tries to make money from Cody's cookies which are the best some people have ever tasted. Guest stars: Caroline Rhea as Ilsa, Estelle Harris as Muriel, Ben Ziff as Todd
15	15	"Rumors"	Rich Correll	Bernadette Luckett	August 14, 2005	116	N/A
London starts a rumor about Maddie and Lance that angers Maddie, eventually leading her into accidentally beginning a rumor about London that she has real fox fur in her closet. It turns out that she pronounced faux as fox, which caused Maddie to think she had real animal furs. Cody tries to make himself look less like Zack by dyeing his hair, but it turns red and he asks Zack to take his place in an interview. Guest stars: Estelle Harris as Muriel, Aaron Musicant as Lance, Adrian R'Mante as Esteban
16	16	"Big Hair & Baseball"	Rich Correll	Pamela Eells O'Connell	August 28, 2005	117	N/A
Mr. Moseby takes Zack and Cody to a baseball game, but when he accidentally catches a baseball that makes the Boston Red Sox lose the game, everyone in Boston hates him. Maddie attempts to stop her hair from frizzing before going to a blind date London set up for her with a boy who sweats when he is nervous. Guest stars: Patrick Bristow as Patrick, Chad Broskey as Gavin, Geoff Brown as Guest #2, Gerald Downey as Reporter, Estelle Harris as Muriel, Michael Kagan as Fan
17	17	"Rock Star in the House"	Kelly Sandefur	Jeny Quine & Howard Nemetz	September 18, 2005	122	3.3
Jesse McCartney stays at the Tipton. London and Maddie try to see him while Zack obtains souvenirs to auction off to other fans. Cody works on his project for a local science competition, a high frequency laser, and Arwin helps him, even though an adult's help is against the rules. Special guest star: Jesse McCartney as himself Guest stars: Harrison Knight as Sheldon, Dory Lobel as Guitarist, Sophie Oda as Barbara Brownstein, Lou Saliba as Judge, Brian Stepanek as Arwin Hawkhauser
18	18	"Smart & Smarterer"	Rich Correll	Danny Kallis & Adam Lapidus	October 10, 2005	125	N/A
Cody gets good grades and Zack gets bad grades in school and Carey reminds Zack that he will have to go to summer school if he can't keep his grades up. However, after he finds out that Bob gets more time to complete tests because he has dyslexia, Zack pretends that he has dyslexia too. Mr. Moseby loses his voice, causing havoc in the hotel. London and Maddie play chess but London keeps winning so they keep playing until Maddie wins. When she can't, London eventually lets Maddie win. Esteban helps Moseby get his voice back by giving him a special treatment and Zack gets caught lying to his teacher and Carey about dyslexia in class the next day and is forced to do extra homework over the summer. Note: This episode was later omitted from syndication, as executives feared insensitivity towards mocking children with dyslexia. Additionally, this episode is not included on Disney+, however it is available for purchase on digital release. Guest stars: Ernie Grunwald as Mr. Forgess, Adrian R'Mante as Esteban Ramirez, Charlie Stewart as Bob
19	19	"The Ghost of Suite 613"	Rich Correll	Pamela Eells O'Connell	October 14, 2005	109	N/A
Zack plays practical jokes on everyone, embarrassing them around other people. He, Cody and Maddie later hear that London encountered a ghost in Suite 613, they go to try and see it. Muriel tells them the ghost was a wealthy woman named Irene who accidentally killed herself while at the hotel on her honeymoon. After Mr. Moseby tells them of an encounter he had with the ghost, Zack later dares Cody to spend a night at the suite. They (Cody, Zack, London, Maddie and Esteban) try to talk to the spirit, getting Esteban possessed and making him, Cody, Maddie, and London disappear. It is then revealed to be a practical joke for Zack. Guest stars: Estelle Harris as Muriel, Adrian R'Mante as Esteban, Brian Stepanek as Arwin
20	20	"Dad's Back"	Rich Correll	Danny Kallis & Jim Geoghan	November 26, 2005	119	N/A
The boys' father Kurt (played by Robert Torti) returns. Zack gets tired of living by his mother's boring rules, so Zack sneaks onto his father's bus the day he leaves. Carey decides to become the "fun" parent while Kurt becomes the responsible one. London trains Maddie because of her lack of strength for gym class. Guest star: Robert Torti as Kurt
21	21	"Christmas at the Tipton"	Rich Correll	Jim Geoghan	December 10, 2005 (Note: This episode was first released in Disney Channel Holiday VHS/DVD on November 1, 2005.)	123	N/A
Everyone's plans for Christmas are cancelled when a snowstorm traps everyone in the Tipton. Carey and the boys are stuck with Kurt. After Cody sees Carey and Kurt hugging, he thinks they are getting back together. Maddie tries to get an expensive present from London by secretly writing her name on all the Secret Santa slips in the basket. In the end though, Maddie is disappointed when London gives her a sweater that she sewed herself, with no hole for the head because there is a third arm instead. Mr. Moseby enlists Arwin's help to keep everyone in the hotel warm by firing up a furnace with ripped-up furniture. While this is happening, a couple named Joseph and Mary (who is pregnant) come to stay at the Tipton on Christmas Eve, and she goes into labor, but can't make it to the hospital because the roads are closed. Finally, Mary gives birth to a beautiful baby girl in the elevator. Guest star: Tom Ecobelli as Joe, Adrian R'Mante as Esteban, Brian Stepanek as Arwin, Robert Torti as Kurt Martin, Minerva Trutillo as Maria
22	22	"Kisses & Basketball"	Danny Kallis	Danny Kallis & Jim Geoghan	January 1, 2006	120	4.2
Max kisses Zack after they win a basketball game, then Zack insults Max making her feel bad since she really likes him. The basketball team then makes him go on a date with her so that she'll feel better, but then the date goes horribly wrong, with Zack revealing it wasn't his own decision to come, and Max feels worse than ever. Maddie helps London with her shopping problems. Guest stars: Dennis Bendersky as Tapeworm, Patrick Bristow as Patrick, Brian Stepanek as Arwin Hawkhauser, Alyson Stoner as Max
23	23	"Pilot Your Own Life"	Lex Passaris	Danny Kallis & Jim Geoghan	January 6, 2006	118	N/A
Maddie and London compete with each other to get on the cover of a teen magazine. After seeing a motivational speaker do the same, Cody convinces Carey, Esteban, and others to "pilot their own lives", which causes a lot of chaos. Esteban decides to take an English class, but finds that his teacher Jeb is from Texas. He angrily tells this to Cody in a Southern accent. Carey gives a demo CD to a record executive, who tells her she has a future as a cabaret singer, asking her to check out the Tipton. Guest stars: Estelle Harris as Muriel, Jody Howard as Claire, Bru Muller as Troy Robbins, Adrian R'Mante as Esteban Ramirez
24	24	"Crushed"	Rich Correll	Pamela Eells O'Connell & Adam Lapidus	January 13, 2006	121	N/A
A classmate named Agnes (Allie Grant) falls in love with Cody because he is the only pupil who isn't mean to her. She asks him out on a date, and Cody gets Zack to go on the date and revolt her. Agnes finds out it is really Zack, not Cody, on the date, and begins to like him, instead. London sets up her dog Ivana Tipton (voiced by Emma Stone) on a date with another rich dog. Ivana doesn't like the other dog, and falls in love with Maddie's dog, Scamp. Guest stars: Patrick Bristow as Patrick, Allie Grant as Agnes, Adrian R'Mante as Esteban
25	25	"Commercial Breaks"	Rich Correll	Danny Kallis	January 20, 2006	126	4.78
A commercial for the Tipton is being shot at the hotel. All of the employees have to audition. The director doesn't like anybody who auditioned, but picks London because her father signs his paycheck. London is horrible, so she is fired and replaced by Mr. Moseby who subsequently trips and breaks his leg, so Carey (who had previously dated the director) does the commercial. Guest stars: Patrick Bristow as Patrick, Christina Grace as Demina, Steve Hytner as Herman, Adrian R'Mante as Esteban, Brian Stepanek as Arwin
26	26	"Boston Holiday"	Lex Passaris	Pamela Eells O'Connell	January 27, 2006	124	3.85
Prince Sanjay, The Prince of Ishkabar, stays at the Tipton and becomes friends with Zack and Cody. He tells them he just wants to be a normal child and Zack takes him to the mall while Cody takes his place in a meeting with the mayor (Cody wears a Shabakababa which is a worn on occasions in Sanjay's culture – it covers the face so nobody could tell it was Cody). While trying to impress girls, Sanjay accidentally steals clothes while thinking that it was ok and that his people will pay for it. Zack and Sanjay end up in mall jail. Meanwhile, London thinks she has spotted a UFO and Maddie helps her because London keeps ordering delicious and expensive food. In the end, it turns out to be a mylar balloon from London's birthday party caught on a TV antenna. Guest stars: Parvesh Cheena as Mr. Babalabaloo, Neil Joshi as Prince Sanjei, Mark Povinelli as Bleep, Angela V. Shelton as Delilah, Danny Woodburn as Blop, Art Kimbro as Mayor
