= Zack and Cody Martin =

Fictional characters in The Suite Life franchise

Zack & Cody Martin
- The Suite Life of Zack & Cody and The Suite Life on Deck characters
- Zack (left) and Cody (right) in The Suite Life on Deck
- First appearance: "Hotel Hangout"; The Suite Life of Zack & Cody; March 18, 2005
- Last appearance: "Cole & Dylan Sprouse"; So Random!; January 16, 2012
- Created by: Danny Kallis and Jim Geoghan
- Portrayed by: Dylan Sprouse (Zack); Cole Sprouse (Cody)

In-universe information
- Gender: Male
- Family: Kurt Martin (father); Carey Martin (mother)
- Significant others: Maya Bennett (Zack); Bailey Pickett (Cody)
- Origin: Seattle, Washington
- Nationality: American

Zack and Cody Martin are fictional characters and the central protagonists of the American television teen sitcom series The Suite Life of Zack & Cody, its sequel/spin-off series The Suite Life on Deck, and the television film The Suite Life Movie, portrayed by Dylan Sprouse and Cole Sprouse, respectively.

Created by Danny Kallis and Jim Geoghan, Zack and Cody Martin are identical twin brothers who reside at the fictional Tipton Hotel's flagship location in Boston in the original series. Years later in the subsequent series, Zack and Cody live aboard the company's eponymous cruise ship, studying abroad in the ship's international semester-at-sea high school. Despite being twin brothers, the Martin siblings have distinct personalities and tendencies; Zack is usually depicted as fun-loving, rebellious, and immature, while Cody is depicted as intelligent, kind-hearted, and sensitive. Throughout the course of both series, the Martin brothers experience the hallmarks of adolescence, such as friendships, academics, bullying, peer pressure, sibling rivalry, parental communication, relationships, and maturity.

The Martin brothers have also appeared in multiple crossover episodes of other Disney Channel series, including That's So Raven, Wizards of Waverly Place, Hannah Montana, I'm in the Band, So Random!, and the special Studio DC: Almost Live.

== Concept and creation ==
Dylan Sprouse stated that the idea of twins living in a hotel was something he and his brother came up with when they were shooting Big Daddy and stayed in a hotel for four months. Sprouse said of Zack and Cody, "The characters were originally based off of our personalities. In fact, they were originally named Dylan and Cole."

== Character information ==
The Martin brothers were born at St. Joseph's Hospital in Seattle, Washington on a Saturday: Zack at 6:30 and Cody at 6:40. The year of their births is not clear. In The Suite Life on Deck episode, "Das Boots", it is said to be 1993. In the episode of The Suite Life of Zack & Cody titled "Poor Little Rich Girl", however, a baby video of the two is date-stamped September 23, 1992.

The twins attended Buckner Middle School during seasons 1 & 2, Cheevers High School during season 3 of The Suite Life of Zack & Cody, and Seven Seas High on board the SS Tipton in The Suite Life on Deck. In one episode of The Suite Life on Deck, Cody and Zack fight over the fact that Zack stole an old term paper from Cody rather than writing his own, and Zack admits that he knows he'll never match Cody academically and feels inferior to his brother; in response, Cody admits that he works hard to get grades because Zack is better at sports, better with girls, and more popular, while the only thing Cody has going for him is his intelligence. Cody is shown to have a strong—almost obsessive—fear of germs. The twins are proven to have Swedish backgrounds in the Suite Life on Deck episode, "The Swede Life".

=== Cody ===
Cody is more erudite and intelligent than Zack. He also tends to be more caring, sensitive, polite, and more well-behaved than his brother, but even he is not perfect; he occasionally shows acts of meanness and greed. He generally receives good grades in school, and according to Zack, Cody has a 5.0 grade point average. He is often referred to as a nerd, though he prefers the phrase "educationally gifted". London Tipton, daughter of the man who owns the Tipton Hotel in which the twins reside for the duration of The Suite Life of Zack & Cody, uses him on various occasions to complete her schoolwork.

Despite his exceptional intelligence and relative maturity when compared to Zack, Cody exhibits some comically regressive behaviors, such as calling his mother "Mommy", screaming when frightened, and carrying a "blankey" into his teens. This becomes a running joke throughout the series. In "Big Hair & Baseball", it is revealed that he has astigmatism. He originally intended to attend Harvard University; however, after a bad encounter with a dean there, as Cody helped to lie when Zack dated the dean's daughter, Cody decides to attend Yale. Cody says that his biggest dream is to win a Nobel Prize. Although Cody shows the same interest in girls as Zack, he prefers long-term relationships with one girl instead of many girls at once like Zack. His long-term relationship with Bailey is a major plot in the second series.

=== Zack ===
Zack is more laid-back, self-centered, and outgoing than Cody. Zack tends to be less mature than his brother, but he does occasionally show signs of compassion and caring. He generally receives bad grades in school. Zack is intelligent, as is shown when he was sent to summer school and was the smartest kid in class to the point he taught the other kids the lesson himself. This shows that Zack can perform well in school when he studies properly. He also is talented in woodwork until the teacher entrusted the class into his care and recommended him for advanced placement woodshop. Zack is very mischievous and enjoys pranking people.

Zack enjoys dating every girl he meets and is somewhat promiscuous compared to his brother. Until he meets Maya and forms his first serious relationship with her. She later joins the Peace Corps and, not believing in long-distance relationships, breaks up with him, leaving him devastated.

== Appearances ==
=== The Suite Life of Zack & Cody ===
After traveling around the nation, the twins and their mother Carey arrive in Boston, residing in the Tipton Hotel. Cody and Zack become friends with Maddie Fitzpatrick, they each keep a picture of her in their rooms when they move to the SS Tipton. During the On Deck episode "Maddie On Deck", Maddie flirts with Zack a bit while visiting and even kisses him to give him confidence. Cody does well in school and is interested in several intellectual activities, which results in him attending math camp and winning a spelling bee.

Like Zack, Cody inherits musical talents from his parents. He can sing and dance, as seen in "Lip-Syncing in the Rain" and "Sleepover Suite", and can act. In addition to singing, Cody plays the French horn and the violin. Cody is closer than Zack to their mother and often heeds her advice.

In the first season, Cody is as much of a troublemaker as Zack. As the show progresses, his character develops into a type who generally only gets in trouble by mistake or (more often) due to Zack's influence. Cody is often the victim of various sight gags (which range from humorous to traumatic). Examples include being pushed in horse feces; getting trampled; and being frozen in ice.

During the third season, Cody works part-time as a bag boy at the Paul Revere minimart over the summer holidays. It becomes a setting and theme for some episodes, most notably "Summer of Our Discontent", "Who's the Boss?", and "Baggage". Cody acted as producer of London Tipton's "Yay Me! Starring London Tipton" webcast, although he quits or rejoins the show based on his relationship with London.

=== The Suite Life on Deck ===
Following the events of The Suite Life of Zack & Cody, Zack and Cody enroll in Seven Seas High School aboard the SS Tipton cruise ship, where they live each school semester. Cody shares a room with Woody Fink, a messy, overweight student. While at school on board the SS Tipton, Cody becomes the ship's towel boy to earn money after Zack maxes out both of their student cash cards on non-essential items, particularly food and gifts for girls Zack is interested in. Zack initially shares a room with Bailey Pickett, a smart and intelligent student, who's a girl disguised as a boy. Zack initially develops a crush on Bailey after finding out that she is a girl. He starts fighting with Cody over her, but after Mr. Moseby tells them that Bailey is still not over her ex-boyfriend Moose, Zack tells Cody that he can have her. For the first season Cody works to win over Bailey until she eventually becomes his girlfriend. They date throughout the second season but breakup at the end due to a misunderstanding. In the third season they are still good friends but are shown to still have feelings for each other until they finally get back together and agree to a long-distance relationship in "Graduation on Deck" while they are both in college. In the third season, Zack starts developing feelings for a girl named Maya Bennett. Initially, she rejects him because he is a "player". They finally get together in "Party On!" In "Graduation on Deck", the series finale, Maya joined the Peace Corps in Africa, and as a result, breaks up with Zack, because she could not handle a long-distance relationship.

=== The Suite Life Movie ===
Set during the third season of The Suite Life on Deck, Cody and his girlfriend, Bailey, originally plan to spend senior year spring break together, but Cody decides instead to intern for Dr. Spaulding for the opportunity to earn a Yale scholarship. He writes a long letter to Bailey explaining his decision, but he starts to quarrel with Zack and loses the letter, which leads to Bailey becoming upset with him. Cody goes to the marine biology lab where he will intern, but Zack gets him into a quarrel and they damage the lab's property, costing Cody his spot. Zack attempts to make it up to him, and helps Cody to get an internship with Dr. Olsen in the Gemini Project.
