= London Tipton =

Fictional character

- London in "Bon Voyage" (The Suite Life on Deck)
- First appearance: "Hotel Hangout" (The Suite Life of Zack & Cody, 2005)
- Last appearance: "Graduation on Deck" (The Suite Life on Deck; 2011)
- Created by: Danny Kallis; Jim Geoghan
- Portrayed by: Brenda Song; Haley Tju (young)

In-universe information
- Nicknames: Princess (by Mr. Tipton); Lon (by Sister Dominick, when London called her Sis); Airhead Heiress (by Maddie)
- Occupation: 12th grade student (Seven Seas High); Former student (Our Lady of Perpetual Sorrow, expelled); Owner/Manager (The Cluck Bucket); Heiress (Tipton Industries); Owner/head of Simply London Cosmetics; Owner of London's Swimsuit Line; Former owner of London's Boutique at the Tipton; Owner of One of a Kind Clothes
- Family: Wilfred Tipton (father); Li Tipton (mother unseen); Louise Tipton (former stepmother; unseen); Brandi Tipton (former stepmother); Yolanda (former stepsister); Karina Tipton (former stepmother); 15 additional stepmothers Khun Yai (maternal grandmother)
- Pets: Dogs: Ivana; Prince Percival Persimmon DuLoc (Ivana and Scamp's puppy); Cat: "Cat" (revealed in Club Twin)
- Nationality: American (English for tax purposes)

London Leah Tipton is a fictional character in Disney Channel's Suite Life franchise, which consists of The Suite Life of Zack & Cody, its spinoff, The Suite Life on Deck, and the made-for-TV Suite Life Movie. London has also appeared on cross-over episodes of other Disney series, such as Wizards of Waverly Place, That's So Raven and Hannah Montana and the special, Studio DC: Almost Live.

The character is portrayed by Brenda Song, who was offered the starring female role without an audition. While the character is a parody of socialite Paris Hilton, Song describes the character as being complex, and has stated London Tipton is her fantasy character. She is the daughter of Wilfred Tipton, the owner of the Tipton Hotel chain and the SS Tipton. Along with Dylan and Cole Sprouse, she has appeared in every episode of The Suite Life of Zack & Cody except for "Have a Nice Trip" and "Birdman of Boston", and every episode of The Suite Life on Deck.

== Background ==
London Tipton is the only child of wealthy businessman Wilfred Tipton. Her mother, who has never been named or seen, is of Thai origin; her father is American, though he claims British citizenship for income tax purposes. She is heiress to the Tipton corporate empire (which includes the Tipton hotel chain and many other companies, including several record labels and a cruise line). It is revealed in The Suite Life on Deck episode "A London Carol" that London at one time loved helping people, and that every Christmas she volunteered at homeless shelters.

Despite being born into wealth and privilege, London had a very unhappy childhood; her father almost seems to have made a hobby of neglecting her, and remarried so many times that London never felt she had a mother. The Suite Life on Deck reveals that her father married a girl named Karina because London wanted her out of her way of her relationship with a magician on the ship. London herself says that Karina is her father's fourteenth wife. It is also said in the finale of The Suite Life of Zack & Cody that her father has been married a dozen times in the past, though in an episode on The Suite Life on Deck, she stated that he has been married eight times, though this is possibly due to London's ignorance and inability to do math. It is also revealed that London is illiterate, due to her lack of education and neglect.

Her father did not attend any of London's special events (not even Christmas) because he was supposedly busy, as revealed by London to Maddie in the episode "Lip Synchin' in the Rain." As she grew older, she filled the void created by her father's absence with shopping, as Maddie discovers in the episode "Kisses & Basketball". Maddie claims that London buys clothes to cope with feelings of emptiness. In The Suite Life on Deck episode "The Beauty and the Fleeced", London admits to shopping when she is depressed.

In the episode "The Prince & the Plunger", Moseby convinces London to attend the father-daughter dance with Mr. Tipton, though London is convinced her father will not come. After Moseby gets the hotel in perfect condition and hires a band to welcome his boss, he learns that Mr. Tipton is a no-show, as London predicted. Moseby discovers London crying in the linen closet; her tough attitude about her father once again disappointing her is revealed to be a front. Moseby asks London if she would like him to be her escort to the dance, and she agrees.

At the age of 15, she met Maddie Fitzpatrick, who eventually becomes her best friend. At one point, London enrolled at Maddie's Catholic school, Our Lady of Perpetual Sorrow. Later on in the series, London was expelled because she did not attend her classes, so she is forced to go to Cheevers High School (where she also tends to skip classes). Then her father has her attend Seven Seas High, a high school program on the SS Tipton, because on a ship, she will not be able to run away.

== Biography ==
=== The Suite Life of Zack & Cody ===
London is a very spoiled, selfish, rich teenager with her own private suite at the Tipton Hotel in Boston, complete with floors full of closets (each with its own obsequious talking mirror), and a kitchen that takes up most of the floor. Her best friend is Maddie Fitzpatrick, whom London is essentially bribing to spend time with her. She is also very good friends with Zack and Cody. Though London can often be seen as a superficial snob who looks down on lower-class people, she does make exceptions for those whom she really cares about and has been shown to be loyal to her friends. She loves fashion, and states that she has been wearing designer outfits since she was a baby, and usually never wears the same outfit twice. She has a Pomeranian named Ivana Tipton who is treated like royalty. Since London has no nanny, or any adult to look out for her, she often looks to the Tipton employees for help and/or guidance. She dislikes her stepmothers and talks to Mr. Moseby, Maddie, and sometimes Carey about her problems. When happy, London tends to clap her hands repeatedly and jump up and down while saying her catchphrase, "Yay me!" Though it seems like London may lead the ultimate extravagant life, her childhood was far from perfect.

London has attended several private schools, but shows very little effort in her schoolwork. She transferred to the same private school as Maddie in the episode "Forever Plaid", due to poor attendance at her old school ("And they even expect me to go on Fridays!"). In the episode "First Day of High School", London transfers to Zack and Cody's public school, due to being expelled from all of the private schools she had previously attended. London's worst subject in school would probably be language arts, since she doesn't know how to read or write and often claims to have trouble with the alphabet. As stated earlier, London has below average intelligence. She is confused with many things, and is tricked by many characters such as Maddie and Nia. London, apparently, has some belief in certain mythological aspects; Maddie and Esteban once tricked her into doing many idiotic things by changing her horoscope. Though, annoying to some characters, London being gullible is found to be quite an advantage in difficult situations. It is also revealed in one episode that she must think before doing the smallest everyday actions. For example, she was walking through the lobby while thinking "left, right, blink, breathe" in the episode "Super Twins". London's gullibility tends to get the better of herself and it gives others the impression that she's not very bright, as shown in an episode of The Suite Life on Deck when London gullibly believed to be in an actual relationship with herself, even sending herself "surprise" gifts and then actually being surprised when she receives them, up to the point when she wrote herself a break-up letter and was truly heartbroken when she re-opened and read it a few moments later.

Having such a glamorous lifestyle, London also has trouble with anything that involves hard work, which is something her dad encourages her to do sometimes (much to the dismay of London), usually because of her frivolous money spending. London's poor ability is often caused by her lack of effort and understanding, as it's normally easy for her to get her own way in life. Though sometimes she'll put her ego aside, and show she can do more than she's given credit for, which shows her to being occasionally smart and/or selfless. Though curiously, her stupidity seems to have increased during season 3.

London has her own web-show, ever since the episode "Tiptonline". The original producer of Yay Me, Starring London Tipton was Cody Martin. After Cody quit, due to crazy things London made him do on set, London's friend Chelsea Brimmer became the producer, but Chelsea left after one webshow because she was a horrible producer and the fans demanded they bring Cody back. London then realized how she needed Cody and apologized to him on the air. After Cody saw the show, he rushed to London's suite in the middle of the show and stated that he would return. However, whenever Cody was unavailable, Maddie often filled in as a substitute, and soon became the official producer. London continues to do her webshow on the SS Tipton, with Woody Fink as her producer.

She sees her father in person only rarely, but she often talks to him on the telephone. London says that Mr. Moseby appears many more times in her family's photo albums than Mr. Tipton or any of his ex-wives.

Although she is not of Jewish descent, London observes Hanukkah. In "Big Hair & Baseball", while she and Carey swoon as the New York Yankees check into the Tipton, she says of the players, "They're even cuter than that hockey team Daddy bought me for Hanukkah". In "Cookin' with Romeo and Juliet", London states that she's used to getting everything she wants on her birthday, Christmas, and Hanukkah. When Maddie points out that London shouldn't be able to celebrate Hanukkah since she isn't Jewish, London replies "And miss out on 8 days of presents? Not this Shiksa." Throughout the series, London peppers her speech with other Yiddish vernacular, such as "Oy Vey," "Plotz," and "Mazel Tov."

London hates to work out but has been shown to be very strong in several episodes. She is also tone deaf, but still likes to sing. It is revealed in "Super Twins" she is also easily hypnotized, which is also shown in The Suite Life on Deck.

=== The Suite Life on Deck ===
London journeys onto the SS Tipton with the belief that she is on a vacation, until she is informed otherwise by Mr. Moseby that it is for her to attend Seven Seas High (or as London refers to it, "stupid sea-school") so she can attend school properly without skipping class. London bitterly sees this as more of a punishment than an opportunity. When London finds out later that she has to share a cabin, she bribes her cabin-mate, Padma, with jewelry to leave in "The Suite Life Sets Sail", so she can have her own cabin. At the end of the episode, Bailey Pickett is revealed to be a girl, who prompts her to be assigned in London's half-vacant cabin. This pushes a stubborn London to escape the SS Tipton via helicopter to Parrot Island, after bribing an employee. Therefore, in the following episode, the ship makes a special journey to the island to rescue her, as she has been imprisoned because Tipton Industries cut down Parrot Island's trees, which made the native parrots immigrate to Seal Island close by. Later, she writes a check for $10 million to rehabilitate the island and resumes residence on the SS Tipton.

At the school, London is treated like a regular student. In order to skid her way through school, London has often tried to bribe the teacher (such as handing in a blank report with $100 bills on each page). However, she has been seen putting a little more effort into her schoolwork, and even states in the episode "Sea Monster Mash" that she enjoys having a feeling of accomplishment. In another episode Cody and Bailey use the placebo effect on her to help her work smarter in school and to their amazement she actually starts getting passing grades. London is also slightly smarter than what she was in The Suite Life of Zack & Cody, as seen in multiple episodes (though she still retains the ditzy demeanor). Also, despite her frequent attempts to escape the SS Tipton so she can resume her normal free life, London has found ways to adapt on the ship. Since London now has limited closet space in her cabin, it is mentioned that most of her clothes are carried by a submarine that follows the ship, though she continues to find more room, such as a yacht and a blimp, even once rented out a cabin under a fake name to use it as a closet.

London quickly establishes a tenuous friendship with Bailey. In "Broke N' Yo-Yo", she moves Bailey to a cramped loft near the ceiling of the cabin, and Bailey retaliates by faking an attack of fictional "Sea Snarks", but eventually comes clean and they agree to share the cabin equally. London later reunites with Ivana, her dog, flown in by a helicopter in "The Kidney of the Sea", and Cody referees an intelligence competition between her dog and Bailey's pet, Porkers the pig, but in the end Ivana and Porkers end in a draw. London occasionally mistreats Bailey, such as humiliating her using her webshow, Yay Me on a segment called "Boo You". Despite this, London means well as a friend and Bailey is willing to forgive her.

Although London admits that she doesn't "do things for other people", she has often attempted to do many generous things, with unfortunate results. In "Mom and Dad On Deck", she hoped to find Moseby the perfect gift for his birthday but resulted in her annoyingly following him everywhere in order to find out what he likes. She even tried to nurse Moseby after he got injured slipping on the sky deck, but only ends up making him feel crowded. In the same episode, it is revealed that it takes her half-an-hour to read one page in even the simplest books (she reads 'The Pokey Little Princess' to Moseby, and her problem is revealed). In the season two episode "Smarticle Particles", Bailey tricks London into doing well in school by giving her a "smart perfume" (as a placebo), to which London responds to as planned. However, London finds out later that the perfume is fake, and is upset that her 'smarticles' weren't real, and she states while crying that she can't be smart now, and that she likes "being smart" Bailey then cheers her up with a "smart lipstick", which London happily uses. This shows that London is actually very bright but lacks enough confidence to believe so. But other instances conclude that she doesn't know very much at all (e.g., in "Marriage 101", when she's mentioned the number of her father's marriages she holds up six fingers, though clearly saying "eight"). In "Family Thais", the gang travels to Thailand, where London meets her grandmother, and at first is upset, and disgusted after finding out that she was a farmer. In "Lost at Sea", London pretends to go insane and that she's on an island resort in order not to have to do any work. After they finally escape the island in a balloon made out of her clothes and fly back to the SS Tipton, she reveals her deception and makes Cody and Bailey acknowledge she's a lot smarter than they give her credit for. She is also seen to be precise with her hands, such as when she repaired a small boat with various eyebrow care products in "Cruisin' for a Bruisin'".

In the season three episode "Silent Treatment", after Bailey is ready to go onto the Sky Deck carrying a cat in a dress, London snaps Bailey out of her depression after her breakup with Cody by calling Bailey young, smart and pretty, which she responds to in shock. In "My Oh Maya", London pretends to be Zack's ex-girlfriend to help him get a girl and pretends to be Marcus' wife to get Dante (Marcus' identity thief) off the ship. It isn't revealed whether or not she did it for free but it can be assumed that because she is maturing she did it without cost. Since then she has been displaying continuous signs of attraction towards Zack. In the last episode, it was shown she would miss Mr. Moseby, since he was the one that raised her.

London Tipton's last line in the series is "Little me, off to Paris", in a French accent, apparently trying to sound rich, smart, and sophisticated. This line mirrored her line in the original series "Little me, back from Paris".

== Reception ==
The show's breakout character, London has garnered much media recognition, and Song's performance received widespread acclaim from critics and audiences. Song became a household name after The Suite Life of Zack & Cody debuted in 2005. In an April 2009 andPOP.com article, they stated that as London Tipton "Song is the One to Steal the Spotlight" on the Disney Channel. They said: "If you ever watched an episode of 'The Suite Life with Zack & Cody' you should realize that show is watchable because of one character: London Tipton. Brenda plays the ditzy spoiled hotel heiress London (yup, an allusion to Paris Hilton) and, if I could say so myself, she does quite an excellent job doing so." While commenting on Song, MSN's 2009 cover story of the series states, "Song is one of the main reasons why the "Suite Life" franchise remains one of the most successful and highly rated series in the Disney stable." In a 2009 article, People magazine described the character as a "melodramatic high-seas diva." AllMovie described Song as a "charming and appealing personality, even when playing a shallow airhead".

In August 2006, Song won an Asian Excellence Award for "Outstanding Newcomer" because of her portrayal of London Tipton in the series. Song was also named the "Queen of Disney" by Cosmogirl Magazine due to her major contributions on the Disney Channel including her leading role in the Suite Life series. Song ranked ninth in Netscape's 2007 "Top 10 Beautiful Petites in Entertainment", was voted one of AOL's "Top 20 Tween (and Teen) Television Stars", and Maxim ranked Song as the "Top Female Television Actress" in the winter of 2008 for her breakout performance as London Tipton in The Suite Life on Deck. Song was also ranked #45 in AIM's "Top 100 Celebs Under 25" list. TV Guide listed Song in its 2008 list of "13 Hottest Young Stars to Watch" for her portrayal of London Tipton. Zap2it named London Tipton the "Most Stylish" character of 2008 and one of "TV & Movie Shopaholics".
