= Phill Lewis =

American actor, comedian and director (born 1968)

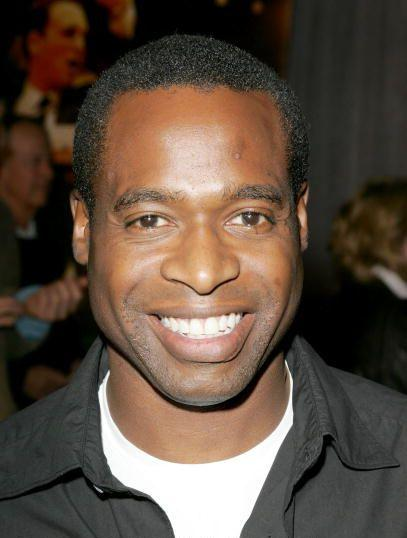
- Lewis in 2006
- Born: Phillip David Lewis; February 14, 1968 (age 58); Arua, Uganda
- Occupations: Actor; comedian; television director
- Years active: 1986–present
- Spouse: Megan Benton Lewis
- Children: 2
- Parents: Delano Lewis (father); Gayle Carolyn Jones (mother)

Phillip David Lewis (born February 14, 1968) is an American actor, comedian, and director. He is best known for playing hotel manager Mr. Moseby on the Disney Channel series The Suite Life of Zack & Cody and its spin-off, The Suite Life on Deck. Lewis has also appeared in series such as Lizzie McGuire, Friends, The Wayans Bros., Yes, Dear, Scrubs, and How I Met Your Mother.

== Early life ==
Lewis was born on February 14, 1968, in Uganda to American parents. His father, Delano Lewis, served as the U.S. Peace Corps' associate director and country director for Nigeria and Uganda at the time and would later serve as the United States Ambassador to South Africa. Lewis has three brothers.

== Career ==
Lewis made his film debut as Dennis in the 1988 dark comedy Heathers. In 1991, he was cast in the lead role of the short-lived CBS sitcom Teech. The series was cancelled after thirteen episodes. He has appeared in smaller roles in other films, including City Slickers (1991), Bowfinger (1999), I Spy (2002), Surviving Christmas (2004), Kicking & Screaming (2005), and Beverly Hills Chihuahua 2 (2011). He also appeared in guest parts on various television series including Sister Sister, Pacific Blue, JAG, Ally McBeal, Joan of Arcadia, Brothers & Sisters, 8 Simple Rules, Buffy the Vampire Slayer, Friends and How I Met Your Mother. Lewis has also had recurring roles on A Different World, The Wayans Bros., Lizzie McGuire, Yes, Dear, Scrubs, and Raising Hope.

Starting in 2005, Lewis co-starred in the Disney Channel original series The Suite Life of Zack & Cody as Mr. Moseby. In 2008, he reprised the role on a spin-off The Suite Life on Deck, where he played the manager of The S.S. Tipton. He has appeared as a guest star on Disney Channel's That's So Raven, Phineas and Ferb, and Jessie, and also in one of the channel's original films, Dadnapped. On the children's series Special Agent Oso, he had a recurring role as the voice of Agent Wolfie. Lewis guest appeared in “227” as “Ken” in season 2, episode 7.

As a television director, he directed eight episodes of The Suite Life on Deck, first making his directorial debut with The Suite Life of Zack & Cody episode "I Want My Mummy" (2007). He has since gone on to direct episodes of the Disney Channel sitcoms A.N.T. Farm, Austin & Ally, Good Luck Charlie, Kickin' It and Jessie. His other television directing credits include Malibu Country, Mike & Molly, 2 Broke Girls, The Soul Man, Sullivan & Son, Melissa & Joey, Young & Hungry, The Odd Couple, One Day at a Time, and Indebted. He also directed the live episode of Undateable in 2015 that secured a third season for the series.

From 2017 to 2019, Lewis directed fifteen episodes of Netflix sitcom One Day at a Time.

== Personal life ==
=== Legal issues ===
In late December 1991, Lewis was arrested after he fatally struck Isabel Duarte, a resident of Bethesda, Maryland, in a car crash. He was charged with manslaughter and driving while intoxicated. His blood alcohol level at the time measured three times the limit for legal intoxication. The court sentenced Lewis to five years in prison, but suspended four, citing Lewis' work after his arrest with a prison-based theater troupe that performed in jails, schools, and churches, to highlight the consequences of drug use. Lewis was also ordered to serve two years' probation after his release and to perform 350 hours of community service.

=== Marriage and family ===
Lewis is married to Megan Benton Lewis and has two daughters. He is Catholic.

== Filmography ==
=== Film ===
Year	Title	Role	Notes
1988	Heathers	Dennis	
1989	How I Got Into College	Herman	
1991	City Slickers	Dr. Steven Jessup	
1991	Brother Future	T.J.	
1992	Aces: Iron Eagle III	'Tee Vee'	Alternative title: Iron Eagle III
1999	Bowfinger	Actor At Audition	
2000	What Planet Are You From?	Other MD	
2002	I Spy	Jerry	
2004	Elvis Has Left the Building	Charlie	
2004	Surviving Christmas	Levine, The Lawyer	
2005	Kicking & Screaming	John Ryan	
2008	Pretty Ugly People	Raye	
2009	Dadnapped	Maurice	
2011	Beverly Hills Chihuahua 2	Mr. McKibble	Direct-to-video
2014	Wish I Was Here	Nerd	

=== Television ===
Year	Title	Role	Notes
1986	Hill Street Blues	Parker	Episode: "Amazing Grace"
1986	227	Ken	Episode: "Come Into Parlor"
1987	Starman	J.B.	Episode: "The Test"
1987	Amen	Marvin	Episode: "Deacon on the Line"
1987	Frank's Place	Homer	2 episodes
1987–1988	The Bronx Zoo	Schuyler Tate	2 episodes
1988	Sonny Spoon	Aaron Fortune	Episode: "Crimes Below the Waist"
1988–1989	A Different World	Sam Lee	4 episodes
1989	CBS Schoolbreak Special	Justin Cook	Episode: "My Past Is My Own"
1989	TV 101	Noah Hawkins	Episode: "Kangaroo Gate"
1990	Charles in Charge	Bernie	Episode: "Buddy Flips a Disc"
1991	Teech	Teech Gibson	Lead role, 12 episodes
1994	Hardball	Arnold Nixon	Main role, 9 episodes
1994	Living Single	J.T.	Episode: "U.N.I.T.Y."
1995, 1998	Sister, Sister	Mr. Berry, Clifton McNair	3 Episodes
1995–1998	The Wayans Bros.	T.C.	Recurring role, 20 episodes
1996	Married... with Children	George	Episode: "Enemies"
1997	The Drew Carey Show	Mike	Episode: "Drew vs. Mimi: Part 2"
1997	Over the Top	William Brackett	Episode: "Simon, We Hardly Knew Ye"
1997–1998	Sparks	Detective Floyd Pitts	3 episodes
1998	Buffy the Vampire Slayer	Mr. Platt	Episode: "Beauty and the Beasts"
1999	Party of Five	Detective Danner	Episode: "Witness for the Persecution"
1999	Chicago Hope	Detective Davis	2 episodes
2000	JAG	Petty Officer Scalline	Episode: "Drop Zone"
2000	Ally McBeal	District Attorney Kessler	Episode: "I Will Survive"
2000–2001	Family Law	Lawyer	3 episodes
2001	Dharma & Greg	Mr. Walden	Episode: "With a Little Help from My Friend"
2001–2002	Lizzie McGuire	Principal Tweedy	4 episodes
2001–2006	Yes, Dear	Roy Barr	Recurring role, 10 episodes
2002	American Bikers	Tyrell (voice)	Episode: "The Age of Bikers: Part 1"
2003	Friends	Steve	3 episodes
2003	Joan of Arcadia	Naval Officer God	Episode: "The Boat"
2004	8 Simple Rules	Cop	Episode: "Consequences"
2005–2008	The Suite Life of Zack & Cody	Marion Moseby	Main role, 87 episodes
2005–2009, 2026	Scrubs	'Crazy' Hooch	6 episodes
2005–2023	American Dad!	Duper (voice)	8 episodes
2006	That's So Raven	Marion Moseby	Episode: "Checkin' Out"
2007	Brothers & Sisters	Dr. Peter Edwards	Episode: "An American Family"
2007	How I Met Your Mother	Loan Officer	Episode: "Dowisetrepla"
2008–2011	The Suite Life on Deck	Marion Moseby	Main role, 55 episodes
2009	Wizards of Waverly Place	Marion Moseby	Episode: "Cast Away (To Another Show)"
2009	Hannah Montana	Marion Moseby	Episode: "Super(sticious) Girl"
2009–2012	Special Agent Oso	Special Agent Wolfie	Main voice role, 22 episodes
2010	I'm in the Band	Marion Moseby	Episode: "Weasels On Deck"
2010	The Big C	Pool Man	2 episodes
2010	Phineas and Ferb	Hawaiian Hotel Manager	Voice role, episode: "Phineas and Ferb Hawaiian Vacation"
2011	The Suite Life Movie	Marion Moseby	Television movie
2011	Raising Hope	Donovan	2 episodes
2011	Good Luck Charlie	Johnny's Dad	Episode: "Bye Bye Video Diary"
2015	Jessie	Marion Moseby	Episode: "Karate Kid-tastrophe"
2015	Your Family or Mine	Award Presenter	Episode: "The Speech"
2015	Nicky, Ricky, Dicky & Dawn	The Mayor	Episode: "The Mighty Quad Squad"
2015	Undateable	Judge Lewis	Episode: "An Angry Judge Walks Into A Bar"
2016	Angel from Hell	Walt	2 episodes
2020	The Healing Powers of Dude	Reginald (voice)	Episode: "Second Step: Homeroom"
2023	The Really Loud House	Mr. Rickshaw	Episode: "The Manager with the Planager"
2025	Super Duper Bunny League	Supreme Leader (voice)	Episode: "Cool Dudes from Space"

=== Director ===
Year	Title	Notes
2007	The Suite Life of Zack & Cody	Episode: "I Want My Mummy"
2008–2011	The Suite Life on Deck	9 episodes
2011–2013	Good Luck Charlie	6 episodes
2011–2014	A.N.T. Farm	5 episodes
2011–2015	Jessie	9 episodes
2012–2014	Mike & Molly	27 episodes
2013	The Soul Man	2 episodes
2013	Melissa & Joey	Episode: "What Happens in Jersey...: Part 2"
2013–2014	2 Broke Girls	11 episodes
2013–2014	Sullivan & Son	4 episodes
2014	Friends with Better Lives	2 episodes
2014	The Millers	Episode: "You Are the Wind Beneath My Wings, Man"
2014–2016	Undateable	21 episodes
2014–2016	Young & Hungry	6 episodes
2015	The McCarthys	Episode: "Sister Act"
2015	Hot in Cleveland	Episode: "Scandalous"
2015	K.C. Undercover	Episode: "The Get Along Vault"
2015–2017	The Odd Couple	12 episodes
2016–2017	Dr. Ken	10 episodes
2016–2024	Bunk'd	14 episodes
2017	Man with a Plan	Episode: "The Three Amigos"
2017	Fuller House	Episode: "Soul Sister"
2017–2018	Superior Donuts	7 episodes
2017–2018	Marlon	6 episodes
2017–2020	One Day at a Time	19 episodes
2018	Alexa & Katie	Episode: "Support Group"
2018	All About The Washingtons	Episode: "Follow the Leaker"
2018	Happy Together	4 episodes
2018–2019	The Cool Kids	4 episodes
2019	Last Man Standing	Episode: "Common Ground"
2019	Abby's	2 episodes
2019	Mr. Iglesias	2 episodes
2019	No Good Nick	4 episodes
2019	Carol's Second Act	Episode: "The Zebra"
2019	The Neighborhood	2 episodes
2019	Merry Happy Whatever	2 episodes
2020	Indebted	7 episodes
2020	The Big Show Show	3 episodes
2020	Broke	2 episodes
2021	Pretty Smart	3 episodes
2021	B Positive	5 episodes
2021	Head of the Class	9 episodes; also executive producer and guest star
2021–2023	iCarly	12 episodes
2022	How We Roll	2 episodes
2022–2023	Call Me Kat	8 episodes
2022–2023	How I Met Your Father	3 episodes
2022–2023	The Really Loud House	2 episodes
2022–2024	Lopez vs Lopez	7 episodes
2023	American Auto	Episode: "Passion Project"
2023	Frasier	Episode: "The Founders' Society"
2024	Night Court	2 episodes
2024	Extended Family	Episode: "The Consequences of Familial Obligations"
2024–2025	Poppa's House	2 episodes
2025	The Thundermans: Undercover	2 episodes
2025	Electric Bloom	Episode: "How We Tried to Crash a Party"
2025	Vampirina: Teenage Vampire	Episode: "First Nightmare"
