= List of ballparks used in film and television =

This list includes ballparks that may have been used as settings in filmmaking and television productions. Footage of actual sports events is most likely not included unless it was potentially used as stock footage or otherwise woven into a fictional storyline of a film or TV show. References are typically within the individual articles. This is not necessarily an exhaustive list.

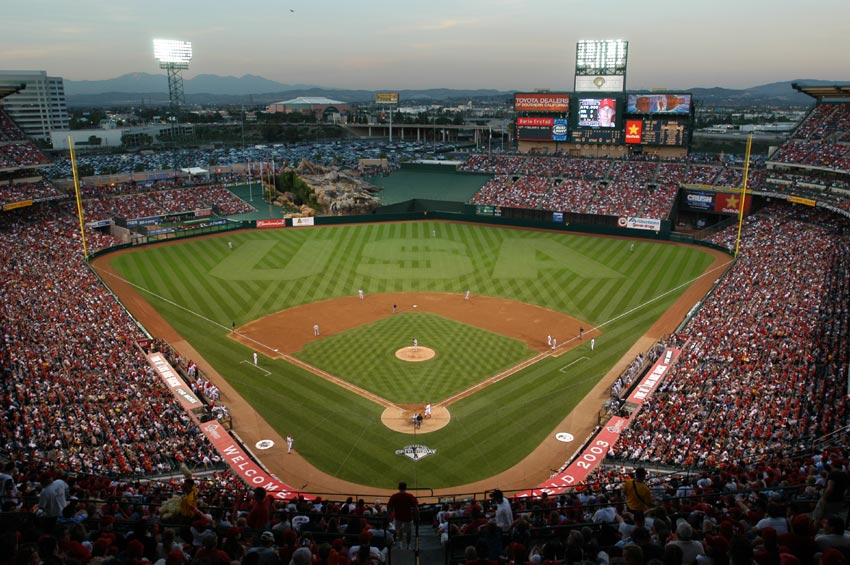

Anaheim Stadium, Anaheim, California

- Angels in the Outfield, 1994 film (exterior and sky shots)
- Deuce Bigalow: Male Gigolo, 1999 film

Astrodome, Houston

- Brewster McCloud, 1970 film (many scenes)
- The Bad News Bears in Breaking Training, 1977 film (many scenes)
- Murder at the World Series, 1977 made-for-TV film (several scenes)
- Night Game, 1989 film (many scenes)

Atlanta–Fulton County Stadium, Atlanta

- The Slugger's Wife, 1985 film (many scenes)

Bosse Field, Evansville, Indiana

- A League of Their Own, 1992 (secondary setting, as home of the Racine Belles)

Bush Stadium, Indianapolis, Indiana

- Eight Men Out, 1988 film (standing in for both Comiskey Park and Redland Field)

Candlestick Park, San Francisco, California

- Experiment in Terror, 1962 film (closing scenes)
- The Fan, 1996 film (many scenes)

Citi Field, Queens, New York

- Sharknado 2: The Second One, 2014 film
- Avengers: Endgame, 2019 film
- Yesterday, 2019 film

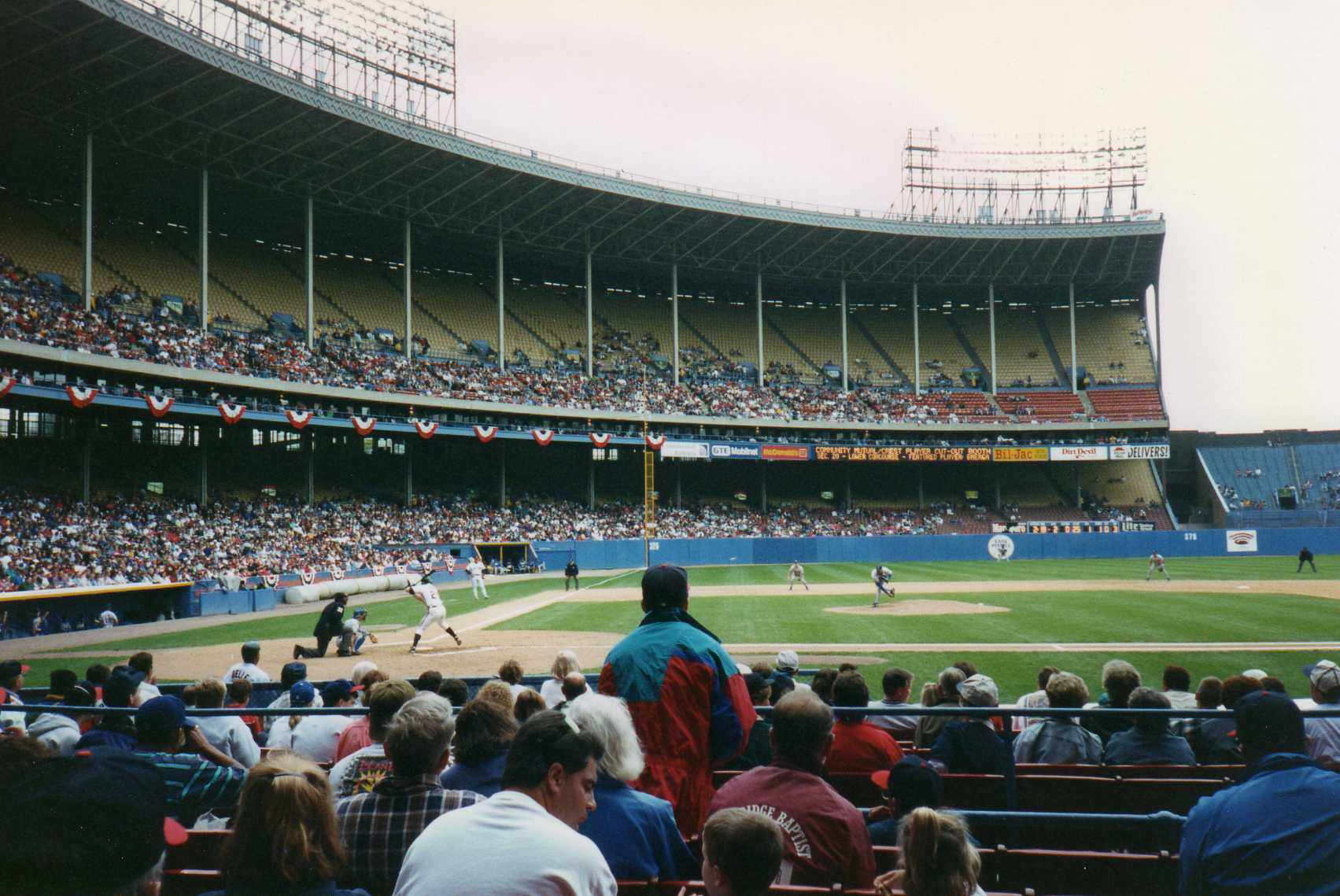

Cleveland Stadium, Cleveland, Ohio

- The Fortune Cookie, 1965 film - first of many films starring Jack Lemmon & Walter Matthau. Story about a CBS cameraman (Lemmon) knocked unconscious during a Cleveland Browns vs Minnesota Vikings game. His shyster lawyer brother-in-law (Matthau) sees opportunity for a windfall of money. Matthau won the Best Supporting Academy Award from this film. Directed by Billy Wilder.
- Major League, 1989 film (primary setting, but only a few scenes were actually shot there)

College Park, Charleston, South Carolina

- Major League: Back to the Minors, 1998 film (primary setting)

Comiskey Park, Chicago

- The Pride of the Yankees, 1942 film (some scenes)
- The Stratton Story, 1949 film (many scenes)
- Only the Lonely, 1991 film (one scene)

Daikin Park, Houston, Texas

- Boyhood, 2014 film (one scene)

Dodger Stadium, Los Angeles, California

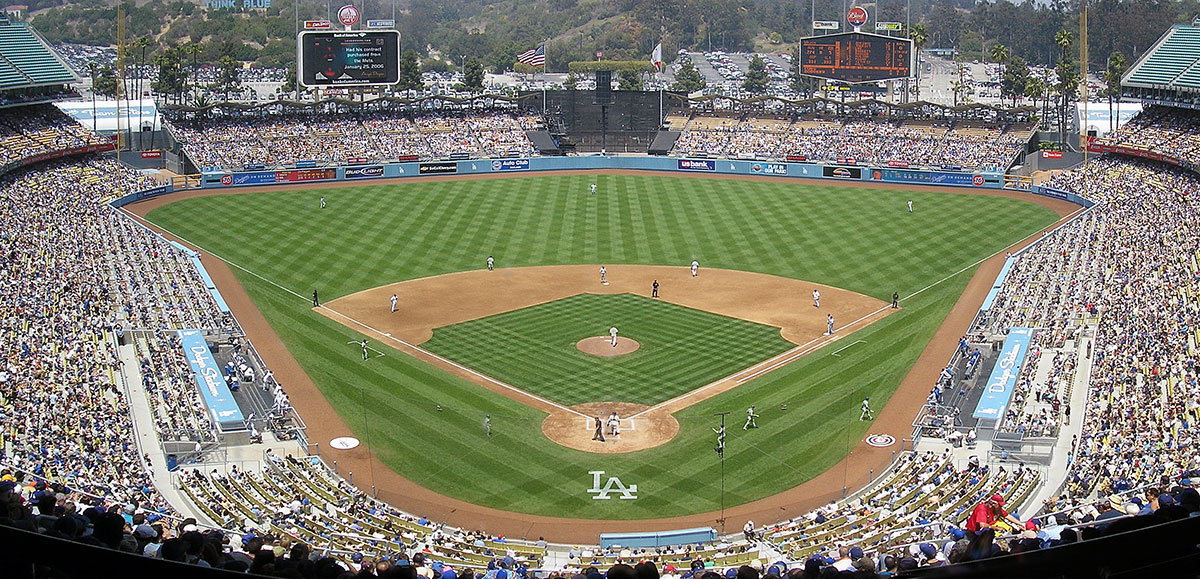

- Mr. Ed episode, "Leo Durocher Meets Mr. Ed", first aired Sep 29, 1963
- Hickey & Boggs, 1972 film (a few scenes)
- Better Off Dead, 1985 film (closing scenes)
- 52 Pick-Up, 1986 film (one scene set during Dodgers-Mets game on May 16, 1986)
- The Naked Gun: From the Files of Police Squad!, 1988 film (closing scenes)
- The Sandlot, 1993 film (cameo)
- The Fast and the Furious, 2001 film (opening scene driving in the parking lot)
- Clubhouse, 2004 TV series (standing in for a fictional New York stadium)
- Superman Returns 2006 film (one scene, with CGI alterations)
- Transformers, 2007 film (one scene)

Dolphin Stadium, Miami, Florida

- ’’Marley & Me 2008 film, (One Scene)

Doubleday Field, Cooperstown, New York

- A League of Their Own, 1992 film (closing scenes)

Durham Athletic Park, Durham, North Carolina

- Bull Durham, 1988 film (many scenes)

Ebbets Field, Brooklyn, New York

- Roogie's Bump,

Ernie Shore Field, Winston-Salem, North Carolina

- Mr. Destiny, 1990 (several scenes)

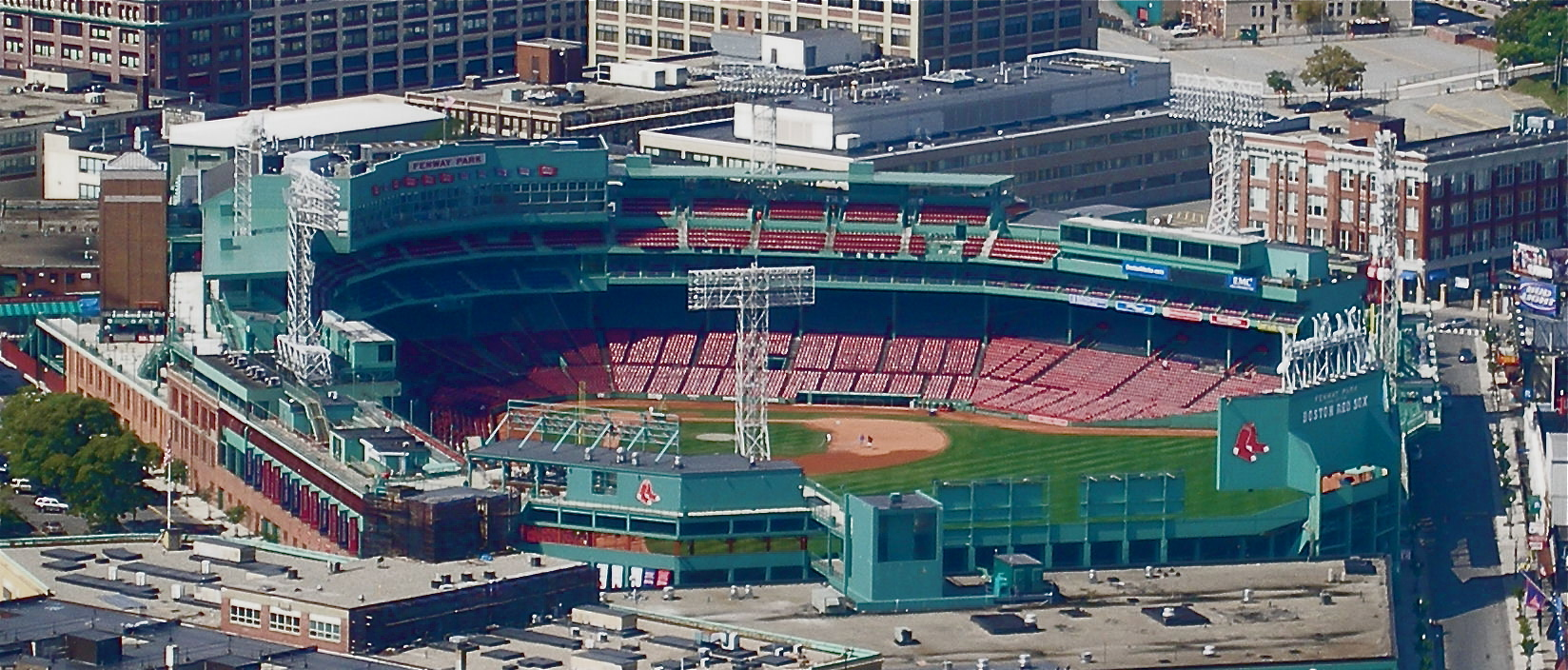

Fenway Park, Boston, Massachusetts

- Field of Dreams, 1989 film (cameo)
- Fever Pitch, 2005 film
- The Town, 2010 film (lengthy scene depicting a robbery)
- Moneyball (film), 2011 film (one scene)
- Ted (film), 2012 film (one scene)
- Patriots Day (film), 2016 film (one scene)

Forbes Field, Pittsburgh, Pennsylvania

- Angels in the Outfield, 1951 film

Gilmore Field, Los Angeles, California

- The Stratton Story, 1949 film

Grayson Stadium, Savannah, Georgia

- The Bingo Long Traveling All-Stars & Motor Kings, 1976 film (some scenes)

Griffith Stadium, Washington, D.C.

- Damn Yankees, 1958 film (crowd scenes)

John O'Donnell Stadium, Davenport, Iowa

- Sugar, 2008 film (many scenes)

League Stadium, Huntingburg, Indiana

- A League of Their Own, 1992 (primary setting, as home of the Rockford Peaches)
- Soul of the Game, 1996 film (primary baseball setting)

Luther Williams Field, Macon, Georgia

- The Bingo Long Traveling All-Stars & Motor Kings, 1976 film (many scenes)

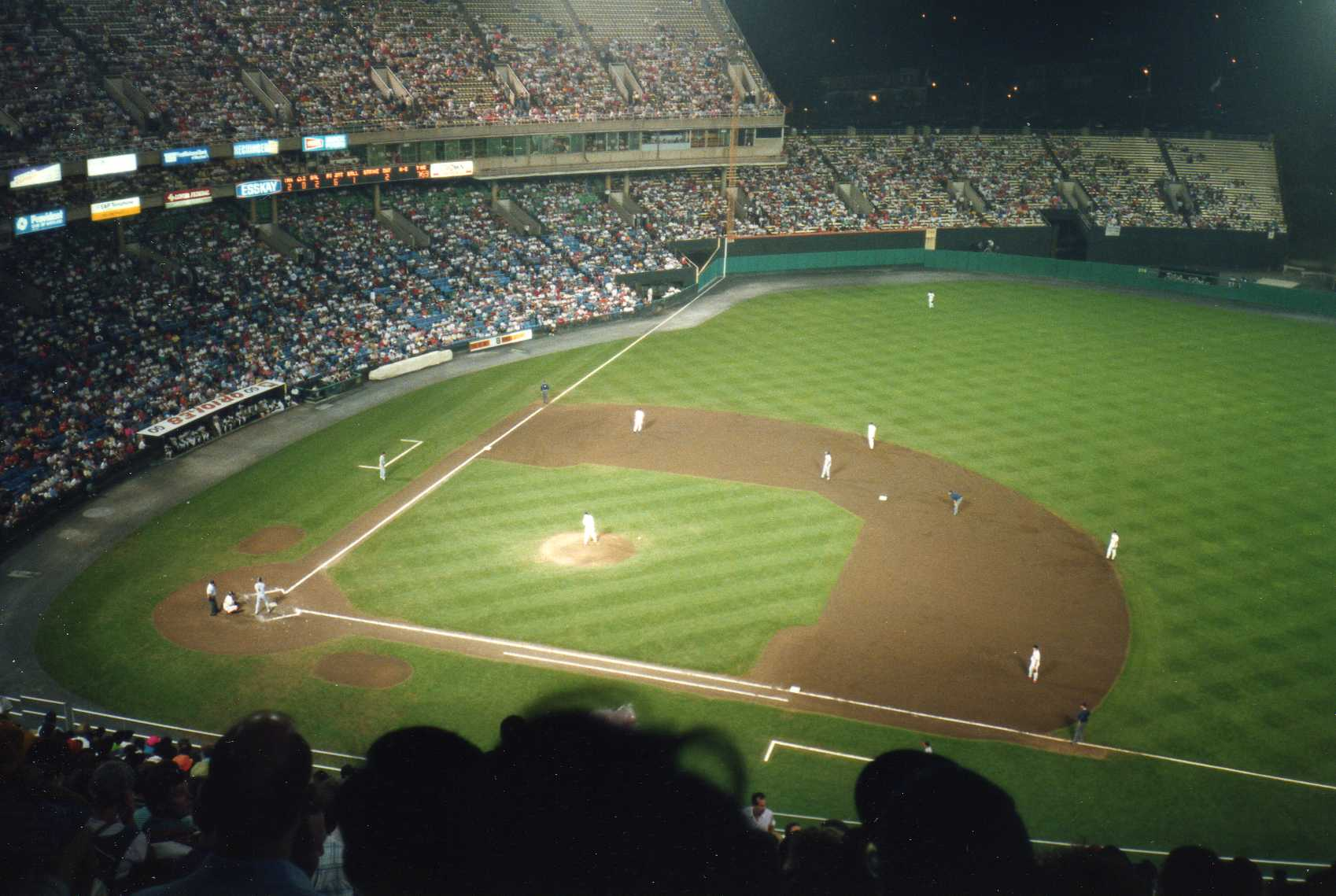

Memorial Stadium, Baltimore, Maryland

- Tin Men, 1987 film (exteriors, background)
- Homicide: Life on the Street, 1993–99 TV series (occasional scenes)
- Major League II, 1994 film (some scenes)

Metrodome, Minneapolis, Minnesota

- Little Big League, 1994 film (primary setting)
- Major League: Back to the Minors, 1998 film (secondary setting)

Miller Park, Milwaukee, Wisconsin

- Mr. 3000, 2004 film (several scenes)

Milwaukee County Stadium, Milwaukee, Wisconsin

- Major League, 1989 film (standing in for the primary setting of Cleveland Stadium)

Nationals Park, Washington, District of Columbia

- How Do You Know, 2010 film (one scene)

Oakland–Alameda County Coliseum, Oakland, California

- Angels in the Outfield, 1994 film (primary setting)
- Moneyball (film), 2011 film (primary scene)

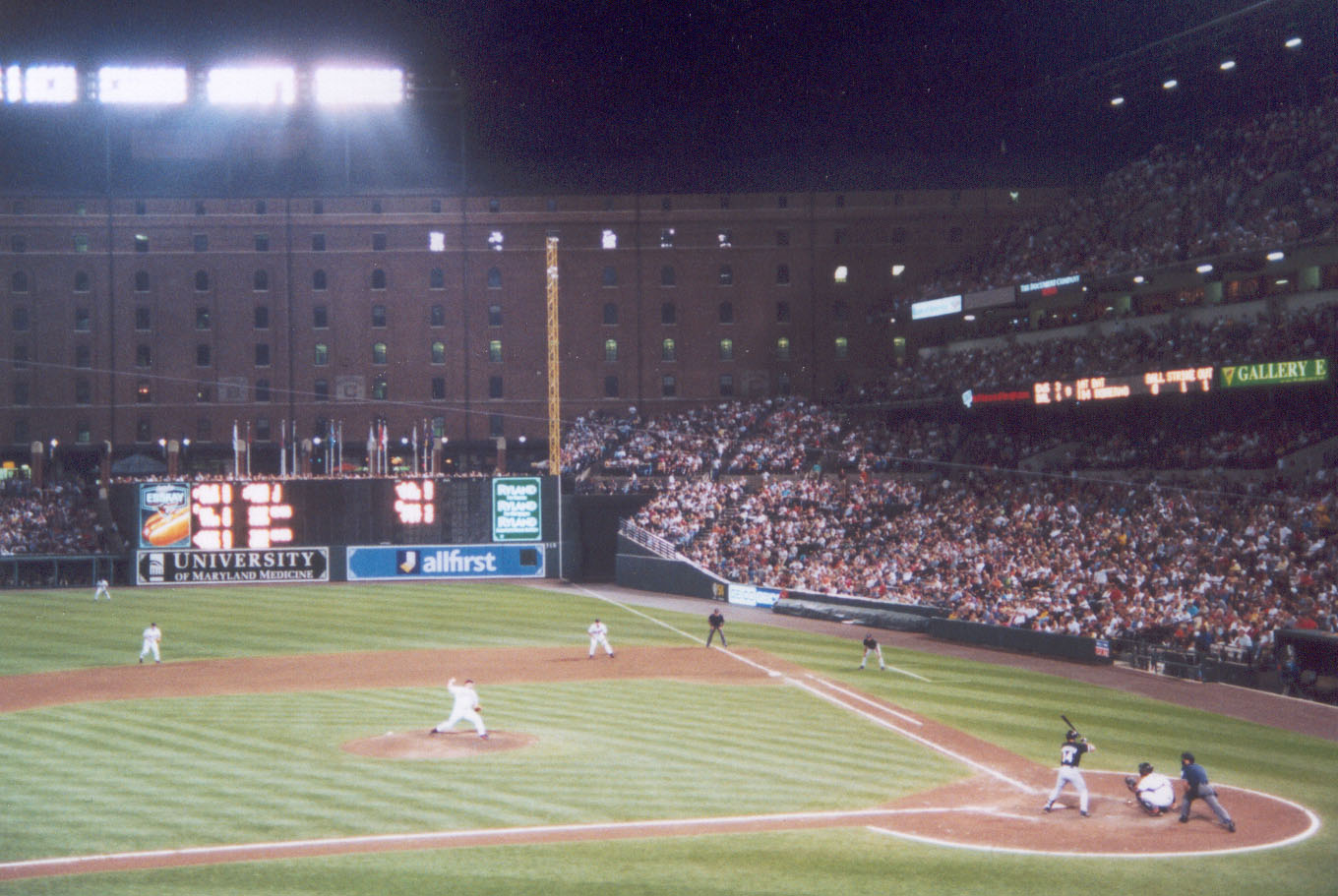

Oriole Park at Camden Yards, Baltimore, Maryland

- Dave, 1993 film (cameo)
- Homicide: Life on the Street, 1993–99 TV series (occasional scenes)
- Major League II, 1994 film (primary setting)

PNC Park, Pittsburgh, Pennsylvania

- Chasing 3000, 2008 film
- Abduction, 2011 film

Rangers Ballpark in Arlington, Arlington, Texas

- The Rookie, 2002 film (primary setting)

Safeco Field, Seattle

- Life, or Something Like It, 2002 film (some scenes)

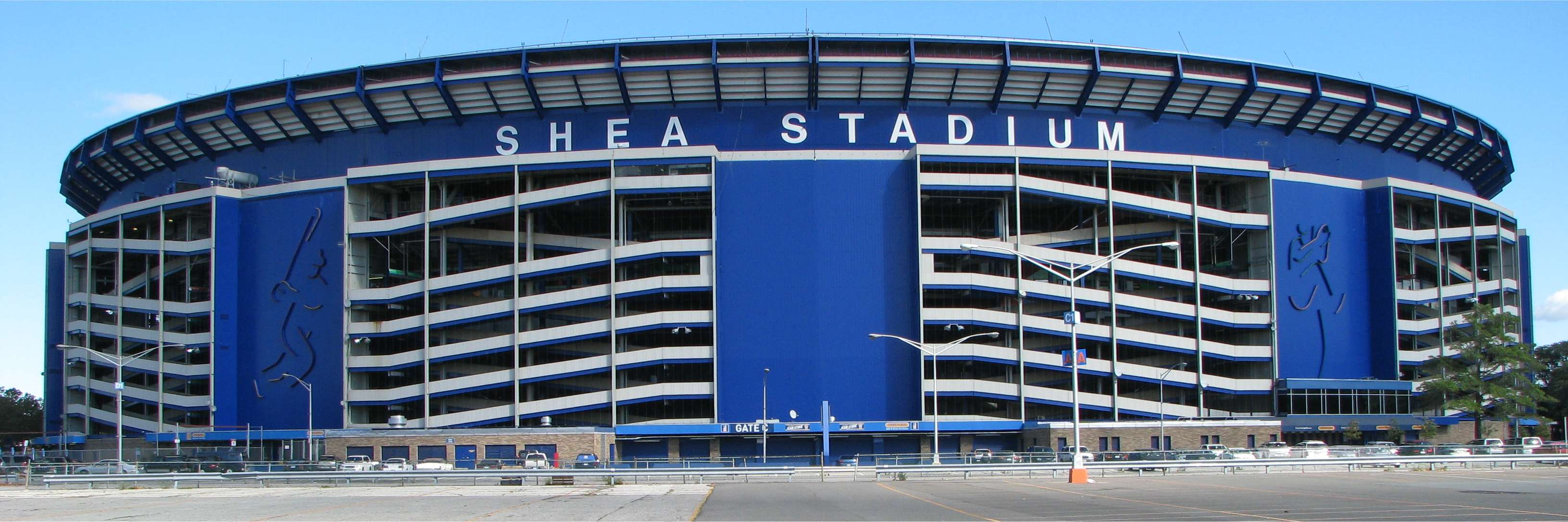

Shea Stadium, Queens, New York

- The Odd Couple, 1968 (cameo)
- Bang the Drum Slowly, 1973 film (many scenes)
- The Wiz, 1978 film (flying monkeys chase)
- Seven Minutes in Heaven (film), 1985 film (one scene)
- Seinfeld, TV series, 1992 episode "The Boyfriend" (cameo)
- Men in Black, 1997 film (one scene)
- Two Weeks Notice, 2002 film (one scene)

Sportsman's Park, St. Louis, Missouri

- The Pride of St. Louis, 1952 film
- The Winning Team, another 1952 film
- The Pride of the Yankees, 1942 film (cameo)

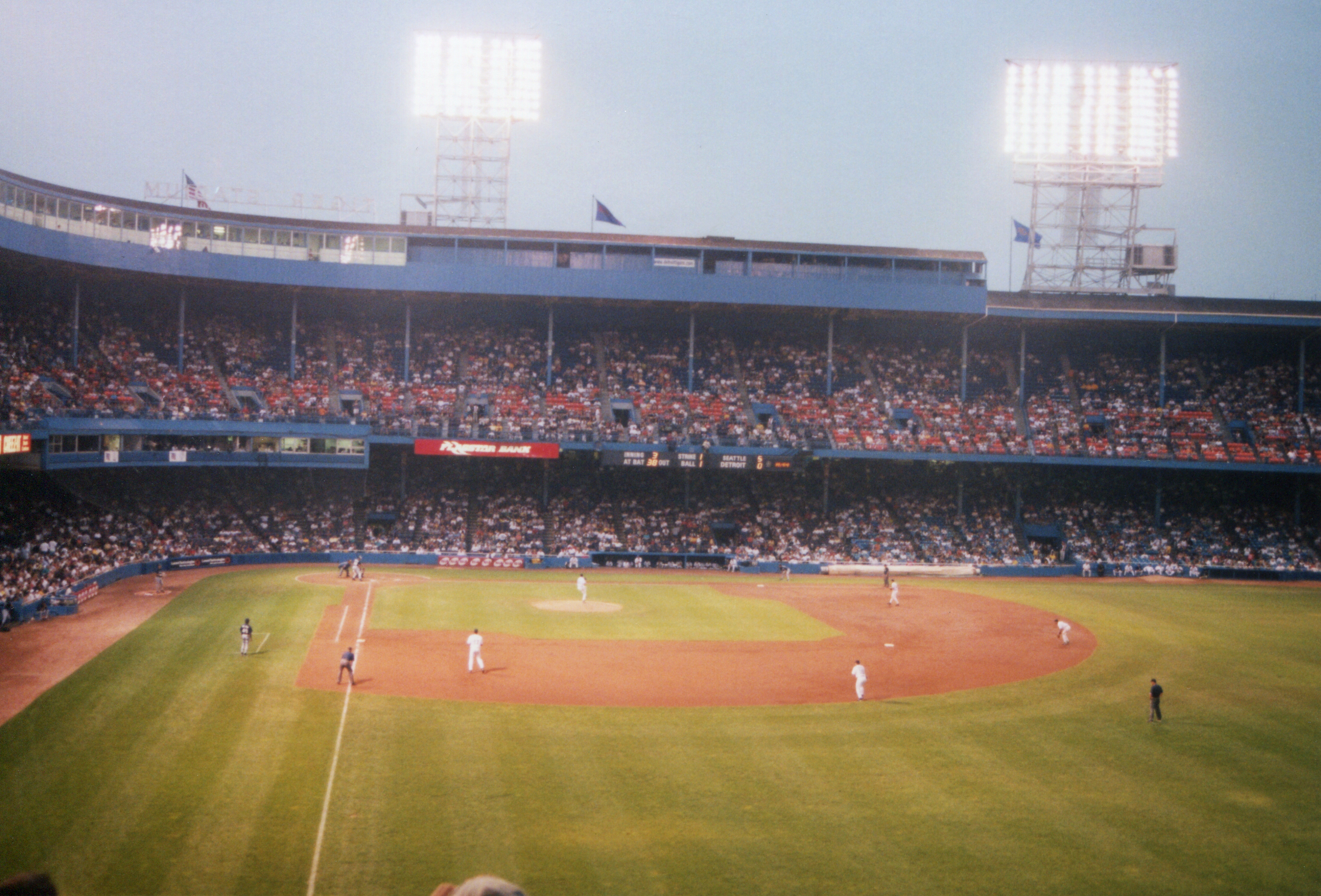

Tiger Stadium, Detroit, Michigan

- The Pride of the Yankees, 1942 film (some scenes)
- One in a Million: The Ron LeFlore Story, 1978, made-for-TV film (many scenes)
- Tiger Town, 1983, made-for-TV film (many scenes)
- 61*, 2001, made-for-TV film (primary setting and Tiger Stadium)
- Hardball, 2001, (one scene as 'Chicago Field')
- Hung, 2009, pilot episode of HBO TV show
- Kill the Irishman, 2011

Turner Field, Atlanta, Georgia

- The Change-Up, 2011 film
- Trouble with the Curve, 2012 film
- Flight, 2012 film

U. S. Cellular Field, Chicago

- Rookie of the Year, 1993 film (some scenes)
- Little Big League, 1994 film (all games played by the featured Minnesota Twins on the road)
- Major League II, 1994 film (some scenes)
- My Best Friend's Wedding, 1997 film (cameo)

War Memorial Stadium, Buffalo, New York

- The Natural, 1984 film

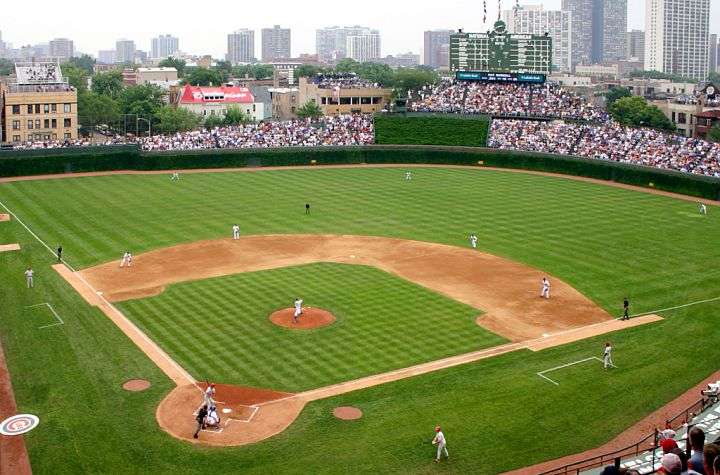

Wrigley Field, Chicago

- Wrigley scenes in 1984 film The Natural were actually filmed at All-High Stadium in Buffalo, New York
- The Blues Brothers, 1980 film (cameo)
- Ferris Bueller's Day Off, 1986 film (one scene)
- About Last Night..., 1986 film (one scene)
- The Naked Gun: From the Files of Police Squad!, 1988 film (cameo)
- A League of Their Own, 1992 film (early scenes, as fictional Harvey Field)
- Rookie of the Year, 1993 film (primary setting)
- I Want Someone to Eat Cheese With, 2006 film

Wrigley Field, Los Angeles, California

- The Stratton Story, 1949 film (a few scenes)
- Armored Car Robbery, 1950 film (one scene)
- Angels in the Outfield, 1951 film (a few scenes)
- The Kid from Left Field, 1953 film (many scenes)
- Damn Yankees, 1958 film (primary setting – standing in for Griffith Stadium)
- The Geisha Boy, 1958 film
- Home Run Derby, 1959 TV series
- The Twilight Zone, 1960 episode "The Mighty Casey"

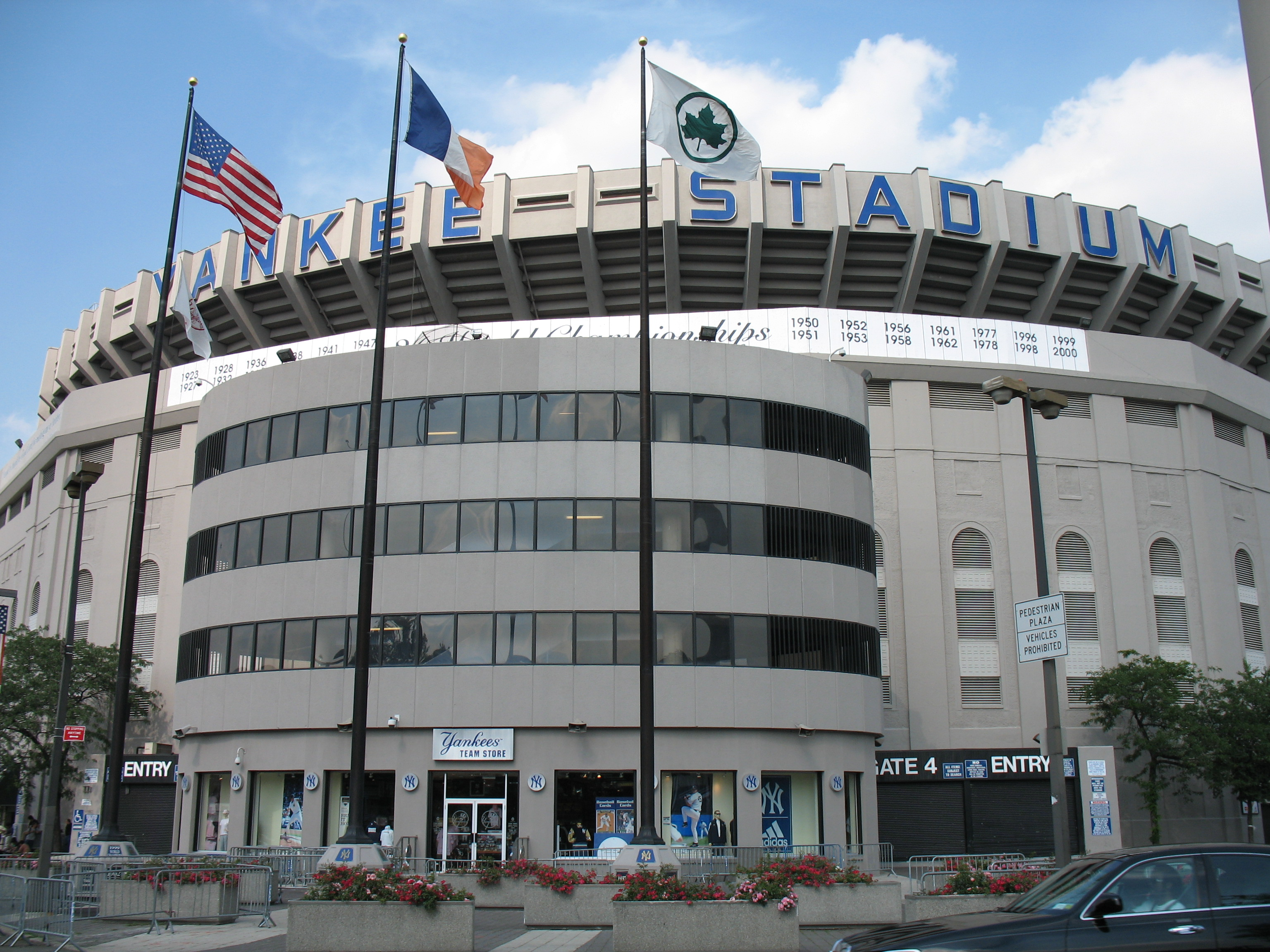

Yankee Stadium I, Bronx, New York

- The Pride of the Yankees, 1942 film (many scenes)
- Woman of the Year, 1942 film (one scene)
- Angels in the Outfield, 1951 film (setting for cameo by Joe DiMaggio)
- The FBI Story, 1959 film (Interior and exterior shots seen while FBI agents are keeping communist suspect under surveillance.)
- West Side Story, 1961 film (cameo – overhead shot during opening credits)
- Bang the Drum Slowly, 1973 film (several scenes standing in for Shea Stadium)
- It's My Turn, 1980 film (one scene set at Yankee Old-Timers Day on June 21, 1980)
- Variety, 1983 film (one scene set at Yankees-Red Sox game on October 1, 1982)
- Seinfeld, TV series, cameos in various episodes 1994–98 starting with "The Opposite" (George Costanza's workplace)
- For Love of the Game, 1999 film (many scenes)
- Anger Management, 2003 film (closing scene)

Yankee Stadium II, Bronx, New York

- The Adjustment Bureau, 2011 film (one scene)

Zephyr Field, Metairie, Louisiana

- Mr. 3000, 2004 film (several scenes)

== See also ==
- Lists of baseball parks
