= Dennis Haysbert =

American actor

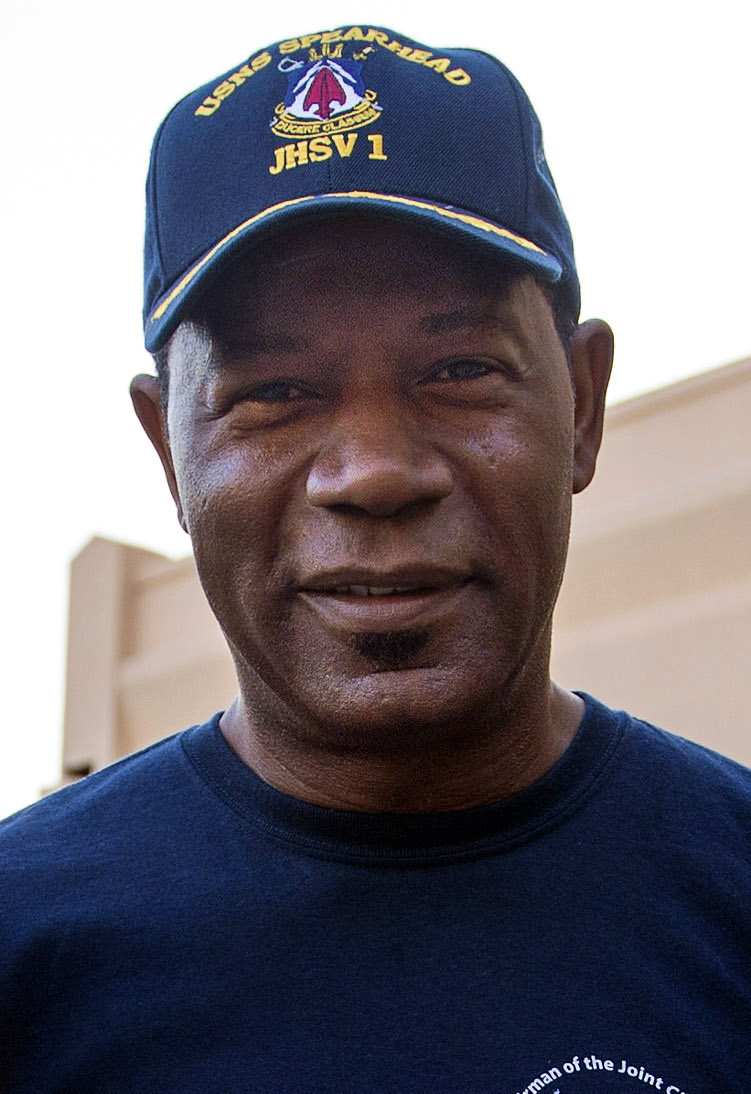
- Haysbert in 2015
- Born: Dennis Dexter Haysbert; June 2, 1954 (age 72); San Mateo, California, U.S.
- Occupation: Actor
- Years active: 1978–present
- Spouses: Elena Simms (m. 1980; div. 1984) Lynn Griffith (m. 1989; div. 2001)
- Children: 2

Dennis Dexter Haysbert (born June 2, 1954) is an American actor and voice actor. He is known for his roles as President David Palmer on the first five seasons of 24, baseball player Pedro Cerrano in the Major League film trilogy, Secret Service agent Tim Collin in the political thriller film Absolute Power, Sergeant Major Jonas Blane on the CBS military action drama series The Unit, and God on the Netflix show Lucifer. He has also appeared in the films Love Field, Navy SEALS, Heat, Waiting to Exhale, and Far from Heaven, as well as the science fiction series Incorporated. He is currently the narrator for the A&E Network's American Justice television series.

== Early life ==
Haysbert, who is of African American heritage, was born in San Mateo, California, the son of Gladys (née Minor), a homemaker and house cleaner, and Charles Whitney Haysbert Sr., a deputy sheriff and airline security guard. He is the eighth of nine children, having two sisters and six brothers. His parents were from Louisiana. Haysbert was raised Baptist.

Haysbert graduated from San Mateo High School in 1972. After high school, being 6 ft 5 in height, he was offered athletic scholarships but instead chose to study acting at the American Academy of Dramatic Arts.

== Career ==
=== Television ===
Haysbert has been acting in film and television since 1978, starting with a guest role in The White Shadow. His television guest starring roles include Lou Grant, Growing Pains, Laverne & Shirley, The A-Team, Night Court, Dallas, The Incredible Hulk, Magnum, P.I., Buck Rogers in the 25th Century, and Duckman. In 1993, he had a featured role in Return to Lonesome Dove as outlaw Cherokee Jack Jackson. In 1999, Haysbert starred with Eric Close in Now and Again, which was cancelled after one season.

In 2001, Haysbert rose to prominence when he was cast in 24 as U.S. Senator David Palmer, who served as the first black U.S. President (in the context of the show) during the second and third seasons. He also returned as a guest star in the last six episodes of season 4 and the first episode of season 5. He was nominated for a Golden Globe and for a Golden Satellite Award in 2002 for this role. Haysbert stated in an interview for the show that the three men he admires most—Jimmy Carter, Bill Clinton, and Colin Powell—collectively embody his idea of what a President should be. Haysbert believes that his playing of David Palmer on 24 helped Barack Obama—whom Haysbert supported—to win the 2008 Democratic presidential nomination.

Haysbert was the first actor to portray DC Comics character Kilowog, a member of the Green Lantern Corps, in a medium outside of comics. He provided the voice of Kilowog on various episodes of Justice League and Justice League Unlimited. On March 4, 2006, Haysbert guest-starred on the Saturday Night Live episode hosted by Natalie Portman as the host of a live-action/animated TV Funhouse cartoon called "Belated Black History Moment." In his role, Haysbert paid homage to fictional short-lived Saturday morning cartoons featuring black characters, such as Ladysmith Black Mambazo in Outer Space. He also portrayed Nelson Mandela in Goodbye Bafana (also released under the name The Color of Freedom). Haysbert portrayed the lead character Sergeant Major Jonas Blane in the CBS military action-drama The Unit. He hosted and narrated the Military History Channel presentation of Secrets of Pearl Harbor, which documented his scuba dives with a film team on World War II-era Japanese and American warships in the Pacific Theater. In March 2013, Haysbert narrated the documentary The World According to Dick Cheney on the Showtime television channel. On May 19, 2014, Haysbert also featured in the fifth episode of the fourth season of The Boondocks as Reverend Sturdy Harris. In 2015, Haysbert played Detective John Almond in Backstrom.

Since September 6, 2015, Haysbert's has been the opening voice introducing NBC's Meet the Press.

In November 2016, Haysbert began his co-starring role in Incorporated. Set in a dystopian future run by corporations, Haysbert plays Julian, a ruthless security head working for one of the larger corporations. Ben Affleck and Matt Damon are co-executive producers on the series, which was shot in British Columbia, Canada, and airs on Showcase in Canada and Syfy in the U.S.

He was also cast to play God for the second half of the fifth season of Lucifer.

On August 20, 2021, A&E announced that Haysbert would host a revival of American Justice, replacing longtime narrator Bill Kurtis.

In 2026, Haysbert had a reoccuring role in Season 4 of The Gilded Age, and was the voice of Master Eeko-Dio Daki in Star Wars: Maul – Shadow Lord.

=== Film ===
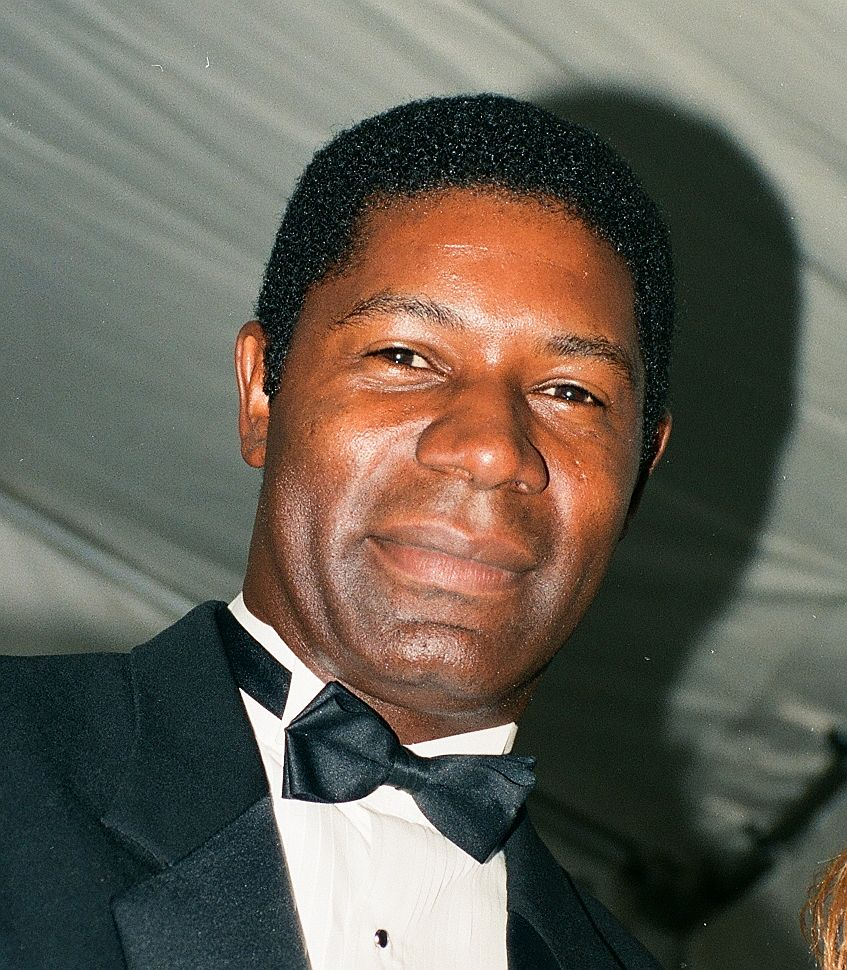
Haysbert in 1998

In 1989, Haysbert made his first major role as Pedro Cerrano, a voodoo-practicing Cuban refugee baseball player, in Major League. Haysbert followed that up with a role in 1990's Navy SEALs, which also starred Charlie Sheen and Michael Biehn, before moving on to another baseball film, Mr. Baseball with Tom Selleck. In 1991, he also starred in K-9000, where he played a police officer named Nick Sanrio. In 1992, he co-starred with Michelle Pfeiffer in Love Field, a film about a series of events occurring contemporaneously with the assassination and funeral of President John F. Kennedy. In 1994, Haysbert reprised his role as Cerrano in Major League II. This was followed by minor appearances in Waiting to Exhale, Heat, and Absolute Power. In 1998, Haysbert made another appearance as Cerrano in Major League: Back to the Minors. In 1999, Haysbert played a police detective in three films: The Minus Man, The Thirteenth Floor, and Random Hearts. In 2000, Haysbert played the role of Zeke McCall in Love & Basketball.

In 2002, Haysbert played the role of gardener Raymond Deagan in Far from Heaven. He won three awards (Satellite Award, Black Reel Award, and Washington DC Area Film Critics Association Award) for Best Supporting Actor for that role. In 2005, he had a supporting role in Sam Mendes's film, Jarhead. In 2007, Haysbert returned to the big screen to portray Nelson Mandela in Goodbye Bafana and an FBI agent in Breach. In 2012, he voiced General Hologram in Wreck-It Ralph and served as an official judge for the Noor Iranian Film Festival. He replaced the deceased Michael Clarke Duncan as Manute in Sin City: A Dame to Kill For (2014). In 2014, Haysbert played the role of Dean Fairbanks in Dear White People and General Lyons Dead Rising: Watchtower.

In December 2018, it was announced that Haysbert would star in the Netflix psychological thriller Secret Obsession. The film was released on July 18, 2019.

=== Commercials ===
Haysbert and Dean Winters are official spokesmen for the Allstate Insurance Company. Haysbert's commercials typically end with one of the two Allstate Corporation official slogans, either "Are you in good hands?" or "That's Allstate's stand." However, his commercials have combined the two with "That's Allstate's stand. Are you in good hands?" He has also appeared in Spanish-language commercials with the line "Con Allstate, Estás En Buenas Manos." (With Allstate, you're in good hands.) In his role as spokesman for Allstate, Haysbert officiated the coin toss prior to the 2007 Sugar Bowl between LSU and Notre Dame. Another Allstate commercial involves Haysbert arriving at a restaurant, followed by the staff saying "safe drivers save 40 percent".

In 2008, Haysbert was featured in national television ads to raise public awareness about lending discrimination. The ads were commissioned by the U.S. Department of Housing and Urban Development's Office of Fair Housing and Equal Opportunity. In one of these ads, Haysbert warns consumers about lenders' targeting minorities for inferior loan products.

For the 2006 college football season, Haysbert did voice work for ticket sales promotions for Brigham Young University. He did it as a favor to his younger brother Adam, who played wide receiver at BYU in the early 1980s.

Haysbert also voices the Military Channel's commercials with their official slogan: "The Military Channel. Go Behind the Lines."

=== Video games ===
Haysbert has also done voice work for various video games, such as Irving Lambert in Tom Clancy's Splinter Cell: Pandora Tomorrow, the narrator in Call of Duty: Finest Hour and reprising his television role of David Palmer in 24: The Game.

=== Theater ===
In June 2010, Haysbert joined the cast of David Mamet's Race on Broadway as character Henry Brown, performing alongside actors Eddie Izzard, Richard Thomas and Afton Williamson. The play ran until August 21, 2010.

== Personal life ==
Haysbert was married to Elena Simms from 1980 to 1984, and Lynn Griffith from 1989 to 2001. He has two children with Griffith.

Haysbert announced in April 2009 that he was starting a production company. His first project was to be a documentary for HBO about an up-and-coming boxer.

During the 2010 California elections, Haysbert supported Democratic incumbent Barbara Boxer by appearing with her at campaign events and recording radio commercials.

== Filmography ==
=== Film ===
Year	Title	Role	Notes
1979	Scoring	Lieutenant Harrigan	
1985	A Summer to Remember	Sheriff Pierce	
1989	Major League	Pedro Cerrano	
1990	Navy SEALs	Chief Special Warfare Operator Billy Graham	
1992	Mr. Baseball	Max "Hammer" Dubois	
1992	Love Field	Paul Cater	
1993	Suture	Clay Arlington	
1994	Major League II	Pedro Cerrano	
1995	Heat	Don Breedan	
1995	Waiting to Exhale	Kenneth Dawkins	
1996	Amanda	Seven / Sir Jordan	
1997	Absolute Power	Tim Collin	
1998	How to Make the Cruelest Month	Manhattan Parks	
1998	Major League: Back to the Minors	Pedro Cerrano	
1998	Standoff	FBI Agent Ty "Bama" Jones	
1999	The Minus Man	Detective Graves	
1999	The Thirteenth Floor	Detective Larry McBain	
1999	Random Hearts	Detective George Beaufort	
2000	What's Cooking?	Ronald Williams	
2000	Love & Basketball	Zeke McCall	
2002	Ticker	FBI Agent	Segment from the BMW short film series The Hire
2002	Far from Heaven	Raymond Deagan	Satellite Award for Best Supporting Actor - Motion Picture; Washington D.C. Area Film Critics Association Award for Best Supporting Actor; Nominated — Chlotrudis Award for Best Supporting Actor
2003	Sinbad: Legend of the Seven Seas	Kale	Voice
2005	Jarhead	Major Lincoln	
2007	Goodbye Bafana	Nelson Mandela	
2007	Breach	Dean Plesac	
2011	The Details	Lincoln	
2011	Kung Fu Panda 2	Master Storming Ox	Voice
2011	Field of Dreams 2: Lockout	Mann	Short film
2011	Kung Fu Panda: Secrets of the Masters	Master Storming Ox	Voice
2012	LUV	Mr. Fish	
2012	Wreck-It Ralph	General Hologram	Voice Cameo
2013	Welcome to the Jungle	Mr. Crawford	
2013	The Black Moses	Sir Lynden O. Pindling	
2014	Mr. Peabody & Sherman	Judge	Voice Cameo
2014	Think Like a Man Too	Uncle Eddie	
2014	Life of a King	Searcy	
2014	Sin City: A Dame to Kill For	Manute	
2014	Men, Women & Children	Secretluvur	
2014	Sniper: Legacy	Colonel Gabriel Stone	Direct-to-video
2014	Dear White People	The Dean	
2015	Experimenter	Ossie Davis	
2015	Dead Rising: Watchtower	General Lyons	Digital film
2015	Ted 2	Fertility Doctor	Cameo
2016	Jarhead 3: The Siege	Major Lincoln	Direct-to-video
2016	Dead Rising: Endgame	General Lyons	Digital film
2016	Sniper: Ghost Shooter	Colonel Gabriel Stone	Direct-to-video
2017	Fist Fight	Superintendent Johnson	
2017	The Dark Tower	Steven Deschain	
2017	Naked	Reginald Swope	
2017	Kodachrome	Larry Boldt	
2019	Breakthrough	Dr. Garrett	
2019	Secret Obsession	Detective Frank Page	
2019	Playing with Fire	Commander Richards	
2022	No Exit	Ed	
2022	Chip 'n Dale: Rescue Rangers	Zipper	Voice
2022	Sniper: Rogue Mission	Colonel Gabriel Stone	Direct-to-video
2023	Flamin' Hot	Clarence C. Baker	
2023	Sniper: G.R.I.T. – Global Response & Intelligence Team	Colonel Gabriel Stone	Direct-to-video
2024	Summer Camp	Tommy	
2024	Lost & Found in Cleveland	Marty Anderson	
2024	In Fidelity	Hoyt Johnston	
2025	Time of Death	Officer Dale Aarons	
2026	Send Help	Franklin	
2026	Relationship Goals	Papa Jim	
TBA	Silent Retreat †	TBA	Post-production

=== Television ===
Year	Title	Role	Notes
1978	Lou Grant	Victor	Episode: "Schools"
1979	The White Shadow	Basketball Player	Episode: "Wanna Bet?"
1979	Laverne & Shirley	Navy Shore Patrolman	Episode: "What Do You Do with a Drunken Sailor?"
1980	Quincy M.E.	Fred	Episode: "New Blood"
1980	The Incredible Hulk	Guard	Episode: "Nine Hours"
1980	Galactica 1980	Colonial Warrior	Episode: "Space Croppers" (Miscredited as "The Creature")
1980–1981	Buck Rogers in the 25th Century	Various Roles	5 episodes
1981	Quincy M.E.	Driver	Episode: "Headhunter"
1981	Grambling's White Tiger	James "Shack" Harris	Television film
1981–1982	Code Red	"Stuff" Wade	8 episodes
1983	The A-Team	Psych Ward Staff	Episode: "One More Time"
1983	The Yellow Rose	Military Police Officer	Episode: "Trail's End"
1984	Dallas	Dr. Forbes	Episode: "Killer at Large"
1984	Riptide	Odell	Episode: "Father's Day"
1984	Gimme a Break!	Reverend Winfield	Episode: "Baby of the Family"
1984–1985	Off the Rack	Cletus Maxwell	7 episodes
1985	Magnum P.I.	Lieutenant Jameson, USN	Episode: "Blood and Honor"
1985	What's Happening Now!!	Policeman	Episode: "I'll Be Homeless for Christmas"
1985	Growing Pains	Police Officer	Episode: "Weekend Fantasy"
1986	The Fall Guy	Jeremy Wolf	Episode: "Trial by Fire"
1986	227	Sergeant Hall	Episode: "Redecorating Blues"
1986	Scarecrow and Mrs. King	Kimambo	Episode: "Billy's Lost Weekend"
1986	The Young and the Restless	Ron Clark	8 episodes
1987	Growing Pains	Officer Wright	Episode: "Gone But Not Forgotten"
1987	Knots Landing	Police Officer	Episode: "The Unraveling"
1987	Easy Street	Chip	Episode: "The Country Club"
1987	Valerie	Dr. Ervin	Episode: "Oedipus Wrecks"
1987	Our House	Unknown Role	Episode: "Sounds from a Silent Clock: Part 2"
1987	The Facts of Life	Sergeant Evans	Episode: "Before the Fall"
1988	Growing Pains	Frank	Episode: "State of the Union"
1988	Out of This World	Reverend Williams	Episode: "a.k.a. Dad"
1988	Crime Story	Franklin Himes	2 episodes
1988–1989	Just the Ten of Us	Coach Duane Johnson	9 episodes
1989	Night Court	James Morgan	Episode: "Pen Pal"
1989	The Robert Guillaume Show	Mr. Peterson	Episode: "Guaranteed Not to Shrink"
1991	K-9000	Nick Sanrio	Television film
1993	Alex Haley's Queen	Davis	Television film
1993	Return to Lonesome Dove	Jack Jackson	3 episodes
1993	American Playhouse	Reverend Oliver Crawford	Episode: "Hallelujah"
1998	The New Batman Adventures	Barkley James	Voice, episode: "Mean Seasons"
1998–1999	Superman: The Animated Series	Agent #1 / Doctor #1	Voice, 2 episodes
1999	Godzilla: The Series	General Ekwensi	Voice, episode: "Monster Wars Part 1"
1999–2000	Now and Again	Dr. Theodore Morris	22 episodes Saturn Award for Best Supporting Actor on Television; Nominated — Satellite Award for Best Actor – Television Series Drama
2001	Soul Food	Rick Grant	2 episodes
2001	The Outer Limits	Joshua Finch	Episode: "Rule of Law"
2001–2006	24	David Palmer	81 episodes Nominated — Golden Globe Award for Best Supporting Actor - Series, Miniseries or Television Film; Nominated — Satellite Award for Best Supporting Actor - Television Series; Nominated — NAACP Image Award for Outstanding Actor in a Drama Series (2003, 2004); Nominated — NAACP Image Award for Outstanding Supporting Actor in a Drama Series; Nominated — Screen Actors Guild Award for Outstanding Performance by an Ensemble in a Drama Series (2003, 2005)
2001–2003	Static Shock	Chief Barnsdale	Voice, 4 episodes
2001–2004	Justice League	Kilowog	Voice, 4 episodes
2006–2009	The Unit	Sergeant Major Jonas Blane	69 episodes Nominated — NAACP Image Award for Outstanding Actor in a Drama Series (2007–2009)
2013	Newsreaders	Detective Fenster Landau	Episode: "CCSI: Boston"
2013	Axe Cop	Frog	Voice, episode: "Super Axe"
2013–2014	Trophy Wife	Russ Bradley Morrison	2 episodes
2014	The Boondocks	Sturdy Harris	Voice, episode: "Freedom Ride or Die"
2014	How Murray Saved Christmas	The Narrator	Television special
2015	Blue Bloods	Deputy Chief Donald Kent	Episode: "New Rules"
2015	Backstrom	Detective Almond	13 episodes
2016	The Grinder	Special Agent	Episode: "Delusions of Grinder"
2016	Brooklyn Nine-Nine	Bob Annderson	2 episodes
2016	Undercover	Rudy Jones	5 episodes
2016–2017	Incorporated	Julian	Recurring
2017	Shots Fired	Mr. Terry	Episode: "Hour Two: Betrayal of Trust"; uncredited
2018	Reverie	Charlie Ventana	Recurring
2019–2021	Puppy Dog Pals	Crash	Voice; 2 episodes
2019	Surveillance	Barry Wilkinson	Television film
2020	Home Movie: The Princess Bride	Prince Humperdinck	Episode: "Chapter Eight: Ultimate Suffering"
2020–2021	Lucifer	God	5 episodes
2021	Masters of the Universe: Revelation	King Grayskull	Voice, episode: "The Forge at the Forest of Forever"
2021–present	American Justice	The Narrator	23 episodes
2023	Paul T. Goldman	Agent Portman	3 episodes
2026	Star Wars: Maul – Shadow Lord	Master Eeko-Dio Daki	Voice; 10 episodes
2026	The Gilded Age	Dr. Reginald Harris	Episode: "Jumping the Broom"

=== Video games ===
Year	Title	Role	Notes
2004	Tom Clancy's Splinter Cell: Pandora Tomorrow	Irving Lambert	
2004	Call of Duty: Finest Hour	The Narrator	
2006	24: The Game	David Palmer	

=== Theatre ===
Year	Title	Role	Notes
2010	Race	Henry Brown	
