= Love Accidentally =

2022 film by Peter Sullivan

- Official release poster
- Directed by: Peter Sullivan
- Written by: Robert Dean Klein
- Produced by: Brenda Song
- Starring: Brenda Song; Aaron O'Connell; Denise Richards
- Cinematography: Joseph M. Setele
- Edited by: Randy Carter
- Music by: Matthew Janszen
- Production companies: Hybrid; Wholesome Movies
- Distributed by: Amazon Freevee
- Release date: July 15, 2022
- Running time: 85 minutes
- Country: United States
- Language: English

Love Accidentally is a 2022 American romantic comedy film written by Robert Dean Klein, directed by Peter Sullivan, and starring Brenda Song and Aaron O'Connell. It was released on Amazon Freevee on July 15, 2022.

The film received a generally negative response from critics.

== Plot ==
Alexa and Jason are in the midst of a competition for the same promotion at their advertising firm, when each of their significant others breaks up with them. After Alexa accidentally sends Jason a brokenhearted text message, they start up an anonymous relationship through text and voice messages, unaware of who the other actually is.

== Cast ==
- Brenda Song as Alexa
- Aaron O'Connell as Jason
- Denise Richards as Debra
- Maxwell Caulfield as Craig
- Brooke Newton as Hannah
- Pedro Correa as Brad
- Gib Gerard as Perry
- Marc Anthony Samuel as Trey

== Production ==
On April 13, 2022, it was announced that the film will be the first original movie released by Amazon Freevee, and that it would star Brenda Song, Aaron O'Connell, Denise Richards, and Maxwell Caulfield.

== Release ==
The film was released on Amazon Freevee on July 15, 2022.

== Reception ==
On Rotten Tomatoes, the film holds an approval rating of 13% based on 8 reviews, with an average rating of 4/10. Radhika Menon of Decider wrote, "It's cheesy, which isn't a fault on its own, but doesn't back itself up with the heart it thinks it's delivering", concluding that "the film under-uses Brenda Song." Ferdosa Abdi of Screen Rant rated it 1.5 stars out of 5, calling it "a flimsy story with poor chemistry."
