= Ashley Scott =

American actress (born 1977)

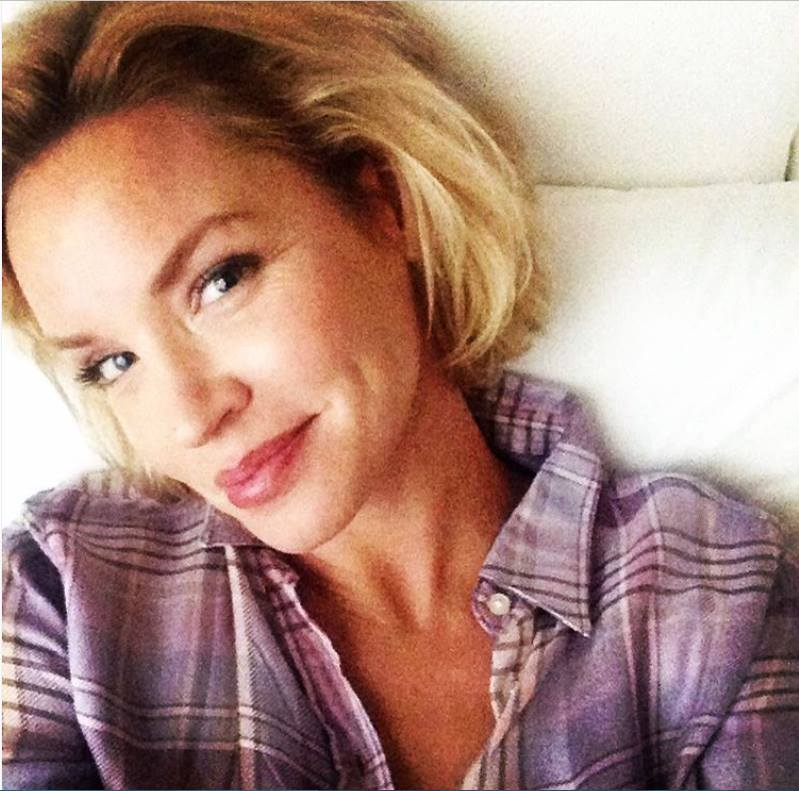
- Born: July 13, 1977 (age 49); Metairie, Louisiana, U.S.
- Occupations: Actress, model
- Years active: 2001–present
- Height: 171.5 cm (5 ft 8 in)
- Spouse: Anthony Rhulen (m. 2004; div. 2008)
- Children: 2

Ashley McCall Scott (born July 13, 1977) is an American actress and model, best known for providing the voice and motion capture for Maria Miller in the video games The Last of Us (2013) and The Last of Us Part II (2020). She has also appeared in films such as A.I. Artificial Intelligence (2001), Walking Tall (2004), Into the Blue (2005), The Kingdom (2007), 12 Rounds (2009), and Secret Obsession (2019), as well as a number of television movies on the Lifetime network since 2010. Her television roles include the genre series Jericho, Birds of Prey, and Dark Angel.

== Early life ==
Ashley Scott was born outside New Orleans in Metairie, Louisiana, on July 13, 1977, growing up in Charleston, South Carolina. She began her modeling career as a young girl and was a 1993 Elite Model Look finalist. As a teenager, she became a model for Elite Miami. She modeled internationally in fashion shows in Miami, Paris, and London, and has modeled for photos on the cover of numerous publications.

== Career ==
Scott's first screen credit was as Gigolo Jane in the 2001 feature film A.I. Artificial Intelligence. While Scott has had supporting roles and bit parts in a number of feature films – including Walking Tall (2004), Into the Blue (2005), The Kingdom (2007), and 12 Rounds (2009) – she has had a number of lead and recurring roles on television.

In 2001, she was cast as series regular Asha Barlow on the Fox science fiction series Dark Angel. In 2002, Scott was cast as Helena Kyle / Huntress on the WB television drama series Birds of Prey.

In 2004, she played the role of Allison on Joey in the unbroadcast pilot, and was replaced by Andrea Anders for the series.

She starred as Emily Sullivan for both seasons of the CBS series Jericho (2006—2009). She was also cast as series regular Mary in the first season (2015) of the Lifetime network's comedy-drama series UnREAL.

In 2013, she voiced the character Maria in the video game The Last of Us. She reprised her role in the 2020 sequel The Last of Us Part II. She had originally auditioned for the role of Tess before it went to Annie Wersching.

In 2019, Scott starred in the Netflix psychological thriller Secret Obsession, which was digitally released worldwide on July 18, 2019. In the same year, it was reported that Scott would reprise her role as Helena Kyle/Huntress in the Arrowverse crossover "Crisis on Infinite Earths". Scott appeared in a scene of Jumanji: The Next Level, although it was cut from the finished film.

== Personal life ==
Scott was married to producer Anthony Rhulen from 2004 to 2008, then to the singer Steve Hart (member of the band Worlds Apart). In 2010, her daughter Ada Bella Ray Hart was born, followed by her second daughter, Iyla Vue Hart, in 2015. She resides in Los Angeles with her two daughters.

== Filmography ==
=== Film ===
Year	Title	Role	Notes
2001	A.I. Artificial Intelligence	Gigolo Jane	
2003	S.W.A.T.	Lara	
2004	Walking Tall	Deni	
2004	Evil Remains	Sharon	
2004	Lost	Judy	
2005	Into the Blue	Amanda	
2005	Just Friends	Janice	
2006	Puff, Puff, Pass	Elise	direct-to-video
2007	The Kingdom	Janine Ripon	
2008	Strange Wilderness	Cheryl	
2009	12 Rounds	Molly Porter	
2010	Christmas Mail	Kristi North	
2019	Secret Obsession	Nurse Masters	
2019	Jumanji: The Next Level	Ashley	deleted scene

=== Television ===
Year	Title	Role	Notes
2001–2002	Dark Angel	Asha Barlow	Main role (season 2)
2002–2003	Birds of Prey	Helena Kyle / Huntress	Main role
2004	Joey	Allison	unaired pilot
2006	Deceit	Sam Pruitt	Television film
2006–2008	Jericho	Emily Sullivan	Main role
2009	Fear Itself	Lisa	Episode: "The Circle"
2009	CSI: Miami	Zoe Belle	Episode: "Target Specific"
2010	NCIS	Dana Hutton	Episode: "Obsession"
2010	Christmas Mail	Kristi North	Television film
2012	Unstable	Christine March	Television film
2013	The Perfect Boyfriend	April	Television film
2013	Summoned	Laura Price	Television film
2013	The Nightmare Nanny	Annie	Television film
2013	Holiday Road Trip	Maya	Television film
2015	16 and Missing	Julia	Television film
2015	UnREAL	Mary Newhouse	Main role (season 1)
2016	Broken Promise	Mina Gardner	Television film
2016	A Killer Walks Amongst Us	Hathaway	Television film
2017	Fatal Defense	Arden Walsh	Television film
2017	A Woman Deceived	Elizabeth	Television film
2017	Manny Dearest	Karen Clark	Television film
2017	One Small Discretion	Caroline	Television film
2018	A Tale of Two Coreys	Sheila Feldman	Television film
2019	The Flash	Helena Kyle / Huntress	Episode: “Crisis on Infinite Earths: Part Three”

=== Video games ===
Year	Title	Role	Notes
2013	The Last of Us	Maria (voice)	also motion capture
2020	The Last of Us Part II	Maria (voice)	also motion capture
