= Summoned (film) =

2013 American television film

- Screenplay by: Peter Sullivan
- Directed by: Peter Sullivan
- Starring: Cuba Gooding Jr. Ashley Scott; Bailey Chase
- Theme music composer: Matthew Janszen
- Country of origin: United States
- Original language: English

Production
- Cinematography: Roberto Schein
- Editor: Randy Carter
- Running time: 72 minutes
- Production companies: Hybrid; Lancom Entertainment; Production Media Group

Original release
- Release: July 26, 2013

Summoned is a 2013 American television film written and directed by Peter Sullivan and starring Cuba Gooding Jr., Ashley Scott and Bailey Chase.

== Cast ==
- Cuba Gooding Jr. as Detective Callendar
- Ashley Scott as Laura Price
- Bailey Chase as Detective Michael Lyons
- James Hong as Frank
- Tichina Arnold as Mylene
- Tim Abell as George Harris
