= Secret Obsession =

American psychological thriller film

- Promotional poster
- Directed by: Peter Sullivan
- Written by: Kraig Wenman; Peter Sullivan
- Produced by: Jeffrey Schenck; Barry Barnholtz; Peter Sullivan; Brian Nolan
- Starring: Brenda Song; Mike Vogel; Dennis Haysbert; Ashley Scott
- Cinematography: Eitan Almagor
- Edited by: Randy Carter
- Music by: Jim Dooley
- Production company: Hybrid Films
- Distributed by: Netflix
- Release date: July 18, 2019
- Running time: 97 minutes
- Country: United States
- Language: English

Secret Obsession is a 2019 American psychological thriller film directed by Peter Sullivan, who co-wrote the screenplay with Kraig Wenman. It stars Brenda Song, Mike Vogel, Dennis Haysbert, and Ashley Scott.

It was released on July 18, 2019, by Netflix.

== Plot ==
On a rainy night, a woman flees down the street from an unknown pursuer. She is struck by a car, leaving her injured and unconscious. She wakes up in the hospital with amnesia, recalling nothing about the incident or her life prior.

A man by her bedside introduces himself as Russell Williams, her husband, and says that her name is Jennifer. To help her regain memories, he shows her photos of her life, telling her that her parents died in a fire two years ago, that she had quit her job, and that she rarely talks to her friends anymore.

Detective Frank Page, obsessed with his work after failing to find his own daughter's kidnapper, investigates Jennifer's accident. He grows suspicious of Russell, who drives a truck similar to one seen in the vicinity where Jennifer was hit. After she is discharged, Russell takes her to their secluded home.

Jennifer is haunted by brief flashes of memories from the rainy night of her accident. She becomes uneasy by Russell's strange behavior and realizes that he has been locking her inside the house at night. She also notices that most of the photos in her home have been manipulated.

Frank's investigation leads him to Jennifer's parents' home, where he finds their rotting corpses. He learns from Jennifer's former employer that "Russell" is actually Ryan Gaerity, a temperamental worker fired over two months ago.

While Ryan is out, Jennifer finds her own ID in his wallet, which she uses to unlock his computer. She finds images of her actual husband Russell and realizes the danger she is in. Before Jennifer can escape, Ryan knocks her unconscious and chains her to the bed while he goes out to get supplies. When he returns, the real Russell's corpse is revealed to be in his car trunk.

Frank arrives at their home and tries to rescue Jennifer, but Ryan knocks him out, locking him in a freezer. He rants to Jennifer that he had loved her for years but her lack of reciprocation and marriage to Russell enraged him, leading him to kill Russell and take Jennifer for himself.

Jennifer manages to escape into the forest with Ryan giving chase. Knowing that she will never love him, he decides to kill her with his gun. However, as Frank has freed himself, he tackles him before he can shoot her. Then, Jennifer takes the gun and shoots Ryan in the arm. Wounded, he desperately attempts to run towards her to retrieve the gun, but Jennifer fires another shot, ultimately killing Ryan.

Three months later, Frank gives Jennifer a note from her late husband that he had found during the investigation. As she drives, leaving for San Jose, Russell's voice narrates the note, telling her how much he loves her "Forever and a day".

== Cast ==
- Brenda Song as Jennifer Allen Williams
- Mike Vogel as Ryan Gaerity / the fake Russell Williams
- Dennis Haysbert as Detective Frank Page
- Ashley Scott as Nurse Masters
- Paul Sloan as Jim Kahn
- Daniel Booko as the real Russell Williams
- Scott Peat as Ray
- Blair Hickey as Scott
- Michael Patrick McGill as Captain Fitzpatrick
- Casey Leach as Charlie Kimble
- Jim Hanna as Dr. East
- Ciarra Carter as Desk Nurse
- Eric Etebari as Xander
- Kati Salowsky as Cashier
- Jennifer Peo as Mother

== Production ==
Principal photography for the film took place on location in Pomona and Malibu, California, in 2018.

== Release ==
The film was released on July 18, 2019, by Netflix. On October 17, 2019, Netflix announced that the film had been viewed by over 40 million viewers after its release on their platform.

== Reception ==
On Rotten Tomatoes, the film holds an approval rating of 29% based on 17 reviews, with an average of 2.8/10. The website's critical consensus reads: "While it may offer some thrills and unintentional laughs, Secret Obsession is mostly a formulaic and dumb thriller."

NPR's Linda Holmes wrote in a satirical review, "This is a pretty bad movie, but it seems to be bad in the way it's meant to be bad. It's cheerfully trashy, and if that's up your alley, have at it."
