= Peter Sullivan (screenwriter) =

American screenwriter, film director, and film producer

- Born: November 30, 1976 (age 49); Shrewsbury, Massachusetts, U.S.
- Education: New York University
- Occupations: Screenwriter, director

Peter Sullivan (born November 30, 1976) is an American screenwriter, film director, and film producer. He has more than 150 producing credits and directed more than 40 movies, most of them made-for-television.

== Life and career ==
Peter Sullivan was born in Shrewsbury, Massachusetts and graduated from New York University's Tisch School of the Arts with a degree in Film and Television.

He directed the Hallmark original film Christmas Under Wraps, which became the highest-rated telecast in Hallmark Channel history and the second highest rated cable movie in 2014. His other directing credits include Dear Secret Santa, The Dog Who Saved Halloween, the short Stephen King Night Surf, and the comedy web-series Everyone Counts, about the 2010 Census featuring French Stewart. In the summer of 2007, he directed a series of behind-the-scenes segments for the web-series In the Motherhood.

In 2018, Sullivan directed the Netflix psychological thriller Secret Obsession, which was released on July 18, 2019. The following year he directed and co-wrote the Netflix psychological thriller Fatal Affair. The film was released on July 16, 2020.

His writing credits include Abandoned, His and Her Christmas, Poison Ivy 4: The Secret Society, The Perfect Student, Blind Injustice, and Hydra.

In 2008, Sullivan became vice-president of producer Jeffrey Schenck's production company ARO Entertainment. His credits include: The Dog Who Saved Christmas and its sequels The Dog Who Saved Christmas Vacation and The Dog Who Saved the Holidays.

In addition to his film work, Sullivan has written for the internet site Latino Review, and he has also co-written the horror graphic novel Burning Man with comic book author Stephen Stern and Kenneth Ceballos.

== Hearing loss ==
Sullivan was diagnosed with a severe hearing loss as a child. With the assistance of hearing aids, he speaks and read lips fluently. He often expresses his personal challenges and journey in his work. Speaking to CineMovie about his film Cucuy: The Boogeyman, Sullivan explained:

"Amelia is hearing impaired and I'm hearing impaired. It was based on me... because I knew how it felt basically growing up and being teased and experiencing a lot of what she experiences. And I wanted to take that same theme and apply it to several of the characters that all sort of feel like outsiders in their own way."

== Directing credits ==
- The Good Man's Sin (1999) Short
- Night Surf (2002)
- Into the Maelstrom (2005)
- Game Over (2005)
- The Dog Who Saved Halloween (2011)
- 12 Wishes of Christmas (2012)
- All About Christmas Eve (2012)
- Christmas Twister (2012)
- Summoned (2013)
- Hidden Away (2013)
- Dear Secret Santa (2013)
- High School Possession (2014)
- Christmas Under Wraps (2014)
- A Christmas Mystery (2014)
- Kidnapped: The Hannah Anderson Story (2015)
- Ominous (2015)
- 12 Gifts of Christmas (2015)
- The Flight Before Christmas (2015)
- His Double Life (2016)
- My Summer Prince (2016)
- Broadcasting Christmas (2016)
- The Sandman (2017)
- Wrapped Up In Christmas (2017)
- Sharing Christmas (2017)
- Cucuy: The Boogeyman (2017)
- My Christmas Inn (2018)
- Jingle Belle (2018)
- Secret Obsession (2019)
- The Secret Lives of Cheerleaders (2019)
- The Road Home for Christmas (2019)
- Fatal Affair (2020)
- The Christmas Edition (2020)
- Love Accidentally (2022)
- A Cozy Christmas Inn (2022)
- The Case of the Christmas Diamond (2022)
- A Prince and Pauper Christmas (2022)
- A Nurse to Die For (2023)
- Trapped in the Farmhouse (2023)
- To Kill a Stepfather (2023)
- Secrets in the Desert (2023)
- Break In (2023)
- Silent Night, Fatal Night (2023)
- Killer Fortune Teller (2023)
- The Merry Gentlemen (2024)
