= Major League: Back to the Minors =

- Theatrical release poster
- Directed by: John Warren
- Written by: John Warren
- Based on: Characters by David S. Ward
- Produced by: James G. Robinson
- Starring: Scott Bakula; Corbin Bernsen; Dennis Haysbert; Takaaki Ishibashi; Jensen Daggett; Eric Bruskotter; Ted McGinley; Bob Uecker
- Cinematography: Tim Suhrstedt
- Edited by: O. Nicholas Brown; Bryan H. Carroll
- Music by: Robert Folk
- Production company: Morgan Creek Productions
- Distributed by: Warner Bros.
- Release date: April 17, 1998
- Running time: 100 minutes
- Country: United States
- Language: English
- Budget: $18 million
- Box office: $3.5 million

Major League: Back to the Minors is a 1998 American sports comedy film written and directed by John Warren. It is the third installment in the Major League film series (following 1989's Major League and 1994's Major League II) and is considered a standalone sequel. The film stars Scott Bakula, Corbin Bernsen, Dennis Haysbert, Takaaki Ishibashi, Jensen Daggett, Eric Bruskotter, Ted McGinley and Bob Uecker.

Major League: Back to the Minors was released by Warner Bros. on April 17, 1998. The film received negative reviews from critics and was a box office bomb, grossing $3.5 million against an $18 million budget.

== Plot ==
Aging minor league pitcher Gus Cantrell, who plays for the Fort Myers Miracle, is ejected from the game following the "frozen ball trick". Roger Dorn, now the owner of the Minnesota Twins, recruits Gus to be the manager of the Buzz, the Twins' AAA minor league affiliate. Gus's mission is to make a real team out of a bunch of players who include ballet dancer turned ballplayer Lance "The Dance" Pere, minor league lifer Frank "Pops" Morgan, Rube Baker, Taka Tanaka, Pedro Cerrano, pitcher Hog Ellis, home run hitter Billy "Downtown" Anderson, and pitcher Carlton "Doc" Windgate, who throws the slowest fastball in the minors and also acts as the team psychologist.

However, Gus clashes with Leonard Huff, the snobby manager of the Twins. One night in Minnesota, Gus and his fiancée Maggie Reynolds are having dinner with Roger and Huff at an upscale restaurant, where Huff challenges Gus to a game between the Buzz and the Twins. Gus accepts the challenge.

The game is scheduled to take place at the Hubert H. Humphrey Metrodome in Minnesota. The Twins take a 3–0 lead in the 6th inning, but Downtown hits a home run that ties the game at 3–3 in the 8th inning. But with two outs in the bottom of the 9th inning, and with Doc one strike away from striking out home run hitter Carlos Liston, Huff has the stadium's lights turned off so the game can end with a tie rather than give the Buzz a chance to win in extra innings. However, the media reports that the Twins were still outplayed by the Buzz.

Huff now wants to bring Downtown up to the Twins, even though Gus believes that he is not yet ready. Downtown jumps on the opportunity, turning his back on Gus. Without Downtown, the Buzz start losing again. With the Twins, Downtown starts hitting poorly, proving Huff wrong. Gus manages to get the Buzz back on track, and Downtown is sent back down to the Buzz, where Gus teaches him how to be a more well rounded hitter. Gus leads the Buzz to a division title in their league.

After hearing Huff insulting Downtown for his failed stint with the Twins, Gus issues a challenge for Huff to bring the Twins to Buzz Stadium for another game. If the Twins win, Gus will give his salary for the year to Huff. If Gus and the Buzz beat the Twins, Gus can take over as the manager of the Twins. Huff accepts the challenge and takes the Twins to play against the Buzz. This time, the Twins take a 4–0 lead in the 6th inning, but the Buzz still manage to come from behind and win the game, 5–4, thanks to a two-run home run by Downtown. Gus decides that he wants to stay with the Buzz so he can continue to work with minor league players on their skills and hopefully turn them into stars.

== Cast ==
- Corbin Bernsen as Roger Dorn
- Scott Bakula as Gus Cantrell
- Bob Uecker as Harry Doyle
- Kenny Johnson as Lance "The Dance" Pere
- Thom Barry as Frank "Pops" Morgan
- Eric Bruskotter as Rube Baker
- Takaaki Ishibashi as Taka Tanaka
- Dennis Haysbert as Pedro Cerrano
- Judson Mills as Hog Ellis
- Walton Goggins as Billy "Downtown" Anderson
- Peter Mackenzie as Carlton "Doc" Windgate
- Ted McGinley as Leonard Huff
- Jensen Daggett as Maggie Reynolds
- Steve Yeager as Duke Temple
- Lobo Sebastian as Carlos Liston

== Reception ==
=== Box office ===
The film flopped at the box office, grossing only $3.6 million in ticket sales against a budget of $18 million.

=== Critical response ===
On the review aggregator website Rotten Tomatoes, 22% of 18 critics' reviews are positive, with an average rating of 3.5/10. Audiences polled by CinemaScore gave the film an average grade of "B-" on an A+ to F scale.

== Possible sequel ==
David S. Ward, the writer and producer of the original Major League, announced in 2010 that he was working on a new film, which he calls Major League 3, which instead acts as a proper sequel to the second film and hoped to cast the original stars Charlie Sheen, Wesley Snipes and Tom Berenger. The plot would have seen Sheen's character Ricky "Wild Thing" Vaughn coming out of retirement to work with a young player. In 2017, Sheen expressed interest in doing the sequel.

== See also ==
- List of baseball films
