= 12 Rounds (film) =

2009 film by Renny Harlin

- Theatrical release poster
- Directed by: Renny Harlin
- Written by: Daniel Kunka
- Produced by: Mark Gordon; Josh McLaughlin; Michael Lake
- Starring: John Cena; Aidan Gillen; Ashley Scott; Steve Harris; Brian J. White
- Cinematography: David Boyd
- Edited by: Brian Berdan
- Music by: Trevor Rabin
- Production companies: WWE Studios; Fox Atomic; The Mark Gordon Company
- Distributed by: 20th Century Fox
- Release dates: March 19, 2009 (Australia); March 27, 2009 (United States)
- Running time: 109 minutes
- Country: United States
- Language: English
- Budget: $20 million
- Box office: $17.3 million

12 Rounds is a 2009 American action film directed by Renny Harlin and produced by WWE Studios. The cast is led by John Cena, alongside Aidan Gillen, Steve Harris, Gonzalo Menendez, Brian J. White, Ashley Scott and Taylor Cole. The film was released to theaters in the United States on March 27, 2009. It follows a detective who is forced to complete a 12-round challenge in exchange for his kidnapped girlfriend's life. The film received generally negative reviews.

== Plot ==
International arms dealer and terrorist Miles Jackson is on the run in New Orleans from the FBI, led by agents George Aiken and Ray Santiago. Concurrently, police officer Danny Fisher and his partner Hank Carver are riding around the city when they also become involved with the investigation. Fisher tracks and eventually confronts Jackson and his girlfriend/accomplice Erica, but she is accidentally killed in the process.

A year later, now Detective Fisher receives a cellphone call from Jackson, who has escaped from prison and has kidnapped Fisher's girlfriend Molly Porter to avenge Erica's untimely death. Jackson convinces Fisher to participate in a series of 12 challenges across the city if he wants to save her, starting with remotely detonating Fisher's car and residence.

Fisher races against time to narrowly complete the challenges, including a free-falling elevator, a runaway trolley, and a bomb strapped to Molly's chest, finding the clues necessary for the next challenge with the assistance of Aiken and Santiago. They attempt to trace Jackson's number but Jackson ends the calls prematurely and replaces his SIM cards to destroy his trails. Meanwhile, Hank deduces that Anthony Deluso, a paroled suspect, was involved in the same prison break as Jackson. Hank inadvertently becomes part of a challenge and dies.

By round 12, Fisher, Aiken and Santiago realize that the challenges and revenge plot were simply elaborate distractions, allowing Jackson time to infiltrate and rob a United States Minting facility. Jackson siphons the money via firetruck and takes Molly hostage in a private helicopter but Fisher is able to jump aboard before it departs. Fisher incapacitates Jackson, but not before the latter disables the helicopter and arms the bomb onboard. Fisher and Molly are able to jump to safety before the helicopter explodes with Jackson inside, killing him. As the stolen money rains from the sky, Fisher and Molly embrace and discuss their now-destroyed home.

== Cast ==
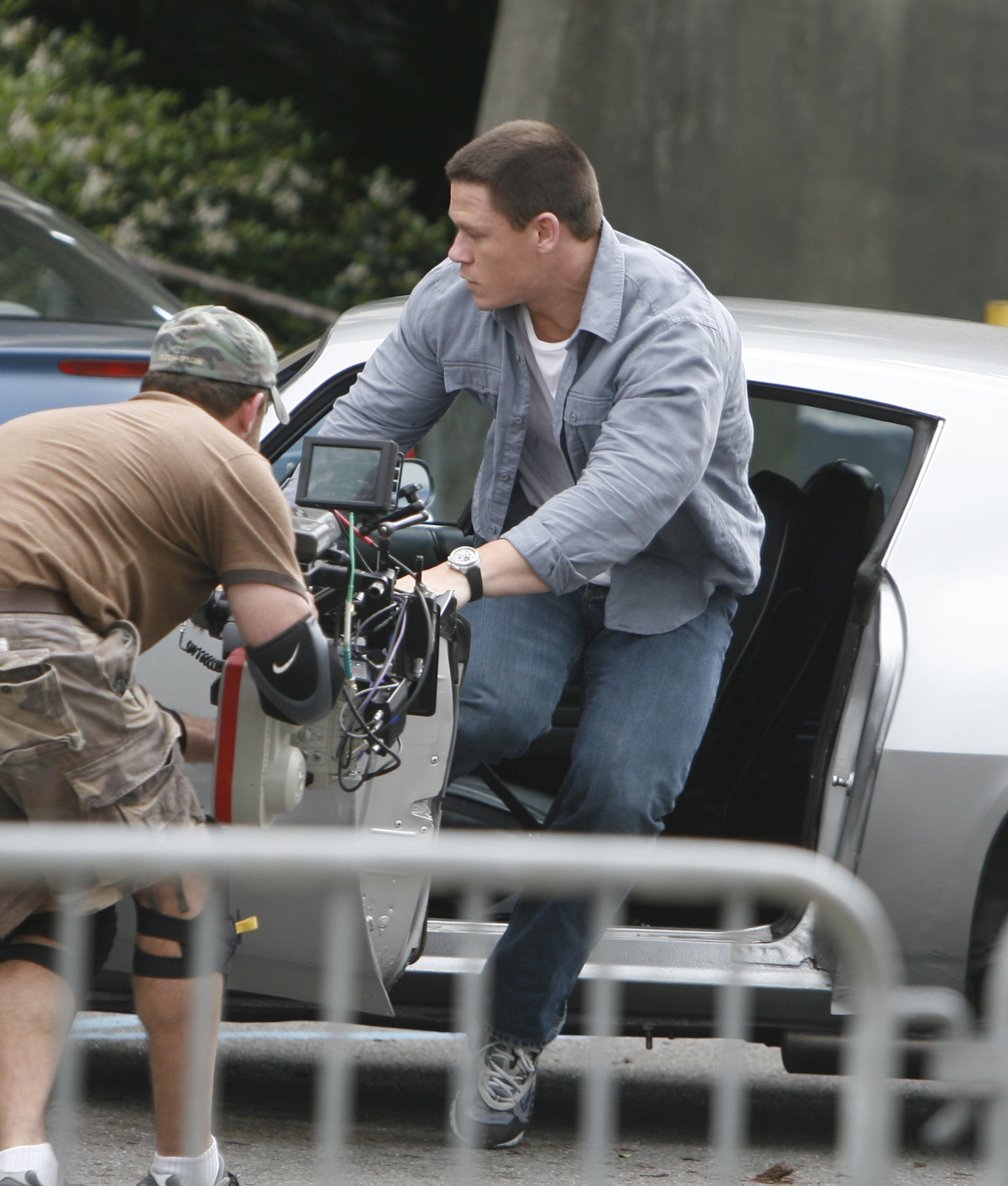
John Cena filming on the set of 12 Rounds.

- John Cena as Danny Fisher
- Aidan Gillen as Miles Jackson
- Ashley Scott as Molly Porter
- Steve Harris as George Aiken
- Brian White as Hank Carver
- Gonzalo Menendez as Ray Santiago
- Taylor Cole as Erica Kessen
- Vincent Flood as Detective Chuck Jansen
- Travis Davis as Anthony Deluso
- Kyle Clements as Dave Fisher
- Billy Slaughter as Technician
- Peter "Navy" Tuiasosopo as Willie Dumaine

== Music ==
The score of 12 Rounds was composed by Trevor Rabin, who had previously worked with director Renny Harlin on Deep Blue Sea and Exorcist: The Beginning. He recorded his score with the Hollywood Studio Symphony at the Eastwood Scoring Stage at Warner Bros. Studios.

=== Soundtrack ===
1. "Feel You" – Crumbland
2. "Ready to Fall" – Rise Against
3. "12 Rounds Suite" – Trevor Rabin

== Reception ==
=== Box office ===
The filmed opened at number seven at the box office, gaining an estimate of $1.75 million in its opening day and $5.3 million in its opening weekend. The film grossed $12,234,694 in the United States and Canada, and $5,045,632 in other territories, for a worldwide total of $17,280,326.

=== Critical response ===
12 Rounds has received mostly negative reviews from critics. Some critics have noted the film's similarities to the 1995 film Die Hard with a Vengeance. On Rotten Tomatoes the film has an approval rating of 31% based on reviews from 71 critics. The site's consensus reads: "Energetic but empty, 12 Rounds' preposterous plot hurtles along at a rapid pace, but can't disguise the derivative script". On Metacritic, the film has a weighted average score of 38%, based on 13 reviews. Audiences surveyed by CinemaScore gave the film a grade of B−.

Rob Nelson of Variety wrote that the film is heavy on stunts but light on plausibility, humor, surprise, visual ingenuity or psychological depth. Nathan Rabin of The A.V. Club called the film "honest trash: it never pretends to be anything other than manic schlock" and gave it a grade C+.

== Home media ==
12 Rounds was released on DVD, Blu-ray and UMD with an unrated "Extreme Cut" of the film on June 30, 2009. In the first week, 12 Rounds opened at #1 at the DVD sales chart, selling 208,936 DVD units translating to revenue of $3.1m. As of July 2011, 581,834 DVD units have been sold, bringing in $8,884,292 in revenue. This does not include Blu-ray Disc sales/DVD rentals.

== Sequels ==
Randy Orton stars in a stand-alone sequel titled 12 Rounds 2: Reloaded. The sequel was released in 2013. 12 Rounds 3: Lockdown starring Dean Ambrose was released in 2015.
