= Aaron O'Connell =

American actor and model (born 1986)

- Born: April 8, 1986 (age 40); Dayton, Ohio, U.S.
- Education: Cathedral High School; Purdue University (BS)
- Occupations: Actor, model
- Years active: 2006 – present
- Height: 6 ft (1.8 m)
- Spouse: Natalie Pack (m. 2018)
- Children: 1

Aaron John O'Connell (born April 8, 1986) is an American model and actor known for his portrayal of Wyatt Cryer in the prime time television drama The Haves and the Have Nots, which aired on the Oprah Winfrey Network.

== Early life ==
O'Connell is the only son of Mark O'Connell, a former player for the Cincinnati Bengals, and Kathryn Deeble O'Connell. He has three sisters, Amy, Abby and Anna. He graduated from Cathedral High School in Indianapolis in 2004; he played football, basketball and baseball. As a child, his maternal grandfather Wayne taught him how to play the piano. In 2008, O'Connell graduated from Purdue University's College of Health and Human Sciences, where he received a bachelor's degree in health and fitness.

== Career ==
=== Modeling ===
In 2006, O'Connell signed to Ford Models while still in college. He has been featured in publications, including GQ, Vanity Fair, Vogue, Vogue Paris, Arena Homme +, VMAN. O'Connell has also represented brands, including Abercrombie & Fitch, Hanes, Lucky Brand Jeans, Ralph Lauren, Champion and Jockey.

=== Acting ===
Starting his career at the Actors Studio in Chicago, O'Connell permanently relocated to Los Angeles so he could continue modeling, and start acting. O'Connell started acting classes. He eventually booked several commercials, including a Liquid-Plumr commercial where he caught the eye of filmmaker Tyler Perry. O'Connell initially thought it was a joke when he was contacted by Perry's production company about auditioning for a role in a new television series. Perry contacted O'Connell himself and asked him to audition over Skype. Perry then traveled to Los Angeles to meet with O'Connell about the role of Wyatt on The Haves and the Have Nots. O'Connell was the first of the ensemble to be cast.

In 2015, he starred in the seasonal comedy for Hallmark Channel 12 Gifts of Christmas as Marc Rehnquist, a company executive who hires a personal shopper and discovers the true spirit of Christmas is not money, and also played a leading part in A Prince for Christmas. In 2017, he starred in Hallmark Channel's With Love, Christmas, as Donovan Goodwin, with Emilie Ullerup as his co-star.

== Personal life ==
O'Connell became engaged to his longtime girlfriend, model Natalie Pack, on September 4, 2017. The couple were married on July 21, 2018, at Lake Como in Italy. Their son was born in August 2022.

In 2013, he gained his private pilot's license, and flies a Cirrus SR22.

== Filmography ==
Year	Title	Role	Notes
2013	LAID: Life as It's Dealt	Jogger	Film
2013-2021	The Haves and the Have Nots	Wyatt Cryer	Main; 88 Episodes
2014	The Tyler Perry Show	Himself	Guest; 1 Episode
2015	12 Gifts of Christmas	Marc Rehnquist	Television Film
2015	A Prince for Christmas	Todd	Television Film
2015, 2017	Home & Family	Himself	Guest; 2 Episodes
2016	The Real	Himself	Guest; 1 Episode
2016	My Christmas Love	Scott	Television Film
2017	With Love, Christmas	Donovan Goodwin	Television Film
2018	Lethal Weapon	Derek	Guest; 1 Episode
2018	Black Water	Ellis	Film
2018	This Is Our Christmas	Nathan Winslow	Film
2018	Runnin' from my Roots	Gavin Whitfield	Film
2021	Blending Christmas	Liam	Lifetime Film
2022	Love Accidentally	Jason	Television Film
2023	Made for Each Other	Clay	Television film
2023	Heels	Young Tom Spade	2 episodes
2024	Junebug	Alex	Television film
2025	Finding Joy	Colton	Film
