= Into the Blue (2005 film) =

American action-thriller film by John Stockwell

- Theatrical release poster
- Directed by: John Stockwell
- Written by: Matt Johnson
- Produced by: David Zelon
- Starring: Paul Walker; Jessica Alba; Scott Caan; Ashley Scott; Josh Brolin; James Frain
- Cinematography: Shane Hurlbut
- Edited by: Nicolas De Toth; Dennis Virkler
- Music by: Paul Haslinger
- Production companies: Metro-Goldwyn-Mayer Pictures; Mandalay Pictures
- Distributed by: Columbia Pictures (North America; through Sony Pictures Releasing); 20th Century Fox (International)
- Release date: September 30, 2005 (United States)
- Running time: 110 minutes
- Country: United States
- Language: English
- Budget: $50 million
- Box office: $46.1 million

Into the Blue is a 2005 American action-thriller film directed by John Stockwell and written by Matt Johnson. The film stars Paul Walker and Jessica Alba with Scott Caan, Ashley Scott, Josh Brolin and James Frain in supporting roles, and focuses on a group of divers who go treasure hunting and find a sunken plane filled with illicit shipments. The film was co-produced by Metro-Goldwyn-Mayer Pictures and Mandalay Pictures and distributed by Columbia Pictures (through Sony Pictures Releasing) in North America and 20th Century Fox internationally, and released theatrically on September 30, 2005 to negative reviews from critics, and grossed $46.1 million against a $50 million budget, becoming a box-office bomb.

== Plot ==
A sea plane flying on a stormy night malfunctions and crashes in the sea off the coast of The Bahamas.

Sam and Jared are a couple living a rustic life in a trailer, next to the beach in The Bahamas. Sam works as a guide in the local aquatic theme park, while Jared works several odd jobs in his field of passion, diving. His dream is to find one of many treasure-filled merchant and pirate ships lost in the waters around The Bahamas. Derek Bates has similar dreams and a better boat, but Jared turns down repeated offers to work for him.

Jared's childhood friend, Bryce, and his girlfriend, Amanda (whom he just met the night before), come to visit. Bryce, a lawyer in New York City, has acquired the use of a luxury vacation house from a client he defended. While snorkeling, Jared finds artifacts on the sea bed that seem to stem from a ship wreck. The four of them investigate and find other pieces that turn out to be the remains of legendary French pirate ship Zephyr. They also discover the crashed plane and its cargo of cocaine—Bryce and Amanda want to recover it, but Jared refuses, dispersing the brick they retrieved into the ocean.

Needing money for equipment to salvage the treasure, Bryce and Amanda dive to the plane then try to sell some bricks of recovered cocaine to night club owner Primo. Primo turns out to be an associate of drug lord Reyes, to whom the cocaine belonged in the first place.

Reyes threatens Jared, Bryce, and Amanda, demanding that they retrieve his cocaine or face deadly consequences. The trio inform Sam, who berates Jared for violating his principles by helping a drug lord. He tries to explain the situation, but she leaves him, saying that 'they' are over. After nightfall, Jared, Bryce, and Amanda dive at the plane wreck to salvage the cocaine and more artifacts. As they are moving the cocaine packs from the plane to their boat, Amanda is attacked and bitten on the leg by a tiger shark. They abandon the cocaine at the dive site to rush her to the hospital, where she dies. Hearing of the tragedy, Sam reunites with Jared, mourning for the loss of Amanda.

Sam insists on going to the police, and goes to the home of one of hers and Jared's close friends, cop Roy. Roy turns her over to Derek Bates, since he was Reyes' partner in the cocaine deal. Primo has captured Jared and taken him aboard Reyes' ship, where they find that Bates has killed Reyes and his entire crew, eventually killing Primo and Roy (when he tries to stand up for Sam) as well. Jared escapes after learning that Bates killed Reyes and learns of Sam's capture when he and Bryce try to contact her.

Jared and Bryce then set out to rescue Sam from Bates's ship, now nearing the plane. Sam is handcuffed and gagged with duct tape as Jared too is tied up. As they near the plane, Jared dives into the water and escapes his bonds, hoping to lure Bates and his men into the water as well. Aided by Bryce, who has hidden in the plane, Jared kills Bates's divers at the plane with the unintentional help of sharks, while their friend Danny helps Sam dispatch the men on Bates's boat after she escapes her shackles. Below, Jared and Bates are the only ones left. After getting Bryce to safety, Jared confronts Bates in the plane, eventually using an air tank as a missile by hammering off the valve. Bates dodges it, but it hits the fuel tank at the back of the plane, causing an explosion, killing Bates. Sam jumps into the water and rescues Jared, who escapes.

Six weeks later, the trio is salvaging the Zephyr on Jared's new boat. While they are trying to bring an old cannon to the surface, the rope breaks and the cannon sinks back down breaking a part of the ship. Jared is ready to call it a night, but Bryce, who is unwilling to give up, dives in again and shouts that he has found gold.

== Cast ==
- Paul Walker as Jared
- Jessica Alba as Sam
- Scott Caan as Bryce
- Ashley Scott as Amanda
- Josh Brolin as Bates
- James Frain as Reyes
- Tyson Beckford as Primo
- Dwayne Adway as Roy
- Javon Frazer as Danny

== Production ==
=== Filming ===
The special features section of the DVD chronicles how much of the film was filmed as live-action shots in the sea off the Bahamas, with live, wild sharks. It shows film crews wearing chain mail as protection, while the cast members perform in the water unprotected. The filming was made possible by the development of shark tourism in the Bahamas. The sharks are used to being hand fed and will not generally attack humans, but as a result, will grab any item that "hits" the water as potential food. In an early scene, Paul Walker has to grab two fins and a dive mask flung to him by Jessica Alba. During filming, he missed the mask. It was never seen again after hitting the water and the DVD suggests that it was taken by a shark.

In an interview with Sean Evans on October 1, 2020 (on the film's 15th Anniversary) for his show Hot Ones, Jessica Alba explained how the production had caught a tiger shark, which they then caged. Director John Stockwell wanted her and another actor to be in the water with the tiger shark. Alba refused to get into the water, citing concerns about swimming with a wild tiger shark.

During filming, the cast and crew were invited to parties at fashion executive Peter Nygård's Bahamas residence. Alba said on a press tour that the parties were "gross" and involved girls aged roughly 14 stripping naked in Jacuzzis. Nygård sued a Finnish newspaper, Iltalehti, that reported accounts of the parties by cast and crew during the four months of filming. Stockwell said that the house became the location for the production's parties, but that "strange things happened" when local women arrived. Alba said that parties on the weekend began with sports and massages, but young women attending parties on Sunday would have sex in Jacuzzis in front of everybody. Alba left the location as she could not stand to be there. Scott would arrive at parties early and leave when local women arrived. Walker said that the parties were strange, but compared the location to Disneyland and said that he spent a lot of time there. Nygård was arrested in 2020 on charges of sex trafficking, including of minors.

== Soundtrack ==
- "Good Old Days" – Ziggy Marley
- "I Will" – Holly Palmer
- "I'll Be" – O S Xperience
- "Time of Our Lives (Swiss-American Federation Remix)" – Paul van Dyk feat. Vega 4
- "Think It Matters" – Paul Haslinger & Dan di Prima
- "Clav Dub" – Rhombus
- "No Trouble" – Shawn Barry
- "Whoa Now" – Louque
- "VIP" – D Bo (produced by Rik Carey of BahaMen)
- "J.O.D.D." – Trick Daddy feat. Khia & Tampa Tony
- "Of Course Nigga You Can" – Billy Steel
- "Perique" – Louque
- "Wonderful World, Beautiful People" – Jimmy Cliff
- "Remember The times" – Abdel Wright

== Release ==
=== Box office ===
Into the Blue was produced on a budget of $50 million, and made $18.8 million in North America and $26.3 million internationally for a total of $46.1 million worldwide. The film was distributed by Sony Pictures Releasing in the United States and by 20th Century Fox Internationally.

=== Critical response ===
On the review aggregator website Rotten Tomatoes, 20% of 123 critics' reviews are positive, with an average rating of 4.1/10. The website's consensus reads: "Even the endless shots of bronzed beach babes and buffed dudes can't keep this soggy scuba flick's plot from drowning." Metacritic, which uses a weighted average, assigned the film a score of 45 out of 100, based on 28 critics, indicating "mixed or average" reviews. Audiences polled by CinemaScore gave the film an average grade of "B" on an A+ to F scale.

Roger Ebert and Richard Roeper were divided on their show At the Movies; in his column, Ebert praised the film as "written, acted and directed as a story, not as an exercise in mindless kinetic energy", awarding it three out of four stars. Conversely, Roeper wrote, "I don't think there's anything wrong with an escapist adventure, but if you're rolling your eyes in disbelief at the plot and the dialogue, it makes it hard to enjoy the scenery".

=== Awards ===
Jessica Alba earned a nomination for Worst Actress at the 26th Golden Raspberry Awards for her performance in the film (as well as for her performance in Fantastic Four), but 'lost' to Jenny McCarthy for Dirty Love.

== Sequel ==
A sequel, Into the Blue 2: The Reef, was released direct to DVD in 2009. The cast consists of Chris Carmack, Laura Vandervoort, Audrina Patridge, and Mircea Monroe; none of the cast from the first film returned.
