= 12 Gifts of Christmas =

2015 film by Peter Sullivan

- Promotional poster
- Written by: Lynn Grant Beck; Jennifer Notas Shapiro; Peter Sullivan
- Directed by: Peter Sullivan
- Starring: Katrina Law; Aaron O'Connell; Donna Mills
- Music by: Matthew Janszen
- Country of origin: United States
- Original language: English

Production
- Producers: Barry Barnholtz; Amy Goldberg; Zelma Kiwi; Jeffrey Schenck
- Cinematography: Theo Angell
- Editor: Randy Carter
- Running time: 84 minutes
- Production company: Hybrid

Original release
- Network: Hallmark Channel
- Release: November 26, 2015

12 Gifts of Christmas is a 2015 American Christmas romantic comedy television film directed by Peter Sullivan and written by Sullivan, Lynn Grant Beck and Jennifer Notas Shapiro. The film stars Katrina Law, Aaron O'Connell and Donna Mills. It premiered on Hallmark Channel on November 26, 2015, and later re-aired every Christmas season during the Countdown to Christmas.

== Premise ==
A personal Christmas shopper from New York City is hired by a busy marketing executive for buying gifts for his friends and family.

== Cast ==
- Katrina Law as Anna Parisi
- Aaron O'Connell as Marc Rehnquist
- Donna Mills as Joyce Rehnquist
- Melanie Nelson as Marie Parisi
- Ali Durham as Yvonne
- Jill Adler as Sandy
- Michael Burchard as Edward Maxwell
- Alex Nibley as Andrew Rehnquist
- Laiya White as Bella
- Alyssa Buckner as Sophia

== Production ==
The film was shot in Salt Lake City, Utah. Katrina Law and Aaron O'Connell were cast as leads, while Donna Mills was cast as O'Connell's mother.

== Reception ==
It was seen by 3.14 million viewers upon release on November 26, 2015, more than any other scripted show on that day.
