= Major League (film) =

1989 sports comedy film by David S. Ward

- Theatrical release poster
- Directed by: David S. Ward
- Written by: David S. Ward
- Produced by: Chris Chesser; Irby Smith
- Starring: Tom Berenger; Charlie Sheen; Corbin Bernsen; Margaret Whitton; James Gammon; Rene Russo; Bob Uecker
- Cinematography: Reynaldo Villalobos
- Edited by: Dennis M. Hill
- Music by: James Newton Howard
- Production companies: Morgan Creek Productions; Mirage Productions
- Distributed by: Paramount Pictures (United States and Canada); J&M Entertainment (international)
- Release date: April 7, 1989
- Running time: 106 minutes
- Country: United States
- Language: English
- Budget: $11 million
- Box office: $75 million

Major League is a 1989 American sports comedy film produced by Chris Chesser and Irby Smith, written and directed by David S. Ward, that stars Tom Berenger, Charlie Sheen, Wesley Snipes, James Gammon, Bob Uecker, Rene Russo, Margaret Whitton, Dennis Haysbert, and Corbin Bernsen.

Telling the story of a single regular season of a fictionalized version of the Cleveland Indians of Major League Baseball. Major League was released on April 7, 1989 by Paramount Pictures in the United States, with J&M Entertainment releasing in other territories. The film grossed $75 million worldwide from an $11 million budget and received generally positive reviews from critics. It spawned two sequels (Major League II and Major League: Back to the Minors), neither of which repeated the success of the original film.

== Plot ==
Former Las Vegas showgirl Rachel Phelps inherits the struggling Cleveland Indians baseball team from her deceased husband. She intends to move the team to Miami by exploiting an escape clause in their contract with the city of Cleveland: if their season attendance falls below a certain number, she can terminate the lease and move the team. In an act of sabotage, she plans to create the worst team in the major leagues, instructing team executives to cut the current players from the roster and replace them with rookies and washed-up veterans. She starts by hiring Lou Brown, 30-year manager of the Triple-A Toledo Mud Hens.

Spring training begins in Tucson, Arizona, with Phelps' list of players likely to fail: Jake Taylor, a former all-star catcher with bad knees; veteran third baseman Roger Dorn, a prima donna more concerned with his financial portfolio than playing good baseball; aging starting pitcher Eddie Harris, who has resorted to doctoring the baseball; outfielder Pedro Cerrano, a voodoo-practicing power slugger who has trouble hitting breaking balls; speedy outfielder Willie Mays Hayes, who can steal bases but is a terrible hitter; and rookie pitcher Ricky Vaughn, an ex-con who has a 100-mile-per-hour (160 km/h) fastball but no control, earning him the nickname "Wild Thing."

The players struggle to come together as a team, with a feud developing between Dorn and Vaughn. They discover that Vaughn suffers from poor eyesight, which explains his lack of control, and once fitted with glasses, he becomes a dominant pitcher. Team morale and performance improve, so Phelps cancels several amenities, such as downgrading the team's private jet to a run-down bus, but they continue to build on their strengths. Meanwhile, Taylor reconnects with his old girlfriend Lynn and tries to rekindle their relationship, even though she is engaged to another man.

Nearly three-quarters of the way through the season, the team is 60–61, exceeding expectations, and fans have begun to fill the stands. Phelps's general manager, Charlie Donovan, tired of her manipulations, reveals her scheme to Brown. Brown relays the message to his team, telling them that, win or lose, their contracts will all be terminated after the season. To thwart Phelps' plan, Taylor decides that the only thing left to do is win.

The Indians, who appear to be positioning themselves for a run, finally make one and win 32 of their final 44 games, finishing in a tie with the New York Yankees for first place in the American League East division on the final day of the season, requiring a one-game playoff to determine the division champion and a bid to the ALCS. Watching the team's celebration on television, Dorn's wife Suzanne sees him in an amorous embrace with another woman. At the same time, Vaughn is dejected after Brown chooses to go with veteran Harris in the playoff game. Suzanne Dorn approaches Vaughn as he drowns his sorrows in a bar and, in revenge against her husband, she sleeps with Vaughn (who is unaware of who she is). She informs Roger just before he leaves for the ballpark the next morning.

The Indians keep pace with the Yankees, and the playoff game enters the ninth tied 2–2. Called on to relieve Harris, Vaughn strikes out Clu Haywood, the Yankees' best power hitter, with three consecutive fastballs. With Hayes on second base in the bottom of the ninth, Taylor calls for and executes a surprise bunt-and-run play, scoring Hayes. The Indians win 3–2 and advance to the postseason. In the ensuing celebration, Dorn punches Vaughn for sleeping with his wife but pulls him up and they celebrate. Jake spots Lynn in the stands, and she holds up her hand to reveal that her engagement has been called off, and their relationship is rekindled.

=== Alternate ending ===
The theatrical release shows Phelps in the owner's box in the final game showing dismay with the team's success. An alternate final scene included on the "Wild Thing Edition" DVD shows a different characterization: Brown confronts Phelps over her plan to sabotage the team and attempts to resign. With Phelps reveals that she loves the team and invented plans to move to Miami as a ruse to motivate the players. With her prodding and assurance, Brown takes back his resignation letter, and Phelps says that if he shares their conversation with anyone, she will fire him.

The film's producers said that while the twist ending worked as a resolution of the plot, they scrapped it because test screening audiences preferred Phelps as a villain.

== Cast ==
- Tom Berenger as Jake Taylor, a veteran catcher with bad knees. Taylor is playing in the Mexican League when the Indians call and sees the season as his last chance to be successful. He takes rookies Hayes and Vaughn under his wing.
- Charlie Sheen as Ricky Vaughn, a cocky young pitcher recruited out of prison. He has a powerful fastball but lacks control.
- Corbin Bernsen as third baseman Roger Dorn. Dorn is nearing retirement and fears being injured, believing he has a future in acting, and so initially plays with little effort (despite believing himself to be a star player).
- Margaret Whitton as Rachel Phelps, a former showgirl who inherits the team from her billionaire husband just before the film begins. She hates Cleveland and schemes to move the team to Miami.
- James Gammon as Lou Brown, the manager. Brown managed the Toledo Mud Hens for thirty years before taking over the Indians.
- Rene Russo as Lynn Wells, Jake Taylor's ex-girlfriend, a former Olympic athlete-turned librarian. They broke up when he left to play in Mexico, but now he wants to rekindle their romance despite her engagement to someone else.
- Wesley Snipes as center fielder Willie Mays Hayes. He arrives at spring training uninvited, but earns his spot on the team with his impressive speed, despite initially being a terrible hitter.
- Charles Cyphers as Charlie Donovan, the general manager. Rachel Phelps orders him to carry out her plan of tanking the season over his objections; eventually, he reveals her scheme to the team.
- Chelcie Ross as Eddie Harris, a veteran pitcher who doctors the baseball to make up for his diminishing arm strength.
- Dennis Haysbert as Pedro Cerrano, a power hitting outfielder who struggles to hit curveballs. He defected from Cuba seeking the freedom to practice his religion of voodoo.
- Andy Romano as first base coach Pepper Leach.
- Bob Uecker as Harry Doyle, the sardonic radio sports commentator for the Indians.
- Stacy Carroll as Suzanne Dorn, the wife of Roger Dorn.

In addition to former catcher and longtime Milwaukee Brewers team broadcaster Uecker appearing in the film's main cast, three former Major League players have brief cameos in the film: World Series MVP catcher Steve Yeager as Indians third base coach Duke Temple; Cy Young Award-winning pitcher Pete Vuckovich as Yankees first baseman Clu Haywood; and an uncredited performance by pitcher Willie Mueller – who made brief appearances in six Major League games – as Yankees pitcher Duke Simpson.

== Production ==
=== Development ===
Ward, who grew up in the Cleveland suburb of South Euclid, Ohio, reflected on filming a movie about a Cleveland team that had not won a pennant since his childhood. “I figured I would never see the Indians win anything unless I wrote a movie where they did. That was the real genesis behind the movie."

The film's opening montage is a series of somber blue-collar images of the Cleveland landscape synchronized to the score of Randy Newman's "Burn On", an ode to the infamous day in Cleveland when the heavily polluted Cuyahoga River caught fire in 1969.

Many of the film's spring training scenes were shot at Hi Corbett Field in Tucson, Arizona, which was the spring training home for the Cleveland Indians from 1947 to 1992. The production used members of the University of Arizona Wildcats baseball team as extras.

Despite being set in Cleveland, the film was principally shot in Milwaukee because it was cheaper (Ward noted that Cleveland was a big union town) and the producers were unable to work around the schedules of the Cleveland Indians and Cleveland Browns. Milwaukee County Stadium, then the home of the Brewers (and three Green Bay Packers games per season), doubles as Cleveland Stadium for the film, although several exterior shots of Cleveland Stadium were used, including some aerial shots taken during an Indians game. In fact, the sign for the television station atop the scoreboard is for WTMJ-TV, the NBC affiliate for Milwaukee. One of the ending scenes of the movie is in West Milwaukee's legendary restaurant, 4th Base which showcases their unique horseshoe bar that is shown in the celebration scenes. Another restaurant scene, at the then Gritz's Pzazz on Milwaukee's north side, was filmed at a restaurant that is no longer open for business. County Stadium was demolished in 2001; the stadium's former playing field is now a Little League baseball field known as Helfaer Field, while the rest of the former site is now a parking lot for the Brewers' current home, American Family Field, which opened in 2001.

Originally in Ward's script, there was a twist involving Whitton's character being revealed to have wanted the team to have won all along, having personally scouted each member of the team with flaws that hid their talent. The film was shot with that ending in mind, complete with reaction shots for the final game depicted of her cheering the team on. However, this was changed due to audience test scores that apparently had grown to like seeing Whitton's character in its villainous form. As such, a small bit of re-shots and editing was done for the climax. The ending (with an introduction by the filmmakers) is included on the DVD for the film.

=== Casting ===
The film was notable for featuring several actors who would go on to stardom: Snipes and Russo were relative unknowns before the movie was released, while Haysbert remained best known as Pedro Cerrano until he portrayed U.S. President David Palmer on the television series 24 and the spokesperson for Allstate Insurance. The longshoreman who is occasionally seen commenting and is shown in the final celebration inside a bar is Neil Flynn, who later achieved fame playing the Janitor in Scrubs and then the father Mike in The Middle. This is Flynn's first credited movie role.

Sheen himself was a pitcher on his high school's baseball team. At the time of filming Major League, his own fastball topped out at 88 miles per hour. In 2011, Sheen said that he had used steroids for nearly two months to improve his athletic abilities in the film.

== Reception ==
=== Box office ===
The film debuted at number 1 at the US box office and received generally positive reviews. It grossed almost $50 million in the United States and Canada and $25 million internationally for a worldwide total of $75 million.

=== Critical response ===
On review aggregator website Rotten Tomatoes Major League holds an approval rating of 83% based on 40 reviews, with an average rating of 6.6/10. The site's critics' consensus reads, "Major League may be predictable and formulaic, but [is] buoyed by the script's light, silly humor—not to mention the well-built sports action sequences and funny performances." On Metacritic, the film has a weighted average score of 62 out of 100 based on 15 critics, indicating "generally favorable reviews". Audiences polled by CinemaScore gave the film an average grade of "A−" on an A+ to F scale.

=== Year-end lists ===
The film is recognized by American Film Institute in these lists:

- 2008: AFI's 10 Top 10:
  - Nominated Sports Film

== Franchise ==
=== Sequels ===
Due to the success of the film, two sequels have been produced, neither of which achieved the original's success. Major League II returned most of the original stars, with the notable exception of Wesley Snipes, and focused on the following season and the players' reaction to the previous season's success. Major League: Back to the Minors again starred Corbin Bernsen, but this time, as the owner of the Minnesota Twins, attempting to turn around the Twins' AAA team, the Buzz. A possible third sequel, Major League 3 (which was to ignore Back to the Minors), was reported in 2010 to be in development by original writer and producer David S. Ward. Charlie Sheen, Tom Berenger, and Snipes were reported to return, with the plot revolving around Ricky Vaughn coming out of retirement to work with a young player. In 2015, Morgan Creek Productions said that the sequel was still in the works.

=== Reboot ===
In 2017, Morgan Creek announced plans to reboot their classic films from the 1980s and 1990s as television series or movies following the success of The Exorcist television series. Several films in early stages of development include film series Young Guns, Major League, and Ace Ventura.

== Other media ==
=== Video game ===
Major League was made into and released as a sports video game, developed by Lenar and published by Irem, exclusively for the Family Computer in Japan in 1989.

=== Jobu ===
Soon after the film's 25th anniversary in 2015, a company called "The Jobu Lifestyle" began producing figurines of Jobu (Pedro Cerrano's voodoo figure). The packaging is a reference to Cerrano's locker that made up Jobu's shrine.

In news coverage of the 2017 World Baseball Classic, Team Israel's outfielder Cody Decker made a comparison between Jobu and the team's mascot, "Mensch on a Bench", a five-foot-tall stuffed toy that looks a bit like a rabbi or Hasidic Jew: "He's a mascot, he's a friend, he's a teammate, he's a borderline deity to our team.... He brings a lot to the table.... Every team needs their Jobu. He was ours. He had his own locker, and we even gave him offerings: Manischewitz, gelt, and gefilte fish... He is everywhere and nowhere all at once. His actual location is irrelevant because he exists in higher metaphysical planes. But he's always near."

== In popular culture ==
Rachel Phelps' character is loosely based on that of Georgia Frontiere, a past owner of the Los Angeles / St. Louis Rams, in the way she took over the franchise and how she was initially perceived. She took over ownership and control of the Rams upon the death of her husband in 1979, and eventually moved the team to her hometown of St. Louis, Missouri in 1995. The Rams (at the time owned by Stan Kroenke, who bought them from Frontiere's family after her own death) returned to Los Angeles in 2016.

The character of veteran junk ball pitcher Eddie Harris is based on that of Gaylord Perry and his affinity for throwing baseballs doctored with vaseline, spit, or any other substance known to illegally change the movement of a pitch.

When he joined the Cubs in 1989 (the same year the film was released), pitcher Mitch Williams' extravagant wind-up and release, and his frequent wild pitches, earned him the nickname "Wild Thing". As with Rick Vaughn's character, the Wrigley Field organist played "Wild Thing" as Williams came out of the bullpen; this was changed to the rock recording by X from the film after he was traded to the Phillies. A few years later, in 1993 with the Phillies, Williams, who had up to that point in his career, worn the number 28, started wearing the number 99 on his jersey, the same number that Vaughn wears in the film.

In the years since its release Major League has become a beloved film of many professional baseball players and announcers, and is often referenced during game broadcasts. For example, in 2014, for the film's 25th anniversary, Major League catcher David Ross filmed a one-man tribute to the film, with Ross playing the part (among others) of Lou Brown, Pedro Cerrano, Willie Mays Hayes, Rick Vaughn, and Roger Dorn. Additionally, as part of their 2014 "Archives" set, the trading card company Topps celebrated the film's 25th anniversary by creating baseball cards (using the same design as the company's 1989 base set) of Roger Dorn, Jake Taylor, Eddie Harris, Rachel Phelps, Rick Vaughn, and "Jobu". Harry Doyle's call of a wildly off-target Rick Vaughn pitch that was "JUST a bit outside" is so well-known, film critic Richard Roeper wrote in 2019 that the line was invoked by every sportscaster in the last 30 years. In 2011, Bleacher Report's Timothy Rapp named "JUST a bit outside" his fifth-greatest sports movie quote ever.

In 2017, the University of Arizona men's baseball team created a parody of Major League, which was filmed at UA's current home field, Hi Corbett Field in Tucson, Arizona. Hi Corbett was the spring training home for the Cleveland Indians from 1947 to 1992. The star of the short film is outfielder Matt "Mays" Frazier, who played the role of Snipes' Willie Mays Hayes character from the original film. Rick "Wild Thing" Vaughn and Roger Dorn are also parodied, and Arizona head coach Jay Johnson plays the role of Indians manager Lou Brown.

Major League became an inspiration for the real Cleveland Indians and the city, given the previously long-standing Cleveland sports curse that had left Cleveland without any sporting championships in between 1964 (when the NFL's Cleveland Browns won the NFL Championship) and 2016 (when the NBA's Cleveland Cavaliers won the NBA Finals and secured their first title in their 46-year history). The Indians reached the 2016 World Series, but lost to the similarly cursed Cubs. Between 1995 and 2016, the team went to the World Series three times, losing each time.

The Indians changed their name to the Guardians for the 2022 season. The opening scene of the film is an image of one of the Guardians of Traffic on the Hope Memorial Bridge.

== See also ==
- List of baseball films
- Ted Lasso
