= Major League II =

1994 film by David S. Ward

- Theatrical release poster
- Directed by: David S. Ward
- Screenplay by: R.J. Stewart
- Story by: R.J. Stewart; Tom S. Parker; Jim Jennewein
- Based on: Characters by David S. Ward
- Produced by: James G. Robinson; David S. Ward
- Starring: Charlie Sheen; Tom Berenger; Corbin Bernsen; Dennis Haysbert; James Gammon; Omar Epps; Eric Bruskotter; Bob Uecker; David Keith; Alison Doody; Michelle Burke; Takaaki Ishibashi; Margaret Whitton
- Cinematography: Victor Hammer
- Edited by: Donn Cambern; Kimberly Ray; Paul Seydor; Frederick Wardell
- Music by: Michel Colombier
- Production company: Morgan Creek Productions
- Distributed by: Warner Bros.
- Release date: March 30, 1994
- Running time: 105 minutes
- Country: United States
- Language: English
- Budget: $25 million
- Box office: $53 million

Major League II is a 1994 American sports comedy film and sequel to the 1989 film Major League and it is the second installment in the Major League film series. The film stars most of the same cast from the original, including Charlie Sheen, Tom Berenger, and Corbin Bernsen. Absent from this film is Wesley Snipes, who played Willie Mays Hayes in the first film and who had become a film star in his own right by 1994. Omar Epps took over his role. Several new cast members appear in Major League II. David Keith plays Jack Parkman, a selfish superstar catcher who is looking to replace the aging Jake Taylor (Tom Berenger) as the starter. Takaaki Ishibashi, of Japanese comedic duo Tunnels, is outfielder Isuro "Kamikaze" Tanaka who helps excite the team. Eric Bruskotter is rookie catcher Rube Baker who is getting used to the MLB life. Unlike the first film, which was rated R, Major League II was rated PG and released by Warner Bros. instead of Paramount Pictures.

== Plot ==
After winning the division title the previous season, success has changed the attitudes of the Cleveland Indians despite losing the American League Championship against the Chicago White Sox. Rick "Wild Thing" Vaughn has become a media sensation and is more concerned about his public image than his pitching. Home run hitter Pedro Cerrano becomes a Buddhist and adopts a carefree style. Center fielder Willie Mays Hayes has become a Hollywood actor and fancies himself a power hitter since he got injured in his movie. Aging catcher and team leader Jake Taylor is dealing with injuries to his knees.

Rachel Phelps, the owner who attempted to sabotage them last season, sells the team to Roger Dorn, who has retired as an active player to become the team owner. One of his first acts is to sign arrogant Oakland Athletics all-star catcher Jack Parkman, which forces Jake to compete for his old position. Minor-league catcher Rube Baker has also been invited to camp despite his inability to consistently throw the ball back to the pitcher. As the team breaks camp, manager Lou Brown informs Taylor that he is keeping him on as a coach rather than a player.

The Indians get off to a slow start. Parkman becomes a divisive figure in the clubhouse due to his ego, for which Lou suspends him. Parkman then informs Lou that the suspension is moot as he has been traded to the White Sox. In return, Japanese import Isuro “Kamikaze” Tanaka, a gifted left fielder with a penchant for crashing into the fence, arrives.

Out of options, Dorn sells the Indians back to Rachel Phelps. She retains Dorn as general manager, and he re-activates himself as a player. Rachel has another chance to move the team to Miami since the team slumped back to last place. Lou suffers a heart attack due to his frustration over the team's performance, and Jake takes over as manager.

When Rube is hit by a pitch in his ankle during a doubleheader against the Boston Red Sox, Hayes is called upon to run for him but refuses, which angers Jake. Vaughn quarrels with Hayes and the two begin fighting, which leads to the entire team fighting each other and getting ejected. After the game, Rube chastises the other players for their lack of passion. Inspired, Hayes volunteers to run for the injured Rube in the second game and steals second, third, and home to tie the score. Cerrano, also inspired, hits the game-winning home run.

The win sparks a hot streak that the Indians ride to a second straight division title. In the ALCS, the Indians meet the White Sox and win the first three games of the series. Phelps gives the team a phony pep talk before Game 4, designed to distract them. The White Sox then defeat the Indians three times, forcing a seventh game in Cleveland. The night before the game, Jake tells Vaughn that he might be called on to pitch in relief in Game 7. Vaughn nonchalantly says he will be ready. An infuriated Jake calls him out for having lost his edge and advises him to find it again before the game.

The White Sox again jump out to an early lead, but rally after Cerrano, having apparently found a balance between his newfound faith and his baseball competitiveness, hits the go ahead home run late. Still, the Indians cannot close out the game and the White Sox put the lead runs on base in the top of the ninth.

Jake calls on Vaughn to get the last out, and he emerges from the bullpen having apparently taken his manager's advice. He also insists on walking the current batter in favor of the on-deck hitter, his nemesis Parkman. Vaughn strikes Parkman out to give the Indians the pennant.

== Cast ==
- Charlie Sheen as Rick "Wild Thing" Vaughn
- Tom Berenger as Jake Taylor
- Corbin Bernsen as Roger Dorn
- Dennis Haysbert as Pedro Cerrano
- James Gammon as Lou Brown
- Omar Epps as Willie Mays Hayes
- Bob Uecker as Harry Doyle
- David Keith as Jack Parkman
- Takaaki Ishibashi as Isuro "Kamikaze" Tanaka
- Margaret Whitton as Rachel Phelps
- Eric Bruskotter as Rube Baker
- Alison Doody as Rebecca Flannery
- Michelle Burke as Nicki Reese
- Jay Leno as himself
- Richard Schiff as a commercial director
- Jesse Ventura as White Lightning
- Steve Yeager as Coach Duke Temple
- Kevin Hickey as Schoup
- Ashton Smith as Announcer
- Randy Quaid as Johnny (uncredited)
- Rene Russo as Lynn Wells (uncredited)

== Reception ==
=== Box office ===
The movie debuted at number one at the US box office, knocking out D2: The Mighty Ducks, another sports comedy featuring Major League star Charlie Sheen's brother, Emilio Estevez. In the United States and Canada, the movie grossed a total of $30,626,182 at the box office. It also opened at number one in Japan, where it remained for three weeks. Worldwide, it grossed $53.2 million.

=== Critical response ===
On Rotten Tomatoes Major League II holds an approval rating of 5% based on 21 reviews, with an average rating of 3.3/10. The site's critics consensus states: "Striking out on every joke, Major League II is a lazy sequel that belongs on the bench." Audiences polled by CinemaScore gave the film an average grade of "B" on an A+ to F scale.

In one of the few positive reviews of the film, Rick Vanderknyff of Los Angeles Times wrote: "If that basic plot is at the core of just about every sports movie ever made, a slight variation often fuels their sequels. The team, spoiled by success, starts to get cocky, distracted by the temptations of fame, and loses sight of the things that made it a winner in the first place--only to regain its balance in time for the rousing big-game finale."

=== Year-end lists ===
- Dishonorable mention – Dan Craft, The Pantagraph

== Sequel ==
David S. Ward announced in 2010 that he was working on a new film, which he called Major League 3, and hoped to cast the original stars Charlie Sheen, Wesley Snipes and Tom Berenger. The plot would have seen Sheen's character Ricky "Wild Thing" Vaughn coming out of retirement to work with a young player. The film was seen as the third film in the series, despite the fact that a third film, Major League: Back to the Minors, was released in 1998.

In 2011 in Cleveland, Ohio, Charlie Sheen during his "violent torpedoes of truth" tour announced to the audience that he was working on a third sequel, titled Major League 3, and said "We are gonna shoot it right here in Cleveland!" He opened the show wearing a "Rick Vaughn" #99 Cleveland Indians jersey.

== Trivia ==
When Japanese pitching pioneer Hideo Nomo signed with the Los Angeles Dodgers, he chose to wear uniform number 16 in tribute to the character Taka Tanaka, played by Takaaki Ishibashi in Major League II, who wore the same number. At a time when many figures in Japanese professional baseball were skeptical of Nomo's decision to pursue a career in Major League Baseball, Ishibashi publicly supported him, including inviting him to appear on his television program for a farewell special before his departure to the United States. Nomo's selection of No. 16 has been widely regarded as a gesture of gratitude and a symbol of their friendship.

== Notes ==
Cleveland Stadium was not used, just as it was not used in the first film. Oriole Park at Camden Yards in Baltimore replaced Milwaukee County Stadium as the stand-in for the team's home. Although Oriole Park bore a stronger resemblance to the stadium that the Indians were playing in when Major League II was released (the now-Progressive Field), like Milwaukee County Stadium in the first film it was used to represent Cleveland Stadium as the new ballpark was not yet named at the time of the filming. The outfield scoreboard at Oriole Park reads "Welcome to Cleveland Stadium" at various points and scenes in the outfield are played in front of a blue wall, which Cleveland Stadium had (Oriole Park and Progressive Field both have dark green outfield walls). In one scene, a sign for the "Sheraton Inner Harbor" can be seen above an outfielder's head. The Sheraton Inner Harbor is a hotel located in Baltimore's Inner Harbor, not Cleveland.

A year after this film was released, the actual Cleveland Indians team made it to the 1995 World Series, which was the team's first playoff appearance in 41 years. The Indians ended up losing in six games to the Atlanta Braves. In the lead-up to Game 3, the first World Series game played in Cleveland in 41 years, the public address system played "The House Is Rockin", the song from the end of Major League II. In another coincidence, Bob Uecker served as a commentator for the 1995 World Series television coverage on NBC, which shared broadcasting rights with rival network ABC, thanks to a strike that cancelled the final two months of the 1994 season, as well as the postseason and World Series. Two years after that, the Indians made it to the World Series again (also telecast by NBC and again with Uecker as a commentator) ended up with the same result, this time losing to the Florida Marlins in seven games. It would be 19 years before the Indians returned to the World Series, which they would once again lose in seven games to the Chicago Cubs; this came a mere four months after the city's NBA team, the Cavaliers, had defeated the heavily favored Golden State Warriors in the NBA Finals that also went seven games, and brought an end to a 52-year championship drought.

== See also ==
- List of baseball films
