= List of Who's the Boss? episodes =

The following is an episode list for the American television sitcom Who's the Boss?. The series stars Tony Danza and Judith Light, and centers on a widowed ex-Major League Baseball player from Brooklyn who relocates to an affluent Connecticut suburb with his daughter to become the housekeeper for a divorced advertising executive, her son, and her mother. The series ran on ABC for eight seasons, debuting on September 20, 1984, and concluding with an hour-long series finale (part of a three-episode story arc) on April 25, 1992.

== Series overview ==
| Season | Episodes | Originally released | | Rank | Rating | Viewers (millions) |
| Season | Episodes | First released | Last released | Rank | Rating | Viewers (millions) |
|---|---|---|---|---|---|---|
| 1 | 22 | September 20, 1984 | April 16, 1985 | 31 | 15.8 | —N/a |
| 2 | 26 | September 24, 1985 | May 13, 1986 | 10 | 21.1 | —N/a |
| 3 | 24 | September 23, 1986 | May 19, 1987 | 10 | 22.0 | —N/a |
| 4 | 24 | September 22, 1987 | May 17, 1988 | 6 | 21.2 | —N/a |
| 5 | 25 | October 18, 1988 | May 16, 1989 | 7 | 20.8 | 30.9 |
| 6 | 26 | September 19, 1989 | May 8, 1990 | 12 | 17.9 | 27.3 |
| 7 | 25 | September 18, 1990 | May 7, 1991 | 19 | 15.0 (Note: Tied with The CBS Sunday Movie) | 21.9 |
| 8 | 24 | September 28, 1991 | April 25, 1992 | 76 | 8.5 | 13.0 |

== Episodes ==
=== Season 1 (1984–85) ===
| No. overall | No. in season | Title | Directed by | Written by | Original release date | Prod. code | Rating/share (households) |
|---|---|---|---|---|---|---|---|
| 1 | 1 | "Pilot" | Bill Persky | Martin Cohan and Blake Hunter | September 20, 1984 | 0101 | 13.2/22 |
Widowed dad Tony Micelli and his street-smart young daughter Samantha decide to leave the mean streets of their poor neighborhood in Brooklyn for a chance at a better life in Connecticut. Tony happens upon a job offer as a live-in housekeeper for wealthy businesswoman Angela Bower and her young son, by means of her flirtatious mother Mona. He puts his machismo aside and takes the job for the betterment of his daughter, and a new "family" is formed. Note: The pilot was filmed in very late 1983, but it wasn't broadcast until months later.
| 2 | 2 | "Briefless Encounter" | Sam Weisman | Martin Cohan and Blake Hunter | September 27, 1984 | 0102 | 10.7/17 |
Tony has been doing a great job at cleaning, and the house is looking much nicer now. However, now he has to do something he didn't want to do – clean Angela's bedroom and personal bathroom. Reluctantly, he agrees. The next day, Tony gets a date with a college professor (who turns out to be Mona's psychology teacher.) He decides to take a bath in Angela's private bathroom for the date – but little does he know, Angela got home early from work and decided to take a bath, also. Tony walks in just as Angela steps out and sees everything. Tony's date arrives just as Tony and Angela are working things out. Mona decides to use what she learned in her psychology class on Tony and Angela but it doesn't work. Since she wants to get on with the date, Tony's date makes several rude comments to Angela, which causes Tony to dump her.
| 3 | 3 | "Angela's First Fight" | Jim Drake | Robert Sternin & Prudence Fraser | October 23, 1984 | 0105 | 18.3/27 |
During a trip to Tony's old neighborhood to find runaway Samantha, Angela must stand up for Tony after he is criticized for being a housekeeper. After proclaiming that fighting is no way to resolve a dispute, Angela ends up in a catfight with the waitress (Julie Carmen) in Tony's old hangout.
| 4 | 4 | "Mona Gets Pinned" | Jim Drake | Ellen Guylas | October 30, 1984 | 0107 | 14.5/22 |
Mona meets Jason, the man of her dreams, but she's old enough to be his mother! After much hiding the truth comes out and Angela, who previously stated that age had no part in love, is aghast. It's not until Jason's parents tell Angela that Mona isn't good enough for their son that she stands up for her mother and does an about face with her opinion.
| 5 | 5 | "A Rash Decision" | Linda Day | Robert Sternin & Prudence Fraser | November 13, 1984 | 0108 | 14.7/22 |
Angela is filming a commercial for a new client, Mr. Larson, when Tony shows up, and ultimately ends up being the star of the soap commercial. Not long after, Tony develops a rash that he and Angela are convinced was caused by the soap. Mr. Larson tries to bribe Angela and Tony with a new account for Angela and a convertible for Tony. They must decide between the bribes or their morals.
| 6 | 6 | "Dinner for Two" | Sam Weisman | Bud Wiser | November 20, 1984 | 0103 | 14.4/22 |
Angela has a date with an old friend from Boston scheduled and Tony has a date scheduled in Brooklyn. When Angela's date backs out at the last minute, Tony stays behind to comfort Angela, but he really wants to be in Brooklyn.
| 7 | 7 | "Sorority Sister" | John Tracy | Dawn Aldredge & Judith Bustany | November 27, 1984 | 0104 | 15.3/23 |
Angela's sorority sister from college comes around and takes an interest in Tony.
| 8 | 8 | "Truth in Dating" | Jim Drake | Bud Wiser | December 4, 1984 | 0106 | 16.8/25 |
Angela is mistaken for Rosie, her energetic secretary, by a man and later accepts a date with him. Elsewhere, Tony takes Angela's Jaguar to the market, where he picks up a woman who thinks the car is his. They both realize nothing good can come out of these relationships.
| 9 | 9 | "Sports Buddies" | Asaad Kelada | Robert Sternin & Prudence Fraser | December 11, 1984 | 0110 | 13.2/20 |
Angela meets a new guy who is a huge sports fan. It does not take long for him to spend more time talking sports with Tony than spending quality time with Angela.
| 10 | 10 | "Requiem" | Asaad Kelada | Story by : Blake Hunter and Martin Cohan; Teleplay by : Paul Robinson Hunter and Robert Sternin & Prudence Fraser | December 18, 1984 | 0113 | 13.5/21 |
Tony has taken on an additional job, and Mona is convinced he is taking care of a girlfriend in New York. When the truth comes out, everyone is stunned to learn that Tony is still paying rent on an apartment in New York that belonged to his recently deceased father.
| 11 | 11 | "Samantha's Growing Up" | Linda Day | Paul Robinson Hunter | January 8, 1985 | 0109 | 16.6/24 |
Samantha is growing up fast, and Tony is reluctant to admit it. Reality sets in when he has to purchase her first bra. When Samantha is upset over his purchase, Tony asks Angela for help shopping for Samantha.
| 12 | 12 | "Paint Your Wagon" | Jim Drake | Lissa Levin | January 15, 1985 | 0112 | 18.1/26 |
Angela's Jaguar is in need of a paint job and she decides on the color sandalwood. Tony decides to overstep his bounds and has it painted diablo red. Angela is furious, and reminds Tony he is just the maid, so Tony decides to act like a butler to Angela.
| 13 | 13 | "Protecting the President" | Harvey Medlinsky | Story by : George Tibbles; Teleplay by : Ellen Guylas | January 22, 1985 | 0111 | 15.7/22 |
Angela is throwing a company party at her home. When one of the vice-presidents starts to make rude comments about Angela, Tony stands up for Angela and throws the guy out of the house.
| 14 | 14 | "Guess Who's Coming Forever?" | John Bowab | Bud Wiser | January 29, 1985 | 0114 | 16.3/24 |
When Mona gets the boot from her apartment, Tony suggests she convert the loft over the garage. She takes Tony's suggestion without clearing it with Angela, who is anything but happy with the new living arrangements.
| 15 | 15 | "Angela's Ex: Part 1" | Linda Day | Robert Sternin and Prudence Fraser | February 5, 1985 | 0115 | 17.3/24 |
The divorce papers are needing to be signed so Angela's ex-husband, Michael comes to town. Angela and Michael find themselves back in each other's arms, and Tony is given two weeks' notice by Michael since his services will no longer be needed.
| 16 | 16 | "Angela's Ex: Part 2" | Linda Day | Robert Sternin and Prudence Fraser | February 12, 1985 | 0116 | 16.8/24 |
Angela and Michael are enjoying their reunion, but it is bittersweet. It does not take long for them to remember what drove the wedge between them in the first place... professional and personal differences. Meanwhile, Tony and Samantha are riding high at his new job.
| 17 | 17 | "Eye on Angela" | John Bowab | Ellen Guylas | February 19, 1985 | 0117 | 23.0/34 |
After a long sleepless night, Tony and Angela end up waking up in the same bed. What is actually a few random innocent mix-ups leads a reporter (Betty White) to believe she has a hot juicy story.
| 18 | 18 | "Double Date" | Michael Zinberg | Bud Wiser | February 26, 1985 | 0118 | 13.4/19 |
The school dance is coming up, and Samantha is excited about it. Tony has been asked to chaperone, and continually takes pictures of Samantha and her date. Samantha's worst fears are realized when Tony is seen kissing her teacher in front of the whole class.
| 19 | 19 | "Tony's Father-in-Law" | Richard Sakai | Ellen Guylas | March 5, 1985 | 0119 | 14.7/21 |
Samantha's grandfather visits, and tells everyone that he is dying. The truth is that he will soon be going to prison. With everyone unaware of the truth, he gladly takes advantage of the sympathy.
| 20 | 20 | "Just Like Tony" | Asaad Kelada | Ken Cinnamon & Karen Wengrod | March 12, 1985 | 0120 | 16.0/24 |
Jonathan gets a (temporary) tattoo and comes home with a hubcap that just happens to be stolen from a police car. When Angela finds out Tony's stories instigated this behavior, she demands to be consulted on every decision in regards to her child. Tony makes the decision to handle this in his own way.
| 21 | 21 | "Keeping Up with Marci" | Asaad Kelada | Michael Poryes | April 9, 1985 | 0121 | 22.5/32 |
Samantha wants to sign up for a high-priced ski club, and though Tony knows he can't afford it, he tells her to sign up anyway. He attempts to save money by cleaning the chimney by himself and makes a terrible mess. He is forced to tell Sam she can't go. Tony refuses to ask Angela for the money so he decides to sell one of his possessions so she can go.
| 22 | 22 | "First Kiss" | Asaad Kelada | Story by : Bud Wiser; Teleplay by : Robert Sternin & Prudence Fraser and Ellen Guylas | April 16, 1985 | 0122 | 15.9/25 |
Angela comes home from a rowdy birthday party, just as Tony returns home from a police-sponsored demonstration of the effects of alcohol on the mind. Both are in a woozy state, and they end up kissing.

=== Season 2 (1985–86) ===
| No. overall | No. in season | Title | Directed by | Written by | Original release date | Prod. code | Rating/share (households) |
|---|---|---|---|---|---|---|---|
| 23 | 1 | "It Happened One Summer: Part 1" | Asaad Kelada | Martin Cohan & Blake Hunter | September 24, 1985 | 0205 | 20.4/33 |
Jonathan is away at summer camp and gets homesick. Angela and Tony go to pick him up and soon realize they had both attended the same camp over the same summer years earlier. They tell each other the stories of their first kisses; with the similarities, they soon realize it is possible that they met each other many years ago.
| 24 | 2 | "It Happened One Summer: Part 2" | Asaad Kelada | Martin Cohan & Blake Hunter | October 1, 1985 | 0206 | 22.0/34 |
Tony and Angela head to the place in the woods that each remember from their past, when a thunderstorm moves in. Tony and Angela are forced to stay in a motel room together when they can’t return to camp. Back at camp, the counselor is the victim of some pranks.
| 25 | 3 | "Ad Man Micelli" | Asaad Kelada | Robert Sternin & Prudence Fraser | October 8, 1985 | 0201 | 24.8/38 |
Samantha's first days at junior high are a bit harder than she imagines. She wants to be friends with the popular girls, but fears the truth will ruin her chances. Samantha leads her friends to believe that Tony is the executive in the advertising firm and owns Angela's house.
| 26 | 4 | "The Heiress" | Gary Brown | Alan L. Gansberg | October 15, 1985 | 0207 | 22.4/35 |
Mona's past comes calling when a stranger leaves her some money in his will. Once Mona realises the man is a former lover, she has no desire to keep the money. Fran Drescher guest stars as Mona's interior decorator.
| 27 | 5 | "Tony the Matchmaker" | Asaad Kelada | Paul Robinson Hunter | October 29, 1985 | 0204 | 20.4/31 |
Tony talks Angela into going out with his friend Wally, who is recently single. After their date, Angela does not care to see Wally again, that is until Mona goes out on a date with him. Wally's attention is the focus of this mother-daughter battle.
| 28 | 6 | "Custody: Part 1" | Asaad Kelada | Robert Sternin & Prudence Fraser | November 5, 1985 | 0210 | 20.7/31 |
Angela's ex-husband, Michael, returns with his new wife-to-be and invites the whole family to California for his wedding. Jonathan really likes his future stepmother and is soaking up the sun, which leads Michael to want custody of Jonathan.
| 29 | 7 | "Custody: Part 2" | Asaad Kelada | Robert Sternin & Prudence Fraser | November 12, 1985 | 0211 | 21.2/31 |
Everyone is preparing for the wedding, while Michael and Angela prepare for a custody battle. Not long into it Angela is ready to give up, but a messy situation makes Michael and Heather realize they are not equipped to be custodial parents.
| 30 | 8 | "Hunk of the Month" | Michael Zinberg | Karen Wengrod & Ken Cinnmaon | November 19, 1985 | 0208 | 20.6/30 |
Tony does a photo shoot for a calendar, when a woman starts to show some affection Angela begins to show signs of jealousy. However her view is changed when one of the other guys takes a liking to her.
| 31 | 9 | "Thanksgiving at Mrs. Rossini's" | Asaad Kelada | Dawn Aldredge & Judith Bustany | November 26, 1985 | 0202 | 20.8/30 |
The family heads back to Brooklyn for Thanksgiving at Mrs. Rossini's. Here it is customary for the woman to wait on the man, which irritates Angela, who is even less thrilled when a young girl takes a romantic liking to Tony.
| 32 | 10 | "The Prodigal Father-in-Law" | Asaad Kelada | Cheri Eichen & Bill Steinkellner | December 3, 1985 | 0203 | 17.2/25 |
Samantha's grandfather has been denied parole, so he escapes. Before he can run from the law, he must talk with his granddaughter who won’t speak to him.
| 33 | 11 | "The Graduate" | Asaad Kelada | Bud Wiser | December 10, 1985 | 0209 | 18.7/29 |
Mona has just graduated from college and is asked to help bring down a company which is being accused of discrimination. Mona is asked to apply for a job, which she should be turned down for...but Angela pulls a few strings and messes up the undercover assignment.
| 34 | 12 | "Tony the Nanny" | Katherine Helmond & Gail L. Bergmann | Ellen Guylas | December 17, 1985 | 0214 | 20.4/32 |
A marriage has been arranged and one of Tony's cousins is the bride. She comes to town to meet her soon-to-be husband, who is a male chauvinist. Tony is disgusted by the man and forbids him to marry his cousin. This makes her father angry, so he flies in to take this up with Tony one-on-one.
| 35 | 13 | "Junior Executive" | Tony Danza & Gail L. Bergmann | Cheri Eichen & Bill Steinkellner | January 7, 1986 | 0212 | 23.3/34 |
Samantha needs money so she can be more involved with activities for her drill team. So Angela decides to bring Samantha in to work in her office on Saturdays, but soon Samantha realizes by working she is missing out on all the activities. So Samantha schemes to get fired by deliberately being incompetent and doing a poor job so that she can retain her weekend freedom.
| 36 | 14 | "Educating Tony" | Asaad Kelada | Michael Poryes | January 14, 1986 | 0217 | 20.8/30 |
Tony is taking an advertising class and it just so happens that Angela is the teacher. Angela gives the class their first assignment, to come up with an ad for laundry detergent. Angela can't stand Tony's ad, so she gives him an "F".
| 37 | 15 | "Gotta Dance" | Asaad Kelada | Howard Meyers | January 21, 1986 | 0216 | 21.3/32 |
Tony decides to sign Samantha up for ballet lessons. When the instructor compliments her work and potential, Tony is proud. However, it is possible that the compliment is not what it seemed.
| 38 | 16 | "The Babysitter" | Asaad Kelada | Bud Wiser | January 28, 1986 | 0218 | 23.6/34 |
When their sitter cancels at the last minute, Tony and Angela are forced to have Samantha watch Jonathan while they attend a meeting at school. Jonathan loses a piece of jewelry down a drain, and soon the house is full of people, against Tony's wishes.
| 39 | 17 | "Jonathan Plays Cupid" | Asaad Kelada | Paul Robinson Hunter | February 11, 1986 | 0215 | 20.8/30 |
It is Valentine's Day and Jonathan has realized, with the help of a friend, that one day Tony may not be around anymore. Jonathan decides to arrange a dinner for Tony and Angela signing on ‘Mr. Bower’ which leads both Tony and Angela to think it is Angela's ex-husband.
| 40 | 18 | "When Worlds Collide" | Asaad Kelada | Karen Wengrod & Ken Cinnamon | February 18, 1986 | 0219 | 22.3/33 |
Tony is having his monthly poker game night. Angela is expecting a friend over for breakfast the next day, and as Tony rushes to take his friend to the train station he winds up leaving as Angela's arrives. Opposites attract as these two hook up.
| 41 | 19 | "Losers and Other Strangers" | Asaad Kelada | Seth Weisbord | February 25, 1986 | 0220 | 19.4/29 |
Tony's bowling skills have landed him a trophy, which he is very proud of. However, when Angela comes home after not winning her award, Tony's excitement is cut short.
| 42 | 20 | "Tony for President" | Asaad Kelada | Howard Meyers | March 4, 1986 | 0221 | 21.6/34 |
Tony is running for PTA president, but his opponent turns his campaign into a mudslinging match. Flustered, Tony tries to explain the circumstances of her accusations.
| 43 | 21 | "Not With My Client, You Don't" | Asaad Kelada | Dawn Aldredge & Judith Bustany | March 18, 1986 | 0222 | 24.3/38 |
One of Angela's clients decides to send his daughter to take care of his business in the United States. While there the daughter meets Tony and he agrees to show her around. Angela begins to think she has pushed this woman onto Tony, she decides to break them up.
| 44 | 22 | "Angela's New Best Friend" | Asaad Kelada | Story by : Cheri Eichen & Bill Steinkellner; Teleplay by : Carrie Honigblum & Michele Buehler Glazer & Renee Phillips | March 25, 1986 | 0223 | 22.6/36 |
Diane (Marilu Henner), Tony and Angela's very annoying neighbor, needs a place to stay, so they invite her to say at Angela's house. She wears out her welcome quickly, while trying to deal with her husband leaving her for the maid and makes a play for Tony in the process. Note: Tony Danza and Marilu Henner co-starred on the sitcom Taxi from 1978 through 1983.
| 45 | 23 | "There's No Business Like Shoe Business" | Asaad Kelada | Karen Wengrod & Ken Cinnamon | April 1, 1986 | 0224 | 22.4/35 |
Mona offers some advice to a colleague, who is bored with his life. Mona discovers he has taken her advice too far when he leaves his wife and family to search for a Hollywood dream.
| 46 | 24 | "The Unnatural" | Jim Drake | Ellen Guylas | April 8, 1986 | 0213 | 22.9/35 |
When an old baseball friend of Tony's shows up it is not long before they are competing. They are out to see who is the better coach, with Angela in the middle. She starts out on Tony's team and soon ends up playing against Tony when he asks her to do the impossible: hit the ball.
| 47 | 25 | "The Anniversary Show" | Asaad Kelada | Robert Sternin & Prudence Fraser and Ellen Guylas | May 6, 1986 | 0225 | 19.6/35 |
It has been two years since Tony and Samantha came to Connecticut, and Angela is planning a special dinner. What started out as dinner for 5 ends up with Tony in the hospital. Once sedated, he mutters "I love you" to Angela.
| 48 | 26 | "Charmed Lives" | Asaad Kelada | Story by : Paul Haggis and Eve Brandstein & Peter Marc; Teleplay by : Paul Haggis | May 13, 1986 | 0226 | 18.8/33 |
Angela is doing a series of pasta commercials for a client. She believes she has found the perfect person for the part, but to Angela's dismay, the client chooses a shy, blond photographer who is only taking the job because she needs the cash. The episode was a backdoor pilot for a possible spin-off series, but did not sell.

=== Season 3 (1986–87) ===
| No. overall | No. in season | Title | Directed by | Written by | Original release date | Prod. code | Rating/share (households) |
|---|---|---|---|---|---|---|---|
| 49 | 1 | "Angela Gets Fired: Part 1" | Asaad Kelada | Howard Meyers | September 23, 1986 | 0304 | 21.8/36 |
Overworked Angela goes to Mexico with the family, but when Angela's business loses an important account, Tony fails to give Angela the message. When Angela comes home, she goes to the agency to learn that they lost the account. After sassing to her boss and telling him to chill, Angela loses her job.
| 50 | 2 | "Angela Gets Fired: Part 2" | Asaad Kelada | Karen Wengrod & Ken Cinnamon | September 30, 1986 | 0305 | 22.5/36 |
Angela tries desperately to find a new job but none of her old friends or partners has one for her. The only job she can find is as a low-paid copy writer. Eventually, Tony and Mona convince her to open her own agency.
| 51 | 3 | "Daddy's Little Montague Girl" | Asaad Kelada | Tom Seeley & Norm Gunzenhauser | October 21, 1986 | 0301 | 21.1/32 |
Marci applies for the elite school Montague. Sam also wants to do so and finds an advocate in Angela, a Montague Academy graduate. But Tony doesn't like the idea of Sam visiting a school so far away.
| 52 | 4 | "Mona's Limo" | Asaad Kelada | Story by : Michele Buehler Glazer; Teleplay by : Carrie Honigblum & Renee Phillips | October 28, 1986 | 0311 | 22.0/34 |
Angela's new business is struggling, thanks in part to the new president of her former agency, who is employing some dirty tricks to steal her clientele. Mona tries to boost business by chauffeuring clients in a private limousine.
| 53 | 5 | "The Hickey" | Asaad Kelada | Jan Worthington | November 4, 1986 | 0302 | 21.1/31 |
Samantha unsuccessfully tries to hide from Tony the hickey her boyfriend gave her. He tries to warn her about how teenage boys can be manipulative with girls, and she later finds that her boyfriend is saying some of the same things Tony warned her about.
| 54 | 6 | "Wedding Bells?" | Asaad Kelada | Ellen Guylas | November 11, 1986 | 0306 | 25.2/38 |
Samantha's friend's father is getting married. While at the wedding, Tony and Angela both secretly fantasize about marrying each other.
| 55 | 7 | "Jonathan the Gymnast" | Asaad Kelada | Story by : Carrie Honigblum & Michele Buehler Glazer & Renee Phillips; Teleplay by : Steve Curwick | November 18, 1986 | 0307 | 21.7/33 |
Jonathan, because he takes life too seriously, should find a hobby besides studying. He decides to take up gymnastics, with Tony teaching him. During a competition, he falls due to his overzealousness and breaks his shoulder, which Angela really isn't happy about.
| 56 | 8 | "Semi-Private Lives" | Asaad Kelada | Karen Wengrod & Ken Cinnamon | November 25, 1986 | 0308 | 21.9/33 |
Angela goes to Maine for the weekend with her boyfriend Geoffrey. Tony, now alone at home – the kids are on a school trip to Washington, D.C. – invites his old flame Tanya. However, due to heavy snowfall, Angela and Geoffrey can't make it to Maine and return unexpectedly.
| 57 | 9 | "Forgive Me, Tony" | Tony Danza & Gail L. Bergmann | Story by : Shelley Karol & Robert Bruce & Martin Weiss; Teleplay by : Shelley Karol | December 2, 1986 | 0310 | 20.8/30 |
Sam has had a big argument with Bonnie. Tony wants to see them both together again, but Sam will only agree if he makes it up with his old nemesis from high school, Mickey. Therefore Tony invites Mickey - who in the meantime has become a priest. But when Tony annoys and teases him too much, Mickey strikes a blow.
| 58 | 10 | "Spud Micelli" | Asaad Kelada | Alan Mandel | December 9, 1986 | 0312 | 19.5/30 |
Samantha and her boyfriend Todd each try out for their basketball teams at school. When Samantha makes her team, but Todd doesn't, his ego is crushed, and he is not interested in going to watch her team play. His disappointment makes Samantha consider dropping off her team. Meanwhile, Tony and Angela have a heated competition in a game of miniature golf.
| 59 | 11 | "The Christmas Card" | Asaad Kelada | Mindy Glazer | December 16, 1986 | 0309 | 22.8/35 |
As Tony doesn't want to sell his only 'Tony Micelli Baseball card', he tells Dr. Ferguson he has none. Angela, who has listened, now wants to get one for Tony. The dealer Angela has asked calls Tony shortly afterwards and offers him a lot of money, which he really could need to buy Angela a Christmas present.
| 60 | 12 | "The Way We Was" | Asaad Kelada | Ellen Guylas & Howard Meyers | January 6, 1987 | 0313 | 23.8/36 |
On a snowy day, the family reminisces about their situations before coming together: Tony made the decision to leave Brooklyn after he felt Samantha had been involved in too many fights. Angela was dissatisfied with her current housekeeper (Lu Leonard), and wanted to find a new one. Tony met Mona, who assured him he would get the job.
| 61 | 13 | "Jonathan Kills Tony" | Asaad Kelada | Story by : Carrie Honigblum; Teleplay by : Renee Phillips & Michele Buehler Glazer | January 13, 1987 | 0303 | 23.4/33 |
Jonathan starts seeing a girl named Jenny, but she is more interested in Tony. Feeling betrayed, Jonathan is determined on taking revenge on Tony.
| 62 | 14 | "Marie's Secret" | Asaad Kelada | Lawrence H. Levy | January 20, 1987 | 0314 | 24.2/35 |
While everyone is planning a surprise party for Tony, Tony starts suspecting his late wife had an affair during their marriage.
| 63 | 15 | "Tony, the Patchmaker" | Asaad Kelada | Karen Wengrod & Ken Cinnamon | January 27, 1987 | 0315 | 23.3/34 |
When Angela accidentally destroys her latest boyfriend Geoffrey's new expensive car, he immediately breaks off their relationship. However, he later regrets his decision and contacts Tony to help him win Angela back.
| 64 | 16 | "Hit the Road, Chad" | Asaad Kelada | Howard Meyers | February 3, 1987 | 0317 | 22.2/33 |
Samantha is excited when Ray Charles, Angela's latest client, wants to use a song Sam's boyfriend Chad wrote especially for her. That is, until she catches Chad cheating on her.
| 65 | 17 | "Raging Housekeeper" | Asaad Kelada | Dawn Aldredge & Judith Bustany | February 10, 1987 | 0318 | 22.1/33 |
With high expectations, Tony enters a boxing competition for charity, with Angela as his intimidating coach. Little does he know how professional the other contestants are.
| 66 | 18 | "The Proposal" | Asaad Kelada | Ellen Guylas | February 17, 1987 | 0316 | 21.8/32 |
Angela feels Geoffrey will propose to her and starts to doubt about whether she will accept or not. Mona and Tony both feel she deserves better.
| 67 | 19 | "Diet in Cell Block 11" | Asaad Kelada | Howard Meyers | February 24, 1987 | 0319 | 20.7/29 |
Recently released from jail, Nick comes for a visit and brings copies of his newly published cookbook, which he penned while imprisoned. Tony and Angela soon discover that the material in the book is plagiarized. NOTE: James Coco, who guest starred as Nick, died the day after this episode originally aired. The Season 4 episode "A Farewell to Nick" was produced in Coco's honor.
| 68 | 20 | "Older Than Springtime" | Tony Danza & Gail L. Bergmann | Alan Mandel | March 3, 1987 | 0320 | 24.7/37 |
Angela's new ad campaign has a youthful edge to it, and she begins to feel her years older. To make matters worse, Tony dates a much younger woman. To combat her feelings of inadequacy, she opts for a young and hip ad presentation.
| 69 | 21 | "Walk on the Mild Side" | Asaad Kelada | John Donley & Clay Graham | March 17, 1987 | 0322 | 23.9/36 |
Angela makes a list of wild things she wanted to do while in high school, and decides she will do them now. Tony and Mona help her fulfill her goals, but Tony becomes concerned when she dates the high school wild man, a motorcyclist named Jake "The Snake" McGuire. The date doesn't turn out Angela plans, so Tony comes to rescue her and they end up kissing in his van.
| 70 | 22 | "Reconcilable Differences" | Asaad Kelada | Story by : Mindy Glazer; Teleplay by : Ellen Guylas & Howard Meyers & Karen Wengrod & Ken Cinnamon & Alan Mandel & Mindy Glazer | March 31, 1987 | 0323 | 23.8/36 |
Tony has met Fiona at the dentist's and gotten her a job as secretary at Angela's agency. The tidy-minded perfectionist Fiona is Angela's dream, but also Mona's nightmare. After an argument between Mona and Angela, Fiona quits because she doesn't want to stand in the way of them both. But Mona quits, too.
| 71 | 23 | "Mona" | Asaad Kelada | Martin Cohan & Blake Hunter | May 12, 1987 | 0324 | 18.3/31 |
Mona goes to visit her brother who bought an old hotel using her money, and discovers that the place is a money pit. This episode was filmed as a backdoor pilot for a spin-off series of the same name, which never got off the ground.
| 72 | 24 | "A Moving Episode" | Asaad Kelada | Karen Wengrod & Ken Cinnamon | May 19, 1987 | 0321 | 19.2/32 |
When Mona moves to New York, Tony takes over her apartment. While trying to convince his friends from the old neighborhood and himself that he's still the wild man he once was, Tony discovers that he's happier in his domestic role with Angela and the kids.

=== Season 4 (1987–88) ===
| No. overall | No. in season | Title | Directed by | Written by | Original release date | Prod. code | Rating/share (households) |
|---|---|---|---|---|---|---|---|
| 73 | 1 | "Frankie and Tony are Lovers" | Asaad Kelada | Karen Wengrod & Ken Cinnamon | September 22, 1987 | 0403 | 23.4/39 |
The whole family heads to Brooklyn for a street fair. Tony runs into his old friend Frankie, the only girl in the neighborhood that would not go out with him in high school. At the street fair, Tony is auctioned off for his housekeeping services to make money for the neighborhood. It becomes a bidding war between Angela and Frankie, who bids $1,000 for Tony and takes him home to clean her house. While Tony is cleaning, Frankie proposes to Tony. Angela is upset about this proposal and goes to see a therapist, who asks if she loves Tony and Angela says that she is in love with him and he makes her happier than any other person.
| 74 | 2 | "Big Girl on Campus" | Asaad Kelada | Robert Walden | September 29, 1987 | 0402 | 24.0/39 |
Sam makes a date with a 15-year-old college student, without telling Tony. Tony bleeds Sam's friend Julia for what she knows about Sam's plans. He interrupts her study-date at the college library, and makes a big scene, humiliating Sam.
| 75 | 3 | "There Goes the Bride" | Asaad Kelada | John Donley & Clay Graham | October 6, 1987 | 0401 | 21.9/36 |
Angela and Tony play matchmaker with two shy friends of theirs, who hit it off and agree to get married. The wedding is set to take place at Angela's house, but guests are distracted by a hockey game on TV, causing the wedding plans to be altered.
| 76 | 4 | "A Trip to the Principal" | Asaad Kelada | John Donley & Clay Graham | October 13, 1987 | 0405 | 22.6/36 |
Jonathan's school tells Angela that he should skip the 6th grade and go to the 7th grade. The boys in the junior high are making his life miserable and stealing his lunch, so Jonathan changes his image to make friends and finds one that is a little bit punk. Angela is called to the principal's office because Jonathan and his friend have been terrorizing the school. The principal tells Angela that she has expectations for Jonathan that are too high for a child that just skipped a grade, she wants him to be popular and have a lot of friends, and he is just trying to please her. Jonathan chooses to stay in 7th grade, even though Angela would let him go back to 6th.
| 77 | 5 | "New Kid in Town" | Asaad Kelada | Howard Meyers & Susan Meyers | October 27, 1987 | 0411 | 23.7/36 |
Sam is upset over being dateless for the dance. Tony leaves to the supermarket and there meets an environmentally conscious and sweet boy named Jesse Nash (Scott Bloom), cheerfully working the produce section. Convinced this is the boy for Sam, he brings the boy home, only to find Sam has already rounded up an emergency date. Courteous, Jesse says he doesn't mind, but as he is attracted to Sam, he doesn't want her going out with another boy, and deviously, using his uncanny persuasiveness and environmentally evoked guilt, he manipulates Sam's date into not taking her to the dance. Furious, Sam demands Jesse leave, whilst Jesse is only amused. The next day when Jesse comes over to see her, much to her annoyance, Sam refuses to see him but Tony insists she be polite. Still bemused Jesses insists she need calm down, and suggests some Yoga-inspired deep breathing. When Jesse finally does kiss Sam, Tony has no reaction to the kiss.
| 78 | 6 | "Two on a Billboard" | Asaad Kelada | Jeffrey Duteil | November 3, 1987 | 0407 | 22.1/34 |
In a publicity stunt to encourage children to read, Tony lives on a billboard for 48 hours. The ensuing media attention lands him a very attractive job offer.
| 79 | 7 | "A Farewell to Nick" | Asaad Kelada | Lee Aronsohn & Marc Sheffler | November 10, 1987 | 0406 | 23.4/36 |
Sam is invited by her grandfather to visit him in Florida. But on her way there, Nick dies. Sam initially tries to pay no attention to this, but Nick's death left big marks on her.
| 80 | 8 | "Hell on Wheels" | Gail L. Bergmann | Matt Geller | November 17, 1987 | 0409 | 22.1/35 |
Tony gets no help when Angela decides to help out with the housework after putting Tony in a wheelchair with a sprained ankle and a broken leg.
| 81 | 9 | "A Fishy Tale" | Asaad Kelada | Dawn Aldredge & Brian Brock | November 24, 1987 | 0413 | 20.7/32 |
Mrs. Rossini is devastated after her husband has left her. Tony pitches in to help her run their fish market, but the work, coupled with the search for a capable new employee, soon becomes too much for Tony.
| 82 | 10 | "Car and Driver" | Asaad Kelada | Story by : Paul Chitlik & Jeremy Bertand Finch; Teleplay by : John Donley & Clay Graham | December 1, 1987 | 0414 | 21.3/33 |
Sam and Jesse are out delivering lasagna to the elderly when Jesse lets Sam drive the van and they get hit by another car. Angela and Tony try to get the boys' license taken away for hitting Sam, because Tony does not know that it was Sam driving the car who does not have a license.
| 83 | 11 | "Just Mona and Me" | Asaad Kelada | Mindy Glazer | December 8, 1987 | 0408 | 20.3/32 |
One of Angela's clients (played by Leslie Nielsen) is more interested in Mona than in Angela's presentation. Their romance appears to be going well, but just before they are to take a cruise together, he calls and cancels the trip and the relationship with no explanation. Tony and Angela decide to investigate and are surprised at what they learn.
| 84 | 12 | "Yellow Submarine" | Asaad Kelada | Robin Pennington | December 15, 1987 | 0404 | 17.2/26 |
Tony gets a job at the coolest place in the mall and hires Sam as a waitress, but when Tony kicks out the coolest boys, he loses all the customers and the owner asks Sam to fire Tony.
| 85 | 13 | "Another Single Parent" | Asaad Kelada | Glenn Padnick | January 5, 1988 | 0410 | 22.1/32 |
Mona is off to a murder mystery weekend. A woman named Kelly (D.D. Howard), whose husband recently died and has a daughter named Melissa (Jessica Player), moves into the neighborhood. Kelly is a sports nut and she invites Tony to a few sporting events, but Tony has no feelings for her. Angela is roped into babysitting when Samantha gets invited to a U2 concert in the middle of her duties. When Angela is babysitting, Melissa tells her that her dad called one day and her mother would not let her talk to him, and the next day they moved. Angela and Tony start to suspect that Kelly might have stolen Melissa from him. Kelly divorced her husband, and it was a very rough custody battle during which she gave up her parental rights, but she decided that she could not live without her and stole her back.
| 86 | 14 | "All in the Famiglia" | Asaad Kelada | Story by : John Donley & Clay Graham & Maurizio Bizzarri; Teleplay by : John Donley & Clay Graham | January 12, 1988 | 0416 | 22.5/33 |
Tony's family comes to visit from Italy, and Angela tries really hard to impress them. Tony's Aunt Rosa (Antonia Rey) says that he is stupid for never being with Angela and that they should get married. Tony's cousin Maritzio (Richard Grieco) proposes to Angela.
| 87 | 15 | "Steady as She Goes" | Asaad Kelada | Joe Fisch | January 19, 1988 | 0415 | 22.1/32 |
Samantha accepts when Jesse asks her to go steady. However, she soon feels that her dedication to him is taking away from spending time with the other guy in her life: Tony.
| 88 | 16 | "Tony and the Dreamtones" | Asaad Kelada | Karen Wengrod & Ken Cinnamon | February 2, 1988 | 0417 | 22.3/32 |
Tony's old singing group comes to Connecticut to ask him to sing one more time with them, for charity. When Tony hears Angela sing, he asks the group to let her sing with them, but they say no.
| 89 | 17 | "The Matriculator" | Asaad Kelada | Lee Aronsohn & Marc Sheffler | February 9, 1988 | 0418 | 22.6/33 |
In an attempt to spark Samantha's interest in pursuing higher education, Tony gets bitten by the academic bug himself, and decides to become a college student. But he begins to have doubts as to whether he is up to the challenge.
| 90 | 18 | "Three Teens and a Tony" | Asaad Kelada | Claylene Jones | March 1, 1988 | 0423 | 22.0/33 |
While Jesse is away, Sam's friend, Mason, is staying at the Bowers' house. After spending an evening with him, Sam kisses him, and then worries about confessing to Jesse when he returns.
| 91 | 19 | "Housekeepers Unite" | James Eric Hornbeck | John Donley & Clay Graham | March 15, 1988 | 0420 | 22.3/34 |
The housekeepers in the neighborhood go on strike.
| 92 | 20 | "Model Daughter" | Asaad Kelada | Danny Kallis | March 22, 1988 | 0422 | 21.8/34 |
Tony doesn't approve of Sam being a model.
| 93 | 21 | "Marry Me, Mona" | Asaad Kelada | Howard Meyers & Ken Cinnamon & Karen Wengrod & Joe Fisch | March 29, 1988 | 0419 | 22.0/35 |
Max proposes marriage to Mona, but she turns him down, claiming she likes things the way they are. But Max doesn't give up—he makes a number of attempts to change Mona's mind. She finally does say yes, but only after Max's ex-wife surprises him with a visit. Angela worries that Mona's change of decision is for the wrong reason.
| 94 | 22 | "Prom Night II" | Asaad Kelada | Diana M. Ayers & Susan Sebastian | May 3, 1988 | 0421 | 18.7/32 |
Jesse asks Sam to go with him to the prom. Angela takes cares of Sam and overdoes it because she wants Sam having the prom night she herself never had. But after all the interferences, Sam refuses to go.
| 95 | 23 | "Sleep Talk, Sweet Talk" | Asaad Kelada | Ken Cinnamon & Karen Wengrod | May 10, 1988 | 0412 | 18.3/33 |
Angela is talking in her sleep and is calling out Tony's name. Angela's sleep talking is waking everyone up, and when everyone is gathered outside her door, she says that she is in love with Tony.
| 96 | 24 | "The Two Tonys" | Asaad Kelada | Gene Braunstein & Bob Perlow | May 17, 1988 | 0424 | 16.6/30 |
Tony and Angela run into a woman he knew from the old neighborhood. She is now married to an arrogant, extremely competitive businessman named Tony, who challenges Tony to a serious game of pool.

=== Season 5 (1988–89) ===
| No. overall | No. in season | Title | Directed by | Written by | Original release date | Prod. code | U.S. viewers (millions) | Rating/share (households) |
|---|---|---|---|---|---|---|---|---|
| 97 | 1 | "Sam's Car" | Asaad Kelada | Bob Perlow & Gene Braunstein | October 18, 1988 | 0501 | 32.7 | 21.8/34 |
Sam gets her license and Tony gives her own set of keys to his van. Meanwhile, Bonnie's father buys her a brand new car, which she wastes no time in wrecking. Tony then buys Sam a used car, but the car looks like a boat: huge, yellow and has red lights attached all around it. Sam is embarrassed by the car, as the other kids at school are teasing her about it but she is afraid to tell her father. The car gets stolen when Sam parks it far from the school. Angela finds out about how Sam really feels about her car and tells her to speak with Tony. She doesn't, and when a policeman (Garrett Morris) comes to the house claiming to have found the car, Sam must now explain to her father the real reason why the car was stolen.
| 98 | 2 | "My Fair Tony" | Asaad Kelada | David Lesser | October 25, 1988 | 0503 | 28.2 | 19.2/30 |
Tony takes a speech class with a very tough instructor, who makes Tony realize that his normal way of speaking is wrong in many ways. After adopting proper diction, Tony soon begins to realize that the course has changed more than just his vocabulary.
| 99 | 3 | "Nineteen Again" | Asaad Kelada | John Donley & Clay Graham | November 1, 1988 | 0502 | 33.8 | 22.3/34 |
Tony decides to join a fraternity, but when Angela gets drunk and mouths off to the dean, the fraternity loses their money.
| 100 | 4 | "Yankee Doodle Micelli" | Asaad Kelada | Karen Wengrod & Ken Cinnamon | November 22, 1988 | 0504 | 27.9 | 18.3/29 |
Angela and the gang are cleaning out the attic. Angela accidentally throws out some old Yoo-Hoo bottle caps, thinking they were garbage. But to Tony, they are a cherised memento of his late grandfather. Tony explains that he really didn't like his grandfather at first when he came to help his dad soon after his mother had died, but when he taught Tony how to tap dance with those bottle caps, he began to have a better relationship with him. Tony also relates a few years later that because he had gotten into trouble with the police for stealing a street sign, his grandfather had to miss his U.S. citizen swearing-in ceremony and died before he could attend the next one. Now Tony wants to do something special for his grandfather, so he goes and sees a judge, asking him if he could posthumously swear in his grandfather, with Tony taking his place. The judge agrees, and Tony's grandfather finally becomes a U.S. citizen.
| 101 | 5 | "A Jack Story" | Asaad Kelada | Joe Fisch | November 29, 1988 | 0505 | 30.0 | 19.9/30 |
Angela hires a new creative director for the Bower Agency, Jack (David Paymer). He and Angela start working very late each night to get some of their ideas off the ground. Tony begins to get jealous and suspects Jack of trying to take the agency away from Angela. They have a big presentation in the morning and have decided to work through the night in a hotel room at the Plaza hotel in order to get ready for it. Tony uses the pretense of delivering Angela's notebook to check up on them, and he finds a reassuring surprise.
| 102 | 6 | "Double Dump" | Asaad Kelada | Eric Gilliland | December 6, 1988 | 0506 | 32.0 | 20.3/32 |
Sam is excited that her boyfriend, Jesse (Scott Bloom), will be returning home from his boat trip and will be stopping by to visit her. Mona is going on another date with Max. When Jesse finally sees Sam, he tells her that he met someone else during his trip and that he will be breaking up with Sam. At the same time, Mona is dumped by Max. Both ladies are hurt and angry and can't stop thinking about their men, but after a night out, they lean on each other for comfort and consolation.
| 103 | 7 | "Life with Father" | Asaad Kelada | Ken Cinnamon & Karen Wengrod & Danny Kallis | December 13, 1988 | 0509 | 33.2 | 21.3/33 |
Bonnie wants Sam to join her for a weekend at a cabin in Vermont, but Tony forbids Sam to go when he learns there will be minimal adult supervision. Sam sneaks out and goes anyway. This episode is a clip show of previous episodes.
| 104 | 8 | "A Spirited Christmas" | Asaad Kelada | Dawn Aldredge & Marion C. Freeman | December 20, 1988 | 0510 | 32.0 | 20.1/33 |
The wife of Mona's brother has died. But before she can go to heaven, she must make Mona reconcile with her brother, and Tony is picked out as the mediator. Guest cast: Christina Pickles as Laura, I.M. Hobson as St. Peter, and Gordon Jump as Archie
| 105 | 9 | "Teacher's Pet" | Asaad Kelada | John Donley & Clay Graham | January 3, 1989 | 0508 | 33.3 | 21.7/32 |
Mason teaches Tony's class and pays special attention to him.
| 106 | 10 | "Mrs. Rossini's Uncle" | Asaad Kelada | Lee Aronsohn | January 10, 1989 | 0511 | 33.6 | 22.5/34 |
Mrs. Rossini's young uncle Al falls for Sam, but Tony doesn't approve.
| 107 | 11 | "Your Grandmother's a Bimbo" | Asaad Kelada | Bud Wiser | January 24, 1989 | 0507 | 35.6 | 22.9/35 |
Angela's client publishes a senior citizens magazine. Mona steps into the ad meeting and suggests the editors update the magazine by using more hip and modern articles, as well as advertising that caters to their more mature demographics. Mona then poses for the revamped magazine's new cover in sexy lingerie. During the same time at the house when Mona is showing the proofs, Jonathan is trying to get elected school treasurer and during his campaign meeting, some of the students from his school see the photo. The next day, Jonathan comes home with a black eye because he was fighting with the other kids who were calling Mona a bimbo. He is so angry that he tells Mona that she has messed everything up for him and never wants to see her again.
| 108 | 12 | "Ton-An Enterprises" | Tony Danza & Phil Squyres | John Donley & Clay Graham | January 31, 1989 | 0513 | 33.4 | 22.1/34 |
Angela and Tony go into business at a craft fair selling tie-dyed T-shirts. Differences of sales techniques soon have them splitting their merchandise and competing against each other.
| 109 | 13 | "Cardinal Sin" | Asaad Kelada | Gene Braunstein & Bob Perlow | February 7, 1989 | 0512 | 34.6 | 22.3/34 |
Tony goes to an 'Old Timer'-meeting of the St. Louis Cardinals, accompanied by Angela. There Tony meets also his old friend Betty. But to prevent flirtation attempts, he introduces Angela as his wife. When things don't turn out as planned, Angela kicks Tony out of their room. After a long night, Angela kisses Tony after she finds out the truth.
| 110 | 14 | "Winter Break" | Asaad Kelada | Howard Jay Smith | February 14, 1989 | 0514 | 29.8 | 19.5/31 |
Sam accompanies Tony on a ski trip. Tony spends most of his time with an attractive ski instructor, and Sam begins to feel ignored. Meanwhile, at home, Angela and Mona suffer from a bad case of the flu, leaving Jonathan to be man of the house.
| 111 | 15 | "First Date" | Asaad Kelada | Daniel Palladino | February 21, 1989 | 0515 | 35.1 | 21.9/33 |
After Mona finds out that Angela hired an escort to take her to an awards ceremony, she convinces Tony to ask her out on a date to build up her confidence.
| 112 | 16 | "Party Double" | Asaad Kelada | Karen Wengrod & Ken Cinnamon & Danny Kallis & Joe Fisch | February 28, 1989 | 0516 | 34.1 | 21.6/33 |
Tony and Mona crashes a party attended by Frank Sinatra.
| 113 | 17 | "Boozin' Buddies" | Asaad Kelada | Claylene Jones | March 7, 1989 | 0517 | 35.3 | 22.8/34 |
When Sam comes home drunk, Tony tries to stop drinking to show her that you don't have to drink to have fun.
| 114 | 18 | "Heather Can Wait" | Asaad Kelada | Don Segall & Phil Margo | March 21, 1989 | 0518 | 33.3 | 21.8/34 |
The neighbors' antics disenchant Tony and Angela.
| 115 | 19 | "Living Dolls" | John Sgueglia | Ross Brown | March 28, 1989 | 0522 | 29.3 | 19.7/31 |
As a school project, Sam visits a modeling school run by Angela's friend. While there, she meets Charlie, a friend of hers from the old neighborhood, who is living there. Charlie is unhappy with her life there, and is considering running away. This episode served as the basis for a short-lived spin-off series, Living Dolls. Guest Stars: Leah Remini as Charlie, Michael Learned as Trish Carlin, Alison Elliott as Martha Lambert, Vivica A. Fox as Emily Franklin, Melissa Willis as Caroline Weldon, Jonathan Ward as Rick Carlin, Rick Giolito as Joe, Eddy Nix as Mike Calaboni and Bobby Brett as Ike Calaboni.
| 116 | 20 | "Men are People, Too" | Asaad Kelada | Eric Gilliland | April 4, 1989 | 0519 | 27.4 | 18.4/31 |
Angela hires a shy contractor to put a skylight in the kitchen. He takes an immediate liking to Mona, who agrees to go out with him. When he learns that he is not the only man in Mona's life, he abandons the skylight job. Tony accuses Mona of having no respect for men's feelings.
| 117 | 21 | "Working Girls" | Frank Bonner | Jake Weinberger & Mike Weinberger | April 11, 1989 | 0520 | 28.4 | 19.4/32 |
Tony sets up a work partnership program with some of the other parents in the community. The kids at the high school get a week off of school and they get to go shadow and work with members of the community. Samantha chooses Tony, and Bonnie is paired with Angela. Bonnie is doing very well and even gets to incorporate an idea she had into the files at Angela's office, and Samantha is hating it. Samantha starts to get jealous of Bonnie spending so much time with Angela, so Samantha trades Bonnie jobs in exchange for use of her leather jacket. While Samantha is at the office, the day is much more hectic than the day that Bonnie had and Sam wants to switch jobs again. She finally confesses to Angela that she thought that she liked Bonnie better, but Angela tells her that she does like Bonnie, but she loves Sam. Samantha tells Angela that she loves her like a mother.
| 118 | 22 | "Tony Does Golf" | Asaad Kelada | Bob Perlow & Gene Braunstein | April 25, 1989 | 0523 | 24.5 | 17.3/30 |
Tony has a new passion: golfing. Angela wins a country club membership for Tony, where he meets the owner of the biggest nationwide sporting goods store, who's currently giving away a big account. And of course, Angela's after this account, too.
| 119 | 23 | "Ode to Angela" | Asaad Kelada | Daniel Palladino | May 2, 1989 | 0521 | 25.6 | 17.9/30 |
Angela's old college sweetheart comes back into town. It turns out that they were married in Las Vegas when they were in college. Brian went to Mexico to have it annulled, but it was not legalized. While Brian is in town to have Angela sign the new papers so he can marry his fiancée Rhoda, he falls back in love with her.
| 120 | 24 | "In Sam We Trust" | Asaad Kelada | David Lesser | May 9, 1989 | 0524 | 24.4 | 16.5/27 |
Sam is struggling at school with chemistry, while her friend is having difficulty with French. Just before the exam, he gets desperate and talks Sam into giving him the answers. Tony punishes her for doing this, but things get worse when, to thank her for helping him, Sam's friend gives her a crib sheet to use on her chemistry test. She decides not to use it, but still gets caught with it. Guest Stars: Kenneth Tigar, James Calvert, Shana Lane-Block and Richie Rosati.
| 121 | 25 | "It's Somebody's Birthday" | Asaad Kelada | Alan Mandel | May 16, 1989 | 0525 | 24.9 | 16.8/29 |
It is Tony's birthday and his car is operating poorly, so he goes out and finds a Jeep that he really likes. Angela tries to help Tony get the car and gets them to knock $1,000 off the price, but he doesn't buy it, as he could not bring himself to spend that much money. Angela ends up buying Tony the car for his birthday, but Tony refuses to accept it. Angela tells Tony that the gift is as much for him as for her. She needs him to have a reliable car, and they decide to split the payments 50-50. When Tony tries to sell the old van, he can't bring himself to sell it because it has too many memories. However, a young man comes to the house that reminds Tony of himself, so he sells him the van for $300. Guest Stars: Rhoda Gemignani, Stuart Pankin, Ron Karabatsos, Julie Payne, Craig Connor and Diane Michelle.

=== Season 6 (1989–90) ===
| No. overall | No. in season | Title | Directed by | Written by | Original release date | Prod. code | U.S. viewers (millions) |
|---|---|---|---|---|---|---|---|
| 122 | 1 | "In Search of Tony" | Asaad Kelada | Gene Braunstein & Bob Perlow | September 19, 1989 | 0601 | 30.2 |
The family heads to Jamaica on vacation. When they get to the island, Samantha wants to be cut loose and be able to have her own time, and Jonathan is out with a girl that does not speak any English. Mona is, as always, trolling for guys. Angela is trying to have the island experience, and goes skinny dipping but almost drowns. Tony gets mad that Angela is having more fun than he is. They both get involved in a dancing competition and they start to have fun together again. Angela lets Tony know that the best times in her life are with him and then they end up making out. Tony tells Angela that he has thought about them getting married.
| 123 | 2 | "Life's a Ditch" | Asaad Kelada | Ross Brown | September 26, 1989 | 0603 | 27.6 |
Sam's friend Charlie gets her into trouble when she convinces her to skip school. When Tony catches them, he calls Charlie's mother and she tells him to keep her. Guest Stars: Michael Learned as Trish Curtis, Leah Remini as Charlie Briscoe, Robert Briscoe Evans as Bill, ans Kenneth Hoyt as Eddie.
| 124 | 3 | "In Your Dreams" | Asaad Kelada | Daniel Palladino | October 3, 1989 | 0605 | 30.1 |
Angela feels out of place in Tony's old haunts. She later has a dream where she is pregnant and is married to Tony. Guest Stars: Rhoda Gemignani as Mrs. Rossini, Louis Mustillo as Dennis, Carol Ann Susi as Ginger and Valerie Perri as Lynn.
| 125 | 4 | "Sam's Novel Romance" | Asaad Kelada | Richard Albrecht & Casey Keller | October 10, 1989 | 0604 | 30.0 |
Samantha goes with Tony to the university bookstore and meets a handsome grad student. He invites her to his book reading, and she starts reading Wuthering Heights. Samantha falls for the grad student and starts picturing a life with him. She tell Angela about her feelings and Angela tells her to talk to Tony. Tony invites the grad student over to check him out, and it turns out that he is married. Guest Stars: Lou Liberatore as Andrew Booth, Shana Lane-Block as Bonnie, Eileen Seeley as Janet Booth, Tara Karsian as Student #1, Dan Stockenberg as Student #2, Richard Israel as Ethan and Jeff Benson as Bubba.
| 126 | 5 | "Tony and the Professor" | Asaad Kelada | Mindy Schneider | October 24, 1989 | 0608 | 28.4 |
Tony breaks a date, then learns she's his teacher. And when Tony gets a C on his paper, he thinks it's because he broke the date with her. Guest Stars: Dennis Burkley as Pee Wee, Christine Kellogg as Joan, Tory Polone as Lori, Debra Armani as Susan and Michelle Reese as Hostess.
| 127 | 6 | "Mother and Child Disunion" | Asaad Kelada | John Donley & Clay Graham | October 31, 1989 | 0602 | 23.9 |
When Angela decides to combine her company with someone else's, her partner tells her she has to fire Mona.
| 128 | 7 | "Sam Can Manage" | Asaad Kelada | Daniel Palladino | November 7, 1989 | 0607 | 27.6 |
Sam manages a rock group, but when Tony helps the band get a gig, she gets angry and tells him to let her do stuff on her own.
| 129 | 8 | "Supermom Burnout" | Asaad Kelada | Eric Gilliland | November 14, 1989 | 0609 | 27.8 |
Sam and Jonathan are fighting more and more, and Angela thinks that it is a classic case of sibling rivalry. Tony and Angela decide to take the family to see a therapist. The therapist has the family role-play each other; Tony is Angela, and Jonathan is Sam. The therapist tell the family that Sam and Jonathan are acting like regular siblings and are perfectly normal. While the family is with the therapist, Tony misses his history exam and freaks out, so the therapist recommends having more therapy to prevent burnout. Tony's therapist has him join the "supermom burnout" group, where he learns that he needs to take time for himself. Guest Stars: Allan Miller as Dr. Berl, Mariangela Pino as Polly, Kit McDonough as Rosey, Marilyn McIntyre as Sonja, Kathleen Coyne as Lisa and Lawrence Parks as The Distraught Man.
| 130 | 9 | "Sex, Lies and Exercise Tape" | Asaad Kelada | Seth Weisbord | November 21, 1989 | 0610 | 32.6 |
When Angela lies about having an affair with Tony to fit in with the cool girls at the health club, they become the talk of the health club. Guest Stars: Randee Heller as Carol, Mary Cadorette as Deb, Debra Stipe as Vickie, Sandra Kerns as Patti, Ralph P. Martin as Ernie and Brad Kepnik as Chuck.
| 131 | 10 | "To Tony, with Love" | Asaad Kelada | Clay Graham | November 28, 1989 | 0611 | 27.7 |
Teaching assistant Tony finds a career goal after teaching a third grader how to multiply.
| 132 | 11 | "The World Accordion to Jonathan" | Asaad Kelada | Bob Perlow & Gene Braunstein | December 5, 1989 | 0613 | 26.7 |
When Jonathan gets stuck with the accordion in the school band, Tony calls an old friend (Bobby Governale) to give him lessons.
| 133 | 12 | "Gambling Jag" | Asaad Kelada | David Nathaniel Titcher | December 12, 1989 | 0606 | 28.5 |
To cheer Mona up, Tony and Angela takes her to Atlantic City. But when Mona meets a smooth-talking man, she starts gambling and uses Angela's necklace and car to cover gambling debts. This prompts Angela to challenge him to a game of poker in hopes of winning them back. Guest Stars: Robert Culp as Jason, Ben Frank as Pit Boss, Tracy K. Shaffer as Roxy, Michael Forest as Croupier and David Patrick Wilson as Dean.
| 134 | 13 | "Sam Accelerates" | Asaad Kelada | Richard Albrecht & Casey Keller | January 2, 1990 | 0612 | 28.8 |
Sam is offered the chance to graduate early, but gives up the chance because she's scared Tony will be all alone after she leaves.
| 135 | 14 | "Tony Kills" | Asaad Kelada | Clay Graham | January 9, 1990 | 0614 | 27.9 |
Tony believes he has killed his arrogant tennis partner Fred on the courts after he makes an unwanted pass at Angela. Fred's twin brother Ed then shows up and when he also makes a pass at Angela, Tony throws him out of the house and challenges him to a tennis match.
| 136 | 15 | "Dear Landlord" | Asaad Kelada | Daniel Palladino | January 16, 1990 | 0616 | 27.7 |
Angela needs to invest her money so she decides to buy a house that is up for sale in the neighborhood. Tony is the superintendent of the property and will take care of all of the repairs for the renters. Angela and Tony decide on a renter that is an older man, then Angela leaves for her business trip and Tony meets Michelle and rents her the house. Angela comes home from her business trip and is mad that Tony gave the house to a pretty model and lowered the rent. When she moves in, her rent check bounces and Angela tells Tony to kick her out, but Tony says that Angela is just jealous of Michelle. Guest Stars: Sherilyn Wolter as Michelle, Ralph P. Martin as Ernie, David Sage as Don Lester and Dan Gilvezan as Russ.
| 137 | 16 | "Mona & Walter & Sam & Eric" | Asaad Kelada | Gene Braunstein & Bob Perlow | January 23, 1990 | 0615 | 30.1 |
In order to spend time with her boyfriend, Sam sets his grandfather up with Mona, when they meet they realize they were engaged 40 years ago and she broke it off when she saw him flirting with another woman, however she hides a secret of her own.
| 138 | 17 | "Micelli's Marauders" | Asaad Kelada | Adam I. Lapidus | January 30, 1990 | 0617 | 28.1 |
Tony becomes a volleyball coach and he advises everyone but Angela.
| 139 | 18 | "Her Father's Daughter" | Tony Danza & Gail L. Kennedy | Toni Perling | February 6, 1990 | 0618 | 29.2 |
Tony and Angela are chaperones on Sam's spring break vacation to Ft. Lauderdale. Two guys hit on Sam and Bonnie, and Sam suspects the boys plan to move too fast. When Sam tries to warn Bonnie, Bonnie accuses her of being too motherly, and they end up fighting. Meanwhile, back at home, Mona helps Jonathan find a date.
| 140 | 19 | "Take Me Back to the Ballgame" | Asaad Kelada | Sheldon Krasner & David Saling | February 13, 1990 | 0619 | 25.8 |
A client of Angela's, a baseball player, upsets Tony when he demonstrates that he is only in baseball for the money and the fame. Tony wonders whatever happened to pride in the game. Guest star: Tommy Lasorda.
| 141 | 20 | "I Dream of Genealogy" | Asaad Kelada | Clay Graham | February 20, 1990 | 0620 | 27.0 |
After researching her family tree, Sam discovers that her great-grandfather, assumed to be deceased, is still alive in Italy. He is flown to Connecticut to meet the family, but Tony soon discovers that the man is not who they believe he is. Guest Stars: George Petrie as Grandpa Romano, Naomi Serotoff as Mrs. Rose Laudicina, Mary Betten as Mrs. Anna Camisa, John Rensenhouse as Airline Official as Rhoda Gemignani as Mrs. Rossini.
| 142 | 21 | "Couple Trouble" | Asaad Kelada | Daniel Palladino | February 27, 1990 | 0621 | 27.6 |
It's a Friday night and everyone is busy but Tony and Angela. They decide to go out and make some friends at the country club. They meet a couple who works together, has known each other for six years and can't keep their hands off of each other. The man ends up proposing to her with Tony and Angela at the table. Tony and Angela's new friends come over for a night out and when Tony goes into the kitchen to help Jane polish a frame, Brad grabs Angela and starts to kiss her. When they go out to dinner, Jane grabs Tony's butt while they are dancing. Tony and Angela decide that their new friends are crazy and to never see them again. But, after a stressful date, Angela shows Tony how Brad kissed her.
| 143 | 22 | "Operation Mona" | Asaad Kelada | Story by : Joe Fisch; Teleplay by : David Lesser | March 13, 1990 | 0622 | 27.4 |
Mona was careless in the apartment and it has extensive smoke damage, and while she is waiting for repairs to get done, she moves in with Angela. Angela brings up that maybe she would like to go and live in a semi-retirement community, but Mona will not have it and says that Angela is just trying to get a tax write-off, Angela calls her an ingrate. Mona has to have surgery on her gallbladder and Angela thinks that it is her fault. Mona tells Angela that she wants to stay at the house because then she can be near her little girl.
| 144 | 23 | "Road Scholar" | Asaad Kelada | Gene Braunstein | March 27, 1990 | 0623 | 24.8 |
Sam has her heart on attending Tate University, but Tony insists she keep an open mind, so the two take a road trip to visit some schools. Sam eventually gets a letter from Tate requesting an interview, but things don't go as she hopes. Guest Stars: Shana Lane-Block as Bonnie, Armin Shimerman as Mr. Warner, Carole Ita White as Receptionist, Marianne Hagan as Lynn and Paige Pengra as Student.
| 145 | 24 | "Beautician Heal Thyself" | Asaad Kelada | Linda Va Salle & Mike Teverbaugh | April 10, 1990 | 0625 | 24.4 |
Al has graduated beauty school, and Tony helps him set up a salon in Brooklyn. Al's behavior towards the customers upsets them, and when Tony explains that Al will never make it unless he changes his ways, Al decides to close the shop.
| 146 | 25 | "Sit Down and Be Counted" | Asaad Kelada | Ken Cinnamon & Danny Kallis & Joe Fisch & Karen Wengrod | May 1, 1990 | 0626 | 20.3 |
Mona fills out the census when she is bored and makes a few things up. A census worker comes to set the record straight. The episode is a series of clip-show, flashbacks, including Tony seeing Angela get out of the tub, Tony telling Angela he loves her before he goes in for surgery, and when Angela said that she loved Tony in her sleep.
| 147 | 26 | "The All-Nighter" | Asaad Kelada | Clay Graham | May 8, 1990 | 0624 | 20.1 |
Tony is studying for his final in Art History, so he and his study group rent a motel room to study all night. He ends up alone with one of his blonde and beautiful classmates in the motel room, and he ends up making out with her and maybe more. Angela finds out about their night and is hurt. She asks Tony if it is over, and he says that he does not know. They end up talking about their relationship and how they don't know exactly where it is leading but they should see other people while they figure things out. Guest Stars: Kate Vernon as Kathleen Sawyer, Stan Ivar as Peter Gerber, John Sanderford as Jon Petrie, Dick Miller as Motel Manager, Tara Karsian as Debbie, Dan Stockenberg as Kyle as Jordan Brady as Dave.

=== Season 7 (1990–91) ===
| No. overall | No. in season | Title | Directed by | Written by | Original release date | Prod. code | U.S. viewers (millions) |
|---|---|---|---|---|---|---|---|
| 148 | 1 | "Ridiculous Liaisons" | Tony Singletary | Daniel Palladino | September 18, 1990 | 0701 | 23.8 |
Angela is out on a date with Peter, who choked on a piece of pork. A man named Christopher was there and saved his life. Angela is smitten with Christopher and asks him to go to an awards dinner with her. Everyone in the family seems to love Christopher, but Tony cannot catch a glimpse of him. Christopher gets Jonathan a girlfriend and helps Sam to learn the flute. Christopher asks Angela to go to Athens with him. Tony ends up taking Kathleen to the place where Angela and Christopher are on a date to get a look at him.
| 149 | 2 | "Hey Dude!" | Tony Singletary | Richard Albrecht & Casey Keller | September 25, 1990 | 0702 | 21.9 |
Samantha is thinking about staying in New Mexico longer and putting off college for a little while. So Angela and Tony decide to fly out there to talk some sense into her, and the whole family comes along. Samantha wants to stay for more than the scenery, as there is a cowboy named Matt that is in the picture, who Sam considers marrying. Samantha decides to come home and go to college.
| 150 | 3 | "The Fabulous Robinson Sisters" | Tony Singletary | Michael Swerdlick | October 2, 1990 | 0703 | 22.7 |
Tony is going out with Kathleen and Angela is home alone buried in her work. He talks Mona into taking Angela with her to the Jazz Club. Mona and Angela have a bad time, and Mona tells Angela to get out and live her life. Angela starts to do all the things that she has wanted to do for a long time. Mona and Tony are starting to wonder what happened to Angela and want her to go back to her old ways, but Samantha reminds them that she has finally started to be happy again. Angela realizes that she needs to get back to her responsibilities.
| 151 | 4 | "Did You Ever Have to Make Up Your Mind?" | Tony Singletary | Clay Graham | October 9, 1990 | 0704 | 27.5 |
Angela tries to go bowling with her new boyfriend, but never gets farther than the parking lot. Tony is going on another date with Kathleen and is going to go and meet her father. Ms. Rossini brings over a little boy that she babysits named Billy, whom Angela ends up babysiting. Kathleen's father takes Tony hunting and invites him to marry his daughter. Tony tries to explain what happened with her father to Kathleen, but she just thinks that Tony wants to get married and have kids with her. Tony later has some flashforwards of what their life would look like and everything he imagines always has Angela in it somewhere. He tells Kathleen that he will always have Angela in his mind, and they break up.
| 152 | 5 | "One Flew Over the Empty Nest" | Tony Singletary | Mike Teverbaugh & Linda Va Salle | October 16, 1990 | 0705 | 24.5 |
Samantha moves out of the house and moves into her new dorm room. Her new roommate is disappointed that her friend, Jill, isn't her roommate and Sam is. However, Tony knows her roommate and Sam is accepted into her roommate's group of friends, along with Tony. Samantha, overwhelmed by her father's presence, tells him not to hang out with her friends anymore. Samantha soon learns that he was just feeling lonely around the house, so she gets everyone together to watch a fight on TV.
| 153 | 6 | "The Kid" | Tony Singletary | Bob Rosenfarb | October 23, 1990 | 0706 | 24.5 |
Billy comes to stay with Tony and Angela for the weekend while his grandma recovers from a fall. Angela is going out with Andy the doctor and Tony becomes jealous. Tony and Billy go to the hospital to visit his grandmother and she tell Tony that she wants him to have her grandson and Tony agrees. Angela and Tony decide to take Billy into their home.
| 154 | 7 | "Parental Guidance Suggested" | Tony Singletary | Gene Braunstein | October 30, 1990 | 0707 | 22.6 |
It is Billy's first day of school, and Angela and Tony are more nervous than he is. Billy comes home and wants to quit school because the other kids were saying mean things to him. When Tony takes him to school the next day he finds out that another boy did say that he did not like him, but it was because Billy hit him in the head, and he has been hitting all of the kids. Tony and Angela decide to take a parenting class. When they get home, Billy has been doing chores for Mona all day long and tells them that he wants to live with her. Angela's date Andy becomes upset about Billy ruining their dates. Mona brings Billy back over and tells Tony and Angela that it is their constant planning of Billy's day that is making him want to hit everyone.
| 155 | 8 | "Roomies" | Tony Singletary | David Lesser | November 6, 1990 | 0708 | 21.3 |
Dorm life is too much for Sam, so she moves into an off-campus house with an engaged couple. But when the couple breaks up, Sam is left living alone with the guy, who soon develops feelings for her. Matters are complicated further when Matt, Sam's boyfriend from New Mexico, pays a surprise visit and misconstrues the situation. He comes by later, and Sam decides to move out of the dorm, making everyone happy. Therefore, Sam and Matt get back together.
| 156 | 9 | "Four Alarm Tony" | Tony Singletary | Neil Lebowitz | November 13, 1990 | 0709 | 22.3 |
Tony becomes a volunteer fireman. His dedication is a little too extreme, so he gets the boot.
| 157 | 10 | "Starlight Memories" | Tony Singletary | Clay Graham | November 20, 1990 | 0711 | 22.8 |
Tony wants to ask Angela to the Starlight Ball, but one of her clients asks her just before he does. So Tony invites the lady that checks his groceries at the store. While at the dance, Tony and Angela meet a couple that has been married for 46 years, he was from Brooklyn and she was from Connecticut. The couple tells their story about how they meet in the ballroom and got married 6 hours later.
| 158 | 11 | "Inherit the Wine" | Tony Singletary | Daniel Palladino | November 27, 1990 | 0710 | 22.4 |
When Tony gets a call in the middle of the night and only hears three words "Wine, execution, and death," he, of course, thinks the worst. It turns out to be for the reading of his late Uncle Aldo's will at his vineyard. Tony, Angela, Sam, and Billy fly to Italy to accept to what he received in the will. He ends up inheriting his uncle's vineyard. The townspeople turn on Tony because they think that he will treat them the same as his uncle, who paid them basically nothing, and never gave them time off. Tony gives the townspeople the vineyard.
| 159 | 12 | "Who's Minding the Kid?" | Tony Singletary | Barry Vigon & Deborah Leschin | December 4, 1990 | 0712 | 22.2 |
A social worker pays a surprise visit to Tony and Angela to check up on Billy. Unfortunately, everyone in the family has had a turn minding Billy that day, and no one seems to know where he is.
| 160 | 13 | "Broadcast Blues" | Tony Singletary | Linda Va Salle & Mike Teverbaugh | December 18, 1990 | 0714 | 20.7 |
Tony and Sam compete for a college job as a sportscaster. Sam expects Tony to give it his best shot, but she is afraid that, since she is running against him, he will let her win. Tony's audition tape, however, misleads Sam about his intentions.
| 161 | 14 | "Days of Blunder" | Tony Singletary | Deborah Leschin & Barry Vigon | January 8, 1991 | 0713 | 24.1 |
Tony and Angela head to a funeral for a man from the old neighborhood. Billy, Samantha, and Jonathan cannot stop fighting. Jonathan has a crush on a girl older than he is and Tony tells him to do whatever it takes to make sure she knows how he feels. When she wants to go downtown, he offers to drive her (despite not having a license) in Tony's car. While out on his adventure, he jumps a curb and runs through a rose bush. Jonathan asks Sam for help and she says no. Mona tells Sam that Jonathan idolizes her and carries a picture in his wallet and tells everyone how great his big sister is, so she decides to help. Tony finds out and Samantha, Mona, and Billy try to take the blame, Jonathan comes clean and tells the truth. Jonathan got punished for it. Tony is just happy that they are sticking together and are helping each other out.
| 162 | 15 | "You Can Go Home Again" | Tony Singletary | Carol Starr Schneider | January 22, 1991 | 0715 | 22.7 |
Tony and Angela invite Sam to temporarily move back into the house while she is sick. She is skeptical at first, but soon is taking full advantage of their hospitality. Only Jonathan sees that she is milking Tony and Angela for their attention.
| 163 | 16 | "Ms. Mom" | Tony Singletary | Richard Albrecht & Casey Keller | January 29, 1991 | 0716 | 22.3 |
Tony is starting his student teaching and is trying to find a housekeeper for two weeks. Angela has taken the next two weeks off and has volunteered for the job. The first day it is pointed out to her that she does nothing the way that Tony does it, she decides to let it be known that things will be done her way. Angela snaps and lets the whole house become a shamble and snaps at anyone that gets in her way. Then she finally quits thinking that she didn't do anything right, but realizes she taught Billy how to ride his bike.
| 164 | 17 | "The Unsinkable Tony Micelli" | Tony Singletary | Gene Braunstein | February 5, 1991 | 0717 | 21.3 |
Billy is excited about taking swimming lessons with Tony at the YMCA. Tony confesses to Angela his lifelong fear of the water, and cops out of swimming by claiming a back injury. When Billy believes Tony's refusal to swim with him is due to a lack of faith in him, Tony tells Billy the truth. Note: Both CTV and Hulu versions of this episode are the edited, Syndicated cut.
| 165 | 18 | "Tony and Angela Get Divorced" | Tony Singletary | Michele J. Wolff | February 12, 1991 | 0718 | 23.5 |
Tony and Angela are audited by an IRS agent after Angela's accountant is arrested. The auditor suspects that Tony and Angela are more than employer and employee, and alleges that they may be inadvertently be married already. After their marriage is annulled, they make out in the judge's court room.
| 166 | 19 | "Let Me Tell You 'Bout the Birds and the Bees" | Tony Singletary | Linda Va Salle & Mike Teverbaugh | February 19, 1991 | 0719 | 22.6 |
A plumbing crisis at home calls Tony away from teaching his class, so Mona sits in, and ends up speaking to the students about sex. When Tony learns about this, particularly when the school principal calls him to his office, he furiously scolds Mona for being irresponsible. Special Guest Star: Franklin Cover as Mr.Campbell
| 167 | 20 | "Party Politics" | Tony Singletary | Phil Doran & Bob Rosenfarb & Gene Braunstein | February 26, 1991 | 0720 | 20.9 |
It is Billy's 6th birthday and the neighbors down the street are throwing a birthday party the same day as Billy's. Mr. Harper depresses the clown that Tony hires and he quits Billy's party. Tony and Angela compete against the Harpers to get all of the neighborhood kids to their party, and Tony and Angela end up winning when Mr. Harper ruins his son's cake. However, Tony and Angela realize that they turned into their worst nightmare, the Harpers.
| 168 | 21 | "Choose Me" | Tony Singletary | Dawn Aldredge & Mona Marshall | March 12, 1991 | 0721 | 22.9 |
Mrs. Rossini is bunking at the house because a woman in her building was murdered. Mona and her new boyfriend, Clifford (Charles Frank), were forced to stay at the house for dinner, and when Clifford went into the kitchen to answer his pager he ended up making out with Mrs. Rossini. Mona finds out and Tony kicks him out of the house, but he comes back and says that he hopes that both Mona and Mrs. Rossini stick by him until he can sort out his feelings. Mona and Mrs. Rossini agree, and he leaves, then Mona and Mrs. Rossini almost get into a fist fight. They both end up going on a date with Clifford, and Angela is helping Mona get him, and Tony is helping Ms. Rossini. Both women decide that they don't want someone that is a wimp and can't decide between them.
| 169 | 22 | "Tony and the Princess" | Tony Singletary | Danny Kallis & Clay Graham & Daniel Palladino | March 26, 1991 | 0722 | 20.1 |
A demanding and feared figure from Tony's old neighborhood (Raymond Serra) asks Tony to provide guidance for his wayward daughter (Shareen Mitchell). She soon becomes more than Tony can handle, and he tells her off. Her threat to tell her father of Tony's mistreatment has Tony panicked.
| 170 | 23 | "Between a Rock and a Hard Place" | Tony Singletary | Linda Va Salle & Mike Teverbaugh and Michele J. Wolff | April 16, 1991 | 0723 | 17.3 |
Sam is looking to book a band for a college event. A friend of Tony's tells her he can get the band Wilson Phillips to perform. Sam promises the school a Wilson Phillips concert, but disappointment abounds when the agent confesses that he lied about his musical connections.
| 171 | 24 | "The Road to Washington: Part 1" | Tony Singletary | Daniel Palladino | April 30, 1991 | 0724 | 16.0 |
Tony is chosen by some local elders to go to Washington, D.C., to speak on their behalf about much needed health care revisions and lobby to the us senators on their behalf. Tony's inability to sleep on the train ride leads to catastrophic results as he presents his case to a Senate subcommittee leading to be patriotic, but also pass out, leaving Angela to do CPR.
| 172 | 25 | "The Road to Washington: Part 2" | Tony Singletary | Gene Braunstein | May 7, 1991 | 0725 | 15.8 |
An attractive young government representative becomes Tony's guide to major events and public appearances around America's capital. Angela begins to suspect that the woman's intentions toward Tony are less than pure. Angela tells Tony that she 'likes' him. After Angela tells Tony how she feels about him, she kisses him.

=== Season 8 (1991–92) ===
| No. overall | No. in season | Title | Directed by | Written by | Original release date | Prod. code | U.S viewers (millions) |
|---|---|---|---|---|---|---|---|
| 173 | 1 | "Seer of Love" | Tony Singletary | Michele J. Wolff | September 28, 1991 | 0801 | 15.4 |
It is Tony and Angela's 7th anniversary. Billy says that his grandmother is feeling better and he moves back home with her. Angela gets Tony a watch that is inscribed with "it is time that I say I love you" and Tony gets her a car seat cover. Tony takes Angela to a carnival as their anniversary dinner. While at the carnival, they go and see a psychic who tells Tony that if he does not kiss his true love by midnight, then he will lose her forever. She also tells him that she sees love written across time. Afterwards, Tony is making fun of the psychic and Angela gives him the watch. Angela and Tony end up in the tunnel of love and Tony tells Angela that he loves her. They end up stuck in the tunnel of love making out.
| 174 | 2 | "An Affair to Forget" | Tony Singletary | Gene Braunstein | October 5, 1991 | 0802 | 14.7 |
Tony is afraid to let anyone know what was said to Angela and he does not want anyone to see them kissing. Angela and Tony decide to keep their relationship a secret. They get everyone out of the house for the night and try to have a romantic evening, but everyone is sneaking people into the house, thinking that no one would be home. Tony and Angela have to leave the house and end up at a hotel but things don't go right there either, then they end up next to a lake in the car. While at the lake they are kissing, and the parking brake comes undone and they drive into the lake. The police call the family and they rush up to make sure that they are okay and find out everything.
| 175 | 3 | "Misery" | Tony Singletary | Clay Graham | October 12, 1991 | 0804 | 11.8 |
Tony's love for Angela becomes obsessive infatuation, and it begins to drive Angela crazy.
| 176 | 4 | "Selling Sam Short" | Tony Singletary | Linda Va Salle & Mike Teverbaugh | October 19, 1991 | 0803 | 12.5 |
Sam dates Pierce, a stockbroker (Dan Gauthier), who acquires Tony as a client. Tony becomes infatuated with his own financial fate and demands much of Pierce's time, which takes away from Pierce's time with Sam.
| 177 | 5 | "Tony Bags a Big One" | Tony Singletary | Michele J. Wolff | October 26, 1991 | 0805 | 11.4 |
While Angela is away on business, Mona begins dating one of her biggest clients. She finds him thoroughly uninteresting and promptly dumps him. In an attempt to prevent him from withdrawing his account from the agency, Tony accompanies him on a duck hunt. An accidental gunshot only makes things worse.
| 178 | 6 | "A Well-Kept Housekeeper" | Tony Singletary | Danny Kallis & Phil Doran & Bob Rosenfarb | November 2, 1991 | 0806 | 11.4 |
Tony feels inferior to Angela's success. A letter that addresses him as "Mr. Angela Bower" doesn't help his self-esteem. So he tries to show he can keep up with the other men at a party Angela takes him to by buying her an expensive painting (that he cannot afford). He takes a second job at a bar, but that proves to be a mistake. Special appearance by Ed McMahon.
| 179 | 7 | "Death and Love: Part 1" | Tony Singletary | Danny Kallis & Phil Doran & Bob Rosenfarb | November 9, 1991 | 0807 | 13.7 |
Tony almost kills Angela while trying to propose to her on a Vermont ski trip.
| 180 | 8 | "Death and Love: Part 2" | Tony Singletary | Bob Rosenfarb & Danny Kallis & Phil Doran | November 16, 1991 | 0808 | 14.5 |
Tony proposes to Angela at a New York Giants game on the blimp, but she says no. Tony is heartbroken and is walking around in his bathrobe. It turns out that Angela said no because she is scared that she will fail at another marriage. So Angela proposes to Tony.
| 181 | 9 | "Grandmommie Dearest" | Tony Singletary | Gene Braunstein | November 23, 1991 | 0810 | 14.4 |
Mona's mother arrives to sabotage Angela and Tony's wedding by suggesting that they sign a prenuptial agreement.
| 182 | 10 | "Field of Screams" | Tony Singletary | Story by : Linda Va Salle & Mike Teverbaugh; Teleplay by : Clay Graham & Michele J. Wolff | November 30, 1991 | 0809 | 11.6 |
When Samantha decides to pursue a job at the campus travel agency, she asks for Tony's help, which brings back memories of when Tony helped Jonathan get a job.
| 183 | 11 | "This Sold House" | Tony Singletary | Story by : Clay Graham & Michele J. Wolff; Teleplay by : Linda Va Salle & Mike Teverbaugh | December 7, 1991 | 0811 | 12.3 |
Tony persuades Angela to accept a huge offer for the Bower house so they can buy a dream house of their own, but when they find out what the buyer is planning on doing with the house, they decide not to sell.
| 184 | 12 | "Tony, Can You Spare a Dime?" | Tony Singletary | Gene Braunstein & Michele J. Wolff | January 4, 1992 | 0813 | 11.5 |
Tony takes away Angela's credit cards and imposes tough restrictions on the family budget, when Angela's business falls into a slump.
| 185 | 13 | "Mrs. Al" | Tony Singletary | Linda Va Salle & Mike Teverbaugh | January 11, 1992 | 0814 | 13.2 |
Sam gets in trouble with Tony when she poses as Al's wife to help him get an apartment.
| 186 | 14 | "Who's the Boss?" | Tony Singletary | Linda Va Salle & Mike Teverbaugh | January 25, 1992 | 0815 | 11.9 |
A discussion about who is head of the household escalates into a war when Angela throws Tony out after he pretends to be injured so he wouldn't have to go to the ballet with Angela.
| 187 | 15 | "Tony Micelli, This is Your Other Life" | Tony Singletary | Michele J. Wolff | February 1, 1992 | 0816 | 13.7 |
Tony accidentally mixes chemicals and passes out. He wakes up in a dream world where he never hurt his shoulder playing baseball and is a world famous ball player. His old coach gives him his other life, and he will get to choose which one he wants. In the alternate life, Samantha never sees Tony and has written a book called "Most Valuable Player, Least Valuable Father." Angela hates Tony and they have to work together on an advertising strategy for him and she never opened her own agency. Jonathan goes to boarding school 300 miles away, and Mona lives in London.
| 188 | 16 | "Allergic to Love" | Tony Singletary | Adam I. Lapidus | February 8, 1992 | 0812 | 12.9 |
Tony is allergic to something that is making his lips swell. Every time he kisses Angela is when they start to plump up, so everyone assumes that he is either allergic to Angela or he is scared to get married. Tony tries to figure out what is causing the allergic reaction, and it turns out it was the envelopes he was licking to send out the wedding invitations.
| 189 | 17 | "Better Off Wed: Part 1" | Tony Singletary | Danny Kallis & Phil Doran & Bob Rosenfarb & Clay Graham | February 15, 1992 | 0817 | 13.7 |
Samantha brings home Hank, her fiance. She is trying to break it to the family but they blow up, so she and Hank sneak off to elope.
| 190 | 18 | "Better Off Wed: Part 2" | Tony Singletary | Danny Kallis & Phil Doran & Bob Rosenfarb & Clay Graham | February 22, 1992 | 0818 | 14.3 |
Sam and Hank are about to get married when Sam objects to the wedding; she does not feel right getting married without her father being there. Angela, Tony, Mona, Jonathan, Mrs. Rossini, and Hank's parents arrive before the marriage and Samantha tells Tony that she knows what she is doing and she loves Hank. Samantha and Hank are married.
| 191 | 19 | "Tony and the Honeymooners" | Tony Singletary | Gene Braunstein | February 29, 1992 | 0819 | 11.0 |
Samantha is home from her honeymoon and is staying the night at the house in her old room. Tony can hear every giggle and it is driving him nuts, so he takes the door off of the room so he can get some sleep. The next day, the school calls and says that they do not have any married student housing available, so they are still at the house. Tony starts to bond with Hank, but Angela becomes frustrated because she can't get any time alone with Tony.
| 192 | 20 | "Split Decision" | Tony Singletary | Linda Va Salle & Mike Teverbaugh | March 21, 1992 | 0820 | 12.6 |
As their wedding approaches, Tony Micelli and Angela Bower experience a rough patch, bickering constantly over everything from doubles tennis to restaurant choices. Meanwhile, Samantha's presence keeps her husband, Hank, from focusing on his urgent college studies. To give the engaged couple some breathing room and help Hank study, Mona Robinson takes Angela and Samantha away for a luxury weekend getaway at a posh spa resort. While at the resort, Angela, Mona, and Samantha are shocked to encounter Tom Saratelli (played by Tony Danza in a dual role), a wealthy gentleman guest who looks exactly like Tony, distinguished only by a mustache, Despite sharing Tony’s face and charm, Tom possesses an entirely opposite, passive, and highly refined personality. Initially, Angela is deeply attracted to Tom's smooth, high-society demeanour and the effortless way he handles conflicts, viewing him as a version of Tony without any of his frustrating faults. Back at home, a paranoid Tony remains behind with Jonathan Bower. Convinced that Angela is out meeting other men, Tony drives himself crazy with jealousy. Jonathan acts as the voice of reason, reassuring Tony that he knows Angela better than anyone and that her loyalty is unshakeable. As the weekend progresses, Angela spends more time with Tom at the country club and on the tennis courts. However, she soon realizes that his passive nature and lack of emotional fire leave her completely cold. She recognizes that she misses Tony's energetic, fiery temper and realizes she loves him exactly as he is, flaws included. Angela rejects the polished doppelgänger, eager to return home to the real Tony.
| 193 | 21 | "Mr. Micelli Builds His Dream House" | Tony Singletary | Bob Rosenfarb & Clay Graham & Danny Kallis & Phil Doran | March 28, 1992 | 0821 | 11.3 |
There is a leak in the house so Tony needs to replace the window in order to get it to stop. He decides to put in a bigger window and then that leads to a whole avalanche of ideas. Sam's father-in-law does the job, but Tony's enthusiasm is driving him insane.
| 194 | 22 | "Savor the Veal: Part 1" | Tony Singletary | Phil Doran & Bob Rosenfarb & Danny Kallis & Phil Doran | April 18, 1992 | 0822 | 9.6 |
Tony graduates from college, but finds it hard to land a job. He finally gets one, but now has to choose between Angela and a great job in Iowa. He doesn't want to leave his family behind, but Jonathan is scheduled to go away to college next year. Additionally, Sam is now married and busy with college. He decides, with Angela's blessing, that he will take the job and they will both commute back and forth.
| 195 | 23 | "Savor the Veal: Parts 2 & 3" | Tony Singletary | Bob Rosenfarb & Bart Fink & Danny Kallis & Phil Doran | April 25, 1992 | 0823 | 20.5 |
| 196 | 24 | "Savor the Veal: Parts 2 & 3" | Tony Singletary | Bob Rosenfarb & Bart Fink & Danny Kallis & Phil Doran | April 25, 1992 | 0824 | 20.5 |
Tony and Angela hardly ever get to see each other and cannot coordinate their schedules so they hardly get to spend any time together. Tony throws a surprise party to welcome Angela to Iowa, and she gets there totally hammered from drinking on the flight. She is living there to be closer to Tony, she left her business with one of her partners. After one month she is adapting to Iowa lifestyle and has joined a bowling team and knitting blankets but still misses her old life. The family comes for a visit and Tony's team wins the championships. Mona tells Angela that she is losing a big client in Connecticut and Angela comes up with a plan to win him back, but Mona made it all up to see if Angela really wanted to live in Iowa. Angela tells Tony that she has to live her life and she does not want to stop him and moves back to Connecticut. As with the first episode Tony comes back and knocks on the door and Angela answers in her bathrobe, they get back together and he moves back.
