= List of The Upper Hand episodes =

The Upper Hand is a British television sitcom which broadcast on ITV. It was adapted from the American series, Who's the Boss?, created by Martin Cohan and Blake Hunter, who went on to serve as creative consultants for the British version. The series was produced by Central, in association with Columbia Pictures Television, and later Columbia TriStar Central and Carlton Productions. It stars Joe McGann, Diana Weston, Honor Blackman, Kellie Bright and William Puttock.

During the course of the programme, 94 episodes of The Upper Hand aired over seven series, between 1 May 1990 and 14 October 1996.

== Series overview ==
Series	Episodes	Originally released	
Series	Episodes	First released	Last released
1	13	1 May 1990	27 December 1990
2	12	18 February 1991	20 May 1991
3	13	5 November 1991	11 February 1992
4	19	20 October 1992	22 February 1993
5	16	9 September 1993	23 December 1993
6	14	6 January 1995	8 April 1995
7	7	2 September 1996	14 October 1996

== Episodes ==
=== Series 1 (1990) ===
No. overall	No. in series	Title	Directed by	Written by	Original release date
1	1	"Just the Job"	Martin Dennis	Martin Cohan and Blake Hunter	1 May 1990
Charlie Burrows and his daughter Joanna leave London. On arriving at his new job, Charlie meets his new boss Caroline for the first time.
2	2	"Briefless Encounter"	Martin Dennis	Martin Cohan and Blake Hunter	8 May 1990
Charlie decides to take a bath in Caroline's bathroom but he gets more than he bargains for when he goes in there.
3	3	"Dinner for Two"	Martin Dennis	Bud Wiser	15 May 1990
Caroline orders in a dinner for two for her date but her date gets stuck in Brussels. Charlie forfeits his date to stay with Caroline.
4	4	"The Old Girl Network"	Martin Dennis	Dawn Aldredge and Judith Bustany	22 May 1990
Trish (Susan Kyd), an old friend of Caroline's, comes to stay and makes a play for Charlie.
5	5	"Caroline's First Fight"	Martin Dennis	Robert Sternin and Prudence Fraser, A: Nicholas Hyde	29 May 1990
Joanna and Tom get into trouble for fighting and they run away to Joanna's old neighbourhood. Charlie and Caroline go after them but soon Caroline finds herself in trouble.
6	6	"Who's Who?"	Mike Holgate	S: Monica Parker, T: Bud Wiser	5 June 1990
Both Caroline and Charlie are mistaken for other people, but they do not admit to their mistaken identities, which makes things difficult with their respective dates.
7	7	"Growing Pains"	Martin Dennis	Paul Robinson Hunter	10 July 1990
Charlie needs to accept that Joanna is growing up. Laura and Caroline are on hand to help.
8	8	"Paint Your Wagon"	Martin Dennis	Lissa Levin	17 July 1990
Employer and employee lines are crossed when Charlie makes a decision about Caroline's car.
9	9	"Welcome Home (Part 1)"	Mike Holgate	Robert Sternin and Prudence Fraser	24 July 1990
Charlie finds himself in the way when Caroline's adventurer husband Michael (Nicky Henson) returns from the jungle.
10	10	"Welcome Home (Part 2)"	Mike Holgate	Robert Sternin and Prudence Fraser	31 July 1990
Whilst the relationship between Caroline and her husband becomes strained, Charlie find himself a perfect new job, but something is missing.
11	11	"Just Like Charlie"	Martin Dennis	Ken Cinnamon and Karen Wengrod	6 August 1990
Tom steals a car hub cap as a prank, in order to emulate Charlie in his younger days.
12	12	"First Kiss"	Martin Dennis	S: Bud Wiser, T: Robert Sternin, Prudence Fraser and Ellen Guylas	14 August 1990
It is Caroline's birthday, but everyone seems to have forgotten, even Charlie. She goes out for a meal with friends, and returns home drunk, as does Charlie. Charlie feels bad for forgetting her birthday, so they head into the kitchen to bake a cake.
13	13	"Requiem"	Martin Dennis	T: Paul Robinson Hunter, Robert Sternin and Prudence Fraser; S: Blake Hunter and Martin Cohan	27 December 1990
Christmas special. Christmas is coming and Charlie is short of money. Laura trails him and suspects a woman. But the truth is that Charlie cannot say goodbye. Caroline helps him move on.

=== Series 2 (1991) ===
No. overall	No. in series	Title	Directed by	Written by	Original release date
14	1	"Common Entrance"	Martin Dennis	Norm Gunzenhauser and Tom Seeley	18 February 1991
Joanna's friend Camilla is transferring to St Hilda's School for Girls; the same school that Caroline attended.
15	2	"When Worlds Collide"	Martin Dennis	Karen Wengrod and Ken Cinnamon	25 February 1991
Caroline invites Charlie's poker playing cronies to play in Henley on Saturday night; unfortunately, she has forgotten she has an old friend coming for dinner on the same night.
16	3	"Wedding Bells (Part 1)"	Martin Dennis	Robert Sternin and Prudence Fraser	4 March 1991
Caroline's former husband, Michael, plans to remarry in the south of France and makes an unexpected announcement to Caroline.
17	4	"Wedding Bells (Part 2)"	Martin Dennis	Robert Sternin and Prudence Fraser	11 March 1991
The whole family is still in the South of France and Caroline is still coming to terms with Michael's request for joint custody of Tom.
18	5	"Cupid's Arrows"	Mike Holgate	Paul Robinson Hunter	18 March 1991
Tom sets up a romantic blind date for his mother and Charlie.
19	6	"The Babysitter"	Martin Dennis	Bud Wiser	8 April 1991
When their regular babysitter lets them down, Caroline and Charlie agree that Joanna can babysit for Tom.
20	7	"Playing to Win"	Mike Holgate	T: Steve Curwick; S: Carrie Honigblum, Michele Buehler Glazer and Renee Phillips	15 April 1991
Tom is encouraged by his school to take a more active role so he chooses gymnastics. When he breaks his shoulder, Caroline blames Charlie for the accident.
21	8	"The Heiress"	Mike Holgate	Alan L. Gansberg	22 April 1991
When Laura inherits some money from a mystery man Caroline does a bit of innocent investigating to find out who he was, and comes across a secret that was meant to stay hidden.
22	9	"A Friend in Need"	Mike Holgate	T: Carrie Honigblum, Michele Buehler Glazer and Renee Phillips; S: Cheri and Bill Steinkellner	29 April 1991
Caroline foolishly lets her neighbour, Diana Wilkinson (Linda Hayden), stay on the sofa for a few nights after she catches her husband cheating.
23	10	"And the Winner Is..."	Martin Dennis	Seth Weisbord	6 May 1991
Caroline loses out on an advertising award but she feels even more aggravated that the winner is a young prodigy whom she trained. When Charlie wins a darts competition, she believes she is even more of a failure. After receiving an invitation to the advertising awards ceremony, it takes a great deal of strength and decorum on Caroline's part to act benevolently when Charlie persuades her to attend.
24	11	"She's My Girl"	Martin Dennis	T: Renee Phillips and Michele Buehler Glazer; S: Carrie Honigblum	13 May 1991
Tom gets upset when a girl he likes gets a crush on Charlie.
25	12	"The Anniversary"	Martin Dennis	Robert Sternin, Prudence Fraser and Ellen Guylas	20 May 1991
Charlie and Caroline celebrate his first anniversary as her housekeeper.

=== Series 3 (1991–92) ===
No. overall	No. in series	Title	Directed by	Written by	Original release date
26	1	"Bedtime Story"	Martin Dennis	Ellen Guylas	5 November 1991
Caroline is interviewed at home by the famous local reporter, Becky Barnes.
27	2	"First Date"	Martin Dennis	Daniel Palladino	12 November 1991
After Caroline takes an escort to the advertising awards, Charlie decides it is time that he took her out for a date. He decides that a Comedy Club is the ideal place for a first date however, Caroline is not impressed.
28	3	"Once Bitten, Twice Shy"	Martin Dennis	Jan Worthington	19 November 1991
Joanna unsuccessfully tries to hide from Charlie the love bite the coolest guy in the school, gave her. He tries to warn her about how teenage boys can be manipulative with girls.
29	4	"Older Than Springtime"	Martin Dennis	Alan Mandel	26 November 1991
Caroline pursues an advertising account with a trendy, young fashion design agency.
30	5	"Neighbours"	Martin Dennis	Don Segall and Phil Margo	3 December 1991
Problems ensure when new neighbours decide to re-establish their garden boundaries. More problems occur when Charlie and Caroline catch the neighbours' daughter kissing Tom.
31	6	"Old Flames"	Martin Dennis	Daniel Palladino	10 December 1991
An old friend of Caroline's, Brian Thomas, appears at the door and declares that he is Caroline's husband. Note: William Puttock (Tom) is credited for, but does not appear in, this episode. Guest starring Rolf Saxon.
32	7	"Wheels"	Martin Dennis	Alan Mandel	17 December 1991
Charlie is torn about replacing the van. This episode features the 1976 hit "You to Me Are Everything" by The Real Thing during the episode and in the credits, replacing the theme tune.
33	8	"The Honeymooners"	Martin Dennis	Gene Braunstein and Bob Perlow	7 January 1992
Charlie takes Caroline to a footballers' reunion with Kevin Keegan. Charlie bumps into an old flame and pretends he and Caroline are married.
34	9	"The Whiz Kid"	Martin Dennis	Joe Fisch	14 January 1992
Charlie starts to get jealous when Caroline is spending all her time with the new guy at work. Guest starring Martin Clunes.
35	10	"Family Ties"	Martin Dennis	Ellen Guylas	21 January 1992
Charlie's father-in-law Nick turns up, but their relationship is not the best. However, things change when Nick claims he is dying - but things may not be what they seem. Guest starring Anthony Newley.
36	11	"The Proposal"	Martin Dennis	Ellen Guylas	28 January 1992
Geoffrey creates a special evening for Caroline and confides in Laura that he is going to offer her a share in his timeshare, but Caroline is expecting an entirely different proposal. Guest starring Simon Williams.
37	12	"Business and Pleasure"	Martin Dennis	Bob Perlow and Gene Braunstein	4 February 1992
Caroline gifts Charlie with a high-class golf membership, but Laura wants him to use his charm to get her a rich business client in return.
38	13	"Pillow Talk"	Martin Dennis	Ken Cinnamon and Karen Wengrod	11 February 1992
Caroline is distraught when she realises she has been talking loudly in her sleep.

=== Series 4 (1992–93) ===
No. overall	No. in series	Title	Directed by	Written by	Original release date
39	1	"Come Dancing"	Martin Shardlow	Daniel Palladino	20 October 1992
Caroline and Charlie go dancing and make some new friends who are about to make a big commitment.
40	2	"Blind Date"	Martin Shardlow	Paul Robinson Hunter	27 October 1992
Charlie convinces Caroline to go on a pity date with his recently divorced friend Trevor (Tim Brooke-Taylor).
41	3	"Sex, Lies and Exercise Tape"	Martin Shardlow	Seth Weisbord	3 November 1992
Caroline joins a health club and feels insecure about fitting in with the "in-crowd".
42	4	"Summoned to the Head"	Martin Shardlow	John Donley and Clay Graham	10 November 1992
Tom's school wants him to move a year ahead and Caroline is thrilled, but has to decide whether to cope with the influence of the older children.
43	5	"The Girl Next Door"	Martin Shardlow	Karen Wengrod and Ken Cinnamon	17 November 1992
Charlie takes the family to help Auntie Pat at the summer fayre and meets up with some people he used to know, including the only girl from his neighborhood who refused to date him.
44	6	"Charlie's Auntie's Uncle"	Martin Shardlow	Lee Aronsohn	24 November 1992
Auntie Pat's uncle Al needs someone to help him mend his criminal ways and Charlie volunteers.
45	7	"Match of the Day"	Martin Shardlow	Adam I. Lapidus	1 December 1992
When Charlie agrees to coach Caroline's volleyball team, she is the one that gets left out.
46	8	"Surprise, Surprise"	Martin Shardlow	Gene Braunstein	8 December 1992
Laura's innocent dinner party throws up some surprises.
47	9	"The Fugitive"	Martin Shardlow	Cheri Eichen and Bill Steinkellner	15 December 1992
Joanna is devastated to discover that, according to Charlie, her grandfather is not in Spain, but in prison.
48	10	"You Shall Go to the Ball"	Martin Shardlow	Karen Wengrod, Ken Cinnamon, Danny Kallis and Joe Fisch	22 December 1992
Laura takes on Caroline's identity so that she can gatecrash a society ball, but bites off more than she can chew.
49	11	"To Let or Not to Let"	Martin Shardlow	Daniel Palladino	28 December 1992
Charlie and Caroline cannot agree over Charlie's choice of tenant for Caroline's cottage.
50	12	"Big Bad Burrows"	Martin Shardlow	Dawn Aldredge and Judith Bustani	4 January 1993
A boxing match is used as a school fundraiser.
51	13	"Working Girls"	Martin Shardlow	Jake Weinberger and Mike Weinberger	11 January 1993
Charlie agrees to let Joanna spend a week with him on work experience. However, she soon wishes she was back at school.
52	14	"A Model Grandmother"	Martin Shardlow	Bud Wiser	18 January 1993
When Laura strikes a sexy pose for a magazine, it hampers Tom's chances of becoming form rep.
53	15	"The Manageress"	Martin Shardlow	Daniel Palladino	25 January 1993
Charlie tries to stop Joanna from managing Al's band, but when he changes his mind and tries to help her it causes a bigger row.
54	16	"Wish You Were Here"	Martin Shardlow	Gene Braunstein and Bob Perlow	1 February 1993
On a family trip to the Caribbean, Charlie feels left out, but a walk with Caroline in the moonlight soon turns out to be very revealing.
55	17	"A Walk on the Mild Side"	Martin Shardlow	John Donley and Clay Graham	8 February 1993
Charlie fears Caroline is asking for trouble when she asks out the youth club's wildest member.
56	18	"Take Your Pick"	Martin Shardlow	Dawn Aldredge and Mona Marshall	15 February 1993
Auntie Pat and Laura find their passions aroused by the same man, forcing Charlie and Caroline to take sides.
57	19	"Tunnel of Love"	Martin Shardlow	Michele J. Wolff	22 February 1993
It is time for declarations of love. Katherine Helmond (the only person to appear on Who's The Boss? and the British version) appears as Madame Alexandra, who predicts Charlie will marry the last woman he kisses before midnight.

=== Series 5 (1993) ===
No. overall	No. in series	Title	Directed by	Written by	Original release date
58	1	"Not in Front of the Children"	Martin Shardlow	Gene Braunstein	9 September 1993
Charlie and Caroline at last admit that they are in love. Charlie, however, wants to keep it secret.
59	2	"Misery"	Martin Shardlow	Clay Graham	16 September 1993
Caroline has sprained her ankle and is laid-up in bed. She becomes alarmed by Charlie's possessive behaviour. Charlie sings a few lines of the song "Puppy Love".
60	3	"Cheers"	Martin Shardlow	Claylene Jones	23 September 1993
Joanna is allowed to go to a party, but she gets drunk and becomes very ill as a consequence.
61	4	"Duck Soup"	Martin Shardlow	Michele J. Wolff	30 September 1993
Someone shot Caroline's biggest client. Charlie and Laura have some explaining to do.
62	5	"Minder"	Martin Shardlow	Danny Kallis, Clay Graham and Daniel Palladino	7 October 1993
Charlie repays a favour owed to an old friend by taking their unruly daughter on to help with the housekeeping.
63	6	"Wheel of Fortune"	Martin Shardlow	David Nathaniel Titcher	14 October 1993
When Laura is stood up, Charlie takes her and Caroline to the Casino as planned.
64	7	"The Price is Right"	Martin Shardlow	Sheldon Krasner and David Saling	21 October 1993
Charlie, disillusioned by the materialistic motives of a footballer, falls out with the rest of the family.
65	8	"Housewife's Choice"	Martin Shardlow	Richard Albrecht and Casey Keller	28 October 1993
When Charlie and Caroline swap roles, Caroline comes off worse.
66	9	"Who's the Boss?"	Martin Shardlow	Linda Va Salle and Mike Teverbaugh	4 November 1993
When Charlie feels nagged, he tries to let Caroline know who the real boss is with disastrous results.
67	10	"The Far Pavilion"	Martin Shardlow	S: Linda Va Salle and Mike Teverbaugh; T: Clay Graham and Michele J. Wolff	11 November 1993
Joanna asks Charlie to help her get a job, but he is reluctant, remembering the disaster he had on his hands after he helped Tom.
68	11	"The Porridge Diet"	Martin Shardlow	Howard Meyers	18 November 1993
Nick is released from prison and Caroline invites him to stay as he has nowhere else to go.
69	12	"Mixed Doubles"	Martin Shardlow	Linda Va Salle and Mike Teverbaugh	25 November 1993
Charlie becomes jealous of a long legged friend of Caroline's, while Caroline is spending time with someone very familiar.
70	13	"Full House"	Martin Shardlow	Linda Va Salle and Mike Teverbaugh	2 December 1993
Al is flat hunting but Charlie messes things up. Caroline has to market a new soft drink which tastes disgusting.
71	14	"Keep It in the Family"	Martin Shardlow	Clay Graham and John Donley	9 December 1993
Caroline is tempted by an offer to merge her company with another advertising agency, but Laura is not part of the package.
72	15	"Happy Ever After? (Part 1)"	Martin Shardlow	Phil Doran, Bob Rosenfarb and Danny Kallis	16 December 1993
Charlie promises not to put pressure on Caroline to marry him. They take an adventure holiday in which they go hiking and cycling.
73	16	"Happy Ever After? (Part 2)"	Martin Shardlow	Phil Doran, Bob Rosenfarb and Danny Kallis	23 December 1993
Caroline does not want to forgive Charlie for the way in which he proposed.

=== Series 6 (1995) ===
No. overall	No. in series	Title	Directed by	Written by	Original release date
74	1	"Moonlighting"	Martin Shardlow	Danny Kallis, Phil Doran and Bob Rosenfarb	6 January 1995
Now that Charlie is engaged to his boss, he is anxious to show he is not a kept man. He buys Caroline a painting he cannot afford and is forced to do a little moonlighting.
75	2	"Fatal Attraction"	Martin Shardlow	Clay Graham	13 January 1995
Charlie is left feeling guilty when his tennis opponent, Fred, drops dead on the court. The arrival of Fred's twin, Ted gives him an opportunity to make amends, but when Ted begins to take advantage, Charlie loses his cool and challenges him to a tennis match.
76	3	"Granny Get Your Gun"	Martin Shardlow	Gene Braunstein	20 January 1995
Caroline's domineering grandmother comes to stay and announces she will prevent her marriage to Charlie. She suggests a pre-nuptial agreement, and once the solicitors are brought in the negotiations soon turn into a slanging match.
77	4	"Surgical Spirit"	Martin Shardlow	S: Joe Fisch, T: David Lesser	27 January 1995
Caroline is forced to take in her mother when Laura's flat is damaged by fire.
78	5	"Father of the Bride (Part 1)"	Martin Shardlow	Danny Kallis, Phil Doran, Bob Rosenfarb and Clay Graham	3 February 1995
Joanna brings her new boyfriend home to meet her father and announces that they are engaged.
79	6	"Father of the Bride (Part 2)"	Martin Shardlow	Phil Doran, Bob Rosenfarb, Clay Graham and Danny Kallis	10 February 1995
Joanna and her new-found fiancé, Dan, elope to Gretna Green, but are followed by their relatives who drive through the night to catch them.
80	7	"Married... With Parents"	Martin Shardlow	Gene Braunstein	17 February 1995
Newly-weds Joanna and Dan are back from their honeymoon, but the university has thrown them out of the halls of residence, and they move in with Charlie and Caroline. The idea of Joanna and Dan sharing a bed keeps Charlie awake at night.
81	8	"No Place Like Home"	Martin Shardlow	T: Linda Va Salle and Mike Teverbaugh; S: Clay Graham and Michele J. Wolff	24 February 1995
A visitor to the house offers a significant sum to sell up so Charlie and Caroline go house-hunting.
82	9	"Hard Times"	Martin Shardlow	Gene Braunstein and Michele J. Wolff	3 March 1995
Caroline's business goes through a bad patch and she uses money from the household account to support it. Charlie's shopping cheque bounces, and he imposes an economy drive on the family. Caroline, however, cannot stop spending money.
83	10	"Hit the Road"	Martin Shardlow	Deborah Leschin and Barry Vigon	10 March 1995
Tom tries to impress a girlfriend from school by using Charlie's jeep despite the fact that he is too young to drive legally.
84	11	"Home Improvement"	Martin Shardlow	Bob Rosenfarb, Clay Graham, Danny Kallis and Phil Doran	17 March 1995
When a water leak in the ceiling downstairs is traced to Caroline's bedroom, Charlie decides it would be a good time to give the whole bedroom a makeover.
85	12	"Quantum Leap"	Martin Shardlow	Michele J. Wolff	24 March 1995
Charlie is knocked out and dreams that he has remained a football player with all the money and trappings associated with it.
86	13	"Second Thoughts"	Martin Shardlow	Adam Lapidus	31 March 1995
Charlie has an allergic reaction every time he is forced to think about getting married.
87	14	"The Wedding"	Martin Shardlow	Blake Hunter and Martin Cohan	8 April 1995
Double-length episode. It is Charlie and Caroline's wedding day and everything that can go wrong, does go wrong.

=== Series 7 (1996) ===
No. overall	No. in series	Title	Directed by	Written by	Original release date
88	1	"A Lion Called Laura"	Michael Owen Morris	Colin Bostock-Smith	2 September 1996
Charlie and Caroline are happily married and facing their first nights apart as Caroline goes to Brussels for work. But she feels upset. Little does she know that Charlie has a surprise awaiting her return.
89	2	"Friends"	Michael Owen Morris	Colin Bostock-Smith	9 September 1996
Charlie and Caroline reminisce about their honeymoon.
90	3	"In Marriage We Trust"	Michael Owen Morris	Karen Wengrod and Ken Cinnamon	16 September 1996
Caroline invites a man-eating friend, Emma (Louise Jameson) for dinner; Laura's date turns out to be Caroline's former boyfriend from university. Jealousy threatens to mar the evening - until Charlie and Caroline trust their marriage.
91	4	"The Chunnel of Love"	Michael Owen Morris	Martin Cohan and Blake Hunter	23 September 1996
Dan gets a job in Paris but Jo does not want to go. Charlie cannot resist interfering - for better, or for worse.
92	5	"Nobody's Child"	Michael Owen Smith	Colin Bostock-Smith	30 September 1996
Laura is feeling neglected and unloved - until old friend Dolly (Millicent Martin) turns up and invites her on a world tour. But two stars in one small room means Star Wars.
93	6	"A Couple of Charlies"	Michael Owen Morris	Gene Braunstein and Bob Perlow	7 October 1996
Charlie meets an old girlfriend now married to another Charlie. His insecurities mounting, this Charlie challenges Charlie at pool. One Charlie wins, one loses, and both discover new depths to their marriages.
94	7	"Oh Baby, Oh Baby"	Michael Owen Morris	Karen Wengrod and Ken Cinnamon	14 October 1996
Charlie and Caroline are still trying for a baby. The pregnancy test is positive - but whose is it? Caroline's? Or Joanna's?
