= One of the Boys (1989 TV series) =

American television sitcom

- Genre: Sitcom
- Created by: Blake Hunter; Martin Cohan
- Developed by: Tom Palmer
- Starring: María Conchita Alonso; Robert Clohessy; Amy Aquino; Michael DeLuise; Billy Morrissette; Justin Whalin; Dan Hedaya
- Theme music composer: Bob Ezrin; Michael Tavera
- Composer: Jonathan Wolff
- Country of origin: United States
- Original language: English
- No. of seasons: 1
- No. of episodes: 6

Production
- Executive producers: Martin Cohan; Blake Hunter; Fred Silverman
- Production companies: ELP Communications; Stiefel-Philips Entertainment; The Fred Silverman Company; Hunter-Cohan Productions; Columbia Pictures Television

Original release
- Network: NBC
- Release: April 15 – May 20, 1989

One of the Boys is an American sitcom created by Blake Hunter and Martin Cohan that aired six episodes on NBC from April 15 to May 20, 1989. It was one of only a few United States prime time programs of the 1980s to feature a Latin American woman—María Conchita Alonso—as a leading actress. She plays Maria Conchita Navarro, a Venezuelan immigrant to the United States who begins working in the office of a small construction company and marries its widowed owner, Mike Lukowski (Robert Clohessy). Five production companies, led by Columbia Pictures Television, oversaw filming at Sunset Gower Studios in Hollywood, where delays prevented critics from watching a preview in advance of the premiere. Critical reviews were poor to middling. The mid-season replacement received inconsistent Nielsen ratings and was not renewed for a second season by NBC.

== Cast and characters ==
One of the Boys has seven main characters. Top row: Luke Lukowski, Steve Lukowski, Ernie. Bottom row: Nick Lukowski, Maria Conchita Navarro, Mike Lukowski, Bernice DeSalvo.

The sitcom One of the Boys follows Maria Conchita Navarro (María Conchita Alonso), a Venezuelan immigrant to the United States pursuing the American Dream by leaving her job as a waitress and becoming a bookkeeper at the Lukowski Construction Company, located in the New York City borough of Queens. The actress and character are similar in name, personality, and country of origin. David Walstad of The Philadelphia Inquirer described Navarro as Alonso's alter ego, The Miami Herald's Juan Carlos Coto deemed her autobiographical, and Alonso said "the character is just like" her. In contrast to the stereotypical portrayal of Latin Americans as poor and uneducated, Navarro is a clever woman with class who speaks English. She is from a well-off family but wants to achieve her goals without their assistance, which is exemplified in her opinionated nature and motorcycle riding. According to Alonso, Navarro is a "full of life, tomboyish, yet feminine" woman. Amy Aquino plays her best friend Bernice DeSalvo, (Note: Sources differ regarding the surname of Aquino's character. Brooks & Marsh (2007) and Leszczak (2016) list it as "DeSalvo" while Polson (1989) gives "DiSalvo".) a waitress the actress considered a wisecracker who "has trouble getting dates".

Navarro's love interest is Mike Lukowski (Robert Clohessy), the small business owner of the Lukowski Construction Company and recently widowed father of three boys: 20-year-old Luke Lukowski (Michael DeLuise), 18-year-old Steve Lukowski (Billy Morrissette), and 13-year-old Nick Lukowski (Justin Whalin). Luke works on the company's job sites with foreman Ernie (Dan Hedaya) while Steve and Nick attend school. Mike and Maria's relationship quickly becomes romantic and they wed in the fifth episode.

== Background ==
Few lead roles existed for Latin American women on late 1980s prime time television in the United States. While I Married Dora—a sitcom featuring a Central American woman who marries her American employer—aired in 1987, it garnered low ratings. Television network NBC sought to expand its comedy programming by broadcasting new series starring Latin Americans such as Alonso, who made her United States television debut on One of the Boys. The Venezuelan singer and actress had received two Grammy Award nominations and starred in the films Moscow on the Hudson (1984) and The Running Man (1987). Alonso was initially averse to acting on television because the films she was doing gave her freedom to explore other opportunities after a couple of months. Following years of rejecting her manager's insistence she enter the field, Alonso signed with television producer Fred Silverman in 1988, who thought she could equal the success Roseanne Barr achieved on Roseanne. Alonso took the lead role in One of the Boys because she saw herself in the lead character and thought she could receive better movie roles afterward.

== Production ==
Tom Palmer developed the series while Silverman executive produced it with creators Blake Hunter and Martin Cohan, who worked on the ABC television series Who's the Boss? Bob Ezrin and Michael Tavera wrote the theme music while Jonathan Wolff composed other sound effects, and Castle Bryant Johnsen designed the title sequence. ELP Communications, Stiefel-Philips Entertainment, The Fred Silverman Company, Hunter-Cohan Productions, and Columbia Pictures Television managed the show's production.

Originally scheduled to start in late February 1989, filming began in mid-March before an audience at Sunset Gower Studios in Hollywood. Episode tapings occurred on Tuesdays following six days of rehearsals. Script issues plagued production, and the premiere was filmed again one week before its broadcast. To prevent viewers from thinking of her as "another actress trying to sing", Alonso kept her singing career separate from the show and does not sing in it.

== Episodes ==
No.	Title	Directed by	Written by	Original release date	U.S. viewers (millions)	Rating/share (households) (Note: "Rating" represents the percentage of American households with a television watching an episode during any given minute of its broadcast while "share" represents the percentage of American households with a television in use watching an episode during any given minute of its broadcast.)
1	"The Meeting"	Will Mackenzie	Teleplay by : Tom Palmer; Story by : Blake Hunter & Martin Cohan & Tom Palmer	April 15, 1989	23.7	16.3/29
Mike hires Maria as a bookkeeper at his construction company. She gets acquainted with Luke, Steve, and Nick at their home.
2	"The Dance"	Unknown	Lawrence Gay & Michael DiGaetano	April 22, 1989	14.4	10.6/22
Mike receives an award at a banquet but attends with another woman instead of Maria. She attends with another man, and they regret not going together.
3	"The Date"	John Whitesell	Dava Savel	April 29, 1989	12.9	9.4/19
Mike and Maria get robbed on their first date. Luke, Steve, and Nick arrive at a bar to save Mike after he gets in a fight.
4	"The Proposal"	Unknown	Gina Wendkos	May 6, 1989	17.0	12.1/22
Luke, Steve, and Nick attend a baseball game while Mike and Maria have a romantic dinner. When the sons arrive back home early, they find Mike and Maria's relationship has become intimate.
5	"The Wedding"	Unknown	Richard Albrecht & Casey Keller	May 13, 1989	18.3	12.7/26
Mike and Maria get married. She quits her job at the company because Mike refuses to let her become the only woman on his construction crew.
6	"Maria Conchita Lukowski"	John Whitesell	Richard Albrecht & Casey Keller	May 20, 1989	14.7	10.5/21
Luke dislikes Maria moving in to the Lukowski house.

== Broadcast history ==
One of the Boys received little publicity before its premiere; the production delays prevented critics from watching a preview. A mid-season replacement for NBC in the 1988–89 United States television season, the show would air a second season starting in September 1989 if its trial run was well-received. The sitcom debuted at 9:30 p.m. ET on Saturday, April 15, 1989, following The Golden Girls in what The Palm Beach Post described as a "solid gold ratings spot". It then moved up to 8 p.m. for two weeks—"a much more difficult ratings spot" according to the Wisconsin State Journal—taking the regular time slot of 227. The last three episodes aired at 8:30 p.m. leading into The Golden Girls. Aside from NBC, the program aired on BCTV in the Canadian province of British Columbia.

The Los Angeles Times Syndicate deemed the premiere's performance as one of the top 20 highest-rated prime time programs in the week it aired "respectable". After the second episode only made the top 50, Tom Green of USA Today said the show's ratings "results haven't been that good". The six episodes ranked 17th, 49th, 55th, 42nd, 37th, and 48th, respectively. NBC canceled One of the Boys on May 15, 1989, as it announced a schedule for the 1989–90 television season. According to Alonso, it was not renewed because the network "didn't think it would be a long-running hit". Clohessy remarked their "on-screen relationship ... would have kept evolving" if a second season were filmed, and Aquino's character would have assumed the role of bookkeeper at the company.

== Critical reception ==
One of the Boys's concept and writing were subject to critical commentary. King Features Syndicate's Steven H. Scheuer and Don Davies of the Wisconsin State Journal considered both aspects ordinary. According to Variety, the series simply "reintroduce[s] the theme of the single parent raising his kids". A writer for The Kingston Whig-Standard thought the program was predictable because they felt Mike and Maria seemed destined for marriage by the end of the first episode. Hester Riches of the Vancouver Sun said it was "certainly not worth staying home Saturday night to catch".

Critics also commented on Alonso's acting. Scheuer stated she was funnier than her script, and Riches remarked she makes the show "genuinely funny". According to Davies, Alonso "manages switcheroos on tired plotlines". In contrast, Variety considered her enthusiasm unconvincing.
