= Living Dolls =

1989 American television sitcom

- Genre: Sitcom
- Created by: Ross Brown
- Starring: Michael Learned; Leah Remini; Deborah Tucker; Alison Elliott; Halle Berry; David Moscow
- Theme music composer: John Beasley; John Vester
- Opening theme: "Take Your Best Shot"
- Composer: Jonathan Wolff
- Country of origin: United States
- Original language: English
- No. of seasons: 1
- No. of episodes: 13

Production
- Executive producers: Ross Brown; Martin Cohan; Phyllis Glick; Blake Hunter
- Producers: R.J. Colleary; Martha Williamson
- Running time: 22–24 minutes
- Production companies: ELP Communications; Columbia Pictures Television

Original release
- Network: ABC
- Release: September 26 – December 30, 1989

Related
- Who's the Boss?

Living Dolls is an American television sitcom that aired on ABC from September 26 to December 30, 1989. Created by Ross Brown (who served as a writer and creative consultant during the fifth season of its parent series), it was a spin-off of Who's the Boss?, and featured characters introduced in the fifth-season episode of the same title that served as the show's backdoor pilot. The show was primarily notable for being Halle Berry’s first acting role. Both Who's the Boss? and Living Dolls were productions of Columbia Pictures Television for ABC.

== Synopsis ==
The show featured Charlie Briscoe (Leah Remini), a friend of Samantha Micelli (the Who's the Boss? character played by Alyssa Milano). Samantha is dabbling in a modeling career and Charlie, a friend from Samantha's old Brooklyn neighborhood, comes to visit. While doing some test shots for a dog food commercial, it is discovered that Charlie is very photogenic. Charlie is then befriended by the owner of a modeling agency for teenage girls, Trish Carlin (Michael Learned). Trish is also a friend of advertising executive Angela Bower, one of the main characters on Who's the Boss? Trish becomes a mother figure to Charlie and the other models.

== Production and reception ==
Living Dolls began as a back-door pilot on Who's the Boss? that aired in March 1989. In the backdoor pilot, Vivica A. Fox portrayed Emily and Jonathan Ward portrayed Rick. Executives disliked the original cast, and held auditions for recasting when the pilot was picked up to series in May. Halle Berry replaced Fox in the series, while David Moscow was cast to replace Ward. The backdoor pilot was reaired in September as an episode of Living Dolls.

In a later interview, Michael Learned recalled writers were inconsistent in writing her character, saying "I was told that she was supposed to be... kind of a tough cookie, and so that's what I understood was what they wanted in my character, when in truth what they wanted was Charlotte Rae in Facts of Life. Learned also felt that producers were planning to replace her with Marion Ross, who guest starred in the final two episodes. During the filming of one episode, Berry collapsed on the set and went into a coma; she was diagnosed with Type 1 Diabetes shortly thereafter.

Upon its debut, the series was panned by critics and received mostly negative reviews. It was the only series to receive an "F" grade by People magazine in its 1989 fall preview issue. Learned later criticized producers for underutilizing Berry. ABC canceled the series after 12 episodes in December 1989.

== Cast ==
- Michael Learned as Patricia "Trish" Carlin
- Leah Remini as Charlene "Charlie" Briscoe
- Deborah Tucker as Caroline Weldon (played by Melissa Willis in the backdoor pilot)
- Alison Elliott as Martha Lambert
- Halle Berry as Emily Franklin (played by Vivica A. Fox in the backdoor pilot)
- David Moscow as Eric "Rick" Carlin (played by Jonathan Ward in the backdoor pilot)

== Episodes ==
No.	Title	Directed by	Written by	Original release date
1	"Living Dolls"	John Sgueglia	Ross Brown	September 26, 1989 (Note: Originally aired as an episode of Who's the Boss? on March 29, 1989.)
2	"It's All Done with Mirrors"	John Sgueglia	Ross Brown	September 26, 1989
3	"It's My Party"	John Sgueglia	Eric Gilliland	September 30, 1989
4	"Martha Means Well"	Lee Bernhardi	R.J. Colleary	October 7, 1989
5	"Seeing Is Believing"	Lee Bernhardi	Matt Ember	October 21, 1989
6	"Guess Who's Not Coming to Dinner"	Andy Cadiff	R.J. Colleary	November 4, 1989
7	"Rick's Model Girlfriend"	Lee Bernhardi	James Gates	November 11, 1989
8	"The Not So Sweet Smell of Success"	Andy Cadiff	Mark C. Miller	November 18, 1989
9	"The Flash Is Always Greener"	Jonathan Weiss	Martha Williamson	November 25, 1989
10	"He's Ba-aack!"	Valentine Mayer	Eric Gilliland & Martha Williamson	December 2, 1989
11	"'C' Is for Model"	Lee Bernhardi	Martha Williamson	December 9, 1989
12	"And I Thought Modeling Was Hard"	James Widdoes	Ross Brown & R.J. Colleary	December 16, 1989
13	"Beauty and the Beat"	James Widdoes	Susan Sebastian & Diana Ayers	December 30, 1989
