= There Goes the Bride =

There Goes the Bride may refer to:

- There Goes the Bride (1932 film)
- There Goes the Bride (1980 film)
- There Goes the Bride (play), by John Chapman and Ray Cooney
- "There Goes the Bride", Who's the Boss? season 4 episode
