= Magic Valley (film) =

- Directed by: Jaffe Zinn
- Written by: Jaffe Zinn
- Produced by: Heather Rae
- Starring: Scott Glenn; Kyle Gallner; Alison Elliott; Brad William Henke; Matthew Gray Gubler; Will Estes
- Edited by: Jaffe Zinn
- Music by: Mads Heldtberg; Steve Damstra II
- Production companies: Prominent Pictures; Hazard Filmworks; Foxxtale Productions
- Release dates: 31 October 2011 (Rome Film Festival); 9 April 2013 (VOD)
- Running time: 85 minutes
- Country: United States
- Language: English

Magic Valley is a 2011 American drama film directed by Jaffe Zinn, starring Scott Glenn, Kyle Gallner, Alison Elliott, Brad William Henke, Matthew Gray Gubler and Will Estes.

== Cast ==
- Scott Glenn as Ed Halfner
- Kyle Gallner as T.J. Waggs
- Alison Elliott as Martha Garabrant
- Brad William Henke as Jerry Garabrant
- Matthew Gray Gubler as Mok
- Will Estes as Jimmy Duvante
- Daniel Frandson as Chad
- Landon Abercrombie as Jason
- Johnny Lewis as John

== Release ==
The film premiered at the Rome Film Festival on 31 October 2011. The film was released to VOD on 9 April 2013.

== Reception ==
Ronnie Scheib of Variety wrote that the film "puts its unique stamp on a ubiquitous dead-child theme".

Jordan Mintzer of The Hollywood Reporter praised the performances of Glenn and Henke while writing that the film is "not quite the sum of its parts" and "never builds into either a nail-biting investigation nor into a truly captivating mediation on life and death in America’s heartland" despite "many well-executed sequences".
