= The Upper Hand =

English TV sitcom (1990–1996)

- Genre: Sitcom
- Created by: Martin Cohan; Blake Hunter
- Starring: Joe McGann; Diana Weston; Honor Blackman; Kellie Bright; William Puttock
- Country of origin: United Kingdom
- Original language: English
- No. of series: 7
- No. of episodes: 94 (list of episodes)

Production
- Production location: Television House
- Running time: 25 minutes
- Production companies: Central (seasons 1–5); Central/Carlton Productions (seasons 6–7); Columbia Pictures Television

Original release
- Network: ITV
- Release: 1 May 1990 – 14 October 1996

Related
- Who's the Boss?

The Upper Hand is a British television sitcom with dramatic elements broadcast by ITV. The show ran from 1 May 1990 to 14 October 1996 for a total of 94 episodes in seven series. Faithfully adapted from the American sitcom Who's the Boss?, except for the UK setting, it used the original scripts and a near identical studio set typical of American sitcoms, right down to the sofa facing the audience and the swing door leading to the kitchen, and the use of a guest star in each episode.

As in the former series, affluent single woman Caroline Wheatley (Diana Weston), raising her son with the help of her mother Laura West (Honor Blackman), hires a housekeeper, and a man called Charlie Burrows (Joe McGann) applies for the job.

== Premise ==
Down on his luck, former footballer Charlie Burrows moves from a deprived area of London to leafy Henley-on-Thames in Oxfordshire to make a better life for his teenage daughter Joanna, by taking a job as housekeeper for well-off advertising executive Caroline Wheatley. Although Caroline is unsure about employing him, her man-eating ageing mother Laura West talks her into it. Soon, the two become friends, Caroline's son Tom comes to see Charlie as a father figure, and Joanna enjoys having a female influence in her life following the premature death of her mother.

Both Caroline and Charlie repeatedly attempt to find love elsewhere, denying their blossoming feelings for each other. For years, they lead viewers on a "will-they-won't-they" chase that lasts until the end of the sixth series when the pair marry. After initial plans to end the series there, ITV commissioned a seventh series featuring Charlie and Caroline as husband and wife, which went beyond the premise of the original American version.

== Cast and characters ==
=== Main ===
- Charlie Burrows (Joe McGann) - A former footballer whose career was curtailed by injury, Charlie is also a single dad to daughter Joanna since his wife Debbie's death. Down on his luck and living in a deprived area of London, Charlie takes a housekeeper's job in Henley-on-Thames to give Joanna a better life. Confident, charming and something of a joker, he is a contrast to the more serious Caroline and helps to loosen her up over time. A running joke is that, while Charlie sees himself very much as a traditional man, he enthusiastically embraces a stereotypically female job and its tasks.
- Caroline Wheatley (Diana Weston) - A successful advertising executive who, while confident in the business world, struggles in her personal life. Separated from her unreliable husband, Caroline shares her life with her son Tom (whom she over-indulges) and her young-at-heart mother Laura, who constantly tries to find her daughter a man. She is somewhat buttoned-up, but begins to take a more relaxed approach to life under Charlie's influence.
- Laura West (Honor Blackman) - Caroline's glamorous and young-at-heart mother who lives in an annexe of her daughter's house. Something of a man-eater, she dates a string of different men throughout the course of the series. It is Laura who initially hires Charlie, mainly because of his looks, but when she spots the chemistry between him and Caroline she does everything she can to encourage a relationship between them. Although Laura frequently makes cracks at Caroline's expense, she genuinely loves her daughter and can be very protective of her.
- Joanna Burrows (Kellie Bright) - Charlie's daughter; an outgoing, confident girl who is something of a tomboy in early episodes, but becomes more typically "girly" as she reaches her teens. She initially resents Caroline, finding her stuck-up, but comes to appreciate having a woman around as she goes through puberty. Just as Caroline is influenced by Charlie, Jo's confidence rubs off on Tom.
- Tom Wheatley (William Puttock) - Caroline's son, whom she over-indulges somewhat to compensate for the lack of his father's presence. Although academically intelligent beyond his years, Tom is socially naïve and struggles to make friends. He comes to see Charlie, who encourages him in more typically "boyish" pursuits, such as football, as a father figure, as well as becoming close to Jo (although she often treats him as an annoyance as she gets older).

=== Minor and recurring ===
- Michael Wheatley (originally Nicky Henson, later Neil McCaul) - Caroline's unreliable estranged (later ex-) husband; a documentary maker who spends most of his time in the jungle. The two briefly attempt a reconciliation, but this fails when Michael struggles to settle down. He later remarries and plans to fight for custody of Tom, until his much younger wife Tiffany decides she is not ready for motherhood.
- Nick Murray (Anthony Newley) - Joanna's maternal grandfather, who has a difficult relationship with Charlie, having never believed him good enough for his late daughter Debbie. A shady character, Nick spends time in prison for fraud; this revelation upsets Jo, because Charlie had told her that her grandfather had moved to Spain.
- Auntie Pat (Lynda Baron) - Charlie's godmother; a lively, kind-hearted woman with a habit of pinching people's cheeks in greeting (to the point that other characters instinctively protect their faces on seeing her).
- Al (Charlie Creed-Miles) - Auntie Pat's uncle (although several years younger than her). A former young offender, he attempts to turn his life around by training as a hairdresser. Charlie takes him under his wing, but is less keen on having him around when he spots an attraction between Al and Jo.
- Katie (Joanna Forest)
- Tom (Jack Bernhardt) - An easily confused handyman who has a brief affair with Laura.
- Dan Thatcher (Robert Beck) - Jo's fellow student who she marries.

== Theme tune ==
The theme music was written by Debbie Wiseman. A piano version of the theme titled Joe & Diana was released in 2011 on her album Piano Stories.

== Episodes ==
Series	Episodes	Originally released	
Series	Episodes	First released	Last released
1	13	1 May 1990	27 December 1990
2	12	18 February 1991	20 May 1991
3	13	5 November 1991	11 February 1992
4	19	20 October 1992	22 February 1993
5	16	9 September 1993	23 December 1993
6	14	6 January 1995	8 April 1995
7	7	2 September 1996	14 October 1996

== Home media ==
The Upper Hand was first released on VHS format in the United Kingdom, where three volumes containing various episodes were made available from Columbia Tristar Home Entertainment. All seven series of The Upper Hand have been released in 2010 and 2011 in the United Kingdom via Network.

VHS

Title	Episodes	# Tapes	Release date	BBFC rating	Ref.
Volume 1: The Best of Series I & II	"Just the Job" "Caroline's First Fight" "Wedding Bells (Part 1)" "Wedding Bells (Part 2)"	1	16 January 1995	PG	
Volume 2: Caroline & Charlie's Romance	"First Kiss" "The Anniversary" "Tunnel of Love" "Happy Ever After? (Part 2)"	1	6 March 1995	PG	
Volume 3: The Wedding	"The Wedding"	1	1995	PG	

DVD

Title	Episodes	# Discs	Release date	BBFC rating	Ref.
The Complete First Series	13	2	18 January 2010	PG	
The Complete Second Series	12	2	10 May 2010	PG	
The Complete Third Series	13	2	26 July 2010	PG	
The Complete Fourth Series	19	3	27 September 2010	PG	
The Complete Fifth Series	16	2	25 October 2010	PG	
The Complete Sixth Series	14	2	24 January 2011	PG	
The Complete Seventh Series	7	1	20 June 2011	PG	
The Complete Series	94	14	8 December 2014	PG	
