= Jonathan Ward (actor) =

American actor

- Occupation: Actor
- Years active: 1982–1998 or 1999
- Spouse: Jamie
- Children: 2

Jonathan Ward is an American retired actor. He has starred mostly in television series and television films, but has also appeared in a small number of feature films, including the critically maligned 1988 cult film Mac and Me and Steel Magnolias in 1989. His acting debut was on Broadway as Michael in Peter Pan.

== Career ==
Ward was 12 years old when he appeared in the 1982 telefilm Maid in America, his first on-screen acting role. His television credits include Charles in Charge, Heart of the City, The New Adventures of Beans Baxter, Beauty and the Beast, In the Heat of the Night, Parker Lewis Can't Lose, Grace Under Fire, The Twilight Zone, and the short-lived Who's the Boss spin-off Living Dolls. His film appearances include White Water Summer, Mac and Me, Steel Magnolias, FernGully: The Last Rainforest and Geronimo: An American Legend. He has written two documentaries and produced a documentary series titled Great Books. He retired from acting at age 28.

== Personal life ==
Since 1995, Ward and his wife Jamie have been co-owners of a repair and restoration shop called TLC: Toyota Land Cruisers in Van Nuys, California.
