= Alison Elliott =

American actress (born 1970)

- Born: May 19, 1970 (age 55); San Francisco, California, U.S.
- Occupation: Actress
- Years active: 1989–present

Alison Elliott (born May 19, 1970) is an American actress. She was nominated for a Screen Actors Guild Award for the 1997 film The Wings of the Dove. Her other film appearances include The Spitfire Grill (1996), Birth (2004), The Assassination of Jesse James by the Coward Robert Ford (2007) and 20th Century Women (2016).

== Early life ==
Elliott was born in San Francisco, California, the daughter of Barbara, a teacher of nursing, and Bob Elliott, a computer executive. She moved with her family to Tokyo when she was four years old, and moved back to San Francisco when she was eight, where she later attended the Urban School of San Francisco, an independent arts high school.

== Career ==
At 14, Elliott began her modeling career with Ford Models, and in 1989, she moved to Los Angeles to star as a teen-aged model on the TV sitcom Living Dolls (1989).

Elliott is known for the films The Underneath (1995), The Spitfire Grill (1996), The Wings of the Dove (1997) (for which she received Supporting Actress nominations for both a Screen Actors Guild Award and Boston Society of Film Critics Award, and a win from the Las Vegas Film Critics Society), The Miracle Worker (2000), and Birth (2004). She also portrayed Virginia "Jinny" St. George in the BBC mini-series production of Edith Wharton's The Buccaneers (1995).

In 2007's critically acclaimed western The Assassination of Jesse James by the Coward Robert Ford, Elliott appeared alongside Brad Pitt, Casey Affleck, Sam Rockwell and Paul Schneider in the role of Martha Bolton, the older sister of Robert Ford.

In addition to her film and television roles, Elliott has narrated multiple audio books, including Belle Prater's Boy by Ruth White and its sequel, The Search for Belle Prater.

== Filmography ==
=== Film ===
Year	Title	Role	Notes
1994	Monkey Trouble	Tessa	
1994	Wyatt Earp	Lou Earp	
1995	The Underneath	Rachel	
1996	The Spitfire Grill	Percy Talbott	
1997	The Wings of the Dove	Milly	
1998	The Eternal	Nora / Niamh	
2003	Red Betsy	Winifred Rounds	
2003	12	Marie-Noel	
2004	Birth	Laura	
2006	Griffin & Phoenix	Terry	
2007	The Assassination of Jesse James by the Coward Robert Ford	Martha Bolton	
2011	Magic Valley	Martha Garabrant	
2016	The Phenom	Susan Gibson	
2016	20th Century Women	Julie's Mother	
2017	Counting for Thunder	Sis Stalworth	
2017	Lean on Pete	Aunt Margy	

=== Television ===
Year	Title	Role	Notes
1989	Who's the Boss?	Martha Lambert	Episode: "Living Dolls"
1989	Living Dolls	Martha Lambert	12 episodes
1990	ABC Afterschool Special	Cindy	Episode: "The Perfect Date"
1993	Black Tie Affair	Eve Saskatchewan	5 episodes
1995	The Buccaneers	Virginia St. George	6 episodes
1995	Indictment: The McMartin Trial	Peggy Ann Buckey	Television film
2000	The Miracle Worker	Anne Sullivan	Television film
2001	The Song of the Lark	Thea Kronborg	Television film
2003	A Wrinkle in Time	Mrs. Who	Television film
2003	ER	Paula Martin	Episode: "Out of Africa"
2006	A House Divided	Ruth	Television film
2008	Long Island Confidential	Kate Larkin	Television film
2008–2009	Law & Order	Rita Shalvoy	3 episodes
2010	Terriers	Laura Ross	4 episodes
2013	Hello Ladies	Nicole Morgan	Episode: "The Wedding"
2020–2021	Servant	Aunt May	3 episodes
