= Bud Wiser =

American director, producer and screenwriter

- Born: May 20, 1929; Rochester, New York, U.S.
- Died: April 16, 2017 (aged 87); Studio City, California, U.S.
- Occupations: Director, producer, screenwriter
- Spouse: Christine Z. Wiser
- Children: 1

Bernard "Bud" Wiser (May 20, 1929 – April 16, 2017) was an American director, producer and screenwriter. He directed, produced and wrote for documentary television film The World of Animals: Big Cats, Little Cats.

Wiser also worked as a writer/producer on television programs, as his credits includes, One Day at a Time, The Practice, Dear John, Who's the Boss?, All in the Family, Rhoda, Charles in Charge, Chico and the Man, Growing Pains, The New Lassie, Coach and That's My Mama. He died in April 2017 at his home in Studio City, California, at the age of 87.
