= Richard Albrecht =

English actor, director, producer and writer

- Born: 1950 (age 75–76); Manchester, Lancashire, England
- Occupations: Actor, director,

Richard Albrecht (born 1950) is an English actor, director, His work include all facets of British theatrical life: commercials, corporates, film, narration, television, theatre and voice-over.

Trained at the E15 Acting School (1967–70), he then went into repertory theatre at Oldham, Lincoln, Birmingham, Nottingham, Newcastle, Leicester, Greenwich, Colchester, Salisbury and Cheltenham; touring theatre with Pentabus, Bristol Express, Monstrous Regiment, Shared Experience; Fringe Theatre with the Combination, Soho Poly, Traverse, Young Vic, Stratford East, and a one-man show, RIP Maria Callas at the Edinburgh Festival. In the West End, he appeared in Happy as a Sandbag. Albrecht appeared at the Royal Court Theatre in Ashes and Sand and My Child.

His TV appearances include Coronation Street, EastEnders, Casualty, The Bill, King Lear, Threads, Doctors, Agatha Christie's Poirot, Heartbeat, Where The Heart is and Holby City.

Albrecht's films include Jude, The Man Who Cried and The Glasshouse. His voice work includes narrating Wainwright-the Man Who Loved the Lakes, 17 episodes of Extraordinary Animals and the kids cartoon/film of Badly Drawn Roy. Latest theatre appearance was in Independent Means at the Library Theatre, Manchester.

Albrecht was also one of the three actors who started the second actors co-operative Agency, after Actorum, (in 1976) which as A C Management ran for 15 years.

== Filmography ==
- Walking with the Enemy (2013)
- The Man Who Cried
- Jude
