= John Donley =

American writer

John Donley is a writer from Gould, Arkansas.

Donley wrote for many sitcoms including Sanford and Son, Good Times, The Jeffersons, Diff'rent Strokes, Benson and Who's the Boss. He won an NAACP Image Award for best situation comedy in 1984. In 2019 he was inducted into the Arkansas Black Hall of Fame.

== Career ==
The first script Donley sold was Black Jesus, which was the second episode of Good Times. In 1984, his episode Roots on the comedy Diff’rent Strokes earned him an NAACP Image Award for Best Situation Comedy Episode.
