= Martin Cohan =

American producer and screenwriter (1932–2010)

- Born: Martin Paul Cohan; July 4, 1932; San Francisco, California, U.S.
- Died: May 19, 2010 (aged 77); Pacific Palisades, California, U.S.
- Resting place: Mount Sinai Memorial Park Cemetery
- Education: Stanford University
- Occupations: Television producer, screenwriter
- Relatives: Rhoda Gemignani (sister)
- Writing career
- Notable work: Who's the Boss?

Martin Paul Cohan (July 4, 1932 – May 19, 2010), credited as Marty Cohan, was an American television producer and screenwriter. He co-created the sitcom Who's the Boss?, which aired on the American Broadcasting Company (ABC) from 1984 to 1992, with business partner Blake Hunter. Cohan is also credited with creating Silver Spoons, which ran on the National Broadcasting Company NBC from September 25, 1982, to May 11, 1986, and in first-run syndication from September 27, 1986, to May 30, 1987 and launched the career of actor Ricky Schroder.

== Biography ==
=== Early life ===
Cohan was born in San Francisco, California, on July 4, 1932. He graduated from Lowell High School before attending Stanford University as a pre-law major. He worked several jobs to put himself through school, suffering injuries that required back surgery. After the surgery, he changed his major to drama. He received a bachelor's degree in theater arts in 1955.

=== Career ===
Cohan began working as a stage manager and assistant director at ABC after his graduation from Stanford University. He worked in film and documentaries during this stage in his career, including the 1970 film, Catch-22, directed by Mike Nichols. Cohan created a documentary called The Children of Paris before taking a position in a documentary firm owned by David L. Wolper. Cohan's work as a writer and researcher for the documentaries Hollywood and the Stars in 1963 and Let My People Go: The Story of Israel in 1965 also led to a job working in Universal Television's documentary department.

During the 1970s, Cohan transitioned to writing for sitcoms, including All in the Family and The Odd Couple. In 1971, he achieved professional recognition as an assistant director on The Mary Tyler Moore Show. He was awarded the best comedy episode award from the Writers Guild of America for his screenwriting on the show in 1972. Cohan was also the recipient of an NAACP award for furthering interracial understanding during the 1970s. After leaving The Mary Tyler Moore Show, Cohan directed, produced, and wrote for The Bob Newhart Show and was co-producer of The Ted Knight Show.

Martin Cohan was the co-producer/co-executive producer from 1979 to 1985 on Diff'rent Strokes. In the early 1980s, he created the sitcom Silver Spoons, starring Ricky Schroder, which ran from 1982 to 1987. He also co-created Who's the Boss? with business partner Blake Hunter. The sitcom, starring Tony Danza, Judith Light, Alyssa Milano, Danny Pintauro and Katherine Helmond, ran from 1984 to 1992. Cohan's sister, actress Rhoda Gemignani, had a recurring role as Mrs. Rossini on the show. Cohan and Hunter also worked as creative consultants on The Upper Hand, the British version of Who's the Boss?, that debuted in 1990 and aired for seven seasons on the ITV network in the United Kingdom.

Cohan also penned scripts for episodes of numerous other television shows, including Love, American Style and The Love Boat.

Martin Cohan died at his home in Pacific Palisades, California, of large-cell lymphoma on May 19, 2010, at the age of 77. He was survived by his wife, Dawn, a son, a daughter, two stepchildren, a step-grandson, and a sister. His memorial service was held at Mt. Sinai's Chapel Tenach in Forest Lawn.

Cohan's longtime business partner, Blake Hunter, was quoted in Variety as saying: "Marty is the brother I wish I had, the talent I stood in awe of, and the friend I can never replace."
