= Blake Hunter =

American television producer and writer (born 1934)

Blake Hunter (born January 17, 1934) is an American television producer and writer. He is best known as the co-creator of the sitcom Who's the Boss?, which aired on ABC from 1984 until 1992 and which co-starred Tony Danza and Judith Light, in 1984 with business partner Martin "Marty" Cohan.

Hunter previously wrote episodes of other television shows, including WKRP in Cincinnati and Diff'rent Strokes. He later worked as creative consultant on The Upper Hand, the British version of Who's the Boss? which debuted in 1990 and aired for seven seasons on the ITV network in the United Kingdom.
