= Classified United Stated government networks =

Networks for sensitive information

A variety of networks operating in special security domains handle classified information in the United States or sensitive but unclassified information, while other specialized networks are reserved specifically for unclassified use by the same agencies. Some sites accessed from these networks have been referred to as "classified websites" in official communications, such as the American embassy "Amman's Classified Web Site at http://www.state.sgov.gov/pinea/amman/" and "Mexico City's Classified Web Site at http://www.state.sgov.gov/p/wha/mexicocity" Some of these trace back to the Defense Data Network which split from the Internet in 1983.

== Networks ==
=== ClassNet ===
ClassNet domain names for the State Department take the form ".state.sgov.gov". Web pages for ClassNet may be developed on a "classified workstation". "Any workstation used for development purposes may not serve as the operational repository of images, files, or other information associated with a Web site." ClassNet is used for telecommunications, and its use is promoted by the Business Center Division. Two versions of the State Messaging and Archival Retrieval Toolset (SMART) database were created, one with a maximum rating of Sensitive but Unclassified (SBU) for OpenNet+, and one with a top rating of Secret for ClassNet.

=== DNI-U (OSIS) ===
OSIS was the name of an "unclassified network serving the intelligence community with open-source intelligence". Originally used to refer both to the network and to the content it provided, it has since been decoupled, with the content named "Intelink-U", while the network continues as DNI-U. The network is maintained by the DNI-CIO Intelligence Community Enterprise Services office (ICES).

=== FBINet ===
FBINet is used internally by the Federal Bureau of Investigation for handling information that is classified up to the Secret level. It may be used for investigative case file and intelligence pertaining to national security.

=== GWAN / NMIS network ===
The NRO Management Information System (NMIS) is a computer network used to distribute NRO data classified as Top Secret. It is also known as the Government Wide Area Network (GWAN).

=== JWICS ===
The Joint Worldwide Intelligence Communications System (JWICS) is a secure TCP/IP network providing services such as hypertext and e-mail rated up to Top Secret and SCI. JWICS replaced the Defense Data Network DSNET2 (Top Secret) and DSNET3 (SCI) networks.

=== NIPRNet ===
NIPRNet is a low-security network reserved for unclassified information, such as regular Internet websites and firewalled but unclassified military websites.

=== NSANet ===
NSANet handles information rated Top Secret or Sensitive Compartmented Information.

=== OpenNet ===
According to the U.S. Department of State Foreign Affairs Manual, "OpenNet is a physical and logical Internet Protocol (IP)-based global network that links the Department of State's Local Area Networks (LANs) domestically and abroad. The physical aspect of the network uses DTS circuits for posts abroad, FTS-2001-provided circuits, leased lines, and dial-up public switch networks. This includes interconnected hubs, routers, bridges, switches, and cables. The logical aspect of the network uses Integrated Enterprise Management System (NMS) and TCP/IP software, and other operational network applications. OpenNet is a Sensitive But Unclassified (SBU) network, which supports e-mail and data applications."

=== OpenNet+ ===
OpenNet+ is described for State Department use as using standard .state.gov domain names, which must be requested through a State Department intranet site at http://intranet.state.gov/ds3081 . Web site development cannot be done on machines directly connected to this network. The "www" prefix is not to be used on OpenNet+, as it is reserved for use on the Internet.

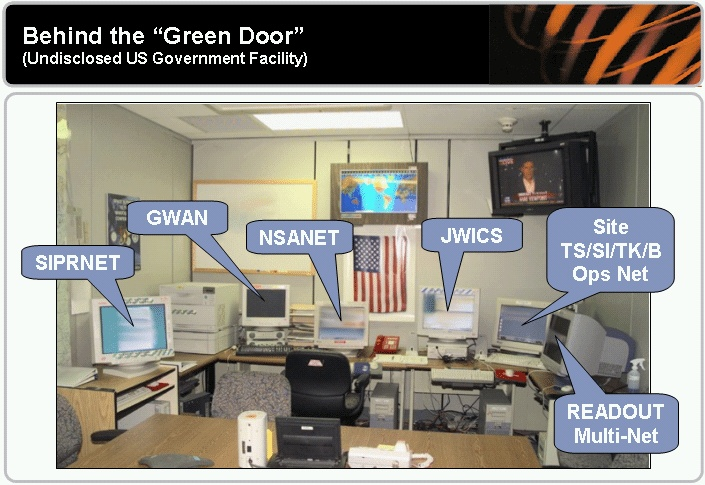
Behind the Green Door secure communications center with SIPRNET, GWAN, NSANET, and JWICS access

=== SIPRNet (DSNET1) ===
SIPRNet is a medium-security network for handling information that is classified as Secret or below. It may be used to access classified websites run by the Defense Intelligence Agency. SIPRNet replaced the Defense Data Network DSNET1 component.

== Acronyms ==
- SI = Special / Secret Intelligence
- TK is a codeword classification, standing for Talent Keyhole, meaning IMINT.
- TS/SI/TK is often used as a blanket "entry level clearance" for conferences, etc., as it is one of the most carefully controlled and restricted.
- B = BYEMAN (National Reconnaissance Office)
