= List of Smart Guy episodes =

The following is a list of episodes for The WB sitcom Smart Guy. In total, there were 51 episodes of the show shot over the course of its 3-season run, from April 2, 1997, to May 16, 1999.

== Series overview ==
Season	Episodes	Originally released	
Season	Episodes	First released	Last released
1	7	April 2, 1997	May 7, 1997
2	22	September 10, 1997	May 13, 1998
3	22	September 20, 1998	May 16, 1999

== Episodes ==
=== Season 1 (1997) ===
No. overall	No. in season	Title	Directed by	Written by	Original release date	Prod. code	Viewers (millions)
1	1	"Pilot"	John Tracy	Danny Kallis	May 14, 1997	W601	4.73
T.J. Henderson goes from being a fourth grade elementary student to a high-school sophomore at ten years old, much to the dismay of his brother, Marcus, who is in the same grade. T.J. ends up getting sent to the guidance counselor's office, twice in the same week: first for laughing at the word "breasts" in class, and then for defending Marcus when he gets into a fight with his best friend Mo over a girl they both like. Things get worse for Marcus when T.J. becomes the school's penguin mascot, and he eventually tells T.J. in anger that he wishes that T.J. would disappear from his life. Later, T.J. hides out under the bleachers during his first basketball game as the mascot after hearing Marcus' outburst. Marcus and their father Floyd manage to get T.J. on the court after Floyd lets T.J. know that he is not the only one who is the "odd man out" in life, and Marcus apologizes for the things he said to T.J. T.J. helps orchestrate a play that leads Piedmont High to win the basketball game. Guest starring: Oliver Muirhead as Mr. Taylor, Venus DeMilo Thomas as Mariah, Michael J. Cutt as Coach; Co-starring: Joseph Ashton as Eldin, Phil Buckman as Barry, Jill Jaress as Receptionist, Jennifer Lyons as Celia, Kimberly S. Newberry as Mrs. Neiter Notes: This is the only episode in which Anne-Marie Johnson plays Mrs. Williams, the school guidance counselor. The character was written out after the pilot episode.
2	2	"The Code"	Jimmy Hampton	Ralph Greene	April 2, 1997	W603	5.15
T.J. finds himself being ostracized after he tattles on Mo for smoking in the bathroom, going against "The Code", a rule in which friends are not supposed to rat another friend out if they do something wrong. T.J. ends up getting Mo suspended from the basketball team for two weeks, and he cannot play in a game against rivals Truman High. After the basketball team's mural gets defaced by the Truman High basketball players (making them look like women), T.J. comes up with a plan in which he, Marcus, Mo and their friend Lester sneak into the school so T.J. can change the grades of the players to make sure they don't qualify to play in the game. After successfully carrying out the plan -- despite Mo not getting enough rope to lower T.J. to the floor of the Truman High computer room, Principal Dowling finds out that a note from Mo's stationery -- signed with his name on it -- was left in the Truman High computer room, and rather than risk getting kicked off the basketball team, they choose to rat out T.J. as being the third member in the plan. In the end, T.J. learns that it is better to do the right thing when he sees someone doing something wrong. Guest starring: Marsha Warfield as Principal Dowling, Cirroc Lofton as Lester, Omar Gooding as Mo Co-starring: Alla Kaled as Ricky
3	3	"Brother, Brother"	Jimmy Hampton	Jake Weinberger & Michael Weinberger	April 9, 1997	W602	4.81
Marcus unwittingly asks twin transfer students named Rochelle and Roxanne out on a date, not knowing until asking Roxanne (thinking she's Rochelle) what they are going to do on their date that they are twins. With the help of T.J., he creates a suave, worldly and sensitive twin of his own, named Marquise, and goes out on dates with Rochelle and Roxanne at the same coffee shop on the same night. But the plan eventually hits a snag when both twins fall for Marquise, and he reveals his real identity, leaving Marcus with neither twin. Meanwhile, Principal Dowling enlists T.J. to look for a new computer system for Piedmont High, and he ends up getting wooed by two companies, who offer him cool presents in order to sway his opinion. However, T.J. gets carried away letting the companies shower him with cool gifts, and forgets to do the task at hand. After Principal Dowling comes to the Henderson household to talk to T.J. about his final decision on the computer system, he informs her that neither of the two computer companies that lavished him with gifts had the best computer; he also reveals that the company that had the best computer system out of the ones he scouted had only gave him a keychain as a gift -- with a key on it that belongs to a Jaguar. Guest starring: Tia Mowry as Rochelle, Tamera Mowry as Roxanne, Marsha Warfield as Principal Dowling; Co-starring: Kenya Moore as Vivian Kennedy, Jack Tate as Hank, Granville Ames as Gary; Title Reference: Fellow ABC/WB sitcom Sister, Sister Note: Jason Weaver guest starred in two episodes of Sister, Sister, which starred guest stars Tia and Tamera Mowry, the season three episode "Summer Bummer" and the season four episode "Boy from the Hood". Sister, Sister was dropped from ABC in 1995 and picked up by The WB. Tia and Tamera Mowry are the older sisters of Tahj Mowry.
4	4	"Don't Do That Thing You Do"	Jimmy Hampton	Gigi McCreery & Perry Rein	April 16, 1997	W604	4.10
When the keyboard player in Marcus' band Mackadocious breaks his finger and gets sidelined, T.J. steps in to save the day, but Marcus is not willing to let T.J. play during their big gig at the school's "Battle of the Bands" competition. T.J. shows his talent for tickling the ivories at the competition, interrupting Marcus' performance and making him jealous. Frustrated with T.J. getting the limelight instead of him, Marcus decides to fire T.J. as keyboard player. But when a budding music producer scouts Mackadocious to be one of his clients, Marcus changes his mind -- only for T.J. to refuse his invitation back into the band. After the two are caught fighting by Floyd and he finds out about Marcus firing his little brother, Marcus admits that he was jealous that T.J. was good at everything, even music and T.J. admits he wishes he could sing as good as Marcus does. T.J. also admits that he offered to show the record producer some tax loopholes in exchange for getting him to get Mackadocious phony gigs where they would play for nobody as revenge for getting kicked out of the band. Meanwhile, Yvette is utterly shocked and disgusted when her friend Lydia admits to having a crush on Floyd. But when Yvette tries to get Floyd to talk reason to Lydia about her crush on him, they find out that Lydia has a new crush on someone her own age. Guest starring: Gabrielle Union as Lydia, Christopher "Kid" Reid as Ernie Tracy; Co-starring: Sean Parhm as Keyboard Player, Justin Urich as Goose, Terrence Paul Winter as Ace, Ken Lawson as Tiko, Jeanine Michelle as Pianist, Christina Milian as Kiki, Amarillis as Natasha; Title Reference: The 1996 music-comedy film That Thing You Do! Featured Song: "I Don't Know Why" (performed by Jason Weaver [Marcus Henderson], from his 1996 EP "Stay with Me") Note: Possibly due to licensing issues related to the use of "I Don't Know Why" in two scenes (in its lyrical and instrumental versions), this is the only episode of the series that is not available to stream on Disney+.
5	5	"Lab Rats"	Jimmy Hampton	Bob Underwood	April 23, 1997	W605	4.12
When T.J. and Mo are paired for a science project to observe animal behavior, T.J. decides to observe and alter the romantic lives of Marcus and Yvette. He decides to teach Yvette to train her boyfriend Tyler -- by using a dog training manual, and get Marcus' crush Alina to notice him by getting him to wear a red sweater. But the plan goes awry when Tyler starts to literally begin acting like a dog and Marcus has to face Alina's big ex-boyfriend Warren, who threatens to beat him up. T.J. tries to remedy Marcus' problem by getting Mo to act like a tough guy to scare him out of fighting Marcus, claiming that he is dating Alina. That plan goes awry as well, when Warren tells Marcus that Alina is Mo's woman, and he gets angry, not realizing the plan at hand and almost starts a fight between him, Mo, T.J. and Warren in the school hallway when Warren finds out that Mo isn't so much of the tough guy he talked himself up to be. Floyd tells T.J. back home after watching his assignment that T.J. can't use people as test subjects, even for school, because they have feelings. He still concocts a sob story to trick his father out of punishing him - which backfires when Floyd overhears T.J. telling it into the camera. T.J. has to clean the dishes that is originally Marcus's turn to clean. Guest starring: Wesley Jonathan as Tyler, Natashia Williams as Alina, Sam Monroe as Warren Co-starring: Sarah Lilly as Mrs. Poole, Hank Harris as Locker Kid, Tamera Hinton as Bossy Girl
6	6	"A Little Knowledge"	Howard Murray	Andrew Nicholls and Darrell Vickers	April 30, 1997	W606	3.72
T.J. realizes that the family is having some money troubles after Floyd has to buy bulk foods, and denies Marcus a motorcycle and Yvette a winter coat because the family doesn't have enough money, so he decides to audition for a "Junior Edition" of the game show "Knowledge College". Marcus announces to everyone in school that T.J. is going on the show, and even buys the motorcycle he wants from a student in advance, knowing that T.J. will win the money needed. But he gets more than he bargained for when T.J. stays up all night studying, hopped up on chocolate and coffee, and crashes and burns during the show. Floyd tells T.J. that he shouldn't worry about the family's finances, and that they are doing fine. When Floyd decides to take a tired T.J. off the show, Marcus has to play the rest of the game in T.J.'s place, which doesn't turn out well. He then is forced to take a job as a janitor at the chicken restaurant where Yvette is working to pay back the money for the motorcycle. Guest starring: John O'Hurley as Hugh Sterling, Ashley Michelle Tisdale as Amy, Kristopher Kachurak as Travis; Co-starring: Noreen Reardon as Amy's Mom, Brian Kaiser as Travis' Dad, Natasha Pearce as Kimmy, Martin Maurice Davis as Craig; Absent: Omar Gooding as Morris Tibbs Notes: Omar Gooding did not appear in this episode. This is the only episode to be written by Andrew Nicholls & Darrell Vickers
7	7	"Baby It's You and You and You"	Howard Murray	Frank Dungan & Michael Baser	May 7, 1997	W607	4.79
As the school prom looms, Floyd, Marcus and Yvette wish to ensure that T.J. has a date, even though T.J. claims that he does not want to go -- and they set him up with a girl his own age. However, this causes them to unknowingly set T.J. up with three different girls to take without conferencing one another. T.J., afraid he'll disappoint his family if he tells either one of them that he can't accept their offers for the dates they set him up with, decides to go with Marcus' plan (orchestrated by Mo) to take all three dates without them meeting each other. But the plan backfires as T.J.'s three prom dates all meet each other in the kitchen, leaving T.J. to learn a lesson that he shouldn't have to say "yes" to something just to please his family. In the end, T.J. decides to take all three dates to the dance -- with Mo coordinating the time T.J. has to dance with them. Guest starring: Kyla Pratt as Lillie Simms, Richard Gant as Rev. Simms, Bianca Lawson as Shirley, Lauren Robinson as Andrea Co-starring: Venus DeMilo Thomas as Mariah, Naya Rivera as Tanya, Christine Miller as Tina Note: This is the only episode of the series not to feature a tag scene during the closing credits; the song played during the final scene at the dance is played over a black screen with the credits overlaid instead.

=== Season 2 (1997–98) ===
- Omar Gooding, who was a recurring guest star in the first season, becomes a series regular starting with the season premiere episode "Primary Brothers".

No. overall	No. in season	Title	Directed by	Written by	Original release date	Prod. code	Viewers (millions)
8	1	"Primary Brothers"	Ted Wass	Ralph Greene	September 10, 1997	W609	4.44
T.J. begins to set up a campaign to run for school president, believing that it would take nothing to win. But when T.J.'s campaign flounders, he decides to have Marcus run in his place, thinking that he'd be a shoo-in to win, and then control him behind the scenes. But his plan goes haywire when Marcus does not go along with one of T.J.'s campaign promises and Marcus decides to run by himself, forcing T.J. to have Mo run against Marcus, which ends up putting a strain on their friendship -- leading to a fight onstage at a debate that T.J. unwittingly ends up in. Later after a talk with Floyd, T.J. confesses to Marcus and Mo about what he did to them -- with Marcus and Mo putting their friendship back together and T.J. hiding from them when they agree upon T.J.'s suggestion that he deserves to be pounded on. Guest starring: Monica McSwain as Shannon, Esteban Louis Powell as Sheldon; Co-starring: Marvin Jones as Cyrus, Nicole Brown as Michelle, Shaun Cozzens as Brock Slaney; Title Reference: Primary Colors Note: The Henderson house set is changed with this episode; a living room is added and the kitchen set was also changed and no longer has a back stairs.
9	2	"Working Guy"	Ted Wass	Danny Kallis & Bob Young	September 17, 1997	W610	4.61
Marcus, Mo and T.J. get jobs as part of a school assignment. T.J. is forced to work at "Chow Wagon", delivering food, and ends up impressing the boardroom at an electronics company, specializing in the manufacturing of DVDs. As T.J. earns a job at the company, he soon becomes a little too obsessed with it -- and ends up being given a bigger workload thanks to his co-worker Mr. Ferret as payback for getting him in trouble with the boss for explaining that T.J.'s ideas be passed to the boss by Ferret, and Floyd feels it's time to lay down the law when he finds that T.J. is barely spending any time with the family, and he ends up missing his father's basketball game. Meanwhile, Mo gets a job at a law firm for the project and loses his job after failing to deliver a document to be sent to the U.S. Government, and ends up in T.J.'s former "Chow Wagon" job. Guest starring: Jim Jansen as Paxton Murdoch, Scott N. Stevens as Mr. Ferret, Robin Stapler as Jeanine Neufelt, Roxanne Beckford as Perkins; Co-starring: Michele T. Carter as Sasha, James K. Ward as Principal Militich Title Reference: The 1988 drama film Working Girl
10	3	"Below the Rim"	Ted Wass	Adam Lapidus	September 24, 1997	W608	4.40
When the basketball coach quits in the middle of a game after Coach Gerber finds out that his wife has decided to leave him, the team must come up with another coach or forfeit -- so T.J. is elected and though the team does not win that game, they make an incredible comeback -- and eventually, the team ends up going from losers to winners. However, T.J. abuses his power in the new position, pushing the team players a little too hard, forcing Floyd to pull T.J. during halftime of a crucial game, and teach T.J. a lesson on how to be a leader. Meanwhile, Yvette has second thoughts about quitting the cheerleading squad. Guest starring: Dann Florek as Coach Gerber, Liz Torres as Principal Maldonado; Co-starring: Fred Applegate as Mr. LeBeau, June Christopher as Mrs. Lang, Joe Colligan as Referee, Sebastian Tillinger as Terry, Jamal Hamilton as Opposing Player, Joshua Levey as Student #1, Maya Elise Goodwin as Valerie Title Reference: The 1994 sports film Above the Rim
11	4	"Dateline"	Ted Wass	Howard Nemetz	October 1, 1997	W611	6.19
Feeling that it's time for his dad Floyd to start dating again, T.J. uses a computer dating service to hook Floyd up with a beautiful woman. They set him up with a woman named Jamie, who ends up hitting it off with Floyd -- and Yvette and Marcus (who didn't even want Floyd to be set up fearing that he won't be able to use the car on dates) like her. T.J., however, regrets his decision when he feels uncomfortable about Floyd and his new girlfriend's relationship, when Jamie seems to monopolize his dad's time from T.J. Guest starring: Jackie Mari Roberts as Jamie; Co-starring: Apryl Angelique DuPree as Alanis, Cory Hardrict as Kid, Stacy Marie Fouché as Woman Note: Cory Hardrict would later marry Tahj Mowry's sister Tia Mowry in 2008.
12	5	"Dumbstruck"	Ted Wass	Douglas Tuber & Tim Maile	October 8, 1997	W612	4.78
T.J.'s IQ takes a dive after he's accidentally hit on the head by a couple of wood planks while helping Marcus and Mo stack some 2x4s, allowing him to act more his age. Marcus decides to step up and become the smarter brother for the first time, which he finds to be hard. However when T.J.'s intelligence reappears while in class one day, he decides to continue acting dumb, realizing the benefits as he is no longer getting picked on by classmates and fits in with Marcus and Mo. But T.J. eventually reveals his intelligence is back, when he, Marcus and Mo are in danger of failing after Marcus begins to panic after he forgets the facts on his report, during the trio's oral presentation on World War II. Guest starring: Yeardley Smith as Mrs. Rawlings, Esteban Louis Powell as Clark; Co-starring: Johari Johnson as Dr. Ross, Andrew Hill Newman as Mirisch Note: This is the first appearance of J.D. Walsh as Mackey. However in this episode Mackey is a bully, but in all other episodes he appears in, he is shown as a sensitive nice guy who is sometimes ridiculed by his friends. This is Estaban Louis Powell's second appearance on the show. He previously appeared as Sheldon, a character similar to the one he plays in this episode in the episode "Primary Brothers", four episodes earlier.
13	6	"Trial and Error"	Ted Wass	Tammy Gordon	October 15, 1997	W613	5.87
The school's chemistry lab catches on fire, and when Mo's burned chemistry book is found in the rubble, Mo becomes the prime suspect and he gets suspended, prompting T.J. to defend him. After it seems Mo may be done for during a mock trial that T.J. convinces Principal Whitfield to hold, T.J. and Mo sneak in to the school so T.J. can do forensic work on the chemistry book. T.J. finds out that it is actually Mo's hated teacher Mr. Bringleman who set the fire after T.J. gets him to confess that he accidentally caused it by leaving a lit cigarette in the classroom. Meanwhile, Marcus tries to get noticed in the school play, even though his role has no lines. Guest starring: Taylor Negron as Mr. Bringleman, Jenny O'Hara as Principal Whitfield Co-starring: Victor Togunde as Cliff Moffatt, Nancy Arnold as Ms. Kennedy, James K. Ward as Mr. Militich, J.D. Walsh as Mackey
14	7	"Big Picture"	Terri McCoy	Jacqueline McKinley & Antonia March	October 29, 1997	W614	5.39
T.J., Marcus and Mo decide to shoot a music video for their video production class, with T.J. serving as the director. But when everyone involved in the project complains about T.J.'s inability to compromise with the other students, he decides to value the others' input, leaving T.J.'s creative project a mess when none of his ideas make it on and he ends up using everyone's ideas in order not to upset everyone else. T.J. talks with Floyd about the situation, and gives him advice that T.J. should not be a dictator or a doormat and that T.J. and everyone else should work together. Instead of the music video, T.J. sends in a discussion between him, Marcus, Mo and the other project partners -- which gets them a good grade. Meanwhile, Yvette falls for a hunky swimmer named Xavier, who's a little shallow -- and she stresses over if she is only into him for his body. Guest starring: Francesca P. Roberts as Mrs. Clendening, Jason Olive as Xavier, Amy Leland as Tammie; Co-starring: Taraji P. Henson as Monique, J.D. Walsh as Mackey, Sebastian Tillinger as Terry, Charity Hill as Mia, Love Barnett as Farrah Song featured: "Don't Hate Me for Being a Dog"
15	8	"Book Smart"	Sheldon Epps	Adam Lapidus	November 5, 1997	W616	5.10
T.J.'s teacher Mr. Delk begins to reprimand him due to the fact that their constant rounds of back-and-forth about various school subjects are disrupting the class from learning anything. One day in class when T.J. proves to Mr. Delk that most of the signers of the Declaration of Independence signed it on August 2, 1776 instead of July 4th – and the students cheer T.J. for proving Mr. Delk wrong – Mr. Delk teaches T.J. a lesson and has him handle the class, which goes haywire. After T.J. hides out in the teacher's lounge, he and Mr. Delk come to an agreement that they can debate about facts one-on-one, just not in class. In the meantime, Marcus and Mo try to figure out how to get into a female self-defense class in order to meet girls but after they get in, they regret it after they become the practice dummies and end up in serious pain. Guest starring: Jack Blessing as Mr. Delk Co-starring: J.D. Walsh as Mackey, Spice Williams as Mrs. Bellamy, Nakia R. Burrise as Sarina, Toby Smith as Dana
16	9	"The Dating Game"	Terri McCoy	Douglas Tuber & Tim Maile	November 12, 1997	W615	5.86
To stop Deion from following her and asking her for dates even though she is not interested, Yvette agrees to T.J.'s plan to dissuade him and pretends to be Mo's girlfriend. The plan takes a turn when Mo becomes infatuated with Yvette and sets out to make her his girlfriend with T.J.'s help. At the dance, T.J. acts as a DJ while Mo tries to romance Yvette – but when another guy is interested in her, Mo's plan hits a major snag. Meanwhile, Floyd gives Marcus an after-school job on his roofing squad as a valuable life lesson when Marcus gets mediocre grades on his report card. Guest starring: Arvie Lowe, Jr. as Deion White Co-starring: Coby Bell as Garret, W. Earl Brown as Sonny, Sebastian Tillinger as Terry, Charity Hill as Mia
17	10	"Love Letters"	Ted Wass	Jacqueline McKinley & Antonia March	November 19, 1997	W617	5.89
T.J. ghostwrites love letters for Marcus to Nina, the new girl in their literature class, and winds up having to ghostwrite letters for Nina back to Marcus, who has fallen for him, or rather what she thinks are his poetic words. But things become complicated when T.J. develops a crush on Nina, and he conspires to break the two up so he can have her. After T.J. reveals that he is the poet in question, he decides to let Nina and Marcus give things a second try. Meanwhile, Yvette teaches Mo how to cook so he can pass his cooking class, but is ends up causing problems when the family thinks that Mo's cooking is better than Yvette's, leading to a food fight in the kitchen. Guest starring: Reagan Gomez-Preston as Nina Duperly; Co-starring: Dwayne Winstead as Spike Note: At the time this episode originally aired, guest star Reagan Gomez-Preston played Zaria Peterson, the eldest daughter of Robert Peterson (Robert Townsend), on a fellow WB sitcom, The Parent 'Hood.
18	11	"T.J. Versus the Machine" "T.J. vs. the Machine"	Ted Wass	Ralph Greene	December 10, 1997	W618	5.74
T.J. challenges a supercomputer named Socrates, to a game of chess in order to win computers for the school. Marcus and Mo decide to bet on T.J. knowing he would win the match. But when T.J. shockingly loses to Socrates, a rattled T.J. decides not to challenge the computer to a rematch, and Marcus and Mo try to convince him to play again. When T.J. discovers that Marcus and Mo are betting against him on their next match, he backs out. When Marcus apologizes and helps him devise a play to confuse Socrates, he ends up winning. Meanwhile, Yvette resents Floyd when he does not pay any attention to her when she talks about her plans for her future. Guest starring: Arvie Lowe Jr. as Deion White, James K. Ward as Mr. Militich Co-starring: J.D. Walsh as Mackey, Blake Soper as Scotty, David Starzyk as Mr. Hamilton, Lance Nichols as Larry
19	12	"Men Working Badly"	Ted Wass	Howard Nemetz	January 7, 1998	W619	5.93
When Yvette becomes disgruntled over having to share a bathroom with Marcus and T.J., Floyd enlists T.J. and Marcus to help build Yvette her own private bathroom, but she is less than thrilled with the end result (saying it was "nice", which was actually woman-speak meaning that she hated it). The guys try to redo the bathroom after Mo gives them a floor plan Yvette drew up on what her dream bathroom would look like, and the Henderson men end up making a mess after Marcus fails to reinforce the floorboards after replacing the shower with a tub and it crashes into the kitchen, with T.J. inside, though uninjured. Yvette tells Floyd that she wants decisions involving her to be made with her, instead of for her. Meanwhile, when T.J. and Mo are late for their Life Science class – on account of Mo making a detour on the way to school when he ends up following Salt 'N' Pepa's tour bus for 38 blocks – they are paired together for a project in which they have to raise a family and balance a family budget; though the two's grade is in jeopardy when they can't agree on how to parent their "child" (a bag of flour they named Jada) or on making responsible financial decisions. Co-starring: James K. Ward as Mr. Militich Title Reference: Men Behaving Badly
20	13	"Rooferman, Take One"	Sheldon Epps	Douglas Tuber & Tim Maile	January 21, 1998	W620	4.93
Although Floyd initially refuses, T.J. thinks his dad's business would benefit from a TV commercial. He, Marcus and Mo go to local television station WDCS-TV, where station manager Kenny Bell sells them on having a commercial for Floyd's business produced. But when the station does not air the commercial between 8 p.m. and 10 p.m. as the manager made it sound and it airs it at 3 a.m. (after they fail to read the fine print in the commercial contract that it would air at any time between 8 p.m. and 10 a.m.), T.J. – under the disguise of being Mo's ventriloquist dummy for a station telethon, sneaks in to the station's control room and re-programs the commercial to air that Sunday night, not realizing that he mistakenly programmed it to air during the Super Bowl. Fearing that he might be sent to jail after they see on the local news that they are looking for the culprit in the incident, T.J. eventually confesses to Floyd that he moved the commercial. Guest starring: Steve Bean as Kenny Bell, Hattie Winston as Felicia Vanowen; Co-starring: Jeff Blumenkrantz as Stage Manager, Matt McKenzie as Newscaster, Keaton Savage as Kid Note: Two programs mentioned in this episode as airing on the fictional WDCS-TV, the station T.J., Marcus and Mo sell a commercial to for Floyd's roofing business, were actually aired on The WB's then-competitor NBC around the time of this episode: ER and Super Bowl XXXII.
21	14	"Stop the Presses"	Sheldon Epps	Adam Lapidus	January 28, 1998	W621	5.34
T.J. decides he wants to be a reporter, but since answering to Yvette as the editor of the school newspaper and being forced to do only puff pieces is more than he can take, he starts his own rival publication called The Weekly Veritas; though the stories in the paper do not catch the Piedmont High students' interest. When Marcus and Mo convince T.J. to turn his fledgling paper into a sleazy tabloid, Floyd is unamused and Yvette tries tactics to take down T.J.'s paper. But the competition goes too far when after Yvette scoops a story from Mo that was meant to be featured in The Veritas, T.J. decides to post a photo of Yvette in a swimsuit making Yvette, the Veritas' "girl of the week"; this prompts Floyd to order T.J. to shut down his paper, and he tries to get T.J. to see that his retaliatory tactic against Yvette had hurt his sister in the process. When the two make amends, T.J. agrees to use an embarrassing picture of himself (nicknamed "The Tush Picture") in the final edition of The Veritas. Guest starring: La'Myia Good as Tina Co-starring: J.D. Walsh as Mackey, Micah Morton as Wendy, Kimberly Maynard as Brenda, Owen Bush as Mr. Crabtree
22	15	"Bad Boy"	Lex Passaris	Tammy Gordon	February 4, 1998	W622	5.5
T.J. meets and falls for a girl named Brandi at the arcade but he realizes that he is falling short in the style department, so Marcus and Mo decide to give him a new "gangsta" look that is more "'bout it, 'bout it" — one his dad does not approve of. When T.J. and Floyd disagree on his new look and Floyd tells T.J. to not leave the house until he gets out of his new style, T.J. decides to sneak out to the arcade to meet Brandi and unwittingly ends up in a fight. T.J. decides to have Mo sleeping in his bed to look like T.J. is in bed and to have tape recording answers to questions that he knows that Floyd would ask him knowing he would have a talk with him about the disagreement over his new look with Marcus playing the answers on the tape player via remote control, but his plan to make Floyd think he's still home backfires and Floyd figures out that T.J. snuck out of the house. He finds T.J. in the middle of a fight between Brandi's friends at the arcade – a fight which T.J. tried to stop – and gets carried out of there by Floyd as Floyd grounds T.J. for two weeks. Floyd makes T.J. see that his new style gave him a new attitude that isn't great, and that if Brandi is a good friend that she will hang out with T.J. no matter what he wears. Brandi agrees to hang out with T.J. again, though not at the arcade as they were banned for fighting. Guest starring: Kyla Pratt as Brandi Dixon, Bryton McClure as Cory; Co-starring: Shekinah Williams as Robyn, Bryan A. Robinson as Aaron; Note: This is Kyla Pratt's first appearance as Brandi Dixon, but her second appearance on the show. Pratt previously appeared in the season 1 finale "Baby, It's You and You and You". Title Reference: The 1995 action film Bad Boys
23	16	"Most Hated Man on Campus"	John Ferraro	Frank Dungan & Michael Baser	February 11, 1998	W623	5.34
When Anthony "The Hammer" Williams, the star player of the Piedmont High basketball team is in danger of flunking history and being off the team, it's up to T.J. to tutor him before the big game. But T.J. ends up being blamed by everyone in the school and becomes an outcast — becoming shunned by Piedmont High students including Marcus and Mo, and threatened with a demotion from the team's equipment manager back down to school mascot by Coach Gerber — after Anthony develops a new enlightened non-confrontational demeanor, and it is up to T.J. to convince Anthony to be his old aggressive self again. After a talk with Floyd, T.J. realizes that even though he is being pressured to turn Anthony back into "The Hammer" in order for the team to win, that he can't do it and lets Anthony make the decision to leave Piedmont High and study abroad. Everyone is still mad at T.J. as Piedmont ends up on the way to losing a crucial game against a rival team, leading T.J. to hide out under the bleachers. Guest starring: Coby Bell as Anthony "The Hammer" Williams, Dann Florek as Coach Gerber; Co-starring: J.D. Walsh as Mackey, James K. Ward as Mr. Militich Note: This is Coby Bell's second appearance on the show. Bell previously appeared eight episodes earlier in the episode "The Dating Game" as Garrett. Tahj Mowry's sister Tia Mowry and Coby Bell would later star in The CW/BET series, The Game. Mowry guest stars on three episodes of The Game as Cameron Barnett, Melanie's brother on the episodes "There's No Place Like Home", I Want it all and I Want It Now" and the season finale of "The Wedding Episode".
24	17	"Goodbye, Mr. Chimps"	Ted Wass	Ralph Greene	February 18, 1998	W625	4.45
T.J. qualifies as an intern at the Primate Intelligence Research Project, and has to teach a chimpanzee named Homer. But when Homer is faced with having to go to a zoo if he can't learn anything, T.J. brings him home with him. T.J. becomes frustrated with trying to teach Homer, but he begins to regret getting mad at him when he escapes from his cage, while T.J. is taking a nap. Ultimately despite T.J.'s best efforts, Homer ends up having to live at the zoo, but T.J. knows that he did his best. Yvette has problems with Homer as well, when he runs away each time she tries to hug him. Meanwhile, Marcus and Mo try to get rich selling "nutritional, energy supplement" candy bars. But they discover that Deion is involved them in a pyramid scheme, when they discover that he has convinced every other student in school to sell the bars as well. The duo however is unable to sell the bars to people once Homer gets to the package and eats every one of the bars up — though Marcus and Mo decide to sell the leftover bars to the zoo as food for monkeys. Guest starring: Arvie Lowe Jr. as Deion White, Mimi Leiber as Dr. Bonham, J.D. Cullum as Paul; Co-starring: J.D. Walsh as Mackey, Stephanie Charles as Leslie, Roderick Garr as Delivery Man Title Reference: Goodbye, Mr. Chips
25	18	"Dawgburger Rebellion"	Danny Kallis	Story by : Jacqueline McKinley & Antonia March; Teleplay by : Tammy Gordon	February 25, 1998	W627	4.05
After hearing of tales of Floyd's Uncle Mert, a 1960s activist who staged a sit-in at a lunch counter in North Carolina after he was refused to sit in the lunchroom because he was African-American, T.J. becomes inspired. When the students' constant lateness to class to get lunch off-campus causes Vice Principal Militich to impose a ban on students going off-campus to eat lunch, T.J. protests the change and recruits the other students in a sit-in in Militich's office. But not all the students take the sit-in very seriously, and when they are faced with expulsion, only Floyd can talk some sense into T.J. In the end, T.J.'s efforts work out for the best as Vice Principal Militich lifts the off-campus lunch ban. Guest starring: Arvie Lowe Jr. as Deion White Co-starring: J.D. Walsh as Mackey, James K. Ward as Mr. Militich
26	19	"Strangers on the Net"	Lex Passaris	Howard Nemetz	March 4, 1998	W624	6.70
T.J. and his friend Karen buy bootleg computer games from an online friend named "Marky412" they met at an online chatroom for kids. After meeting him, T.J. and Karen are surprised to discover that he is an adult. They think they can trust him, but they soon run into trouble when they discover Mark may be a child molester. Luckily, T.J. gets himself and Karen out before they get into a situation they might live to regret. Meanwhile, Marcus and Mo buy a used car that does not seem to run, and have Yvette buy a stake in the car. Guest starring: Cerita Monet Bickelmann as Karen, Jim Fyfe as Mark Breslin Co-starring: Sandy Edgerton as Det. Shevlen
27	20	"Gotta Dance"	Jimmy Hampton	Douglas Tuber & Tim Maile	April 29, 1998	W626	4.69
After attending a dance class with Yvette and seeing her teacher – whom Yvette has a crush on – show off some incredible moves, T.J. makes a decision that his life's ambition is to become a tap dancer, but he finds out it's no cakewalk and decides that he wants to quit. Floyd (after a little nudging from Yvette) and the school's dance teacher Mr. Tierney convince T.J. not to quit dancing, and he and Mr. Tierney put on an awesome show at the school's dance recital. Meanwhile, Mo finds out through an aptitude test that he should be a motivational speaker, but later is disappointed when he finds out that his aptitude test was mixed up with another student's and his dream job is to be a vice principal. Guest starring: Dulé Hill as Calvin Tierney; Co-starring: James K. Ward as Mr. Militch, J.D. Walsh as Mackey, Denise May Taylor as Dana Note: In addition to guest starring in this episode, Dulé Hill also helped choreograph the dance sequences in the episode, along with Lorriane Fields.
28	21	"Something Wicked This Way Comes"	Jimmy Hampton	Adam Lapidus	May 6, 1998	W628	3.73
When Mo's parents leave for a second honeymoon, Marcus and T.J. convince Floyd to let Mo stay with the Henderson family, but it drives a wedge between T.J. and Marcus – so much so, that Marcus moves out of their bedroom and into the attic. Meanwhile, Floyd objects to Yvette dating a college guy. When the fighting becomes too much for Mo to take, he decides to leave. T.J. and Marcus, and Yvette and Floyd, however, resolve their disagreements and Mo decides to stay. Guest starring: Tom "T.J." Jones as Clay Brooks
29	22	"My Two Dads"	John Ferraro	Howard Nemetz	May 13, 1998	W629	3.01
Floyd starts having doubts when T.J. bonds with a new astronomy teacher named Mr. Harrison, making him question his importance in T.J.'s life. Meanwhile, Marcus and Mo find out that Deion is exploiting their personal style by photographing them for a fashion magazine against their wishes. So they come up with a plan to make Deion look like a fool, by making themselves and other students look unfashionable. Guest starring: Arvie Lowe Jr. as Deion White; Co-starring: J.D. Walsh as Mackey, Shawn Michael Howard as Mitchell Harrison, Stephanie Charles as Stacie Title Reference: My Two Dads

=== Season 3 (1998–99) ===
- Season 3's opening song/credits changed from the first two seasons.

No. overall	No. in season	Title	Directed by	Written by	Original release date	Prod. code	Viewers (millions)
30	1	"She Got Game" "She Got the Game"	John Ferraro	Tammy Gordon	September 20, 1998	W633	3.69
T.J. is thrilled when he talks his friend Brandi into joining the basketball team -- until she replaces him as starting point guard, and he ends up being relegated to the bench. When Brandi finds out that T.J. dislikes the fact that she is now the star player on the team and he is not needed, she fakes an injury so T.J. can play. Meanwhile, Mo tries to attract an older woman who happens to be the mother of one of T.J.'s teammates. Guest starring: Kyla Pratt as Brandi, Charmin Lee as Bernadette; Co-starring: V.P. Oliver as Curtis, Bryan A. Robinson as Kamaal, Paul Franklin Dano as Nicholas; Title Reference: The 1998 sports film He Got Game Note: The opening credits are changed to a music video-style sequence featuring the entire cast, with a new theme song composed by Hami and performed by Hami and rap by Omar Gooding. The Henderson living room set is slightly modified with this episode, with the front door now located on stage left instead of stage center with a window now directly at stage center, and some of the furniture is repositioned. The season 2 set was still seen in "A Beating is Fundamental" and "Achy Breaky Heart".
31	2	"Achy Breaky Heart"	Danny Kallis	Tammy Gordon	September 27, 1998	W631	3.68
When the drummer in Marcus' band Mackadocious has to drop out because of his failing grades, the band has to search for a new drummer and finds one in a girl named Stacey. T.J. also becomes the band's manager and helps Marcus get his groove back after he gets dumped by Stacey and goes back to her ex-boyfriend, and has to deal with Mo's new girlfriend -- who doesn't talk for herself. Guest starring: Shar Jackson as Stacey, Ian Gomez as Art Bruno, Brook Kerr as Shakra, Aiysha Sinclair as Jasmine, Ashlee Turner as Kesha, Ross Leon as Lance; Title Reference: The 1992 country hit song Achy Breaky Heart by Billy Ray Cyrus Featured Song: "Love Always"
32	3	"Love Bug"	Lex Passaris	Ralph Greene	October 4, 1998	W635	4.49
Yvette and Mo enter a contest at a mall to win a Volkswagen Bug, and go up against two other men for the car, with the last one sitting in the VW Bug declared the winner of the car. But when they end up the last ones sitting in the car, Mo and Yvette try to use the same sneaky tactics they used to ace out the other players to get the other out so they can win. In the end, Mo tries to get sympathy from Yvette by claiming he needs to win the car in order to get away from his parents' fighting -- only for Yvette to realize he stole the sob story from an episode of 7th Heaven, Yvette forces Mo out the car, but loses anyway when she finds that one of the contestants who left the contest a couple of days earlier -- a former English teacher named Sidney Bloom -- snuck back in the car and hid in the trunk. Meanwhile, Marcus gets a date with a sophomore who has a reputation, but the date ends up ruined when T.J. has an allergic reaction to shellfish at a friend's party and has to come home. Guest starring: Len Lesser as Sidney Bloom, Crystal Celeste Grant as Erica; Co-starring: Jerry Kernion as Jon Dalrymple, Kente Scott as Tony, John M. Craig as "Ravin' Dave" Brooks Title Reference: The 1968 Disney film The Love Bug
33	4	"Henderson House Party"	John Ferraro	Howard Nemetz	October 11, 1998	W634	4.89
When Floyd leaves town on business and forbids Marcus to throw a party while he's away, T.J. throws a party to make himself popular -- problem is everyone thinks that Marcus is the one that threw the party. Marcus goes along with the plan when T.J. explains that he has plausible deniability, and if Floyd finds out he'll take the rap for it. But when the party gets out of hand -- leading to a destroyed window, a soapy floor due to a makeshift slip and slide and guests getting drunk, Marcus gets in trouble anyway and he takes the rap for T.J. Floyd has a talk with Marcus that T.J. confessed to the party being his idea, getting him punished as well, and that he should have given Marcus a chance to explain before getting angry at him. Marcus does admit to Floyd that he could have stopped the party, and he is just as responsible for the party as T.J. was and Marcus is grounded for three weeks for disobeying Floyd. Meanwhile, T.J. meets the little sister of one of the party guests, and ends up sharing a slow dance and his first kiss with her. Guest starring: Arvie Lowe Jr. as Deion White, J.D. Walsh as Mackey, Jazz Raycole as Vanessa, Tinsley Grimes as Nina Co-starring: Venus DeMilo Thomas as Renita, Mike Muzzy as Louis, Manu Intiraymi as Carl, Kente Scott as Tony
34	5	"That's My Momma"	Danny Kallis	Douglas Tuber & Tim Maile	October 18, 1998	W637	3.99
The Hendersons throw Mo a surprise 17th birthday party (which he already found out about thanks to a message left on his family's answering machine), and at the party Mo walks in on a conversation between his parents and accidentally learns that he is adopted. So T.J., Marcus and Yvette help him find his birth mother, which ends up involving Mo and Yvette creating a diversion by pretending to be a unwed couple with a baby on the way. Mo finds out that a woman who was a musician is not his birth mother, but finds out that his real mother is a psychic in Delaware. Mo's parents and Floyd let Mo known that even though he is adopted, that his parents love him anyway. Guest starring: Rolanda Watts as Lydia Huckabee, Esther Scott as Verla Mae Tibbs, Earl Billings as Delroy Tibbs Co-starring: Brian Reddy as Noonan, Candy Brown Houston as Sheila
35	6	"A Beating is Fundamental"	Mark Cendrowski	Ralph Greene	October 25, 1998	W630	3.34
T.J. gets accepted into Mensa, and when Floyd accompanies T.J. at his first meeting, Floyd ends up meeting an attractive divorcée named Hillary Jordan, but T.J. can not stand her uppity son Blake from the first time he meets him at the Mensa orientation. Things come to a boil when T.J. takes offense to Blake's insults about Floyd's blue collar job as a roofer believing he is not good enough for his mother, leading T.J. to punch Blake. Floyd and Hillary later have a talk about the scuffle between their sons, leading them to break up over a disagreement about each other's parenting of their kids. Meanwhile for a school project in which they have to run a business, Marcus and Mo start a hair-cutting business that cuts into the business of a burly hair salon owner named Mr. Jerome and despite a warning from Yvette, they don't take it seriously; they eventually end up getting confronted by him, after he finds out that Marcus and Mo are charging half the price as his business. Marcus and Mo take their project in a different direction afterwards by starting a "'hood safari". Guest starring: Brenden Jefferson as Blake, Wendy Davis as Hillary Jordan; Co-starring: Rosey Brown as Mr. Jerome, Ashley Malinger as Ronnie, Travis Tedford as Chris; Title Reference: The PSA campaign "Reading is Fundamental" Note: Jason Weaver and guest star Brendan Jefferson previously co-starred together on the 1993-1994 ABC sitcom, Thea.
36	7	"T.A. or Not T.A."	Lex Passaris	Howard Nemetz	November 1, 1998	W636	3.25
Coach Gerber takes over as math teacher, but he needs T.J.'s help as a teacher's assistant. Marcus is pressured by Floyd to pull up his slumping grades, and he resorts to even trying to get T.J. to do his homework assignment. When Marcus, who doesn't think he needs to study because he wants to make it big as a musician -- ends up passing his test, he and Floyd have a chat about Marcus' academic future. Meanwhile, Yvette meets a guy named Calvin and is shocked to discover is actually 15 years old and a sophomore. When she makes a speech to the entire school cafeteria, that she is no longer ashamed that she is going out with him, Calvin drops a bomb and tells Yvette that he is now seeing a sophomore -- who attends Howard University. Guest starring: Dann Florek as Coach Gerber, Tinsley Grimes as Nina, Chad Haywood as Calvin; Co-starring: Vanessa Rice as Rosalinda, Jarrett Lennon as Student Title Reference: The line "To Be, or Not to Be", from William Shakespeare's Hamlet
37	8	"Boomerang"	Jimmy Hampton	Tammy Gordon	November 8, 1998	W639	4.51
T.J. is forced to take wood shop and finds out it's not as easy as he thought. When Mo is assigned as his tutor, T.J. accidentally injures him; but T.J. discovers he can get a good grade if Floyd "helps" him with the project. When Marcus gets Floyd to see what T.J is up to, he convinces his son to do the project himself, even if he doesn't get a good grade on the project. Meanwhile after doubting that men and women can be friends after an incident between her and another student, Ramone, while working on the school paper (while working, he had forcefully kissed her), Yvette meets a student named Victor, who is an aspiring photographer and she eventually becomes shocked to discover that she has a crush on him. Similarly to Ramone, she forcefully kisses him while working on the project. This makes things between her and Victor awkward, but she takes the opportunity to forgive Ramone. Guest starring: Dale Godboldo as Victor, Cirroc Lofton as Ramone, Blake Clark as Mr. Petrasek; Co-starring: J.D. Walsh as Mackey, Taraji P. Henson as Leslie, Haylie Johnson as Hannah, Carmen Filpi as Janitor; Title Reference: The 1992 romantic comedy film Boomerang Note: This is Cirroc Lofton's second appearance on the show. Lofton previously appeared as Lester in the first season episode "The Code".
38	9	"Get a Job"	Joe Regalbuto	Adam Lapidus	November 15, 1998	W638	3.95
When Floyd tells the kids to get jobs to pay for things they want, Yvette gets a job at a clothing store at the mall that her friend Nina is also working at, and they both discover that the manager is racist after Ms. Hendra tells Nina to follow black customers around to make sure that they don't steal. Meanwhile, Marcus and Mo get a late night shift at a radio station as hosts of their own talk show, but after they end up falling asleep in the kitchen just before going to school one day, Floyd finds out what is going on. Guest starring: J.D. Walsh as Mackey, Tinsley Grimes as Nina, Janice Kent as Ms. Hendra; Co-starring: Tony Winters as R.J. Reese, Debra D. Holt as Delores; Absent: Tahj Mowry as T.J. Henderson Note: This is the only episode of the series to not have T.J. (an unusual instance in which the lead of a television series is entirely absent from an episode), as it is mentioned earlier in the episode that he was sent to Geology Camp.
39	10	"A Date with Destiny"	Jimmy Hampton	Ralph Greene	November 22, 1998	W640	3.90
Marcus, T.J., Yvette and Mo all auditioned for a role as a backup dancer in a Destiny's Child music video. When T.J. lands the role, and gets an offer to perform with the group on a world tour of the United States and Europe — his dad Floyd does not approve of the idea, and tries to convince T.J. that it is not the kind of life for a 12-year-old. T.J. fails to understand Floyd's concern, until he hears Beyoncé talking to Marcus, after coming home from a school dance where Marcus, Mo and T.J. took all the members of the R&B girl group, about how she misses spending time at home in Texas with her family and friends. Meanwhile, Mo tries to get Mackadocious a record deal, by trying to get Marcus to give Beyoncé a demo tape of the band, but when he refuses because he wants to get to know Beyoncé better and does not want her to think he is using her, Mo takes matters into his own hands. Guest starring: Destiny's Child (LaTavia Roberson, Kelly Rowland, Beyoncé Knowles, LeToya Luckett) as Themselves; Co-starring: Burt Bulos as Rudy, Alec Ledd as Lenny, George Sharperson as Security Guard Note: Dulé Hill, who guest starred as Mr. Tierney in season two's "Gotta Dance", helped choreograph the dance sequences in the episode, along with Lorriane Fields.
40	11	"Break Up Not to Make Up"	John Ferraro	Ralph Greene	November 29, 1998	W632	N/A
When Marcus and his girlfriend Dana break up, Mo steps in and goes out with Dana to a concert behind Marcus' back, creating tension between the two best friends. Marcus and Mo interrupt Floyd's date, asking for advice on the matter and the guys end up reconciling. Meanwhile, T.J. faces gym class and showering in the locker room for the first time -- and tries any way to avoid showering in gym class, because he is the "smallest" one in his gym class. Guest starring: Dann Florek as Coach Gerber, J.D. Walsh as Mackey, Tinsley Grimes as Nina Co-starring: Taraji P. Henson as Leslie, Ebonie Smith as Dana, Sandy Brown as Maxine
41	12	"Diary of a Mad Schoolgirl"	Eric Meza	Douglas Tuber & Tim Maile	December 13, 1998	W641	4.33
Marcus sees a dating opportunity with a girl named Janice, who is T.J.'s partner on an assignment on the Lizzie Borden murders, and he concocts a plan to become the man Janice wants after her online diary accidentally ends up on T.J.'s computer. But he starts to realize that the object of his affection may be too zealous, after finding out that she wants to get married soon, and wants Marcus to meet her dead grandmother at the funeral. Later after Marcus breaks up with Janice, she comes after him and T.J. wearing a pig mask and holding a meat cleaver, but the joke is on the boys as they find out that it was all a plan by Janice, Yvette and Alicia after they find out that Marcus and T.J. have been reading her online diary. Meanwhile, Floyd and Mo bond over grilling and end up getting carried away with their new pastime. Guest starring: Natasha Williams as Janice Walker, Jordan Wood as Alicia Note: This Natashia Williams's second appearance. Her first appearance on the show was in the season one episode "Lab Rats".
42	13	"Perchance to Dream"	Lex Passaris	Frank Dungan & Michael Baser	January 10, 1999	W643	3.29
Yvette is annoyed when she has a recurring dream in which she marries Mo, so she decides to figure out what the dreams really mean. Yvette decides to ask Mo out on a date, to find out if she has feelings for him. Meanwhile, Marcus, T.J., and Mo start a "Homework Hotline" to earn extra cash, but Marcus and Mo go overboard when they add more phone lines and force T.J. to cut back on call times (thus preventing him from giving the callers more thorough help) in order to make more money, leaving Floyd to intervene and put the business back to basics. Guest starring: J.D. Walsh as Mackey, Jordan Wood as Alicia
43	14	"From A to Double D"	Mark Cendrowski	Rachelle Romberg	January 17, 1999	W642	4.31
A dejected Yvette decides she needs breast augmentation after another actress is picked for a role she wanted in a play, but Floyd balks at her decision. At an audition, she wears a pair of falsies in order to see if it would help get her the part, only to discover Mo is at the audition as well. At home, Yvette talks to Floyd and decides that she doesn't want the surgery -- unless she is absolutely sure it is what she wanted. Meanwhile, T.J. is harassed by bullies who make fun of his ears. So Marcus and Mo decide to teach T.J. how to beat them at their own game by teaching him "the dozens". Guest starring: Tinsley Grimes as Nina, Jesse Flanagan as Tucker, Jennifer Lyons as Lisa Co-starring: George LeMore as Darryl, Mailon Rivera as Simon, Jim Hanks as Director
44	15	"Can't Buy Me, Love"	Mark Cendrowski	Douglas Tuber & Tim Maile	January 24, 1999	W644	3.81
To try to enlighten Mo about feminism, Yvette decides to buy him at a school slave auction, but Mo quickly tires of Yvette -- leaving him to come up with a plan to make Yvette tired of him and see that she shouldn't push her beliefs on him. But in the end, he discovers that some of what Yvette taught him made sense. Meanwhile, Coach Gerber buys T.J. at the auction and has T.J. help him do his taxes and Marcus is auctioned off to a rich, lonely teenage boy, who decided to "buy" his friendship -- and bosses him around. Guest starring: Dann Florek as Coach Gerber, Joshua Gibran Mayweather as Cordell Ross; Co-starring: LaKeisha Penn as Jasmine, Christina Milian as Pretty Girl, Ashlee Turner as Paula, Ronald Robinson as Jonathan Title Reference: The 1987 drama film Can't Buy Me Love Note: This is Christina Milian's second appearance. Her first appearance on the show was in the season one episode "Don't Do That Thing You Do".
45	16	"It Takes Two"	Mark Cendrowski	Ralph Greene	February 7, 1999	W645	4.87
While at the mall with Floyd, Marcus catches Mo's new girlfriend Tracy out with another guy, but he cannot decide how to tell Mo. When he does, Mo has a disagreement with Marcus, suggesting that he either "get over it or get to walkin'" when he thinks Marcus is lying about seeing Tracy cheat on him. Meanwhile, T.J. writes an angry letter to the White House and worries that he might be in trouble with the CIA. When Marcus sees Tracy with her old boyfriend at the movie theater, he tries to get Mo to come and see her for the person she really is. Guest starring: Bianca Lawson as Tracy, David Michael as Will; Co-starring: James K. Ward as Mr. Militich, Richard Simms as Mr. Baser, Ethan Young as Kid; Title Reference: The 1988 hip-hop hit song It Takes Two by Rob Base and DJ E-Z Rock Note: This is Bianca Lawson's second appearance. She previously played Shirley in the season 1 finale "Baby, It's You and You and You".
46	17	"I Was a Teenage Sports Wife"	Joe Regalbuto	Adam Lapidus	February 14, 1999	W647	5.40
Marcus scores a date with Danita "The Hammer" Mills, the star player of the girls' volleyball team, but plays second string socially. After a disagreement over him taking a backseat in their relationship, Danita's playing suffers, leaving Marcus to try and smooth things over. Meanwhile, T.J. tries to boost Mo's brainpower by making him think that some sugar pills will make him smarter, a plan which backfires when Mo tells all the underachieving students in school about it. Guest starring: Kent Masters King as Danita "The Hammer" Mills, Megan Cavanagh as Coach Frayda; Co-starring: Sebastian Tillinger as Sebastian, Krishna LeFan as Barry, Josh Raisin as Leo Note: This is the second time a guest character on the show who is written as a student athlete has the nickname of "The Hammer". The first time was in the season two episode "Most Hated Man on Campus", when T.J. tutors Anthony "The Hammer" Williams.
47	18	"Crushed"	Danny Kallis	Tammy Gordon	February 21, 1999	W646	3.3
T.J. develops a crush on his science teacher, Ms. Cauldwell, and gets upset when Floyd starts dating her after he thinks that T.J. was setting him up with her. Meanwhile, Marcus is accidentally offered a basketball scholarship to a university after being mistaken for another high school student with the same name as him -- who actually lives in Washington State. Guest starring: Dawn McMillian as Natalie Cauldwell
48	19	"Cross Talk"	Jeff McCracken	Story by : Ralph Greene; Teleplay by : Douglas Tuber & Tim Maile	April 4, 1999	W649	2.88
When T.J. calls in to a political TV talk show, he gets an offer from the show's host to fill in for his favorite panelist Pete Gilroy, who is going to rehab for his drinking problem. But T.J.'s fresh style gives him a permanent spot on the show and ends up replacing Pete permanently, which leads him to hang out at the Hendersons house and T.J. figuring out how to get fired from the show. Meanwhile, Marcus and Mo discover online auctions, and sell some junk -- and Floyd's Beverly Hillbillies lunchbox from when he was a kid. Guest starring: Brian Doyle-Murray as Pete Gilroy, Keone Young as Ted Shaw Co-starring: Kim Johnston Ulrich as Sandy Banks-Hastings, Michael McCarty as Ballard Murtaugh, Mark Chaet as David Sherman, Steve Luchsinger as Stage Manager
49	20	"The Soda Wars" "Soda Wars"	Joe Regalbuto	Howard Nemetz	May 2, 1999	W648	3.71
T.J. finds out that Colonel Bubble soda has raised their price from 80¢ to $1.10. Angered over the rising soda prices, he decides to brew his own soda called "Admiral T.J." and sell it at the school with Marcus, Mo and Yvette helping. But when the suits at Colonel Bubble see T.J. as a threat, they try to take down his business. Guest starring: Paulette Braxton as Jessica Fox, J.D. Walsh as Mackey, Lou Felder as Mr. Breslin; Co-starring: James K. Ward as Mr. Militich, Robert Briscoe Evans as Axler, Mary Kate McGeehan as Secretary; Note: The end scene of the episode features Mo in a parody of the Pepsi One commercials that starred Cuba Gooding Jr., older brother of Mo's actor, Omar Gooding. This is the only episode of the series that features a blooper real during the end credits. Title Reference: The 1977 space opera film Star Wars
50	21	"The Graduate"	Danny Kallis	Story by : Tammy Gordon; Teleplay by : Adam Lapidus & Howard Nemetz	May 9, 1999	W651	2.54
Yvette wants to protest the speaker at the senior graduation ceremony, and boycotts the school. But when the speaker drops out, Yvette still doesn't want to go, only for Floyd to find out that it is because her late mother won't be there to see her graduate. Meanwhile, T.J., Marcus and Mo plan a class prank, after they, Mackey and the rest of the junior class get the fire sprinklers turned on them during a "Junior Class Pancake Breakfast", but when their plan fails, Mackey decides to streak across the stage (a plan he had the whole time). Guest starring: J.D. Walsh as Mackey, Dann Florek as Coach Gerber, Tinsley Grimes as Nina, James K. Ward as Mr. Militich; Title Reference: The 1967 drama film The Graduate Note: This episode was intended as the series finale, but it was originally aired before the episode "Never Too Young".
51	22	"Never Too Young"	David Kendall	Steve Young	May 16, 1999	W650	3.95
T.J. sulks about having to go to a 12-year-old's birthday party —— and discovers that he has a hard time fitting in with kids his age. But when he meets some of his old classmates from his old school and they start drinking beer, he joins in. Floyd refuses to believe Yvette's intimation that T.J. drank after she suspects something was off with T.J. the day after the party and T.J. lies to Floyd about the drinking incident after a parent calls him. Later, T.J.'s friends stop by and the three of them are caught by Floyd with alcohol. Furious, Floyd tells T.J. is grounded "forever" for lying to him. Floyd apologizes to Yvette and discusses how to handle talking to T.J. about drinking. Meanwhile while on cafeteria duty after they accidentally hit Vice Principal Militich with a piece of bread pudding, Marcus and Mo become disgusted with the slop lunch lady Mrs. Tudjman serves and decide to cook some real food, which doesn't go over well with the students. Guest starring: Marianne Muellerleile as Mrs. Tudjman, J.D. Walsh as Mackey, Vincent Berry as Rich, Mitchah Williams as Kevin; Co-starring: Naya Rivera as Kelly, James K. Ward as Mr. Militich, Brandon Gilberstadt as Josh, Antoinette Picatto as Sarah, Natalie Marston as Randy, Nathan West as Paul Note: This is Naya Rivera's second appearance on the show. Rivera previously appeared as Tonya in the season 1 finale "Baby, It's You and You and You".
