= TNet =

Intranet of the White House

TNet is a secure top-secret-level intranet system in the White House, notably used to record information about telephone and video calls between the President of the United States and other world leaders. TNet is connected to Joint Worldwide Intelligence Communications System (JWICS), which is used more widely across different offices in the White House. Contained within TNet is an even more secure system known as NSC Intelligence Collaboration Environment (NICE).

== NSC Intelligence Collaboration Environment ==
The NSC Intelligence Collaboration Environment (NICE) is a computer system operated by the United States National Security Council's Directorate for Intelligence Programs. A subdomain of TNet, it was created to enable staff to produce and store documents, such as presidential findings or decision memos, on top secret codeword activities. Due to the extreme sensitivity of the material held on it, only about 20 percent of NSC staff can reportedly access the system. The documents held on the system are tightly controlled and only specific named staff are able to access files.

The system became the subject of controversy during the Trump–Ukraine scandal, when a whistleblower complaint to the Inspector General of the Intelligence Community revealed that NICE had been used to store transcripts of calls between President Donald Trump, and foreign leaders, apparently to restrict access to them. The system was reportedly used for this purpose from 2017 after leaks of conversations with foreign leaders. It was said to have been upgraded in the spring of 2018 to log, who had accessed particular files, as a deterrent against possible leaks.

== See also ==
- Classified website
- Intellipedia
- Joint Worldwide Intelligence Communications System (JWICS)
- NIPRNet
- RIPR
- SIPRNet
