= OpenNet =

OpenNet may refer to the following:

- OpenNet, the original name for B92.net, the Internet division of Serbian radio and television broadcaster B92; see B92 § B92.net (ex OpenNet)
- OpenNet, a sensitive but unclassified network that supports e-mail and data applications of the U.S. State Department domestically and abroad; see Classified United States website § OpenNet
- OpenNet Initiative, a joint project with the goal of monitoring and reporting internet filtering and surveillance practices by nations
- OpenNet Singapore OpenNet Singapore, a joint venture of four companies building a national broadband network
- OpenNet (website), a Russian news site about free and open-source software
- OpenNet (organization), a South Korean Non-governmental organization
- OpenNet (ISP), a Cambodian ISP that shut down operations in February 2022.
