= Global Command and Control System =

U.S. military decision support system

Global Command and Control System (GCCS) is the United States' armed forces DoD joint command and control (C2) system used to provide accurate, complete, and timely information for the operational chain of command for U.S. armed forces. "GCCS" is most often used to refer to the computer system, but actually consists of hardware, software, common procedures, appropriation, and numerous applications and interfaces that make up an "operational architecture" that provides worldwide connectivity with all levels of command. GCCS incorporates systems that provide situational awareness, support for intelligence, force planning, readiness assessment, and deployment applications that battlefield commanders require to effectively plan and execute joint military operations.

== History ==
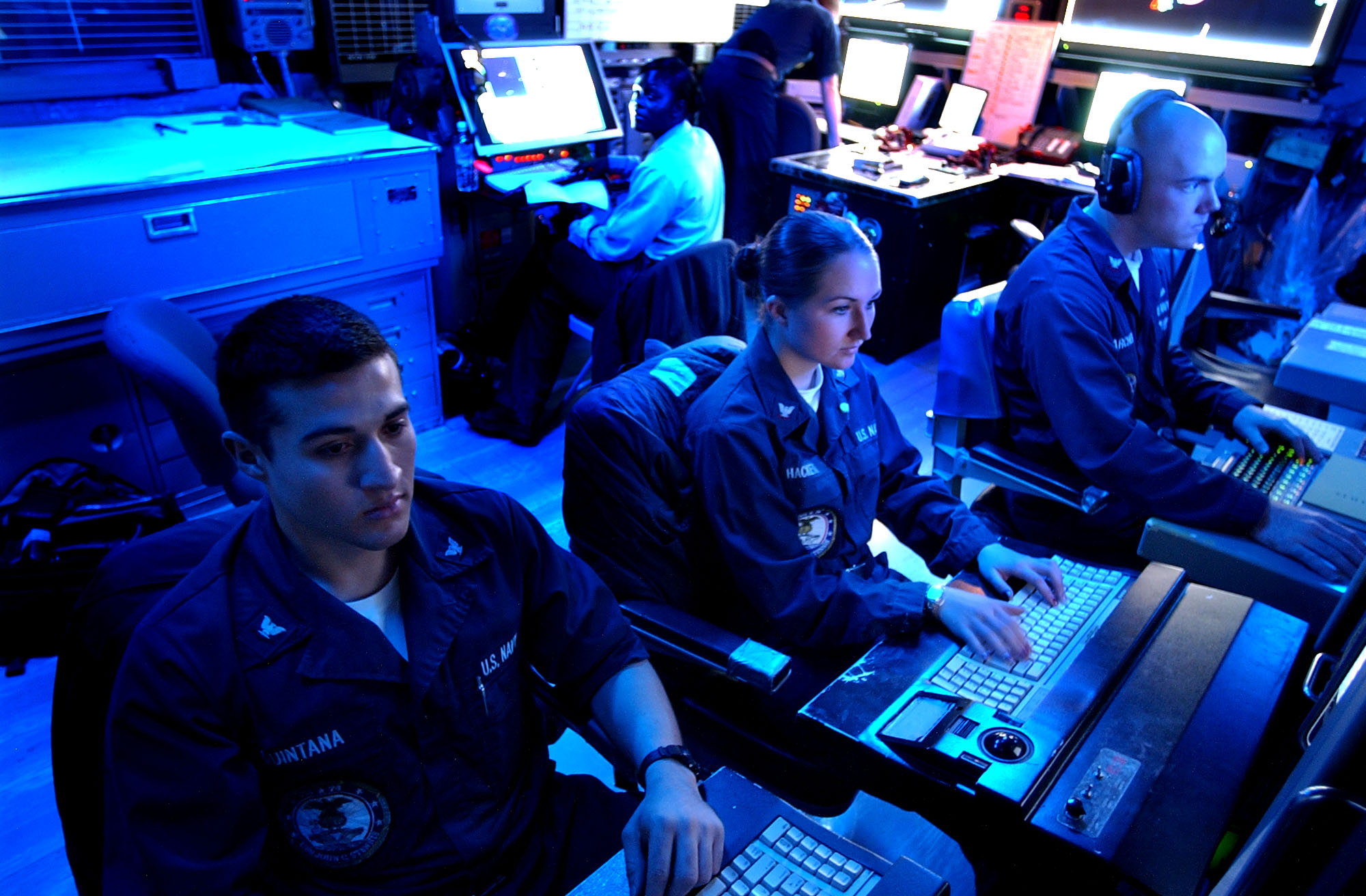
Operations Specialists monitor (GCCS) in the Combat Direction Center (CDC) aboard the Nimitz-class aircraft carrier USS John C. Stennis (CVN-74).

GCCS evolved from earlier predecessors such as TBMCS (Theater Battle Management Core Systems), Joint Operations Tactical System (JOTS), and Joint Maritime Command Information System (JMCIS). It fulfilled requirements for technological, procedural and security improvements to the aging Worldwide Military Command and Control System (WWMCCS) plus its TEMPEST requirement of Cold War defenses from wiretapping and electromagnetic signal interception that include physical (special wire and cabinet shielding, double locks) and operational (special access passes and passwords) measures. On August 30, 1996, the Defense Information Systems Agency (DISA) officially decommissioned WWMCCS and the Joint Staff declared the Global Command and Control System (GCCS) as the joint command and control system of record.

== Applications, functionality ==
GCCS systems comprise various data processing and web services which are used by many applications supporting combat operations, troop/force movements (JOPES), intelligence analysis and production, targeting, ground weapons and radar analysis, and terrain and weather analysis. Some next-generation applications designed for GCCS may support collaboration using chat systems, newsgroups, and email. (See JOPES, Mob/ODEE, etc.)

GCCS supports six mission areas (operations, mobilization, deployment, employment, sustainment, and intelligence) through eight functional areas: threat identification and assessment, strategy planning aids, course of action development, execution planning, implementation, monitoring, risk analysis, and a common tactical picture.

== Connectivity ==
GCCS may use NIPRNet, SIPRNet, JWICS, or other IP based networks for connectivity. In some installations, GCCS aggregates over 94 different sources of data.

== Components/variants ==
- GCCS-A Army
- GCCS-AF Air Force
- GCCS-I Intelligence
- GCCS-J Marine Corps, Joint Forces
- GCCS-M (Maritime) (Navy, Coast Guard)

The Navy's life cycle development of what is currently referred to as the Global Command and Control System, was and continues to be evolutionary in nature and will probably never result in a permanent system. From the early 1980s when SPAWARs PD-40 VADM Jerry O. Tuttle's Joint Operations Tactical System was the premier system, through the tenure of RADM John Gauss's Joint Maritime Command Information System (JMCIS), the final product would be realized as the Global Command and Control System (GCCS), introduced conceptually by the Defense Information Systems Agency (DISA).

== See also ==
- Keyhole Markup Language (Enables GCSS Fusion)
- Worldwide Military Command and Control System
