= Defense Information System Network =

United States Department of Defense's enterprise telecommunications

The Defense Information Systems Network (DISN) has been the United States Department of Defense's enterprise telecommunications network for providing data, video, and voice services for 40 years.

== Components ==
The DISN end-to-end infrastructure is composed of three major segments:

- The sustaining base (eg. base, post, camp, or station, and Service enterprise networks). The Command, Control, Communications, Computers and Intelligence (C4I) infrastructure will interface with the long-haul network to support the deployed warfighter. The sustaining base segment is primarily the responsibility of the individual Services.
- The long-haul transport infrastructure, which includes the communication systems and services between the fixed environments and the deployed Joint Task Force (JTF) and/or Coalition Task Force (CTF) warfighter. The long-haul telecommunications infrastructure segment is primarily the responsibility of DISA.
- The deployed warfighter, mobile users, and associated Combatant Commander telecommunications infrastructures are supporting the Joint Task Force (JTF) and/or Coalition Task Force (CTF). The deployed warfighter and associated Combatant Commander telecommunications infrastructure is primarily the responsibility of the individual Services.

== Services ==
The DISN provides the following multiple networking services:

- Global Content Delivery System (GCDS)
- Data Services
  - Sensitive but Unclassified (NIPRNet)
  - Secret Data Services (SIPRNet)
  - Multicast
- Organizational Messaging

The Organizational Messaging Service provides a range of assured services to the customer community that includes the military services, DoD agencies, combatant commands (CCMDs), non-DoD U.S. government activities, and the Intelligence Community (IC). These services include the ability to exchange official information between military organizations and to support interoperability with allied nations, non-DoD activities, and the IC operating in both the strategic/fixed-base and the tactical/deployed environments. Organizational Messaging supports the assured secure delivery of organizational messages within strict service parameters. This includes delivery times of three minutes or less for high precedence (flash and above) messages across the DISA-provided infrastructure. Additionally, information confidentiality and integrity are guaranteed through the use of NSA-approved Fortezza-based encryption and signature between the Automated Message Handling Systems (AMHSs) operated/maintained by the Services/agencies/COCOMs.

- Satellite
  - Commercial Satellite (COMSATCOM)
  - Distributed Tactical Communications System (DTCS)
  - International Maritime Satellite (INMARSAT)
  - Joint Internet Protocol Modem (JIPM)
- Transport

Dedicated service is a private-line-transport service that provides point-to-point connectivity to mission partner locations. DISA mission partners require dedicated point-to-point layer 1 and layer 2 circuits because of the inherent simplicity and security. To satisfy this demand, Dedicated services are currently offered and are available in a variety of bit rates and interfaces.

- Voice
  - Multilevel Secure Voice (DRSN)
  - SBU Voice (VoIP and DSN)
  - TS/SCI Voice (JWICS)
  - Voice ISP-PSTN
  - Voice over Secure IP (VoSIP)
  - Enterprise Classified Voice over Internet Protocol (ECVoIP)
  - Enterprise Voice over Internet Protocol (EVoIP)

The technical core of the DISN is provided by the capabilities built by DISA from 2002–2006 called the Global Information Grid-Bandwidth Expansion (GIG-BE). This program remains to this day the core of the services provided by DISA to serve the United States. As one of few on time, within budget, to required performance standard DoD ACAT 1AM programs, GIG-BE shows how a government integrated, contractor assisted acquisition can achieve transformational results. The $877 million programs was the largest DoD information technology transport structure ever built. GIG-BE created a ubiquitous "bandwidth-available" environment to improve national security intelligence, surveillance, reconnaissance, information assurance, and command and control at locations worldwide. After extensive component integration and operational testing, implementation began in early 2004 and extended through 2005. GIG-BE achieved initial operational capability (IOC) at six sites 30 Sept. 2004. On 20 Dec. 2005, the GIG-BE program achieved the milestone of full operational capability at all of the almost 100 Joint Staff approved sites.

== End-to-End ==
As defined in CJCSI 6211.02C, Defense Information Systems Network (DISN) Policy and Responsibilities, 9 July 2008, end-to-end is defined as the fusion of requisite components to deliver a defined capability. For the GIG, this implies components from the user access and display devices and sensors to the various levels of networking and processing, associated applications, and related transport and management services. For DISN services, end-to-end encompasses service user to service user (e.g., PC-to-PC, phone-to-phone).

== See also ==
- Defense Data Network
- SIPRNet
- NIPRNet
