= John Ferraro (disambiguation) =

John Ferraro (1924–2001) was an All-American college player and Los Angeles city council member.

John Ferraro may also refer to:

- John Ferraro, American profession wrestler, known by his ring name Gino Martino
- John A. Ferraro (1946–2010), American director and actor
- John Ferraro (Canadian football) (1910– 1981), Canadian football player
