= Defense Data Network =

The Defense Data Network (DDN) was a computer networking effort of the United States Department of Defense from 1983 through 1995. It was based on ARPANET technology.

== History ==
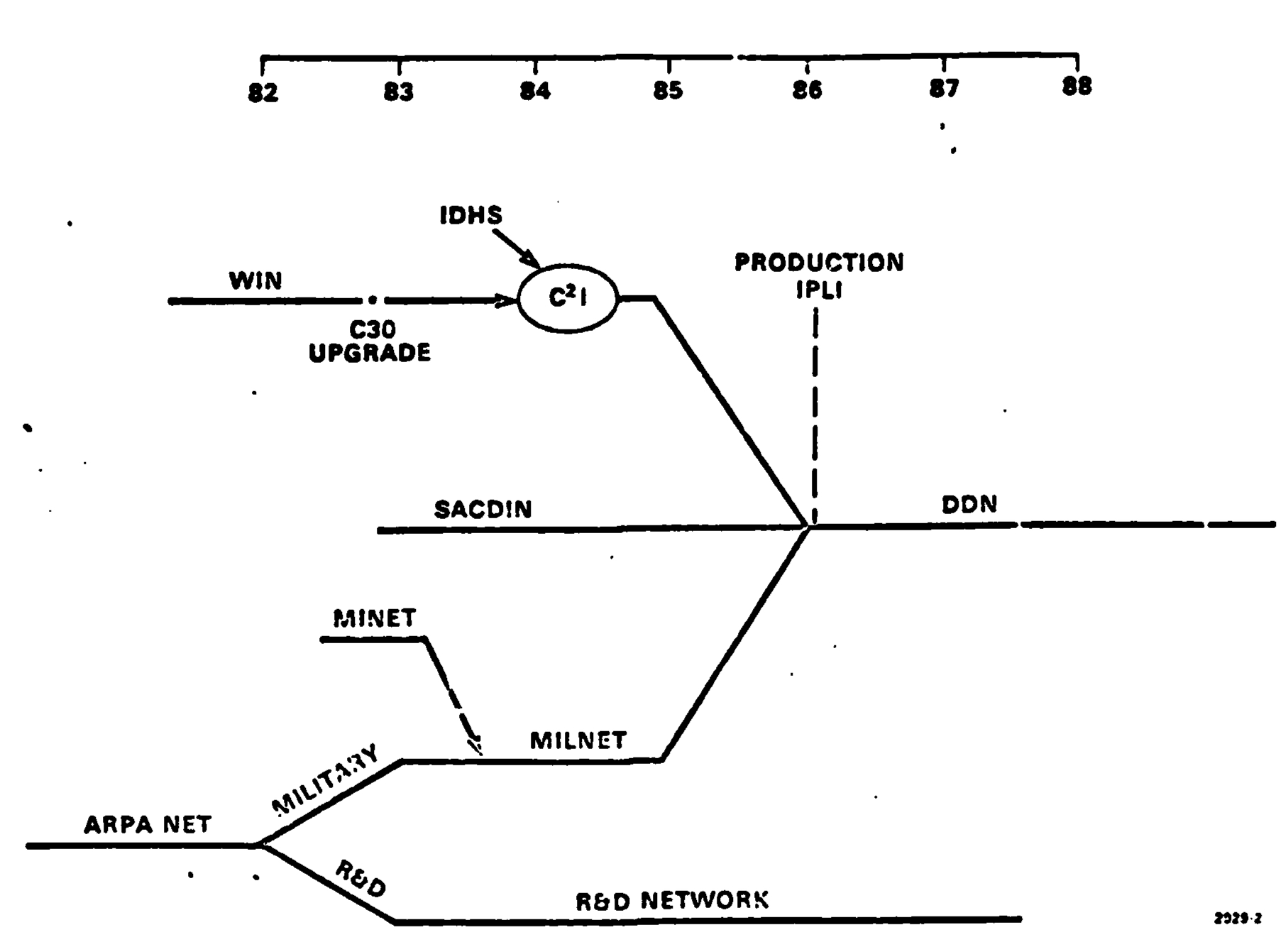
Project plan for creating the Defense Data Network, as envisioned by the Defense Science Board, December 1982

As an experiment, from 1971 to 1977, the Worldwide Military Command and Control System (WWMCCS) purchased and operated an ARPANET-type system from BBN Technologies for the Prototype WWMCCS Intercomputer Network (PWIN). The experiments proved successful enough that it became the basis of the much larger WIN system. Six initial WIN sites in 1977 increased to 20 sites by 1981.

In 1975, the Defense Communication Agency (DCA) took over operation of the ARPANET as it became an operational tool in addition to an ongoing research project. At that time, the Automatic Digital Network (AUTODIN), carried most of the Defense Department's message traffic. Starting in 1972, attempts had been made to introduce some packet switching into its planned replacement, AUTODIN II. AUTODIN II development proved unsatisfactory, however, and in 1982, AUTODIN II was canceled, to be replaced by a combination of several packet-based networks that would connect military installations.

The DCA used "Defense Data Network" (DDN) as the program name for this new network. Under its initial architecture, as developed by the Institute for Defense Analysis, the DDN would consist of two separate instances: the unclassified MILNET, which would be split off the ARPANET; and a classified network, also based on ARPANET technology, which would provide services for WIN, DODIIS, and SACDIN. C/30 packet switches, developed by BBN Technologies as upgraded Interface Message Processors, would provide the network technology. End-to-end encryption would be provided by ARPANET encryption devices, namely the Internet Private Line Interface (IPLI) or Blacker.

After MILNET was split away, the ARPANET would continue be used as an Internet backbone for researchers, but be slowly phased out. Both networks carried unclassified information, and were connected at a small number of points which would allow total separation in the event of an emergency.

As a large-scale, private internet, the DDN provided Internet Protocol connectivity across the United States and to US military bases abroad. The Defense Communications Engineering Center (DCEC), part of DCA, handled DDN network engineering and DDN network operations. The DCEC was located in Reston, Virginia from the mid-1980s until it was closed and merged with a DISA site in Bailey's Crossroads, Virginia in the early 2000s (long after DCA had been merged into the new Defense Information Systems Agency (DISA)).

Throughout the 1980s it expanded as a set of four parallel military networks, each at a different security level. The networks were:

- Military Network (MILNET) for UNCLASSIFIED traffic
- Defense Secure Network One (DSNET 1) for SECRET traffic
- Defense Secure Network Two (DSNET 2) for TOP SECRET traffic
- Defense Secure Network Three (DSNET 3) for TOP SECRET/Sensitive Compartmented Information (TS/SCI)

MILNET and DSNET 1 were common user networks, much like the public Internet, but DSNET 2 was dedicated to supporting the Worldwide Military Command and Control System (WWMCCS) and DSNET 3 was dedicated to supporting the DOD Intelligence Information System (DODIIS). These networks transitioned to become the NIPRNET, SIPRNET, and JWICS networks in the 1990s.

=== DDN-NIC ===
DDN-NIC or Network Information Center (NIC) was located at the DDN Installation and Integration Support (DIIS) program office in Chantilly, Virginia. It provided general reference services to DDN users via telephone, electronic mail, and U.S. mail. It was the first organization responsible for the assignment of TCP/IP addresses and Autonomous System numbers.

== See also ==
- Defense Information Systems Network (DISN)
