= The Adventures of Rocky and Bullwinkle (film) =

2000 film directed by Des McAnuff

- Theatrical release poster
- Directed by: Des McAnuff
- Written by: Kenneth Lonergan
- Based on: The Adventures of Rocky and Bullwinkle and Friends by Jay Ward
- Produced by: Robert De Niro; Jane Rosenthal
- Starring: June Foray; Keith Scott; Rene Russo; Jason Alexander; Randy Quaid; Kel Mitchell; Kenan Thompson; Piper Perabo; Robert De Niro
- Cinematography: Thomas E. Ackerman
- Edited by: Dennis Virkler
- Music by: Mark Mothersbaugh
- Production companies: Tribeca Productions; Capella Films
- Distributed by: Universal Pictures
- Release date: June 30, 2000
- Running time: 92 minutes
- Country: United States
- Language: English
- Budget: $76 million
- Box office: $35.1 million

The Adventures of Rocky and Bullwinkle is a 2000 American live-action animated adventure slapstick comedy film directed by Des McAnuff and written by Kenneth Lonergan, based on the animated television series The Adventures of Rocky and Bullwinkle and Friends by Jay Ward. Animated characters Rocky and Bullwinkle share the screen with live actors portraying Fearless Leader (Robert De Niro, who also co-produced the film), Boris Badenov (Jason Alexander) and Natasha Fatale (Rene Russo), with Randy Quaid, Piper Perabo, Kenan Thompson and Kel Mitchell. June Foray reprises her role as Rocky, while Keith Scott (no relation to original voice actor Bill Scott) voices Bullwinkle and the film's narrator. It also features cameo appearances by performers including James Rebhorn, Paget Brewster, Janeane Garofalo, John Goodman, David Alan Grier, Don Novello, Jon Polito, Carl Reiner, Whoopi Goldberg, Max Grodenchik, Norman Lloyd, Jonathan Winters and Billy Crystal.

The film follows Rocky and Bullwinkle, who are enlisted to help rookie FBI agent Karen Sympathy stop Boris, Natasha and Fearless Leader from taking over the United States.

Released by Universal Pictures on June 30, 2000, the film underperformed at the box office, grossing $35.1 million worldwide against a $76 million budget and received mixed reviews from critics, who criticized its writing, plot and humor, while praising the performances, visual effects and faithfulness to its source material.

== Plot ==
Rocky the Flying Squirrel and Bullwinkle J. Moose live a melancholic life since their television series was canceled in 1964. Their animated home, Frostbite Falls, is deforested, Rocky can no longer fly, and their show's unseen narrator lives with his mother. Meanwhile, their archenemies, Fearless Leader, Boris Badenov and Natasha Fatale, have all lost power in Pottsylvania following the end of the Cold War. They escape by tunneling to a Hollywood film studio, where they trick executive Minnie Mogul into signing a rights contract to their series and greenlighting a potential film, dragging the villains out of the animated world and transforming them into live action characters.

Six months later, Fearless Leader and his minions have founded RBTV ("Really Bad Television"), a cable television network in New York City that is programmed to control the population by brainwashing American audiences to vote for Fearless Leader as the next President of the United States. FBI Director Cappy von Trapment deploys rookie agent Karen Sympathy to recruit Rocky and Bullwinkle to stop RBTV's intended broadcast. Karen travels to a movie-generating lighthouse in Los Angeles, summoning Rocky, Bullwinkle and the Narrator into the real world.

After learning of Rocky and Bullwinkle's return, Fearless Leader deploys Boris and Natasha to destroy them. They are given the CDI ("Computer-Degenerating Imagery"), a laptop-like weapon that can trap cartoon characters within the Internet. Their truck is stolen by Karen, who is swiftly arrested by Oklahoma State Police troopers when Natasha poses as her.

Boris and Natasha steal a helicopter to continue their pursuit. Karen is sent to prison but manipulates a love-struck Swedish guard named Ole to help her escape. Rocky and Bullwinkle are picked up by teens Martin and Lewis, who are students from Bullwinkle's alma mater Wossamotta U. Boris and Natasha launch an elaborate plan to assassinate Bullwinkle, donating a check to the university in his name, inspiring the academic board to award Bullwinkle with an honorary "Mooster's Degree". As Bullwinkle addresses the students, Rocky regains his ability to fly, stopping Boris from killing Bullwinkle with the CDI.

Boris and Natasha chase Rocky and Bullwinkle through Chicago, but inadvertently disintegrate their helicopter in the process. Karen reunites with Rocky and Bullwinkle, but the trio is arrested again by numerous state troopers. They are tried for numerous misdemeanors in ten states, but the presiding Judge Cameo dismisses the charges after recognizing Rocky and Bullwinkle, informing the district attorney that celebrities are above the law.

The trio buys a rickety biplane and evades Boris and Natasha again. The two villains consider retiring, lying to Fearless Leader that they had defeated Rocky and Bullwinkle, confident that they have already won. Meanwhile, the heroes' plane begins to lose altitude due to the combined weight. Rocky, who is flying again, flies Karen to New York to stop the broadcast, but they are captured by Boris and Natasha. Fearless Leader initiates his plan and broadcasts programs to brainwash most of the country.

Bullwinkle crash-lands the plane outside the White House in Washington, D.C., and finds the president to be brainwashed by the RBTV programs, to which Bullwinkle is immune due to his natural stupidity. Cappy finds Bullwinkle and scans him into the White House's computer system, then e-mails him to the studio as Fearless Leader addresses the nation, disrupting the broadcast, and a chaotic fight breaks out, leading to the capture of the villains. Karen, Rocky and Bullwinkle ask the American public to replant Frostbite Falls, and Bullwinkle accidentally activates the CDI, transforming the villains back to their animated forms and banishing them to the Internet forever.

In the aftermath, Rocky and Bullwinkle's careers are renewed in RBTV, now renamed to "Rocky and Bullwinkle Television". Karen goes on a date with Ole, as Rocky, Bullwinkle, and the Narrator return home to a rejuvenated Frostbite Falls.

== Cast ==
- June Foray as the voice of Rocky
  - Foray also voices animated Natasha Fatale and Narrator's Mother
- Keith Scott as the voice of Bullwinkle
  - Scott also voices the Narrator, animated Fearless Leader, animated Boris Badenov, and RBTV Announcer
- Robert De Niro as Fearless Leader
- Rene Russo as Natasha Fatale
- Jason Alexander as Boris Badenov
- Piper Perabo as Karen Sympathy
  - Julia McAnuff as young Karen
- Randy Quaid as Cappy "Frank" von Trapment
- Kel Mitchell as Martin
- Kenan Thompson as Lewis
- David Alan Grier as Measures
- Jon Polito as Schoentell
- James Rebhorn as President Signoff
- Carl Reiner as P.G. Biggershot
- Jonathan Winters as Whoppa Chopper Pilot, Ohio Cop with Bullhorn, Old Jeb
- Rod Biermann as Ole
  - Adam Miller as young Ole
- Paget Brewster as Jenny Spy
- Janeane Garofalo as Minnie Mogul
- John Goodman as Oklahoma State Trooper
- John Brandon as General Admission
- Ed Gale as The Mole
- Lily Nicksay as Sydney
- Don Novello as Fruit Vendor Twins
- Victor Raider-Wexler as Igor
- Phil Proctor as RBTV floor director
- Dian Bachar as RBTV Studio Technician/Scientist
- Drena De Niro as RBTV Lackey
- Jeffrey Ross as District Attorney
- Wesley Mann as Clerk
- Harrison Young as General Foods
- Max Grodénchik and Eugene Alper as Horse Spies
- Alexis Thorpe as Supermodel
- Taraji P. Henson as Left-Wing Student
- Norman Lloyd as Wossamotta U. President
- Mark Holton as FBI Agent - Potato
- Doug Jones as FBI Agent - Carrot
- Arvie Lowe Jr. as Sharp-Eyed Student
- Susan Berman as Bucky Weasel
- Chip Chinery and Ellis E. Williams as Security guards
- Elwood Edwards as "You've got mail" (voice)
- Whoopi Goldberg as Judge Cameo
- Billy Crystal as Mattress salesman

== Production ==
The film entered development at Universal Pictures in 1992, originally with Danny DeVito and Meryl Streep considered to play the antagonists Boris Badenov and Natasha Fatale, respectively. However, the film encountered several lawsuits, production difficulties and concerns about whether the film would stay true to the original animated television series. The film was produced by Universal in association with Robert De Niro's production company TriBeca Productions.

In October 1998, it was announced that Monica Potter had been cast as the lead. De Niro was also announced to be in negotiations for the role of Fearless Leader, with Des McAnuff set to direct from Kenny Lonergan's screenplay. In November 1998, Jason Alexander was cast as Boris Badenov. In January 1999, Rene Russo was cast as Natasha Fatale. In February 1999, Potter dropped out from the lead role and was replaced by Piper Perabo.

During the production of the film, Keith Scott was hired to provide on-set dialogue for Bullwinkle J. Moose and the Narrator to ensure precise comedic timing for the live-action actors. Following the production template set by Charles Fleischer in Who Framed Roger Rabbit, Scott worked on set for six months of principal photography while Industrial Light and Magic developed the CGI animation. He stated that he enjoyed working with De Niro, Alexander, Russo, and actors such as Jonathan Winters, Whoopi Goldberg, John Goodman and Billy Crystal. Although initially contracted for two months, the project became an 18-month assignment for Scott. His duties extended into post-production, where he recorded final voice-over tracks alongside original series voice actress June Foray (who voiced Rocky the Flying Squirrel), followed by a six-week promotional tour.

During a Saturday rehearsal at the Four Seasons hotel with De Niro, Scott and Foray screened classic episodes of the television series. Scott expressed regret that the fictional anthem "Hail Pottsylvania" was missing from the script. De Niro subsequently requested the song's inclusion in the film, which altered the shooting schedule and increased the production budget. Despite the film's eventual box office failure, Scott expressed pride in the project's dedication to honoring Jay Ward's original cartoon style. Corey Burton provided the Narrator's voice for a read-along book and tape adaptation of the film.

=== Visual effects and animation ===
Both visual effects and animation services for the film were provided by Industrial Light and Magic. The animators took inspiration from Who Framed Roger Rabbit to help incorporate cartoon characters in a live-action setting. McAnuff wanted "to maintain the simplicity of the original characters". He also wanted Rocky and Bullwinkle to move three-dimensionally, to go with the three-dimensional real-world space that they occupy in most of the film. As a result, the animators adapted the characters into the modeling and movements of 3D animation but incorporated cel-shaded techniques to help maintain their cartoony overall rendering in their models.

== Reception ==
=== Box office ===
Rocky & Bullwinkle opened in 2,460 venues, earning $6,814,270 in its opening weekend and ranking fifth in the North American box office behind Chicken Run, Me, Myself & Irene, The Patriot and The Perfect Storm and third among the week's new releases, after the latter two films. It closed on October 5, 2000, with a domestic total of $26,005,820, and $9,129,000 in other territories, for a worldwide gross of $35,134,820.

The failure of the film was attributed to it not being fresh enough for young audiences nor appealing to the nostalgia of Baby boomers.

=== Critical response ===
On the review aggregator website Rotten Tomatoes, 42% of 101 critics' reviews are positive, with an average rating of 4.9/10. The website's consensus reads: "Though the film stays true to the nature of the original cartoon, the script is disappointing and not funny." Metacritic, which uses a weighted average, assigned the film a score of 36 out of 100, based on 30 critics, indicating "generally unfavorable" reviews. Audiences surveyed by CinemaScore gave the film a grade "B" on a scale of A+ to F.

A. O. Scott of The New York Times gave the film a negative review and said, "The original "Rocky and Bullwinkle" had sufficient ingenuity to revel in its own dumbness and make an audience reared on Mad magazine feel smart. Their new 'Adventures' are made by people who clearly think themselves much smarter than their audience. In place of whimsy, it offers cynicism."

Joe Leydon of Variety also gave the film a negative review and said, "The latest and least of three recent features based on vintage animated series produced by the late, great Jay Ward, "The Adventures of Rocky and Bullwinkle" scarcely seems worth the expenditure of time, money and talent."

Roger Ebert of the Chicago Sun-Times gave it 3 stars out of 4, and wrote, "Has the same mixture of dumb puns, corny sight gags and sly, even sophisticated in-jokes. It's a lot of fun."

=== Accolades ===
Award	Category	Subject	Result
Stinkers Bad Movie Awards	Worst Resurrection of a TV Show	Universal Pictures	Nominated
Stinkers Bad Movie Awards	Worst Supporting Actress	Rene Russo	Nominated
Golden Raspberry Award	Worst Supporting Actress	Rene Russo	Nominated
Saturn Award	Best Supporting Actress	Rene Russo	Nominated
Saturn Award	Best Supporting Actor	Jason Alexander	Nominated

== Home media ==
The Adventures of Rocky and Bullwinkle was released on VHS and DVD on February 13, 2001, and on Blu-ray on May 15, 2018.

== See also ==
- Bonkers
