= CAVNET =

- The insignia of the 1CD, used as the site's logo
- Website type: Classified United States website on SIPRNet, forum
- Available in: English
- Founded: April 4th, 2004
- Area served: All SIPRNet nodes
- Registration: Relevant SIPRNet account clearance required

CAVNET, short for Cavalry Intranet was a secure military forum developed by the 1st Cavalry Division which became operational in April 2004. A part of SIPRNet, it allows fast access to knowledge acquired on the ground in combat.

It was used in Iraq war, and helps US military forces against the insurgents' adaptive tactics known as TTP by providing data laterally and on a broader scale than with traditional reports.

== History ==
By the counterinsurgency phase of the War in Iraq, insurgent and friendly Tactics, Techniques and Procedures began to emerge a need was seen for a faster, easier and more lateral way for junior commanders within the division to share, read and store information on both enemy and friendly adaptive tactics on the tactical level. Senior leadership were initially concerned that the creation of such a forum may cause them to lose control over the flow of classified information, however unit commanders convinced them of the value the system would bring and CAVNET became operational on April 4, 2004, being hosted on SIPRNet.

By February 22, 2005, the site had grown massively; with 50,000 message views and 100,000 hits per month and over 30 mission categories, ranging from "Civil Military Operations" to "Gear". The Staff Judge Advocate was using the forums to send out messages relating to rules of engagement and was also ensuring that all content posted to the forums abided by US ROE.

The data shared between patrols on "The Net" (as is it is sometimes referred to by soldiers) has already played a crucial role to dismantle grenade-traps hidden behind posters of Moqtada al-Sadr that US soldiers often rip down.
