= NATO CRONOS =

Computer networks for classified information

Crisis Response Operations in NATO Operating Systems (CRONOS) is a system of interconnected computer networks used by NATO to transmit classified information. It provides NATO Secret level operations, with access to NATO intelligence applications and databases. As of 1999, a wide area network of Windows NT computers used in NATO in Europe. CRONOS provides e-mail, the Microsoft office suite, etc. It provides informal messaging (e-mail) and information sharing within the NATO community. There is no connectivity between CRONOS and any US network or with the coalition wide area network.

== See also ==
- SIPRNet – U.S. Secret Internet Protocol Router Network
- RIPR – U.S. / Korea Coalition Network
- UK Networks
  - Joint Operational Command System (JOCS)
  - Defence Information Infrastructure
  - Foreign and Commonwealth Office's (FCO) FIRECREST
