= Smart Guy =

American television sitcom (1997–1999)

- Genre: Sitcom
- Created by: Danny Kallis
- Starring: Tahj Mowry; John Marshall Jones; Jason Weaver; Omar Gooding; Essence Atkins
- Theme music composer: Kristian Rex (seasons 1–2); Hami (season 3)
- Opening theme: Performed by: Kristian Rex (seasons 1–2); Hami featuring Omar Gooding (season 3)
- Composer: Kurt Farquhar
- Country of origin: United States
- Original language: English
- No. of seasons: 3
- No. of episodes: 51 (list of episodes)

Production
- Executive producers: Bob Young; Danny Kallis; Suzanne de Passe; Suzanne Coston
- Camera setup: Videotape; Multi-camera
- Running time: 22 minutes
- Production companies: de Passe Entertainment; Danny Kallis Productions; Walt Disney Television

Original release
- Network: The WB
- Release: April 2, 1997 – May 16, 1999

Smart Guy is an American sitcom television series centering on the exploits of child prodigy T.J. Henderson (Tahj Mowry), who moves from being an elementary school student in the fourth grade to a high school student in the tenth grade, attending the same school as his two elder siblings Yvette and Marcus. Created by Danny Kallis, the series ran for three seasons and 51 episodes on The WB from April 2, 1997, to May 16, 1999. The series was produced by de Passe Entertainment and Danny Kallis Productions, in association with Walt Disney Television. In an interview in September 2020, Mowry confirmed that a revival of the show was in the works.

== Overview ==
Set in Washington, D.C., the show centers on the misadventures of boy genius and youngest child T.J. Henderson (Tahj Mowry), who at the age of 10 moves from elementary school and gets transferred to Piedmont High School, where he ends up becoming a high school freshman with teenagers as his classmates. He must adjust to the life with older, but not necessarily wiser, high school teenagers – including his brother Marcus (Jason Weaver) and Marcus' best friend Mo (Omar Gooding). Episodes typically deal with T.J.'s missteps of trying to fit in as a kid genius, while being a small kid in high school, as well as the contrast between his smarts and his brother's underachieving nature.

Older brother Marcus Henderson, the sophomore underachieving middle child, also deals with teenage problems, such as finding a date and doing homework (though he sometimes tries to get T.J. to do his homework for him). Their father Floyd Henderson (John Marshall Jones), a widowed single father who owns his own roofing business, deals with the problems of raising his three kids: Yvette, Marcus and T.J., since his wife's death. Floyd's only daughter, and Marcus and T.J.'s older sister Yvette (Essence Atkins), usually is the level-headed member of the family – similar to Floyd in that respect – and is the typical overachieving student.

== Episodes ==
Season	Episodes	Originally released	
Season	Episodes	First released	Last released
1	7	April 2, 1997	May 14, 1997
2	22	September 10, 1997	May 13, 1998
3	22	September 20, 1998	May 16, 1999

== Characters ==
=== Main ===
The series main cast (from left); Mo (Omar Gooding), Floyd (John Marshall Jones), T.J. (Tahj Mowry), Yvette (Essence Atkins) and Marcus (Jason Weaver)

==== T.J. Henderson ====
The lead character (played by Tahj Mowry), T.J. Henderson (whose full first and middle name were not revealed) is the youngest child in his family, portrayed as 10 to 11 years old in seasons 1 and 2, and 12 in season 3. As the show's title suggests, T.J. exhibits exceptional intelligence with an IQ of 180, knows several different languages and has a photographic memory. He skips six grades from 4th to 10th grade due to his intelligence, after his teachers at his old school discovered that T.J. was not feeling challenged enough by a 4th grade curriculum. Outside of the occasional moments of awkwardness that are bound to occur when a child interacts with high schoolers, T.J. has a peaceable existence in the school, and is eager to be involved in school functions: so much so, that he becomes the mascot for his school basketball team ("Pugnacious Pete, the Powerful Piedmont Penguin"), with mixed results.

T.J. is later promoted to being the equipment manager for the Piedmont High Penguins basketball team. He spends a fair amount of time at school with his older brother, Marcus, and his brother's best friend, Mo Tibbs. Although they have some tense moments, the two brothers, who share a bedroom throughout the series, care for each other deeply. Though T.J. spends much of his time around teenagers, he is occasionally seen spending time with children his own age, which occasionally results in his attempts to try to fit in with them in situations where he feels out of place. T.J. plays keyboard for Marcus' band Mackadocious in several episodes, after one of the group's other members breaks his finger in an accident (he also briefly served as the band's manager in the season three episode "Achy Breaky Heart").

==== Marcus Henderson ====
Played by Jason Weaver, the character of Marcus Henderson is T.J.'s older brother and the second-oldest child in the Henderson family (behind sister Yvette). He is a fairly popular student at Piedmont High and reacts remarkably well to his younger brother sharing nearly every one of his classes, although tensions do arise from time to time (this is especially true in the pilot episode, to the point where he tells T.J. that he wishes that his younger brother would disappear from his life). He gets average or below average grades, simply because he does not apply himself. He is a forward on his school's basketball team and has several love interests throughout the run of the show, none of which are seen for more than one episode. He is also the lead vocalist for the band which he created, Mackadocious, in which his best friend Mo is the bassist and T.J. is the keyboardist.

==== Tasha Yvette Henderson ====
Played by Essence Atkins, the character of Tasha Yvette Henderson – who is generally referred to by her middle name – is the older sister of Marcus and T.J. and the only daughter of Floyd Henderson. She is in the eleventh grade in season one and graduates high school at the end of season three. Yvette is intelligent, is usually level-headed, is a women's rights activist and has a passion for art, including drama, photography and dancing. She is also the editor of the school newspaper, The Penguin (a position that is the partial basis of "Stop the Presses", in which T.J. decides to start his own newspaper – The Weekly Veritas, which he abruptly switches from a hard news to a tabloid publication upon the advice of Marcus and Mo due to flagging sales – after he becomes dissatisfied with repeatedly assigned by Yvette to write puff pieces). Yvette sometimes finds it hard being the only girl in a family full of mostly men, as seen in the season two episode "Men Working Badly".

Episodes in which her character dates a fellow Piedmont High student feature Yvette sometimes overthinking the relationship, such as when she dated a dimwitted swimmer whom she had mainly a physical attraction to in the episode "Big Picture" or when high school senior Yvette dated a sophomore in the episode "T.A. or Not T.A." In the season one episode "The Code", it is revealed that she has a fake I.D. that says she is 28 years old. After being rejected from Princeton University, Yvette planned to stay in Washington, D.C. to attend Georgetown University as the series ends. Although the character of Yvette is in her late teens, Essence Atkins (born on February 7, 1972, and therefore being in her mid-20s during the run of the series) is actually only ten years younger than John Marshall Jones, who plays her character's father Floyd.

==== Floyd Henderson ====
Played by John Marshall Jones, the character of Floyd Henderson is the strict widowed father of Yvette, Marcus, and T.J. He is a self-made businessman and owns a roofing company called Floyd Henderson Contracting. After the loss of his wife Christina, he would eventually start dating once again: such as in season two's "Dateline", when T.J. sets Floyd up with a woman named Jamie (Jackie Mari Roberts) through an online dating service, whom T.J. eventually gets jealous of after Floyd spends less time with him; and in the season three episode "Beating is Fundamental", when he dates a woman whose son T.J. dislikes (and later punches), though many of the women that he is seen dating in the series are usually not seen for more than one episode. He is frequently a Straight man or comic foil to most of the main characters, including T.J. He also gives good moral advice to all of his children (and sometimes even to Mo).

==== Morris L. "Mo" Tibbs ====
Played by Omar Gooding, the character of Mo Tibbs is Marcus's best friend. He is typically portrayed in the show as being dimwitted (such as confusing a rasher with a haberdasher) with some signs of gullibility, to the point where in the episode "I Was a Teenage Sports Wife", T.J. makes Mo part of a placebo experiment by giving him sugar-filled pill capsules that T.J. claims will stimulate synapses in the brain (therefore increasing intelligence), in order to better perform on tests, only for Mo to inform other students about the pills and drowning T.J. with offers for the "brain pills". Despite his heavy and muscular build, Mo is usually depicted as a friendly person (the pilot episode, however, depicts him as being almost a rival to Marcus in a few scenes, particularly one in which he gets into a fight with Marcus over their classmate Mariah (Venus DeMilo Thomas), whom they both are romantically interested in, resulting in T.J. stepping into the altercation to defend Marcus). Mo is discovered to be an excellent chef, due to the tutelage of Yvette (who helped him learn how to cook after Mo signed up for a cooking class on the spur of the moment, simply because the class was cooking bacon at the time), he plays bass guitar in Marcus' band Mackadocious, and is also a semi-talented barber.

Floyd is often annoyed with Mo's antics, such as his constantly eating from their fridge and even once having slept in T.J.'s bed (having done so as part of a plan to help T.J. sneak out to see a friend at an arcade after being reprimanded and effectively, grounded by Floyd over his choice of clothing). Despite this, Floyd seems to genuinely care about Mo and, as seen in the episode "Diary of a Mad Schoolgirl", shares with him a passion for a barbecue. Mo all but lives at the Henderson's house and dislikes eating at his own house (having once chipped a tooth while eating oatmeal cooked by his mother, as he notes in the opening scene of "Get a Job"). In the season three episode "That's My Momma", Mo accidentally overhears a conversation between his parents Delroy and Verla Mae that they had adopted him as a baby, this leads him to have a falling out with his parents and Marcus and T.J. helping him find his birth mother who is revealed to be a fortune teller in Delaware named Shelia Ecks. A recurring catchphrase of his throughout the series is, "Hello der!" ("hello there").

=== Recurring ===
- Nina Walsh – Played by Tinsley Grimes, Nina is one of Yvette's friends and is seen with her most of the time, however she is only seen during the third season (Yvette had a revolving door of friends up through that point). She works at the store in the mall, where in the episode "Get A Job", she was forced to follow black people because her boss Ms. Hendra explained that African-Americans who were in the store would steal. She is deep and poetic and drools over handsome men.
- Deion Lamont White – Played by Arvie Lowe, Jr., Deion is a teenager who attends Piedmont High. His usual hijinks include taking pictures of Marcus and Mo and selling them to a company for profit (in the season two episode "My Two Dads"), and scamming Marcus and Mo into selling health bars in a pyramid scheme which he involves every other student in school to sell them as well (in the season two episode "Goodbye, Mr. Chimps"), among other things (Marcus refers to him as "a little shrimp"). In the season two episode "The Dating Game", Deion had a crush (more like an obsession) on Yvette and asked her out to the school dance, which Yvette rejects repeatedly (and prompts her to go with T.J.'s plan to make Deion think that she is dating Mo).
- Mackey Nagle – Played by J.D. Walsh, Mackey is a student who is in Marcus and Mo's grade. He is fairly popular and is definitely not the sharpest knife in the drawer. He tries to fit in at school by buying new clothes and speaking slang, but most of the time makes a fool of himself and ends with a comment stating "It's because I'm white, isn't it?" (which is usually replied with nods by everyone who was listening, this particular gag was only seen in the season two episode "Sit In (a.k.a. Dawgburger Rebellion)"). In the season three episode "Perchance to Dream", he has a dream about Yvette kissing him as she tells him about her dreams about Mo. He often wears flannel shirts. He actually ends up streaking during the graduation ceremony in the season three episode "The Graduate?" (after T.J.'s plan of a revenge prank on the Seniors backfires). Originally he was depicted as a bully who harassed T.J. and then Clark.
- Basil Militich – Played by James K. Ward, he is the vice principal of the school. He is cheap when it comes to school necessities, For some reasons, he is presented as incompetent.
- Coach Gerber – Played by Dann Florek, he is the gym teacher and basketball coach at the school. He is bald and aging and went through a divorce (which includes paying $800 in alimony to his wife monthly). He once taught math and gets angry easily. He sleeps in his office since he cannot afford a home of his own. He once mentioned that he has prostate issues (citation?)
- Brandi Andréa Dixon – Played by Kyla Pratt, Brandi is a girl around T.J.'s age, and met T.J. at the arcade in the season two episode "Bad Boy". She is very good at basketball and joined the team T.J. plays on in the season three episode "She Got Game", but she stopped playing due to T.J. being upset with her when she begins starting and T.J. is benched. She wears "ghetto fabulous" clothing and depicts a youthful exaggerated stereotype. They have crushes on each other, but it is not focused on. Brandi only appears in two episodes: "Bad Boy" in season two, and "She Got Game" in season three (though Pratt previously appeared in season one as Lillie, one of T.J.'s three prom dates in the episode "Baby, It's You and You and You").

== Production ==
Tahj Mowry and Omar Gooding are the only main cast members that did not appear in every episode. Tahj Mowry did not appear in the season 3 episode "Get a Job" and Omar Gooding in "A Little Knowledge." Jason Weaver, Essence Atkins and John Marshall Jones are the only cast members to appear in every episode.

The series was taped at Sunset-Gower Studios in Hollywood. The establishing shot of the fictional Piedmont High School later appeared on another Washington, D.C.–based Disney series, Cory in the House for the Disney Channel, and also as the establishing shot for John Adams High on the ABC series Boy Meets World.

=== Main settings ===
==== The Henderson house ====
A majority of the show's scenes take place in the Henderson house or the school. Originally, most of the family scenes took place in the kitchen, with the lack of living room area seen during the first season. The living room set when it was added in season two had a window and the front door at stage center, and the stairs and kitchen doorway at stage right. The kitchen set was scaled back as well with the back stairs that lead to the bedrooms removed. The layout changed again in season three with the kitchen remaining the same, but the living room layout changes including the front door now located at stage left. Marcus and T.J.'s bedroom is the only set to remain the same during the course of the entire series.

==== Piedmont High School ====
Piedmont High is the high school that Yvette, Marcus, Mo and T.J. attend. The four main sets seen in the show are the classroom, the hallway, the cafeteria and the auditorium. The hallway changes its layout twice during the series.

=== Theme song and opening sequences ===
The theme song for the first and second seasons was produced and written by Kristian Rex who also composed the music for the entire second season. The theme song for Smart Guys' third and final one was performed by Hami and featured cast member Omar Gooding. A short version of the season three theme, which is different from the regular theme song was used in episodes in which ran over the allotted time.

The opening sequence for the first two seasons was fully computer-animated with the exception of the cast video headshots. The show's title logo was shown at the beginning and again at the end of the sequence when the main characters without Mo are shown above it. The season three opening titles were made to resemble a music video (the sequence was choreographed by Russell Clark).

=== Video on demand ===
The entire series, except for the episode "Don't Do That Thing You Do" (due to music licensing issues), is available to stream on Disney+ as of its launch date of November 12, 2019.

== Syndication ==
After the end of its running on The WB, the series was rerun on Disney Channel from 1999 to 2004. It was also shown on other networks such as BET, ABC Family, Up TV, and MTV2. In other countries, it is also shown on the international versions of Disney Channel. In Canada, the show ran on Family Channel from 2002 to 2008.

== Awards and nominations ==
Year	Award	Category	Recipient	Result
1998	BAFTA	Kids' Vote		Won
1998	YoungStar Awards	Best Performance by a Young Actor in a Comedy TV Series	Tahj Mowry	Nominated
1998	Young Artist Awards	Best Performance in a TV Comedy Series – Leading Young Performer	Tahj Mowry	Nominated
1999	Young Artist Awards	Best Family TV Comedy Series		Nominated
1999	NAACP Image Awards	Outstanding Youth Actor/Actress	Tahj Mowry	Nominated
2000	American Cinema Foundation	Television Series – Comedy		Nominated
2000	Humanitas Prize	30 Minute Category	Steve Young; For episode "Never Too Young"	Nominated
2000	NAACP Image Awards	Outstanding Youth Actor/Actress	Tahj Mowry	Nominated
