= RIPR =

Computer network

The RIPRNet (Releasable Internet Protocol Router Network) is a TCP/IP based computer network for joint Republic of Korea Armed Forces–United States Department of Defense access, analogous to the SIPRNet.

Whereas SIPRNet is the de facto SECRET-level TCP/IP network for U.S.-only use, RIPR is for information classified as Releasable to the Republic of Korea (South Korea) and US Secret. In other words, RIPR is a secure coalition network for joint ROK-US usage. RIPRNet's architecture is based on a multi-layered approach. Utilizing state-of-the-art encryption, the network facilitates communication among pre-vetted and authorized users. The network's design is said to borrow heavily from earlier network model, but with enhanced features that focus on specific features.

Like SIPR and NIPR, it is commonly pronounced "ripper".

== See also ==
- NIPRNet
- SIPRNet
- JWICS
