= John A. Ferraro =

American actor and director (1946 - 2010)

John A. Ferraro (April 5, 1946 – December 7, 2010) was an American actor, academic, stage director and television director. His credits as a director included Sesame Street, as well as Broadway and off-Broadway plays.

Ferraro was born in Paterson, New Jersey, on April 5, 1946 and raised in Wayne, New Jersey, where he attended Wayne Valley High School. Ferraro received a bachelor's degree in fine arts from New York University. He had been a resident of North Haledon, New Jersey.

Ferraro joined the theater group, Manhattan Project, following his graduation from New York University. He appeared in numerous productions with the group, including roles in the New York Shakespeare Festival, as well as the theatrical production of Our Late Night.

Ferraro also embarked in a career in stage and television direction. His off Broadway credits included Saved From Obscurity in 1988. Ferraro worked as an associate director of the Broadway production of The Pirates of Penzance in the 1980s and directed Crazy He Calls Me in 1992. Ferraro's television direction credits included episodes of the PBS children's shows, Shining Time Station and Sesame Street. He also directed television episodes of The WB Television Network's Smart Guy, Comedy Central's The Higgins Boys and Gruber and HBO's off-Broadway production of Reno: In Rage and Rehab.

Ferraro joined the faculty of the USC School of Cinematic Arts in 2003.

Ferraro died on December 7, 2010, of colon cancer at USC University Hospital in Los Angeles at the age of 64. He was survived by his wife, Karen Emounts and his son Gregory Ferraro
