= OpenNet (website) =

- Website type: News and forum
- Available in: Russian
- Creator: Maxim Chirkov
- Revenue: Advertisement
- Website: www.opennet.ru
- Commercial: No
- Registration: Optional
- Launched: 1996
- Current status: Active

OpenNet is a Russian news site about free and open source software. It was created in 1996 by Maxim Chirkov. The site also hosts translated man-pages, a forum, a wiki and several FOSS projects that are considered 'interesting'. The site's traffic is estimated at 500,000 visitors per month making it the second most popular Russian site about FOSS after linux.org.ru. In 2001, the site has been the winner of a Golden Site award.
