= Arvie Lowe Jr. =

American actor (born 1978)

- Born: February 3, 1978 (age 47); Los Angeles, California, U.S.
- Occupation: Actor
- Years active: 1992–present

Arvie Lowe Jr. (born February 3, 1978) is an American actor. He is best known for his role as Boots in the 1992 film Newsies.

== Career ==
Lowe's other acting credits include City Guys, Moesha, Sister, Sister, Smart Guy, Jessie and Thea. Lowe also had a recurring role on Lizzie McGuire as Mr. Dig. He was also featured in the films Bebe's Kids (1992), The Adventures of Rocky and Bullwinkle (2000) and Trippin' (1999).

== Filmography ==
=== Film ===
Year	Title	Role	Notes
1992	Newsies	Boots	
1992	Bebe's Kids	Additional voices	
1994	I'll Do Anything	Rainbow House Child	
1999	Trippin'	Male Student	
2000	The Adventures of Rocky and Bullwinkle	Sharp-Eyed Student	
2001	Shot	Boo	

=== Television ===
Year	Title	Role	Notes
1993	Tall Hopes	Hector	Episode: "Get the Jet"
1993–1994	Thea	Otis	5 episodes
1995–1996	Sister, Sister	Ernie / Arvie / Ice Cube D.J.	10 episodes
1996	Moesha	Ernest	2 episodes
1997–1998	Smart Guy	Deion	6 episodes
2000	City Guys	Maleek	Episode: "Keep on the Download"
2001–2003	Lizzie McGuire	Digby "Mr. Dig" Sellers	12 episodes
2011	Awkward Universe	Dan	Episode: "Cool Video Desertion"
2011	Jessie	J.J. Mayfield	Episode: "One Day Wonders"
