= Danny Kallis =

American television writer and producer

Danny Kallis (born March 13, 1957) is an American television writer and producer. He has written for such programs as The Suite Life of Zack & Cody, The Suite Life on Deck, The JammX Kids, The Sausage Factory, Smart Guy (which he also directed), Who's the Boss?, The Upper Hand, The Charmings, Silver Spoons, Mama's Family and Taxi.

He received a Bachelor of Arts degree from Claremont College. He founded a production company called Danny Kallis Productions which produced Smart Guy and The Suite Life on Deck. He also teaches screenwriting at UCLA extension.

== Producer ==
He produced Arwin! (not picked up by Disney), The Suite Life of Zack & Cody, The Suite Life on Deck, The JammX Kids, The Sausage Factory, Grown Ups, Smart Guy, Hangin' with Mr. Cooper and Phenom.

== Danny Kallis Productions ==
Danny Kallis Productions was created in the 1990s and was the main production company for the WB sitcom Smart Guy. They closed down due to low production output. The company was later re-opened to produce the Disney Channel series The Suite Life on Deck, a spinoff of The Suite Life of Zack & Cody, which he also co-created.
