= NIPRNet =

One of the United States Department of Defense's three main networks

- Part of The United States Department of Defense Computer Networks
- Based in United States

Site information
- Operator: Multiple Operators
- Controlled by: The United States Department of Defense
- Open to the public: No

The Non-classified Internet Protocol (IP) Router Network (NIPRNet) is an IP network used to exchange unclassified information, including information subject to controls on distribution, among the private network's users. The NIPRNet also provides its users access to the Internet.

It is one of the United States Department of Defense's three main networks. The others include SIPRNet and JWICS.

== History ==
NIPRNet is composed of Internet Protocol routers owned by the United States Department of Defense (DOD). It was created in the 1980s and managed by the Defense Information Systems Agency (DISA) to supersede the earlier MILNET.

=== Security improvements ===
In the year leading up to 2010 NIPRNet has grown faster than the U.S. Department of Defense can monitor. DoD spent $10 million in 2010 to map out the current state of the NIPRNet, in an effort to analyze its expansion, and identify unauthorized users, who are suspected to have quietly joined the network. The NIPRNet survey, which uses IPSonar software developed by Lumeta Corporation, also looked for weaknesses in security caused by network configuration. The Department of Defense has made a major effort in the year leading up to 2010, to improve network security. The Pentagon announced it was requesting $2.3 billion in the 2012 budget to bolster network security within the Defense Department and to strengthen ties with its counterparts at the Department of Homeland Security.

== Alternative names ==
SIPRNet and NIPRNet are referred to colloquially as SIPPERnet and NIPPERnet (or simply sipper and nipper), respectively.

== See also ==
- Classified website
- SIPRNet
- RIPR
- Joint Worldwide Intelligence Communications System (JWICS)
- Intellipedia
- Protective distribution system
- NATO CRONOS
