= SIPRNet =

Computer network used by the United States Government

- Part of The United States Department of Defense Computer Networks
- Based in United States

Site information
- Operator: Multiple Operators
- Controlled by: The United States Department of Defense
- Open to the public: No

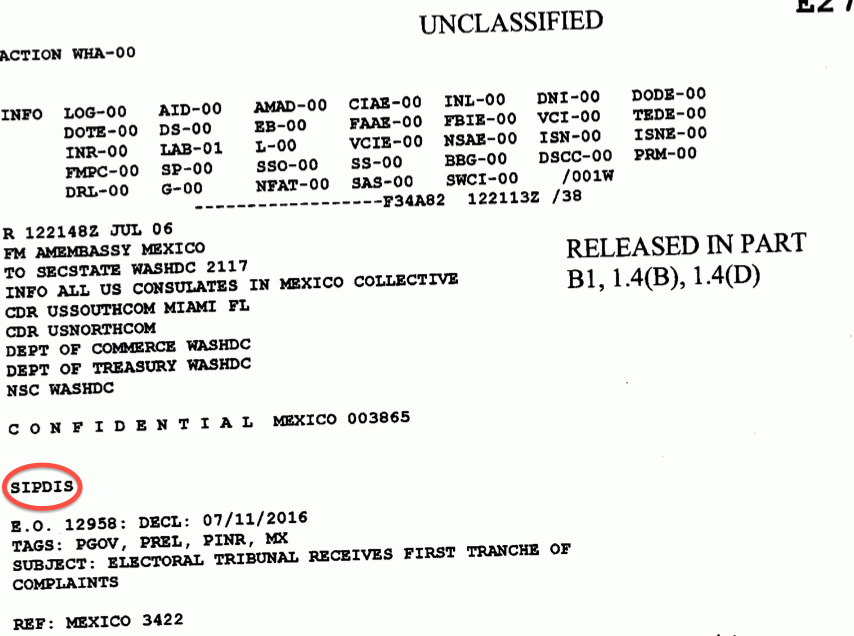
Header of an unclassified Department of State telegram with the "SIPDIS" tag marked in red

The Secret Internet Protocol Router Network (SIPRNet) is "a system of interconnected computer networks used by the U.S. Department of Defense and the U.S. Department of State to transmit classified information (up to and including secret information) by packet switching over the 'completely secure' environment". It also provides services such as hypertext document access and electronic mail.

SIPRNet is a component of the Defense Information Systems Network. Other components handle communications with other security needs, such as the NIPRNet, which is used for nonsecure communications, and the Joint Worldwide Intelligence Communications System (JWICS), which is used for Top Secret communications.

== Access ==
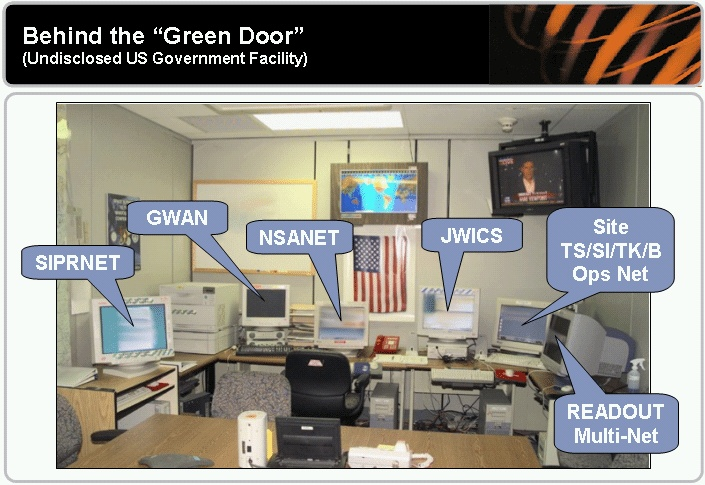
Behind the Green Door secure communications center with SIPRNET, GWAN, NSANET, and JWICS access

According to the U.S. Department of State Web Development Handbook, domain structure and naming conventions are the same as for the open internet, except for the addition of a second-level domain, like, e.g., "sgov" between state and gov: openforum.state.sgov.gov. Files originating from SIPRNet are marked by a header tag "SIPDIS" (SIPRNet DIStribution). A corresponding second-level domain smil.mil exists for DoD users.

Access is also available to a "...small pool of trusted allies, including Australia, Canada, the United Kingdom and New Zealand...". This group (including the US) is known as the Five Eyes.

SIPRNet was one of the networks accessed by Chelsea Manning, convicted of leaking the video used in WikiLeaks' "Collateral Murder" release as well as the source of the US diplomatic cables published by WikiLeaks in November 2010.

== Alternate names ==
SIPRNet and NIPRNet are referred to colloquially as SIPPERnet and NIPPERnet (or simply sipper and nipper), respectively.

== See also ==
- CAVNET
- Classified website
- NIPRNet
- RIPR
- Intellipedia
- Protective distribution system
- NATO CRONOS
