= List of The Suite Life on Deck episodes =

The Suite Life on Deck is a Disney Channel original series, which aired for three seasons on Disney Channel from September 26, 2008, to May 6, 2011.

== Series overview ==
Season	Episodes	Originally released	
Season	Episodes	First released	Last released
1	21	September 26, 2008	July 17, 2009
2	28	August 7, 2009	June 18, 2010
3	22	July 2, 2010	May 6, 2011
Film		March 25, 2011	

== Episodes ==
=== Season 1 (2008–09) ===
No. overall	No. in season	Title	Directed by	Written by	Original release date	Prod. code	U.S. viewers (millions)
1	1	"The Suite Life Sets Sail"	Jim Drake	Danny Kallis & Pamela Eells O'Connell	September 26, 2008	101	5.7
Continuing from the series finale of the previous show, Zack (Dylan Sprouse), Cody (Cole Sprouse), London (Brenda Song), and Mr. Moseby (Phill Lewis) from The Suite Life of Zack & Cody set sail on the SS Tipton for their semester at sea. London uses jewelry to bribe her cabin-mate, Padma, to leave the ship so she can have a cabin to herself. Cody finds himself sharing a cabin with Woody, who is very messy. Zack shares a cabin with Bailey (Debby Ryan), who is a neat freak. Unbeknownst to anyone, Bailey is a girl who disguised herself as a boy in order to gain a position on the ship after she found out that there were no more vacancies for girls. Zack and Cody agree to switch cabin-mates, but Zack changes his mind after he finds out that Bailey is a girl. After everyone else eventually finds this out, Bailey is allowed to stay, filling the position vacated by London's ex-cabin-mate, and Bailey becomes London's new cabin-mate. This is the last straw for London and she escapes to Parrot Island via helicopter. Special guest star: Kim Rhodes as Carey Martin Guest stars: Erin Cardillo as Emma Tutweiller, Tiya Sircar as Padma, Matthew Timmons as Woody Fink
2	2	"Parrot Island"	Rich Correll	Danny Kallis & Pamela Eells O'Connell	September 27, 2008	107	5.1
Following the events of the first episode, when the SS Tipton makes a special trip to pick up London from Parrot Island, Bailey, Moseby, and Woody end up in the island's jail because all of the parrots left for Seal Island after Tipton Industries cut down all the trees. Zack and Cody attempt to get them released from jail, but the twins are incarcerated along with the others and Bailey has to use her pig, Porkers, to rescue them. Zack and Cody fight over Bailey, but Zack lets Cody have her after finding out about her ex-boyfriend Moose and seeing she has too much "baggage," while Zack wants a girl who is just a "carry on." Eventually London comes back on board and the trees are now replanted on Parrot Island. Guest stars: Lillian Adams as Mrs. Pepperman, Erin Cardillo as Emma Tutweiller, Stuart Pankin as Simms, Matthew Timmons as Woody Fink
3	3	"Broke 'N' Yo-Yo"	Jim Drake	Jeny Quine & Adam Lapidus	October 3, 2008	102	4.0
Bailey is mad that London is hogging all the space in their cabin, so she decides to trick her with the myth of the "Sea Snark." She later feels guilty and tells her the truth. Meanwhile, when Zack uses up both his and Cody's meal cards buying expensive things for all of the girls on the ship, they run out of money. Moseby puts them to work so they can earn their keep. Cody is practicing for a yo-yo contest to make some money and impress Bailey and Zack agrees to take over both his and Cody's jobs on the ship so Cody can perfect his yo-yo trick. To keep up with both jobs, Zack uses a towel thrower to get the towels to the passengers. Cody finds himself up against a young yo-yo champion named Johan Yo. Johan wins the yo-yo competition, but after Bailey tells Cody that Johan is a professional, he is disqualified because the competition was for amateurs only, and Cody is declared the winner. Despite winning, Zack and Cody do not keep the money. Instead, Moseby keeps the money to pay for the damage done by Zack's thrower. Guest stars: Grant Johnson as Johan Yo, Kara Crane as Piper
4	4	"The Kidney of the Sea"	Ellen Gittelsohn	Jeff Hodsden & Tim Pollock	October 10, 2008	103	TBA
Zack develops a crush on a cute passenger named Violet, but must deal with her wealthy "boyfriend", Ashton, and snooty mother who will do anything to keep Zack and Violet apart, especially after Ashton gives her an expensive jewelry piece. Meanwhile, Cody referees an intelligence test between London's dog, Ivana, and Bailey's pet pig, Porkers. Bailey tries to take advantage of Cody's crush on her, while London tries to bribe Cody. At the end, the competition ends in a draw. Ashton accuses Zack of stealing the "Kidney of the Sea" necklace. London's dog, Ivana, proves Ashton wrong. Ashton had hidden the jewel in his pocket and then he admits the truth in a grudging tone. At the end, Violet throws the Kidney of the Sea into the ocean as London watches, throwing away her month-old jewelry. Guest stars: Christa B. Allen as Violet, Shannon Holt as Mrs. Berg, Aaron Perilo as Ashton Note: The episode is a parody of the 1997 film Titanic.
5	5	"Showgirls" "Show & Tell"	Shelley Jensen	Howard Nemetz & Dan Signer	October 17, 2008	104	3.7
London and Bailey are on a mission to prove that Miss Tutweiller is dating Mr. Moseby after overhearing a conversation between the two. Meanwhile, Zack convinces Cody to sneak out after curfew to catch the Starlight Follies burlesque show on the ship. When they finally make it past the security guard and into the show, they become convinced that their teacher, Miss Tutweiller, is one of the showgirls after seeing her heart shaped anklet in the show and during class. So, Zack sends Bailey and London undercover as two showgirls to find out. But eventually thanks to Woody ratting them out (after getting his grade raised to a "D+"), Zack, Cody, London and Bailey get caught sneaking into the Starlight Follies on a school night and get detention. However, at the end when the kids are out of earshot, it is revealed that Miss Tutweiller was the showgirl because she was filling in for someone. Guest stars: Erin Cardillo as Emma Tutweiller, Matthew Timmons as Woody Fink, Windell D. Middlebrooks as Kirby Note: This episode is listed on various media sources under both titles.
6	6	"International Dateline"	Ellen Gittelsohn	Jeny Quine & Dan Signer	October 24, 2008	105	3.8
In a similar fashion to Groundhog Day, Cody tries to impress Bailey at their school dance, but he fails and finds himself stuck in a time loop while everyone is oblivious to what is happening. Cody believes the time loop is caused by fate giving him another chance with Bailey, but eventually realizes that lightning striking the ship as it crossed the International Date Line was what caused the time reversal, so he reduces the ship's speed to break the time loop. In the end, he still fails to impress Bailey but Zack helps him out. Guest stars: Lillian Adams as Mrs. Pepperman, Erin Cardillo as Emma Tutweiller, Matthew Timmons as Woody Fink, Steve Monroe as Haggis, Chad Duell as Holden, Rachael Bell as Addison Absent: Phill Lewis as Mr. Moseby
7	7	"It's All Greek to Me"	Shelley Jensen	Jim Geoghan	November 7, 2008	106	N/A
The SS Tipton visits Greece. While they are there, Bailey crushes on the handsome young tour guide, which makes Cody jealous. To impress her, Arwin's cousin, Milos, gives him a replica of the ancient amulet of the Greek goddess Aphrodite to give as a gift to her, but in a mix up, he ends up getting the real one. Meanwhile, London has to write a speech for her father, who is funding a new exhibit, but finds it very difficult, but then has a dream about Greek history, which inspires her. On the opening day of the exhibit, Zack, Cody, and Bailey, disguised as statues, attempt to switch the fake for the real one. However, when Milos fails to keep lookout, the curator Elias sees them in the act and threatens to get them arrested. When Milos explains it was his fault, Elias fires him. When Zack explains Milos's connection to Arwin to London, London tells Elias that if he fires Milos, she would tell her father not to fund the exhibit. Milos is then promoted, and everything is resolved. During the credits, Milos and Arwin have a video chat, where they call out each other for lying, Milos calling out Arwin for not being married, and Arwin calling out Milos for owing him money. Guest stars: Adam Bay as Adonis, Erin Cardillo as Emma Tutweiller, John Kapelos as Elias, Brian Stepanek as Milos/Arwin
8	8	"Sea Monster Mash"	Rich Correll	Adam Lapidus	November 14, 2008	108	4.4
The class has a school project to complete and Cody chooses Bailey to be his partner, disappointing Zack who had hoped to get Cody to complete his and Woody's project for them. After Bailey tells London that she has partnered with Cody, London teams up with Zack and Woody. Cody is trying to catch a famous sea monster, but keeps failing and disappointing Bailey. Zack tries to sabotage Cody's project. However, his own project turns into a monster when London pours a smoothie into their plant project, causing it to grow and eventually trapping Zack, Woody, and London. The sea monster shows up at the end of the episode. Guest star: Matthew Timmons as Woody Fink
9	9	"Flowers and Chocolate"	Rich Correll	Tim Pollock	November 21, 2008	109	4.07
Chelsea, Barbara, and Bob visit the SS Tipton. Cody is worried about how he's going to tell Barbara about his feelings for Bailey, but Barbara has to dump Cody because she and Bob are now dating. Right before Cody tells her about Bailey, Barbara tells him about her and Bob. To make Barbara jealous, Cody tells her that he and Bailey are also dating, thinking he can get away with the lie because Bailey is off the ship, only for her to return early. London tells Chelsea that her cabin is her shoe closet, and that Woody is her servant. Woody agrees to help her because he has a crush on Chelsea. During movie night, Cody tries to make Barbara think that he and Bailey are dating, but Bailey eventually finds out. Cody apologizes and Bailey forgives him and says if he wanted her to be his pretend girlfriend, all he had to do is ask. To show it, she tickles him, wraps her arms around him, and finishes with a kiss on the cheek (causing Cody to faint) saying that would have made Barbara really jealous. Chelsea finds out that London is just a regular student, but instead of telling everyone, tells London she will tell everyone that London was "abducted by aliens" instead. Bob also apologizes to Zack for never getting to spend any time with him. Guest stars: Brittany Curran as Chelsea Brimmer, Sophie Oda as Barbara Brownstein, Jennifer Tisdale as Activities Coordinator Connie, Charlie Stewart as Bob, Matthew Timmons as Woody Fink Note: London's plot is similar to the Yay Me episode, "London in London," in which London and Chelsea meet and London tells her that Bailey is her shoe closet maid. Absent: Phill Lewis as Mr. Moseby
10	10	"Boo You"	Phill Lewis	Jeff Hodsden	December 5, 2008	110	4.3
When Cody and Kirby do not allow Zack to bungee-jump off the side of the ship, the brothers accidentally knock Kirby off the ship, but Kirby, who is by then attached to the bungee cord, gets pulled back and, after a short flight, lands in the hot tub. To make it up to him, Zack and Cody tutor Kirby so he can pass his high school equivalency exam and earn a promotion. Meanwhile, London embarrasses Bailey multiple times on her internet show in a new segment called "Boo You!" When Bailey's crush Holden asks her out on a date, she thinks London set her up and eventually embarrasses herself. It turns out that London set Holden and Bailey up on a date to apologize for embarrassing Bailey. Guest stars: Erin Cardillo as Emma Tutweiller, Windell D. Middlebrooks as Kirby, Chad Duell as Holden, Matthew Timmons as Woody Fink Note: London first mentioned her "Boo You" frown right before her 24-hour Yay Me broadcast in "Let Us Entertain You", a season 3 episode of The Suite Life of Zack & Cody. Absent: Phill Lewis as Mr. Moseby
11	11	"seaHarmony"	Lex Passaris	Billy Riback	December 12, 2008	111	4.2
Zack and London play matchmaker for Mr. Moseby and Ms. Tutweiller, but with little success. Eventually, they get Moseby and Tutweiller together, and although they have an argument, they remain together. Meanwhile, Cody tries to impress Bailey by acting like someone else based on her dating test results. However, what Cody does not know is that some of her answers were for fun, while the others were true. Guest star: Erin Cardillo as Emma Tutweiller Title Reference: An online match maker, eHarmony.
12	12	"The Mommy and the Swami"	Lex Passaris	Dan Signer & Jeny Quine	January 9, 2009	115	N/A
When the ship stops in India, Cody takes Zack with him to visit his guru, a Swami who lives in the top of a mountain who charges high prices for everything he sells. Eventually, Zack and Cody run out of money and join the Swami's worldwide call center. Meanwhile, Mr. Moseby is having computer problems and is trying to contact the call center for help, but without any success. Padma, who was originally London's cabin-mate on the ship, but left after London bribed her, asks London to help convince her mother that she was still at sea. It is later shown that the help center Moseby was calling was run by the Swami, who used an American accent. Guest stars: Rizwan Manji as the Swami, Tiya Sircar as Padma, Sarah Ripard as Gitanjali/Buffy Absent: Debby Ryan as Bailey Pickett
13	13	"Maddie on Deck"	Rich Correll	Jeff Hodsden & Tim Pollock	January 16, 2009	112	4.1
When the ship stops in Liechtenstamp, Maddie Fitzpatrick visits the SS Tipton and gains a new friend: Bailey. Prince Jeffy of Liechtenstamp, who is only 8 years old, falls in love with Maddie and forces her to marry him. However, Zack challenges the Prince to a joust, with Maddie being the prize. Zack begins to lose until he is kissed by Maddie. Special guest star: Ashley Tisdale as Maddie Fitzpatrick Guest stars: Uriah Shelton as Prince Jeffy, Cale Hoelzman as Prince Timmy, Scott Dreier as Harold The Herald Note: This is the 100th episode of the Suite Life series, and also the first and only appearance of Maddie Fitzpatrick in the show The Suite Life on Deck as well as her last appearance in the Suite Life franchise.
14	14	"When in Rome..."	Rich Correll	Jeff Hodsden & Tim Pollock	January 23, 2009	113	3.71
The ship docks in Rome, Italy and London falls for a handsome musician named Luca while he performs in the streets. Later, as Bailey searches for her money belt key, she overhears that Luca and his uncle, Marco, are actually con men and had already conned London for $20,000. Bailey talks to Luca and finds out that he actually doesn't want to be a con man and really likes London. So, they hatch a plan to get the money back from his uncle that involves Bailey dressing up as Naomi Wyoming, a parody of Hannah Montana. Meanwhile, Zack and Cody get themselves hired by Chef Gigi so they can eat at her restaurant. At the end, Cody is fired, but Zack enjoys a delicious meal with Gigi. Guest stars: Jacopo Sarno as Luca, Joe Nipote as Marco, Sandra Purpuro as Gigi Note: The song that Luca performs is the Italian version of "Could You Be the One?" from Disney Channel's short series As the Bell Rings.
15	15	"Shipnotized"	Shelley Jensen	Jim Geoghan	January 30, 2009	114	4.0
A famous hypnotist visits the SS Tipton and accidentally hypnotizes London to act like Bailey, which gets her really annoyed. Meanwhile, Harvard's Dean of Admissions, Monroe Cabot, is also visiting with his daughter Olivia. Cabot is fond of Cody, but thinks lowly of Zack, although Zack wants to date Olivia who shares feelings for Zack as well. Since Cabot does not approve of the relationship, Zack and Cody concoct a plan where Cody will pretend to go out on a date with Olivia, which Cabot approves of, but Zack will actually be the one who goes on the date. After another mishap with the hypnotist where Olivia is hypnotized to act like her "true self", Cabot finds out about the switch and chastises Cody, telling him he will never get into Harvard, bringing Cody to tears. Zack sticks up for his brother, telling Cabot that Harvard would be lucky to have Cody as a student, bringing up many of Cody's accomplishments. Cody, having regained his confidence, rejects his dream of going to Harvard, telling Cabot that he would prefer to go to Yale instead. Guest stars: Gilland Jones as Olivia, Hamilton Mitchell as Cabot, Alec Ledd as Enzo Biscotti Absent: Phill Lewis as Mr. Moseby
16	16	"Mom and Dad on Deck"	Ellen Gittelsohn	Danny Kallis & Jim Geoghan	February 20, 2009	117	5.3
Zack and Cody plan to have an all-guys weekend with their father, but a surprise visit from their mother ruins their plans. When Kurt and Carey get a show on the ship, Mr. Moseby says they can stay on board permanently if it is a success. Worried their parents will stay on the ship, the twins hatch a plan to sabotage their parents' show. Meanwhile, London tries to find the perfect belated birthday gift for Mr. Moseby by following him around all day. In the end, London makes Mr. Moseby very happy that he got a present from her because even his own mother forgot his birthday. Special guest star: Kim Rhodes as Carey Martin Guest star: Robert Torti as Kurt Martin Note: Zack and Cody's father's name is Kurt Martin, but the credits at the end of the show address him as Rick Martin. Absent: Debby Ryan as Bailey Pickett
17	17	"The Wrong Stuff"	Ellen Gittelsohn	Jeny Quine & Adam Lapidus	March 27, 2009	118	3.4
London holds a competition between Cody and Woody to decide which one of them will accompany her on her trip to the Tipton Space Station. Desperate to win, Cody and Woody each try to sabotage the other during the competition. Meanwhile, Zack is in charge of the senior citizen's activities and meets a passenger who is unwilling to participate in any of the activities. Zack makes multiple attempts to find something he wants to do and finally discovers that he enjoys playing pranks on other people. Together, they try to pull off a series of pranks on the other passengers. Guest stars: Lillian Adams as Mrs. Pepperman, Gavin MacLeod as Barker, Matthew Timmons as Woody Fink Absent: Debby Ryan as Bailey Pickett, Phill Lewis as Mr. Moseby
18	18	"Splash & Trash"	Rich Correll	Pamela Eells O'Connell & Dan Signer	April 17, 2009	119	3.5
Zack and Woody are convinced that a girl the SS Tipton rescued from the ocean is actually a mermaid. They make multiple attempts to prove it, but are unsuccessful. Upon her telling Zack that she is really a competitive swimmer and extremely busy training for the Olympics, Zack decides to teach her how to relax. Meanwhile, Cody is fired as the ship's towel boy after he does not allow passengers to use multiple towels in an attempt to protect the environment. He also puts up a show to portray the future of the Earth if this kind of overuse continues, which ultimately gets him re-hired as towel boy. Guest stars: Allie Gonino as Marissa, Matthew Timmons as Woody Fink Absent: Debby Ryan as Bailey Pickett
19	19	"Mulch Ado About Nothing"	Danny Kallis	Pamela Eells O'Connell	May 1, 2009	116	N/A
When Bailey starts feeling homesick, Cody decides to recreate her hometown festival. However, thanks to London, Bailey's hometown boyfriend, Moose, shows up. He and Cody compete in corn bobbin', arm wrestling, and chess to win Bailey's heart, but Cody loses every competition. Moose asks Bailey to come home, so she asks Cody what to do. Cody says to follow her heart and Bailey stays because she would miss her friends. At the end, Bailey hints that she likes Cody after the pair share a hug. Guest stars: Hutch Dano as Moose, Matthew Timmons as Woody Fink
20	20	"Cruisin' for a Bruisin'"	Lex Passaris	Danny Kallis	June 5, 2009	121	N/A
Zack puts ice cream on Cody's report. Fed up, Cody throws the ice cream to the floor. Moseby slips on the ice cream. Kirby tries to save him, but ends up injuring him. Connie takes over Moseby's work and breaks a boat in a bottle intended as a gift for the captain. Everyone tries to comfort Moseby, but none of them do any good. Moseby overhears mention of a problem with the boat and thinks there is a problem with the full-size ship. London eventually fixes the boat in a bottle. Moseby falls down the stairs and injures everyone except London. Finally, Moseby accidentally breaks the boat and does not have enough time to repair it. Guest stars: Jennifer Tisdale as Connie, Windell D. Middlebrooks as Kirby Absent: Debby Ryan as Bailey Pickett
21	21	"Double-Crossed" (Note: Part 2 of "Wizards on Deck with Hannah Montana")	Rich Correll	Danny Kallis & Pamela Eells O'Connell	July 17, 2009	120	9.3
Hannah Montana boards the SS Tipton on her way to a concert performance in Honolulu, Hawaii. To impress Bailey, Cody desperately tries to get tickets to the show, having claimed he knew Hannah from when she stayed in the Tipton hotel and ate cake off of Zack's shirt. Meanwhile, the Russo's are still aboard the ship on their vacation in which Alex pulls a prank on Justin by putting blue dye in the hot tub, making him turn blue, for which Mr. Moseby blames Zack, while Max tries to impress London with his magical suitcase. In the end, Alex is grounded for pranking Justin, and Mr. Moseby apologizes to Zack for blaming him (Though he is still in trouble, as he admitted to perpetuating other pranks); and Hannah Montana arrives in the lobby and recognizes Cody because of the cake on his shirt, she then gives Bailey and Cody tickets to her concert plus backstage passes, Bailey then tells Cody that "this is going to be the best date ever", and that Cody is "her guy", which ends in Bailey finally kissing Cody on the lips, starting their anticipated relationship. Special guest stars: Jake T. Austin as Max Russo, Miley Cyrus as Miley Stewart/Hannah Montana, Selena Gomez as Alex Russo, David Henrie as Justin Russo, Emily Osment as Lilly Truscott/Lola Luftnagle Guest stars: Matthew Timmons as Woody Fink, Windell D. Middlebrooks as Kirby Notes: This episode is a crossover that features the casts of Wizards of Waverly Place and Hannah Montana coming aboard the SS Tipton. This is the second time Miley Cyrus has worked as Hannah Montana on a Suite Life show. The first time was in the episode for the That's So Raven/The Suite Life of Zack & Cody/Hannah Montana episode called That's So Suite Life of Hannah Montana. This is also the second time Selena Gomez has worked on a Suite Life show. The first time was in The Suite Life of Zack & Cody episode "A Midsummer's Nightmare" when she played a classmate named Gwen.

=== Season 2 (2009–10) ===
No. overall	No. in season	Title	Directed by	Written by	Original release date	Prod. code	U.S. viewers (millions)
22	1	"The Spy Who Shoved Me"	Shelley Jensen	Jim Geoghan	August 7, 2009	205	4.9
A microchip with secret information on it goes missing and the twins help a spy recover it. Cody gives the chip to Bailey, telling her to hide it and not to look at what is in it, but Bailey looks it up on her computer anyway. When Cody finds out that Bailey ignored him, breaking her promise, he has mixed emotions. Bailey kisses Cody on the lips as a way of telling him he can trust her, so he forgives her. Guest stars: Gildart Jackson as James Smith, Sara Erikson as Red Finger Notes: This is the first episode of the series to be broadcast in high-definition, as the show now utilizes a 'filmized' appearance (though it is still shot on videotape, as is standard with Disney Channel sitcoms).
23	2	"Ala-ka-scram!"	Shelley Jensen	Billy Riback	August 14, 2009	206	4.1
London develops a crush on the ship's magician, Armando, and finds herself getting jealous of his assistant Karina. So, she sends Karina away by telling her dad to send her away, but Mr. Tipton instead proposed marriage to her. As a result, London fills in as Armando's assistant, but causes trouble, accidentally hurting Armando and making kids in the audience cry. Meanwhile, Zack tries to hang out with Cody and Bailey, much to their annoyance, so to get him off their back, they invite Woody to hang out with Zack for an upcoming Air Band contest. However, they clash when Woody is not taking the contest seriously. Guest stars: Matthew Timmons as Woody Fink, Savannah Jayde as Tanya, Briana Lane as Karina, Justin Kredible as Armando Notes: The song Zack sings, "Hot December Snow", is a parody of Guns N' Roses' "November Rain", with Zack as Jim Gillette of Nitro and Woody as Slash.
24	3	"In the Line of Duty"	Rich Correll	Jeff Hodsden & Tim Pollock	August 21, 2009	203	4.3
After Zack gets in trouble with Ms. Tutwieller by setting off a stink cloud, she suggests that he becomes the hall monitor, but it soon gets out of hand when he puts all of his classmates in detention. Meanwhile, Cody and Bailey find it increasingly harder to spend time with each other. In addition, Bailey gets a job at London's new boutique, which is actually a secret closet to store the rest of her extensive collection of clothes. London gets punished by her father for converting the ship's store into her personal closet and is now forced to sell merchandise (such as snow globes). Guest stars: Matthew Timmons as Woody Fink, Erin Cardillo as Emma Tutweiller, Marisa Theodore as Cara, Windell D. Middlebrooks as Kirby
25	4	"Kitchen Casanova"	Rich Correll	Jeny Quine & Dan Signer	September 4, 2009	202	3.7
Cody's teacher is chopping onions and cuts herself so Cody fills in for her. But, when he becomes the center of attention, Bailey starts to get jealous and makes a plan with Woody to get him back. Meanwhile, London is selling Zack's paintings' (sneezed food) for $30,000. Then, Zack finds out and tries to sell them on his own, but finds out people only like them because London did. Guest stars: Matthew Timmons as Woody Fink, Rachael Bell as Addison, Jennifer Rhodes as Mrs. McCracken, Leslie-Anne Huff as Reina Absent: Phill Lewis as Mr. Moseby
26	5	"Smarticle Particles"	Rich Correll	Adam Lapidus	September 11, 2009	201	4.0
To win a bet with Cody, Bailey convinces London that a perfume will make her smarter. Meanwhile, Zack asks out the captain of the boys wrestling team, who is a girl, after accidentally dropping freezing cold ocean water on her, that he had meant to drop on Woody. Guest stars: Matthew Timmons as Woody Fink, Staci Pratt as Becky
27	6	"Family Thais"	Rich Correll	Jeff Hodsden & Tim Pollock	September 18, 2009	209	4.5
Bailey and London go to Thailand to meet London's grandmother and discover that she is a poor farmer so London gives her grandmother and her hut a makeover. Meanwhile, Zack asks Cody to be his wingman because he likes a girl, although he wants to be faithful to Bailey. In the end, it is revealed the girl already has a boyfriend, so Zack gets together with her friend instead. Guest stars: Erica Aulds as Sasha, Ashley Farley as Hilary, Elizabeth Sung as Khun Yai Absent: Phill Lewis as Mr. Moseby
28	7	"Goin' Bananas"	Phill Lewis	Jeny Quine & Dan Signer	September 25, 2009	204	4.0
Zack turns in one of Cody's old term papers as his own, without realizing that Cody had inserted a bizarre passage about a fictional banana-phobia, so Mrs. Tutweiller sends him to see a counsellor, ending with Zack taking his anger out on his brother. Meanwhile, London goes through withdrawal when her cellphone is taken away after she is caught texting during class, prompting Bailey to help her find something new to do to keep her hands busy. In addition, Woody spends all of his time playing a virtual reality game called "Better Life" as an avatar named Brock. He has a virtual girlfriend named Peaches (who turns out to be Addison). Cody tells him that he cannot live his whole life through a virtual reality game. Guest stars: Matthew Timmons as Woody Fink, Rachael Bell as Addison, Erin Cardillo as Emma Tutweiller, Michael Hitchcock as Mr. Blanket Note: This is the first episode of the series to have two sub-plots. Absent: Phill Lewis as Mr. Moseby
29	8	"Lost at Sea"	Rich Correll	Danny Kallis & Pamela Eells O'Connell	October 2, 2009	207–208	7.6
After the gang returns for a new semester, London finds she does not have enough closet space, Cody deals with his voice cracking, and Zack's fake welcome buddy plan falls flat when Woody reveals it to his target. The whole gang ends up in London's closet lifeboat and Woody accidentally sets them adrift in the Pacific Ocean. After escaping sharks and arguing over supplies, Cody and Bailey argue about which way to set sail, and though the crew sides with Bailey, Cody changes the sail during the night, landing them on a deserted island. Bailey angrily breaks up with Cody. Cody thinks that manly outdoorsman Zack is winning Bailey's heart over the next few days. London, however, thinks that she has won an all-expense paid trip to a five-star island resort, and Woody is stuck with keeping up the facade. Cody desperately tries to win Bailey back, and comes up with a plan to get everyone back to the ship. Meanwhile, Mr. Moseby and Ms. Tutweiller search the ship for the five teens, and end up adrift in their own boat, having the same argument that Cody and Bailey had. They eventually end up on the same island that the group was on moments ago, with Ms. Tutweiller finding a note written by London to prove it. Guest stars: Matthew Timmons as Woody Fink, Erin Cardillo as Emma Tutweiller, Michelle DeFraites as Jenna Note: This is a one-hour episode and was broadcast in 4:3 letterboxed on Disney Channel's standard-definition feed (the first episode of a Disney Channel series to be shown in this format on the SD feed). All previous and subsequent episodes are shown in a 4:3 full-screen pan and scan picture format on the SD feed.
30	9	"Roomies"	Danny Kallis	Danny Kallis & Pamela Eells O'Connell	October 16, 2009	210	4.7
Marcus Little, a former child singer, arrives on the SS Tipton and is assigned to share a cabin with Zack, who is trying to figure out Marcus' true identity. When Marcus reveals he is a former child artist named Lil' Little, he reveals how he came on board to try and have a normal childhood. Zack then decides to help him live as a child although Marcus later gets annoyed when Zack asks for an autograph from him for his new crush. After a talk with Mr. Moseby, Marcus realizes that he overreacted and gives Zack's crush an autograph and accepts the offer of friendship. Meanwhile, Cody and Bailey play against each other in a series of friendly competitions. Guest star: Matthew Timmons as Woody Fink Note: Doc Shaw joins the main cast as Marcus Little.
31	10	"Crossing Jordin"	Mark Cendrowski	Jeff Hodsden & Tim Pollock	October 23, 2009	213	5.2
Zack, Cody, and Marcus attempt to write a song for the ship's guest singer, Jordin Sparks, to perform, but with less than her best interests in mind. Meanwhile, London meets the winner of a contest where a contestant gets to be London's best friend for a week on the ship, but the winner acts like a brat and also steals London's identity. Special guest star: Jordin Sparks as herself Guest stars: Cameron Escalante as Alyssa, Dave Secor as George Note: Jordin Sparks performs the song "Battlefield" from her 2009 album of the same name.
32	11	"Bermuda Triangle"	Phill Lewis	Adam Lapidus & Jeny Quine	November 13, 2009	211	4.8
Zack and Cody receive a $200 check from their parents for their 16th birthday, but have an argument about how to spend it and end up ripping it in half. Following this, Zack wishes he was an only child and Cody wishes for the same, saying that nothing would make him happier. Once the ship enters the Bermuda Triangle, a parallel universe opens up and their wish comes true; the twins were split up at birth, with Zack growing up with only Carey and Cody growing up with only Kurt. Zack grew up to be a nerd, nerdier than Cody ever was, with no sense of fun. Cody, on the other hand, grew with Zack's personality pushed to the extreme: rude, crude, sexist, nasty and obnoxious. Even so, Zack is still surrounded by friends, including Bailey (whom he has a crush on), Woody and Marcus, while Cody is a friendless loner. When the two of them learn they're brothers, they decide to hang out together, with the both of them enjoying it. Later, Cody realizes how he is perceived when he overhears Bailey, Marcus, Woody and London badmouthing him and admitting they only inviting him to Zack's upcoming birthday party because he is Zack's brother. At the party, the ship travels through the Bermuda Triangle again, and turns everything back to normal. There, the twins forgive each other as they get another check, only to tear it up again when they argue over who gets to buy what, as Zack wanted to be nice and get the thing Cody wanted, and vice versa. Guest star: Matthew Timmons as Woody Fink Note: This episode and "Snakes on a Boat" are the only episodes of the series that Phill Lewis both directs and appears in. Lewis was absent from all other episodes that he directed.
33	12	"The Beauty and the Fleeced"	Lex Passaris	Dan Signer	November 20, 2009	212	4.8
Zack, Marcus, and Woody create a fake beauty pageant so they can meet girls. When Mr. Moseby learns of their plans, he punishes them by forcing them to see it through. Meanwhile, London intimidates Bailey by bragging about her previous success in beauty pageants. As a result, Bailey enters the SS Tipton's pageant to try to beat London, and hires Cody as her coach. Guest stars: Matthew Timmons as Woody Fink, Brittany Ross as Capri Note: When Cody tells Bailey that he has been in a beauty pageant before, this is a reference to The Suite Life of Zack & Cody episode, "The Fairest of Them All". It also references the pilot where Bailey disguised as a boy.
34	13	"The Swede Life"	Ellen Gittelsohn	Jeff Hodsden & Tim Pollock	December 4, 2009	215	N/A
Zack, Cody, London, and Bailey visit Martensgrav, a Swedish town founded by the twins' ancestors (portrayed by Dylan and Cole Sprouse), only to discover the townsfolk consider the great Martin family as villains. Meanwhile, Marcus and Mr. Moseby want to visit a museum for the Swedish pop group ABBA, but get stuck at a Swedish furniture store, Umaka (a spoof of IKEA) in search of a missing screw for Moseby's Swedish nightstand. Guest stars: Ed Begley Jr. as Mayor Ragnar, Katie Gill as Dorta, Mary Kate McGeehan as Helga
35	14	"Mother of the Groom"	Rich Correll	Danny Kallis	January 8, 2010	217	3.8
Esteban comes aboard the SS Tipton with his fiancée, Francesca, and his mother. While the boys have a bachelor party for Esteban, London and Bailey try to help Esteban's mother (who disapproves of the marriage) find something she enjoys aside from taking care of her son so that she can accept Esteban's marriage and move on with life. Guest stars: Charo as Señora Ramirez, Adrian R'Mante as Esteban Ramirez, Marisa Ramirez as Francesca
36	15	"The Defiant Ones"	Rich Correll	Dan Signer	January 15, 2010	218	4.0
Cody creates a web of lies when he tries to cover up his failure to do his homework. He tells Ms. Tutweiller that he did not do his homework because he was taking care of Bailey's broken leg, saying she tripped over Ivana, having London confirm it, even though Ivana was not on the ship. However, when London lets it slip that Ivana was not on board, they make up another lie that she was eaten by a crocodile someone seemingly snuck on board after the ship left Australia. Ms. Tutweiller then told the passengers over the PA that a crocodile was on the loose. After faking a crocodile attack, everything is calming down, but Cody still did not do his homework, to which he just accepted his bad grade rather than lie again. Meanwhile, Zack and Mr. Moseby are handcuffed together by Mr. Blanket in order for them to learn to get along. Guest stars: Erin Cardillo as Emma Tutweiller, Michael Hitchcock as Mr. Blanket
37	16	"Any Given Fantasy"	Rich Correll	Jeff Hodsden & Tim Pollock	January 18, 2010 (Disney XD); January 22, 2010 (Disney Channel)	220	5.2
When Mr. Moseby forbids the students from playing football on the ship, they become interested in playing fantasy football. London talks her way into having a team in the fantasy football league and after impressing the boys with her knowledge of football, London unveils her team's weapon, Kurt Warner. London also promises the winners of the football a golden trophy, as a result, Zack, Marcus, and Woody dress up like mascots to gain London's trophy. Meanwhile, Cody becomes upset when his friends tease him due to his poor football skills so he enlists Kirby as his coach. Guest stars: Windell D. Middlebrooks as Kirby, Matthew Timmons as Woody Fink, Kurt Warner as himself Absent: Debby Ryan as Bailey Pickett
38	17	"Rollin' With the Holmies"	Mark Cendrowski	Jim Geoghan & Dan Signer	January 29, 2010	214	N/A
When the ship docks in London, England, Cody attempts to solve a mystery surrounding a stolen book that belongs to Queen Elizabeth II. Meanwhile, Mr. Moseby teaches Zack and Marcus how to play croquet so they can compete against London's snobby new crush, Lord Wicket, and his friend Snively in order for Marcus to gain London's affection. Later, Cody manages to reveal that the detective in the museum is in fact the thief. He is arrested and the Queen invites Cody, Bailey and Woody for tea as a reward for finding her book. Guest stars: Charles Shaughnessy as Constable, Jarrett Sleeper as Wicket, Matthew Timmons as Woody Fink
39	18	"Can You Dig It?"	Phill Lewis	Adam Lapidus & Jeny Quine	February 12, 2010	223	N/A
When Zack accidentally finds the crown of the ancient Princess Zaria, he takes credit for all the years of research Cody did, making Cody angry. Zaria's spirit possesses Bailey who is now desperate to get her crown back and punishes Zack for taking it. Now, it is up to Cody to save Zack and release the spirit from Bailey. Guest stars: Erin Cardillo as Emma Tutweiller, Alex Cambert as Luis, Lesli Margherita as Isabel Absent: Phill Lewis as Mr. Moseby
40	19	"London's Apprentice"	Rich Correll	Pamela Eells O'Connell	February 26, 2010	219	3.6
Mr. Tipton wants London to present him with a great new invention, so London offers a one million dollar prize for the person who creates the best new invention. Zack, Cody, Bailey, Marcus, and Mr. Moseby present their ideas to London for her to decide which one is the best. Meanwhile, London gives Kirby the bag containing the one million dollars, but he loses the bag and must retrace his steps to find it. Guest star: Windell D. Middlebrooks as Kirby
41	20	"Once Upon a Suite Life"	Bob Koherr	Jeny Quine & Dan Signer	March 5, 2010	225	3.43
Zack, Cody, London, and Bailey fall asleep during class when Ms. Tutweiller is lecturing about fairy tales. They each dream that they are the characters in classic fairy tales such as Snow White, Hansel and Gretel, and Jack and the Beanstalk. Guest stars: Erin Cardillo as Emma Tutweiller, Matthew Timmons as Woody Fink, Michael Airington as The Mirror
42	21	"Marriage 101"	Rich Correll	Jeny Quine	March 19, 2010	221	N/A
A class assignment requires the students to simulate marriage to learn the challenges that face married couples in everyday life. Cody 'marries' Bailey, Zack 'marries' London, and Woody 'marries' Addison with Marcus as their child. However, when the "Wheel of Life" gives Cody an injury, he and Bailey begin to fight, as he was taking it too literally by sitting in bed all day with an unnecessary cast on his leg. Guest stars: Erin Cardillo as Emma Tutweiller, Matthew Timmons as Woody Fink, Rachael Bell as Addison Note: London states that her father married eight times, but in "Ala-ka-scram!" she says that Karina, the magician's assistant, is her fourteenth mother, and in the last episode of The Suite Life of Zack & Cody, she says her father has had twelve weddings. Absent: Phill Lewis as Mr. Moseby
43	22	"Model Behavior"	Bob Koherr	Jeff Hodsden & Tim Pollock	March 27, 2010	228	N/A
When Mr. Moseby leaves to go to a reunion, Zack and Marcus decide to throw a party on the sky deck with models. Janice and Jessica, from the Boston Tipton, come aboard the ship as models and while Janice tries to draw Zack's attention, Cody believes Bailey is jealous of Jessica. Meanwhile, to distract the modeling agent from discovering the party, Woody pretends to be a male model named Woodlander. Special guest star: Kathie Lee Gifford as Cindy Guest stars: Camilla and Rebecca Rosso as Janice and Jessica, Matthew Timmons as Woody Fink, Cassidy Gifford as Kate
44	23	"Rock the Kasbah"	Rich Correll	Adam Lapidus	April 16, 2010	222	N/A
When the ship docks in Morocco, Cody wants to buy earrings for Bailey, but Zack insists he bargain with the cashier for a better price. Meanwhile, London, Bailey, Marcus, and Woody discover a magic lamp that contains a genie willing to grant wishes, causing them to argue over which wishes should be granted. Guest stars: Amro Salama as Youssef, Matthew Timmons as Woody Fink, Matthew Willig as Genie
45	24	"I Brake for Whales"	Rich Correll	Jeny Quine & Adam Lapidus	April 23, 2010	216	N/A
The SS Tipton is going straight in the path of endangered blue whales motivating Zack, Cody, Bailey, and Marcus to try their best to change the ship's course, after Moseby refuses to stop the ship. They lock themselves into the engine room hoping the whales will safely pass, however they discover it is not as easy as it seems. Cody begins to faint due to heat exhaustion, Marcus becomes desperate for water, and Zack loses it and tries to break free. Eventually, Kirby breaks into the engine room to attempt to stop them, but after seeing the whales on Cody's laptop, he decides to go along with the plan. However, Moseby later comes in and after being shown the clip of the whales, he is touched but still forces them to leave. However, he locks himself in and decides to go with the plan too, much to everyone's delight. Later, Moseby reveals that the captain has agreed to leave the engines off and Mr. Tipton has been thrilled with the publicity that the kids got for saving the whales. Guest star: Windell D. Middlebrooks as Kirby
46	25	"Seven Seas News"	Bob Koherr	Pamela Eells O'Connell	May 7, 2010	224	3.5
The students of Seven Seas High take over the Seven Seas News. Zack and Bailey clash as co-anchors as a result of Zack being more popular, London is confused by the green screen, and Cody investigates a missing passenger. Guest stars: Matthew Timmons as Woody Fink, Erin Cardillo as Emma Tutweiller, Windell D. Middlebrooks as Kirby Absent: Doc Shaw as Marcus Little, Phill Lewis as Mr. Moseby
47	26	"Starship Tipton"	Kelly Sandefur	Jeny Quine & Dan Signer	May 14, 2010	227	3.6
Many years in the future, Zack's desecendant, Zirk, pulls a prank on a race of alien beings while aboard a starship, which causes destructive retaliation, causing a Moseby robot to be sent back to destroy Zack, prompting Zack, Cody, London, Bailey, Marcus, and Mr. Moseby to travel to the future to stop Zirk from pranking the aliens. Special guest star: George Takei as Rome Tipton Guest stars: Erin Cardillo as Emma Tutweiller, Joe Green as Robot Moseby, Jonathan Kite as Anterian Note: This episode was broadcast in 4:3 letterboxed format on Disney Channel's standard-definition feed, instead of the regular 4:3 full-screen pan and scan picture format (the second episode of the series to be aired in this manner, after "Lost at Sea" from earlier in the season). The episode is an homage to Star Trek.
48	27	"Mean Chicks"	Rich Correll	Adam Lapidus	June 11, 2010	226	N/A
Bailey bets London $1 million that she cannot go on one week without insulting her, so London asks Mr. Blanket for help to try not to insult Bailey. When Bailey loses the bet, London insults her one million times. Meanwhile, Cody attempts to avoid the assaults of a seagull after not permitting the seagull to eat fries while Mr. Moseby tries to overcome his recently developed fear of bees. Guest stars: Michael Hitchcock as Mr. Blanket
49	28	"Breakup in Paris"	Rich Correll	Pamela Eells O'Connell & Adam Lapidus	June 18, 2010	229–230	3.7
Cody and Bailey are planning to celebrate their one year anniversary when the SS Tipton docks in Paris. Cody asks London to help him make his date perfect. However, a big misunderstanding begins when Bailey sees Cody with London (who were just practicing the date) and mistakes her as the "hideous French girl". The next day, the day of the anniversary, Cody sees Bailey with another guy, Jean Luc, who was just trying to cheer her up. Bailey and Cody start arguing about the misunderstanding, and decide it would be better if they broke up. Meanwhile, Zack and Woody are pursued by art thieves. Guest stars: Al Benner as Pascal, Nick Roux as Jean Luc, Stelio Savante as Stephane, Matthew Timmons as Woody Fink, Larry Vanburen Jr. as Dante Note: This is a one-hour episode, and two versions of the episode exist. The version that aired on June 19, 2010, the night after the episode's original airing, featured a third storyline involving Marcus discovering that a young boy is claiming to be Lil' Little (Marcus' former rap persona), leading him to try to expose the kid as a fraud.

=== Season 3 (2010–11) ===
No. overall	No. in season	Title	Directed by	Written by	Original release date	Prod. code	U.S. viewers (millions)
50	1	"The Silent Treatment"	Phill Lewis	Dan Signer	July 2, 2010	305	3.4
One day after the events of Paris, Cody leaves the ship following his breakup with Bailey to join a monk-like club which he hopes will help him get over the breakup. Zack and Woody are determined to go there and save Cody. Meanwhile, London and Miss Tutweiller try to console Bailey by giving her relationship advice. Guest stars: Andy Richter as Brother Theodore, Erin Cardillo as Emma Tutweiller, Matthew Timmons as Woody Fink Absent: Doc Shaw as Marcus Little, Phill Lewis as Mr. Moseby
51	2	"Rat Tale"	Joel Zwick	Jeff Hodsden & Tim Pollock	July 9, 2010	308	N/A
No longer a couple, Cody and Bailey must decide who keeps Buck, their pet rat. Kirby investigates both to see who will make the better owner, but Woody is bitten by Buck, creating a super-hero alter-ego Ratman, which is breaking apart Zack and his new girlfriend, Sloane. Guest stars: Mackenzie Baker as Sloane, Windell D. Middlebrooks as Kirby, Matthew Timmons as Woody Fink Absent: Doc Shaw as Marcus Little, Phill Lewis as Mr. Moseby
52	3	"So You Think You Can Date?"	Joel Zwick	Mark Amato & Sally Lapiduss	July 16, 2010	306	3.4
A dance is coming up for the students. Having broken up, Cody and Bailey lie about having dates to the dance, so they quickly try to find a backup date to back up their lie. When London and Zack offer up misguided advice, it surprisingly works. Meanwhile, Woody is tired of Tutweiller and Moseby arguing about who should get the skydeck for the school dance, so he makes them share the skydeck. It is revealed through flashback that Mr. Moseby and Miss Tutweiler's interest in the Middle Ages and 1980s, respectively, comes from the tribulations they endured as outcasts in their youth. Through understanding, Mr. Moseby convinces Emma that they both have become successful adults and have overcome their painful pasts. Guest stars: Erin Cardillo as Emma Tutweiller, Rachael Marie as Cissy, Markus Silbiger as Josh, Matthew Timmons as Woody Absent: Doc Shaw as Marcus Little
53	4	"My Oh Maya"	Joel Zwick	Jeff Hodsden & Tim Pollock	July 23, 2010	301	N/A
Zack becomes attracted to a girl named Maya, but when he realizes he is actually falling in love with her, he attempts to use part of the six month plan that Cody used for Bailey. Meanwhile, Dante, the boy who stole Marcus's identity in Paris, stows away on board to have Marcus produce his next album. In addition, Cody is trying to condition himself to forget about Bailey by flicking a rubber band against his wrist every time he thinks about her while she is visiting her home. Guest stars: Zoey Deutch as Maya, Larry Vanburen, Jr. as Dante, Elle McLemore as Gina Absent: Debby Ryan as Bailey Pickett
54	5	"Das Boots"	Carl Lauten	Pamela Eells O'Connell	July 30, 2010	303	N/A
After agreeing to help London remove shoes from her submarine, Zack, London, Maya and Woody are all trapped in London's shoe submarine with only enough air for thirty minutes. Meanwhile, Marcus helps Cody prepare to play chess against Sasha Matryoshka, a beautiful Russian junior champion. Guest stars: Matthew Timmons as Woody Fink, Erin Cardillo as Emma Tutweiller, Zoey Deutch as Maya, Cody Kennedy as Mischa Note: Although listed in the credits as Mischa, the character was called "Sasha Matryoshka" during the episode. Absent: Debby Ryan as Bailey Pickett
55	6	"Bon Voyage"	Adam Weissman	Adam Lapidus	August 20, 2010	304	4.0
When the new aqua lounge is flooded, Mr. Tipton orders Mr. Moseby to kick off whoever was responsible for the mess. Moseby assumes Zack is the culprit, but Cody, London, Bailey and Woody all believe they are individually responsible for the disaster for different reasons (although London actually wants to take the blame in order to get thrown off the ship). It is eventually revealed that it was actually Moseby himself who caused the flood by dropping his pocket hankie into the tank. To help Moseby keep his job, London takes the blame and just gets an allowance cut. Meanwhile, Marcus has been planning a rap musical. At the end of the episode, he leaves the ship to make a Broadway musical based on his hit song "Retainer Baby" after he and Zack videotaped demos of the songs (which helps to clear Zack's name after Moseby accuses him of the Aqua Lounge incident) which he sent to Broadway producers. Guest stars: Matthew Timmons as Woody Fink, Lisa K. Wyatt as Frankie Featured song: Wonderful Surprise by Shawn Hlookoff Last appearance: Doc Shaw as Marcus Little Note: This was Doc Shaw's final appearance in the series as Marcus Little, yet this is also the first episode of the season in which the entire main cast is present.
56	7	"Computer Date"	Joel Zwick	Jeny Quine	August 27, 2010	302	N/A
Arwin comes on board the ship to improve it by adding a robot. However, problems start to occur when it begins to have feelings for Cody. Meanwhile, London and Woody enlist Zack's help to pass a gym class. Guest stars: Tabitha Morella as Callie, Brian Stepanek as Arwin Hawkhauser, Matthew Timmons as Woody Fink Notes: Because Disney Channel airs episodes out of production order, Doc Shaw is still listed in the opening credits in this episode. Also, despite her inability to perform in gym class in this particular episode, London was seen tutoring Maddie in P.E. class in an episode of The Suite Life of Zack & Cody. Absent: Debby Ryan as Bailey Pickett
57	8	"Party On!"	Joel Zwick	Jeff Hodsden & Tim Pollock	September 10, 2010	309	4.0
When singer Sean Kingston comes on board, he immediately becomes attracted to London. Zack, hoping to do something special for Maya's birthday, misleads Sean into throwing a surprise party for London and also making Mr. Moseby believe the party is for him, when it is actually for Maya. Meanwhile, Cody goes with Bailey to a Belgian chocolate factory on a couple's tour and runs into Woody who mistakenly came instead of attending a hiking trip. Special guest star: Sean Kingston as himself Guest stars: Zoey Deutch as Maya, Napoleon Ryan as Sebastian Nougat, Matthew Timmons as Woody Fink
58	9	"Love and War"	Eric Dean Seaton	Jeny Quine	September 24, 2010	311	2.8
Zack and Maya are finally a couple, and Zack is surprising everyone by being a good boyfriend. However, Zack soon faces his first challenge when Maya is chosen to recite a poem at Poetpalooza at the same time as an important guys video game night. Meanwhile, children at a daycare take more of a liking towards London than Bailey, causing Bailey to become increasingly jealous of London. Guest stars: Zoey Deutch as Maya, Taylor Groothuis as Sally, Matthew Timmons as Woody
59	10	"Trouble in Tokyo"	Eric Dean Seaton	Jeny Quine & Dan Signer	September 29, 2010 (Disney XD); October 15, 2010 (Disney Channel)	307	3.4
When the ship docks in Japan, Zack and Cody visit their mom who is doing a new commercial. Meanwhile, London is trying to avoid going to the dentist and Woody challenges a sumo wrestler. Special guest star: Kim Rhodes as Carey Martin Guest stars: Matthew Timmons as Woody Fink, Americus Abesamis as Mikio, Tom Choi as Mr. Hashimoto Note: According to Eric Dean Seaton's website, this episode was originally going to be called "Japandemonium!"
60	11	"The Ghost and Mr. Martin"	Joel Zwick	Adam Lapidus & Jeny Quine	October 8, 2010	310	3.3
When the ship docks in New Orleans, Zack is haunted by the ghost of a captain of a sunken ship. To solve the mystery of the sunken ship, with the help of Cody and Woody, he dives down to retrieve the captain's compass. After examining the compass and doing research, Zack proves history wrong. Meanwhile, London and Bailey try to help Mr. Moseby overcome his fear of playing the piano in front of a crowd. Guest stars: Matthew Timmons as Woody Fink, Anthony Bonaventura as Captain Entenille Note: Zack tells Cody that ghosts really exist, because they first saw one while they were living at the Tipton Hotel. He is making a reference to The Suite Life of Zack & Cody episode "The Ghost of Suite 613".
61	12	"Senior Ditch Day"	Phill Lewis	Mark Amato & Sally Lapiduss	October 22, 2010	320	3.5
Zack, London and Woody go to a ritzy beach club in Argentina for Senior Ditch Day, but when the bouncer will not let Woody in, London and Zack go without him. In an effort to get in, Woody claims himself as royalty and becomes a jerk to London and Zack when they ask to be in a VIP area with him. Meanwhile, in an effort to keep their perfect attendance records, Bailey and Cody show up for class, which annoys Ms. Tutweiller who was looking forward to her day off. She is forced to show them how to have fun, which they think is a class; at witts end, she says they pass. Guest stars: Matthew Timmons as Woody Fink, Erin Cardillo as Emma Tutweiller, Fabio as Captain Hawk, Christiann Castellanos as Valentina, Jack Guzman as Bouncer Note: Cody claims that he has never missed a day of school since kindergarten, but in the parent series, The Suite Life of Zack & Cody, in the episode "What the Hey?", Zack, Cody and Bob ditch school to go to the mall. Absent: Phill Lewis as Mr. Moseby
62	13	"My Sister's Keeper"	Phill Lewis	Jeny Quine	November 5, 2010	315	3.2
When Woody announces his sister (whom both Zack and Cody thought was going to be hideous) will be coming on board, Cody keeps her company, much to the dismay of Woody and Bailey. Meanwhile, London searches for a "twin" to get her to do her dirty work, but things go wrong when her twin falls in love with Zack. Guest star: Matthew Timmons as Woody Fink, Linsey Godfrey as Willa Fink, Jane Oshita as London's Double Absent: Phill Lewis as Mr. Moseby
63	14	"Frozen"	Phill Lewis	Dan Signer	November 27, 2010	312	N/A
Cody visits a remote scientific research station in Antarctica, and Zack and Woody tag along with him. But when the scientist uses their snowmobile to replenish his supplies, he gets stuck in a snow storm leaving the trio cold, hungry, and alone. Meanwhile, London's favorite designer visits the SS Tipton to announce his retirement due to lack of inspiration, entitling London and Bailey to inspire him. Guest star: Matthew Timmons as Woody Fink, Brian Posehn as Dr. Cork, Todd Sherry as Arturo Vitali Absent: Phill Lewis as Mr. Moseby
64	15	"A London Carol"	Shelley Jensen	Jeff Hodsden & Tim Pollock	December 3, 2010	313	4.1
As Christmas approaches, London is too selfish to give anything for homeless and sick children during Christmas when Cody and Bailey asked for donations for needy children. On Christmas Eve night, London's mirror takes her back to the past, the present and future to learn her lesson. London's past is somewhat happy, as Mr. Moseby was always there for her when Mr. Tipton never showed up for the holiday. She sees the present next, which she dismisses as unimportant due to it being everyday life. London is then shown herself several decades later, in which she keeps leaving out milk and cookies for Santa Claus, and no gifts are ever given to her; she misunderstands that Moseby has "gone to the hotel in the sky", but learns that Bailey (who got tired of London's ungrateful attitude), Cody and Zack (who lives with Bailey and Cody, still a playboy) never speak to her anymore. London learns that it is better to give than to receive and cherish her friends, selling her Christmas presents to buy gifts for the needy children, along with Cody, Zack, Mr. Moseby and Bailey. Meanwhile, Zack has trouble waking up on time to go to work, so he and Cody set up an elaborate alarm. Guest stars: Michael Airington as The Mirror, Haley Tju as young London. Note: This is only the second episode of the season in which Matthew Timmons does not appear as Woody.
65	16	"The Play's the Thing"	Joel Zwick	Pamela Eells O'Connell	January 7, 2011	314	3.6
After assigning the class to write their own play, Ms. Tutweiler selects Cody's play to be presented in class. However, Bailey refuses to participate after realizing the play is about the break-up between her and Cody, forcing Cody to act as Bailey and Zack as Cody. In the end, Cody realizes that he made the biggest mistake ever breaking up with Bailey. Guest stars: Matthew Timmons as Woody Fink, Erin Cardillo as Emma Tutweiller, Rachael Kathryn Bell as Addison, Kevin Makely as Bruno
66	17	"Twister: Part 1"	Bob Koherr	Adam Lapidus	January 14, 2011	316	4.4
London offers to take Bailey to Kettlecorn to celebrate her grandmother's 90th birthday, but when their blimp malfunctions they are forced to drive the rest of the way. Elsewhere, Zack, Cody, and Woody challenge Mr. Moseby and his brother, who is visiting with his teammates, to a game of basketball, that is until they learn his brother is NBA star Dwight Howard. Meanwhile, Cody is unsure of where or why Bailey has gone to and laments her absence, until he discovers that she went to her family farm. He decides to go there to ultimately win her affections back. Guest stars: Matthew Timmons as Woody Fink, Dwight Howard as himself, Deron Williams as himself, Kevin Love as himself
67	18	"Twister: Part 2"	Bob Koherr	Jeff Hodsden & Tim Pollock	January 15, 2011	317	5.2
Cody arrives in Kettlecorn and is surprised to see that Moose is also there to get Bailey back. Throughout his visit, Bailey's father Clyde takes an immediate disliking to him, making it worse when Cody accidentally hits Clyde in the eye with a cob of corn. Before Cody can tell Bailey how he feels about her, a tornado approaches and everyone evacuates into the Pickett's storm shelter. As the tornado hits, Bailey is knocked out and dreams that she is Dorothy Gale and is trying to find her way back home through the Land of Oz. As Bailey unwittingly re-enacts the story of The Wonderful Wizard of Oz, she encounters Moose as the Scarecrow, Cody as the Tin Woodman, London as Glinda the Good Witch, Woody as the Cowardly Lion, Zack as a Flying Monkey, and the Wicked Witch of the West, and Mr. Moseby as a Munchkin. She wakes up from her dream and has to decide between Moose and Cody. Meanwhile, on the ship, Zack tries to get some extra money by renting out his and Woody's rooms to a family, the Everharts, who have no place to go after the ship is overbooked. Moseby is initially mad until Mr. Everhart tells him that his family plans to come again next year and rent out an entire deck. Special guest star: Hutch Dano as Moose Guest stars: Matthew Timmons as Woody Fink, Linda Porter as Grammy Pickett, Ginette Rhodes as Eunice Pickett, Mark Teich as Mr. Everhart, Joe Dietl as Clyde Pickett
68	19	"Twister: Part 3"	Bob Koherr	Dan Signer	January 16, 2011	318	7.1
The group starts rebuilding Kettlecorn after the tornado, but they continue to struggle to pay off the damage. As a result, London's father, Mr. Tipton arrives (who finally reveals himself) to discuss aiding their monetary costs. Meanwhile, Zack, Woody, and Mr. Moseby attempt to sneak into Kettlecorn with a Search and Rescue team. Unfortunately, Mr. Tipton wants to destroy the farm and build a plastic bag factory; Cody and Bailey manage to convince him it is a bad idea, but Zack and Woody overdo it by claiming there's a flesh-eating virus loose. Having seen the movie the two got their idea from, Mr. Tipton changes his mind again; however, London stands up to her father, succeeding in forcing him to leave Bailey's home alone. Strangely, Mr. Tipton is proud of London betraying him; it is also revealed in this episode that he can never remember her unless they meet in person or she is causing him trouble. It is also revealed that Mr. Tipton does not remember or know Moseby at all, not knowing of his job on the ship or the hotel in Boston, and is only reminded when Moseby brings up how he was the best man at his ninth wedding. Grandma Pickett then gives Bailey a can filled with her savings, so she can go back to Seven Seas High. Cody and Bailey then get back together. Grandma Pickett later gives a necklace to Zack as he was trying to find an anniversary gift for Maya. Special guest star: John Michael Higgins as Wilfred Tipton Guest stars: Matthew Timmons as Woody Fink, Linda Porter as Grammy Pickett, Ginette Rhodes as Eunice Pickett, Joe Dietl as Clyde Pickett, Michael Ralph as Sergeant Pepper Note: This is the first time in both The Suite Life of Zack & Cody as well as The Suite Life on Deck series that Mr. Tipton was ever shown.
69	20	"Snakes on a Boat"	Phill Lewis	Dan Signer & Adam Lapidus	March 4, 2011	319	3.8
London dares Woody to go down into the ship's cargo hold where he accidentally opens a crate containing numerous snakes, thereby releasing them. Ultimately, Mr. Moseby uses one of his exercising techniques to capture the escaped snakes. Meanwhile, after a series of couples games, Cody learns he cannot make Bailey laugh so he goes to great lengths to try to make her laugh and Maya learns that Zack has dated more girls than she thought. Guest stars: Matthew Timmons as Woody Fink, Zoey Deutch as Maya
70	21	"Prom Night"	Eric Dean Seaton	Jeff Hodsden & Tim Pollock	March 18, 2011	321	3.02
After the students pull a prank on Mr. Moseby by putting him to sleep and then sending him up into the air on a deck chair with balloons tied to it, he cancels the senior prom. However, Zack comes up with a plan to have a "secret prom" after hearing Ms. Tutweiller discussing a "secret school" in history class. Meanwhile, Bailey tries to get everybody to vote her for prom queen while Cody helps Woody ask Addison to prom. Ultimately, the kids award the roles of king and queen to Mr. Moseby and Ms. Tutweiller after everyone votes "not Bailey" as she had gone overboard in trying to get everyone's vote. After prom, Moseby gets revenge on Zack by doing the same prank to him as he had done earlier. Guest stars: Matthew Timmons as Woody Fink, Erin Cardillo as Emma Tutweiller, Zoey Deutch as Maya, Rachael Kathryn Bell as Addison
71	22	"Graduation on Deck"	Eric Dean Seaton	Pamela Eells O'Connell	May 6, 2011	322	4.6
In the lead up to graduation, Mr. Moseby announces that London's dad, Mr. Tipton, is selling the ship and it will be dismantled within a week once they get to New York City. London starts receiving private Spanish tutoring by Ms. Tutweiller in order to pass it to obtain her high school diploma. Maya is accepted into the Peace Corps and breaks up with Zack because she does not believe a long-distance relationship will work, upsetting Zack and compelling him to refuse to attend graduation. Cody also refuses to attend because he was rejected from Yale University while Bailey was accepted. Carey and Kurt arrive on the ship and attempt to change their children's minds. Carey consoles Cody while Kurt consoles Zack, spurring the twins to convince each other to go to graduation. London successfully passes Spanish through a Helen Keller-like learning style. When graduation is disrupted by the destruction of the ship, Mr. Moseby calls Mr. Tipton to stall the demolition. When Mr. Tipton refuses to budge, Mr. Moseby defies him and proceeds with the ceremony. After graduation, Woody and Addison come out with yearbooks and the group shares their final moments together. Bailey decides to go to Yale, with Cody promising to visit her. Mr. Moseby announces he is ready for a new stage in his life and proposes to Ms. Tutweiller, who instantly accepts. Zack and Cody then exit the ship for the last time, wondering what is next for them. Special guest star: Kim Rhodes as Carey Martin Guest stars: Rachael Kathryn Bell as Addison, Erin Cardillo as Emma Tutweiller, Zoey Deutch as Maya, Brian Stepanek as Arwin, Matthew Timmons as Woody Fink, Robert Torti as Kurt Martin, Lisa K. Wyatt as Frankie Featured song: "The Next Chapter of Our Lives" by Shane Harper Note: This is a special 45-minute episode. The events of this episode take place after The Suite Life Movie. As of this episode, Dylan and Cole Sprouse are the only actors to appear in every episode in the franchise, while they and Brenda Song are the only actors to appear in every episode in the series.

=== Film (2011) ===
Title	Directed by	Written by	Original U.S. air date	U.S. viewers (millions)
The Suite Life Movie	Sean McNamara	Michael Saltzman & Robert Horn	March 25, 2011	5.23
Cody plans to intern at a Marine Biology Lab in order to earn a scholarship to Yale, but the plans go off the rails when Zack causes a billion dollar wreck of two submarines. After Cody denounces his brother, both twins get an opportunity to participate in the Gemini Project, where twins are studied in order to create an emotional bond between people with the hopes of putting an end to evil in the world. Throughout the project, the twins develop connections, which allows them to understand each other better. Little did they know, the project has an evil intention. Note: The events of the movie take place before the "Graduation on Deck" episode.

== See also ==
- List of The Suite Life of Zack & Cody episodes
- List of Wizards of Waverly Place episodes - includes "Cast-Away (To Another Show)", part one of 'Wizards on Deck with Hannah Montana' crossover
- List of Hannah Montana episodes - includes "Super(stitious) Girl", part three of 'Wizards on Deck with Hannah Montana' crossover
- List of I'm in the Band episodes - includes crossover episode "Weasels on Deck"
