= The Suite Life Goes Hollywood =

- The Suite Life of Zack & Cody episodes
- Episode nos.: Season 2 Episodes 62 & 63
- Directed by: Rich Correll
- Written by: Jim Geoghan; Danny Kallis
- Production code: 238/239
- Original air date: April 20, 2007

Guest appearances
- Dante Basco; Benjamin Brown; Rich Correll; Shawn Crowder; Louis Dix; Chris Doyle; Cameron Goodman; Dina L. Margolin; Sam McMurray; Eddie Mekka; Christopher Neiman; Michelle Nordin; Brecken Palmer; Bridger Palmer; Ming Qiu; Nikki Soohoo; Josh Sussman; Jennifer Kelly Tisdale; The Veronicas; Lisa Lafaro Weselis; Richard Whiten; Merritt Yohnka; Rik Young

Episode chronology
← Previous "Back in the Game"	Next → "I Want My Mummy"

"The Suite Life Goes Hollywood" is an hour-long episode of The Suite Life of Zack & Cody. It was presented in two parts and premiered on April 20, 2007, with two encores on April 21 and April 22.

== Plot summary ==
On a winter day in the Tipton Hotel, Zack and Cody's school is closed, making Zack and Cody cause mischief in the hotel. Two failing screenwriters notice their antics and think it might make a good television show, so the boys, their mother, Maddie, London, and Mr. Moseby fly to Hollywood to consult with the writers and observe the pilot of the show, titled How Suite It Is. They stay at the Tipton in Los Angeles, which is largely identical to the one in Boston, and they meet the cast of the show: Zack and Cody are portrayed by two young boys, Carey by a young lady, Maddie by a pretty girl who pretends to like her, London by a boy, and Moseby by a tall man who talks with street slang. The producers think that the twins playing Zack and Cody are too young, and it is decided that the real Zack and Cody should play themselves. This is something the twins see as an exciting opportunity. The rest of the group is kicked out during rehearsals for interfering with the process.

After being kicked out of the stage, Maddie and London, who notice a star they like, dress in costumes for the film he is to be in in order to sneak onto the set. The director assumes them to be stunt doubles, which they initially refuse but eventually go along with because they believe are to kiss the star at the end. However, after they have done the stunts, the real actors are the ones to kiss the star, and the true stunt doubles have them removed from the set.

Back at the taping, Cody becomes nervous and forgets his lines when he finds out how many people are in the audience. This annoys Zack, and the two start to fight, resulting in their mother taking them backstage to lecture them. During the lull in the taping, one of the crew people asks the audience if there are any talented people there. The Veronicas, who are in the audience come down to the stage and sing a song, which is well liked by the crew and audience, resulting in Zack and Cody being fired and The Veronicas being hired. The group then head back to Boston the next day.

Note: The interior scenes for the Los Angeles Tipton, as well as the Hollywood set-version for the soundstage was actually filmed on the exact same set that's used to represent the Boston Tipton for the entire series (as the whole series was filmed in Los Angeles).

== Cast ==
Main Actor/Actress	Character
Cole Sprouse	Cody Martin
Dylan Sprouse	Zack Martin
Ashley Tisdale	Maddie Fitzpatrick
Brenda Song	London Tipton
Phill Lewis	Mr. Moseby
Kim Rhodes	Carey Martin

== Guest cast ==
- The Veronicas as themselves and performed "Cry".
- Jennifer Kelly Tisdale as Saloon Girl #1; stunt double for Saloon Girl #1 played by Maddie Fitzpatrick (Jennifer's sister, Ashley Tisdale). Jennifer Tisdale eventually played a recurring role as Connie, in The Suite Life on Deck.
- Dante Basco as Madrid Tipton (they wanted London to be a boy for the show).
- Benjamin Brown as Hollywood Moseby
- Richard Correll, the episode's real-life director, as TV Director
- Shawn Crowder as stunt Bell Boy
- Louis Dix as Louis
- Chris Doyle as Waiter
- Mary Z. Othman as Hollywood Maddie
- Dina L. Margolin as Maddie stunt double
- Sam McMurray as Bud
- Eddie Mekka as Western Director
- Christopher Neiman as Lou
- Michelle Nordin as Hollywood Carey
- Brecken Palmer as Hollywood Zack Martin
- Bridger Palmer as Hollywood Cody Martin
- Ming Qiu as London stunt double
- Nikki SooHoo as Saloon Girl #2
- Josh Sussman as Kid
- Lisa Lafaro Weselis as Stunt Old Lady
- Richard Whiten as Security Guard
- Merritt Yohnka as Stunt Businessman
- Rik Young as Johnny Vaine

== Reception ==
- The Suite Life of Zack & Cody episode was among the top five shows for viewers ages 6 – 11 as of April 27, 2007.
- "The Hub" called The Suite Life Goes Hollywood "Today's Might-See." They felt that some parts are overacted, but that the Maddie and London subplot is good.
- The New York Daily News described The Suite Life Goes Hollywood as "innocent," and as "a two-part adventure."
