= Have a Nice Trip =

Have a Nice Trip may refer to:

- Have a Nice Trip (The Suite Life of Zack & Cody)
- "Have a Nice Trip", an episode of the Indian adaptation The Suite Life of Karan & Kabir
- Have a Nice Trip (album), a 2003 album by Die Apokalyptischen Reiter
