= Nikki SooHoo =

American actress (born 1988)

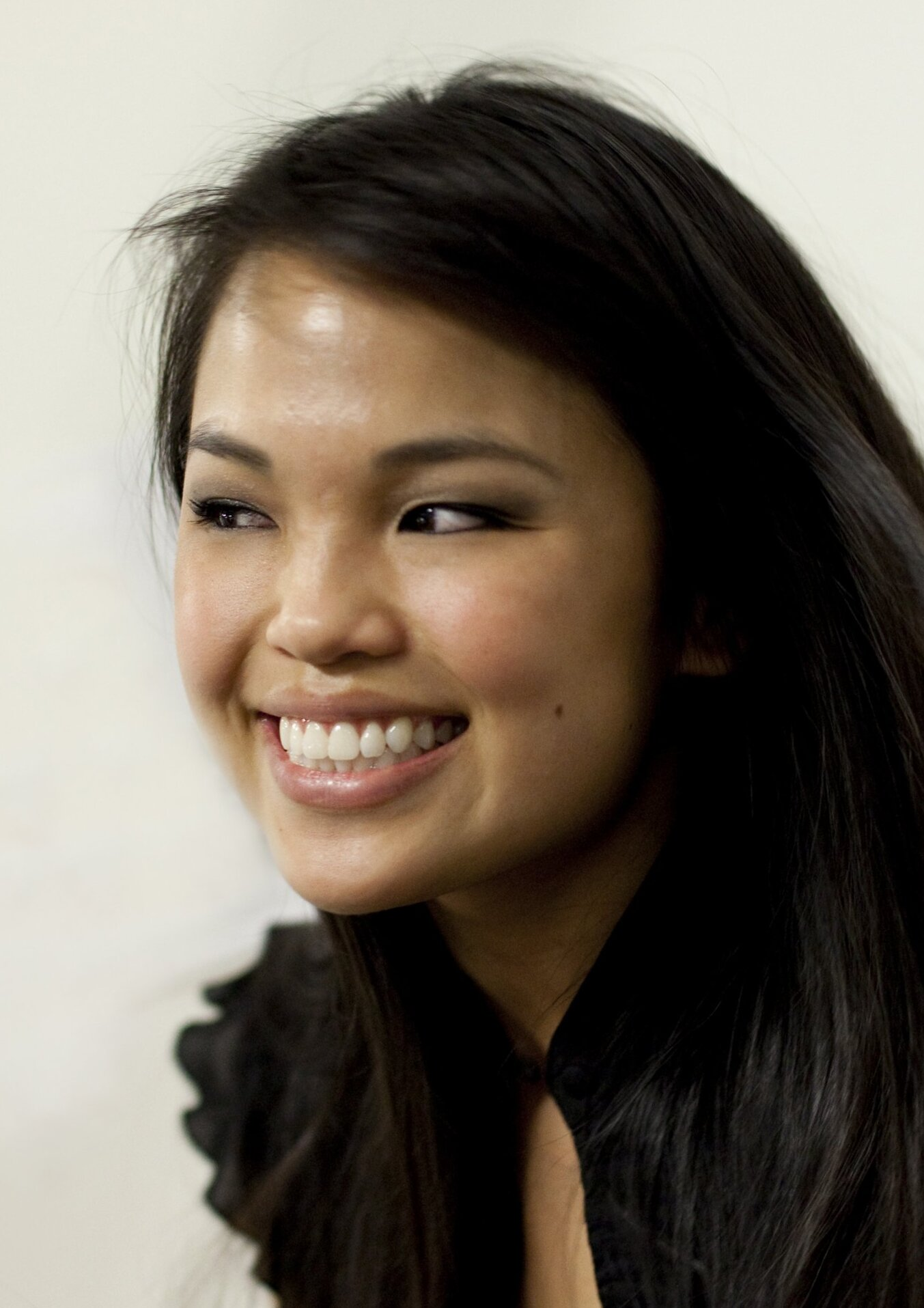
- SooHoo in 2010.
- Born: Nichole SooHoo; August 20, 1988 (age 37); Los Angeles, California, U.S.
- Occupation: Actress
- Years active: 2004–present
- Children: 1
- Relatives: Brandon Soo Hoo
- Website: www.nikkisoohoo.com

Nichole "Nikki" SooHoo (Chinese: 司徒少英; born August 20, 1988) is a Chinese American actress. She is best known for her roles as Holly in The Lovely Bones and as Wei Wei in Stick It.

== Early life ==
SooHoo attended Orange County High School of the Arts and completed a degree in World Arts and Cultures at University of California, Los Angeles.

== Career ==
SooHoo portrayed gymnast Wei Wei in the 2006 teen comedy Stick It. SooHoo had previously practiced limited gymnastics while studying dance in arts school. She starred alongside Jeff Bridges, Missy Peregrym, and Vanessa Lengies.

SooHoo played Fiona Lanky in an episode of the Disney Channel show Phil of the Future and went on to play Sue Ling in the TV series The War at Home.

She played a supporting role in Peter Jackson's 2009 film The Lovely Bones as Susie's spirit guide in Heaven, Holly. The film was based on the novel of the same name and starred Saoirse Ronan, Stanley Tucci, Mark Wahlberg, and Rachel Weisz. Later that year, SooHoo appeared in the direct-to-video film Bring It On: Fight to the Finish as cheerleader Christina.

In 2018, Soohoo played Betty Finn in the television adaptation of Heathers based on the film of the same name.

In 2020, she played Princess Azula in the fan created film Avatar: The Last Airbender: Agni Kai. The short is a live action reimaging of the final confrontation between Azula, Prince Zuko, and Katara in Nickelodeon's animated series Avatar: The Last Airbender.

SooHoo portrayed Rocky in the 2021 film Final Frequency, a thriller about a lost notebook of scientist Nikola Tesla with research that could lead to weapons of mass destruction. The movie received poor reviews.

SooHoo also now works as a life coach.

== Filmography ==
=== Film ===
Year	Title	Role	Notes
2004	Fields of Mudan	Lin	Short film
2006	Stick It	Wei Wei Yong	
2009	Bring It On: Fight to the Finish	Christina	Direct-to-video film
2009	The Lovely Bones	Denise "Holly" Le Ang	
2012	Music High	Natasha	Direct-to-video film
2013	Crush	Maya	Direct-to-video film
2015	Bound to Vengeance	Captive Girl #2	
2015	La Migra	Detective Tracy Jensen / Natasha	
2016	Chalk it Up	Cali	
2018	The Browsing Effect	Rachel	
2018	Ink & Rain	Bell	
2018	Dark, Deadly & Dreadful	Mai	Segment: "Room 731"
2020	Avatar: The Last Airbender: Agni Kai	Princess Azula	Fan film
2020	Christmas Under the Sea	Delfi	Voice role
2021	Alice's Adventures in the Wonderverse	Goldie	Voice role
2021	Final Frequency	Rocky	
2023	The Bigfoot	Goldie	Voice role
2024	The Grump's Christmas		Voice role

=== Television ===
Year	Title	Role	Notes
2005	East of Normal, West of Weird	Becca	TV movie
2005	Phil of the Future	Fiona Lanky	1 episode: "Versa Day"
2005	Testing Bob	Spirited Cheerleader	TV movie
2006	Drake & Josh	Teenage girl	1 episode: "Theater Thug"
2006	The War at Home	Sue Ling	1 episode: "How Do You Spell Relief?"
2007	The Suite Life of Zack & Cody	Saloon Girl #2	1 episode: "The Suite Life Goes Hollywood: Part 2"
2009	A Marriage	Amelia	TV movie
2009	Private Practice	Kelli	1 episode: "Right Here, Right Now"
2010	No Ordinary Family	Lisa	1 episode: "No Ordinary Vigilante"
2012	All the Wrong Places	Kai	TV movie
2013	Hell's Kitchen	Herself	1 episode: "9 Chefs Compete"
2014	Pretty Little Liars	Brenda	1 episode
2015 - 2017	Casual	Mae-Yi	3 episodes
2016	Saltwater	Erica	TV movie
2016 - 2020	Shimmer and Shine	Princess Samira	Voice role; 19 episodes
2017	Escape the Night	Kira	Season 2 Episode 3: Tangled Webs
2017	Threads	Lauren	Episode: "The Crawl Space"
2017	Wet Hot American Summer: Ten Years Later	White House Staffer	Episode: "Softball"
2017	Speechless	Counselor #2	Episode: "W-e-We're B-a-Back!"
2018	Heathers	Betty Finn	Recurring role
2018 - 2019	The Resident	Dr. Bai Liu	Season 2
2018 - 2019	Star Wars Resistance	Eila	Recurring role; voice role
2019	A Date by Christmas Eve	Maxine	TV movie
2019	Class Act	Ava Lin	Mini Series
2019	Eddie's	May Hardy	TV movie
2021	Final Frequency	Rocky	TV movie
2021	Thicker	Raf	TV movie
2021	Grey's Anatomy	Reese	Episode: "Sign O' the Times"
2021	B Positive	Nurse	Episode: "B Negative: Part 2"
2022	Love in the Limelight	Janie	TV movie
2022	The Gabby Petito Story	Miranda	TV movie
2022	Lookism (manhwa)	Mi Jin	English, Voice role
2023	Little Foot		Voice role
2024	Deck the Walls	Libby	TV movie
2024	Branching Out	Miss Weaver	TV movie

=== Web series ===
Year	Title	Role	Notes
2016	Miss 2059	Arden Young	10 episodes
2019	Escape the Night	Kira	Episode: "Tangled Web"

=== Music videos ===
Year	Title	Artist	Role
2013	Whistle While I Work It	Chester See (feat. Toby Turner and Wayne Brady)	VIP Doorgirl
2016	Don't Threaten Me with a Good Time	Panic! at the Disco	Screaming Girl

== Audio work ==
=== Podcast ===
Year	Title	Role	Notes
2019	The Deca Tapes	The Doctor	2 episodes
2019	Circle Round		Episode: "Encore: The Emperor's Challenge"
2020	WonderWerk	Kana / Iris	2 episodes

=== Video games ===
Year	Title	Role	Notes
2017	Dropzone	Lynx	
2018	Epic Seven	Angelica / Agnes / Biblica	, English version
2019	Rage 2	Gunbarrel Civilian / Goon Bike / Authority Melee Mutant	
2023	Lego 2K Drive	Sunny Monkey	
2023	Thirsty Suitors	Cici	

== Theatre ==
Year	Title	Role	Venue	Director	Notes
2015	Romeo and Juliet	Juliet Capulet	Garden Grove Theater	John Walcutt	
