= List of The Suite Life of Zack & Cody episodes =

The following is an episode list for the Disney Channel sitcom, The Suite Life of Zack & Cody, which aired from March 18, 2005, to September 1, 2008.

== Series overview ==
Season	Episodes	Originally released	
Season	Episodes	First released	Last released
1	26	March 18, 2005	January 27, 2006
2	39	February 3, 2006	June 2, 2007
3	22	June 23, 2007	September 1, 2008

== Episodes ==
=== Season 1 (2005–06) ===
No. overall	No. in season	Title	Directed by	Written by	Original release date	Prod. code	Viewers (millions)
1	1	"Hotel Hangout"	Rich Correll	Jeny Quine	March 18, 2005	102	3.5
2	2	"The Fairest of Them All"	Rich Correll	Valerie Ahern & Christian McLaughlin	March 18, 2005	104	3.71
3	3	"Maddie Checks In"	Rich Correll	Danny Kallis & Jim Geoghan	March 25, 2005	103	N/A
4	4	"Hotel Inspector"	Henry Chan	Marc Flanagan	April 1, 2005	107	N/A
5	5	"Grounded on the 23rd Floor"	Lee Shallat-Chemel	Danny Kallis & Jim Geoghan	April 8, 2005	101	2.78
6	6	"The Prince & The Plunger"	Andrew Tsao	Adam Lapidus	April 15, 2005	106	N/A
7	7	"Footloser"	Rich Correll	Bill Freiberger	April 22, 2005	105	N/A
8	8	"A Prom Story"	Jim Drake	Jeny Quine	May 6, 2005	111	N/A
9	9	"Band in Boston"	Rich Correll	Billy Riback	May 20, 2005	112	N/A
10	10	"Cody Goes to Camp"	Rich Correll	Jim Geoghan	June 3, 2005	113	N/A
11	11	"To Catch a Thief"	Jeff McCracken	Ross Brown	June 18, 2005	108	N/A
12	12	"It's a Mad, Mad, Mad Hotel"	Lex Passaris	Howard Nemetz	July 17, 2005	114	N/A
13	13	"Poor Little Rich Girl"	Dana deVally Piazza	Lloyd Garver	July 22, 2005	110	N/A
14	14	"Cookin' with Romeo and Juliet"	Jim Drake	Jeny Quine & Adam Lapidus	July 22, 2005	115	N/A
15	15	"Rumors"	Rich Correll	Bernadette Luckett	August 14, 2005	116	N/A
16	16	"Big Hair & Baseball"	Rich Correll	Pamela Eells O'Connell	August 28, 2005	117	N/A
17	17	"Rock Star in the House"	Kelly Sandefur	Jeny Quine & Howard Nemetz	September 18, 2005	122	3.3
18	18	"Smart & Smarterer"	Rich Correll	Danny Kallis & Adam Lapidus	October 10, 2005	125	N/A
19	19	"The Ghost of Suite 613"	Rich Correll	Pamela Eells O'Connell	October 14, 2005	109	N/A
20	20	"Dad's Back"	Rich Correll	Danny Kallis & Jim Geoghan	November 26, 2005	119	N/A
21	21	"Christmas at the Tipton"	Rich Correll	Jim Geoghan	December 10, 2005 (Note: This episode was first released in Disney Channel Holiday VHS/DVD on November 1, 2005.)	123	N/A
22	22	"Kisses & Basketball"	Danny Kallis	Danny Kallis & Jim Geoghan	January 1, 2006	120	4.2
23	23	"Pilot Your Own Life"	Lex Passaris	Danny Kallis & Jim Geoghan	January 6, 2006	118	N/A
24	24	"Crushed"	Rich Correll	Pamela Eells O'Connell & Adam Lapidus	January 13, 2006	121	N/A
25	25	"Commercial Breaks"	Rich Correll	Danny Kallis	January 20, 2006	126	4.78
26	26	"Boston Holiday"	Lex Passaris	Pamela Eells O'Connell	January 27, 2006	124	3.85

=== Season 2 (2006–07) ===
No. overall	No. in season	Title	Directed by	Written by	Original release date	Prod. code	Viewers (millions)
27	1	"Odd Couples"	Danny Kallis	Adam Lapidus	February 3, 2006	203	N/A
28	2	"French 101"	Rich Correll	Jim Geoghan	February 10, 2006	201	N/A
29	3	"Day Care"	Jim Drake	Jeff Hodsden	February 17, 2006	204	N/A
30	4	"Heck's Kitchen"	Rich Correll	Pamela Eells O'Connell	February 24, 2006	207	N/A
31	5	"Free Tippy"	Rich Correll	Jeny Quine	March 3, 2006	202	3.42
32	6	"Forever Plaid"	Jim Drake	Tim Pollock	March 20, 2006	205	4.12
33	7	"Election"	Rich Correll	Howard Nemetz	March 21, 2006	206	3.73
34	8	"Moseby's Big Brother"	Rich Correll	Howard Nemetz	March 22, 2006	212	N/A
35	9	"Books & Birdhouses"	Rich Correll	Jim Geoghan	March 23, 2006	214	3.80
36	10	"Not So Suite 16"	Rich Correll	Adam Lapidus	March 24, 2006	213	4.13
37	11	"Twins at the Tipton"	Rich Correll	Pamela Eells O'Connell	March 31, 2006	215	N/A
38	12	"Neither a Borrower Nor a Speller Bee"	Lex Passaris	Lloyd Garver	April 14, 2006	209	N/A
39	13	"Bowling"	Rich Correll	Danny Kallis	April 28, 2006	208	N/A
40	14	"A Kept Man"	Jim Drake	Jeff Hodsden & Tim Pollock	May 19, 2006	216	N/A
41	15	"The Suite Smell of Excess"	Kelly Sandefur	Billy Riback	June 2, 2006	210	4.32
42	16	"Going for the Gold"	Rich Correll	Adam Lapidus	June 10, 2006	221	N/A
43	17	"Boston Tea Party"	Rich Correll	Pamela Eells O'Connell	June 30, 2006	222	3.3
44	18	"Have a Nice Trip"	Rich Correll	Jeny Quine	July 7, 2006	219	3.6
45	19	"Ask Zack"	Eric Dean Seaton	Billy Riback	July 15, 2006	224	3.4
46	20	"That's So Suite Life of Hannah Montana" (Note: Part 2 of "That's So Suite Life of Hannah Montana")	Rich Correll	Howard Nemetz	July 28, 2006	218	6.99
47	21	"What the Hey?"	Lex Passaris	Danny Kallis	August 5, 2006	217	3.5
48	22	"A Midsummer's Nightmare"	Lex Passaris	Jeny Quine	August 11, 2006 (Note: This episode was first released in Taking Over the Tipton DVD on July 18, 2006.)	211	N/A
49	23	"Lost in Translation"	Rich Correll	Danny Kallis	August 19, 2006	223	3.3
50	24	"Volley Dad"	Kelly Sandefur	Adam Lapidus	September 8, 2006	227	4.29
51	25	"Loosely Ballroom"	Rich Correll	Jeny Quine	September 22, 2006	225	4.42
52	26	"Scary Movie"	Rich Correll	Pamela Eells O'Connell	October 13, 2006	228	4.2
53	27	"Ah! Wilderness!"	Rich Correll	Danny Kallis & Jim Geoghan	November 10, 2006	230	3.15
54	28	"Birdman of Boston"	Rich Correll	Jim Geoghan	November 24, 2006	220	3.85
55	29	"Nurse Zack"	Rich Correll	Danny Kallis	December 8, 2006	229	3.42
56	30	"Club Twin"	Lex Passaris	Howard Nemetz	January 7, 2007	231	4.64
57	31	"Risk It All"	Rich Correll	Danny Kallis & Jim Geoghan	January 27, 2007	234	3.84
58	32	"A Nugget of History"	Danny Kallis	Dan Signer	February 23, 2007	236	3.54
59	33	"Miniature Golf"	Jim Drake	Jeny Quine	March 2, 2007	232	3.99
60	34	"Health and Fitness"	Rich Correll	Howard Nemetz	March 16, 2007 (Note: This episode was first released in That's So Suite Life of Hannah Montana DVD on January 16, 2007.)	226	2.9
61	35	"Back in the Game"	Rich Correll	Pamela Eells O'Connell & Adam Lapidus	April 6, 2007	237	N/A
62	36	"The Suite Life Goes Hollywood, Part 1"	Rich Correll	Danny Kallis & Jim Geoghan	April 20, 2007	238	4.04
63	37	"The Suite Life Goes Hollywood, Part 2"	Rich Correll	Danny Kallis & Jim Geoghan	April 20, 2007	239	4.90
64	38	"I Want My Mummy"	Phill Lewis	Pamela Eells O'Connell	May 18, 2007	235	N/A
65	39	"Aptitude"	Danny Kallis	Adam Lapidus	June 2, 2007	233	N/A

=== Season 3 (2007–08) ===
No. overall	No. in season	Title	Directed by	Written by	Original release date	Prod. code	Viewers (millions)
66	1	"Graduation"	Rich Correll	Danny Kallis & Adam Lapidus	June 23, 2007	303	N/A
67	2	"Summer of Our Discontent"	Rich Correll	Jeny Quine & Dan Signer	June 30, 2007	301	3.1
68	3	"Sink or Swim"	Rich Correll	Jeny Quine & Dan Signer	July 8, 2007	305	3.7
69	4	"Super Twins"	Rich Correll	Jim Geoghan & Pamela Eells O'Connell	July 13, 2007	306	5.7
70	5	"Who's the Boss?"	Rich Correll	Danny Kallis & Adam Lapidus	July 22, 2007	302	4.1
71	6	"Baggage"	Rich Correll	Jim Geoghan & Pamela Eells O'Connell	July 22, 2007	304	5.1
72	7	"Sleepover Suite"	Danny Kallis	Adam Lapidus	July 28, 2007	307	N/A
73	8	"The Arwin That Came to Dinner"	Rich Correll	Jeny Quine	August 5, 2007	308	N/A
74	9	"Lip Synchin' in the Rain"	Rich Correll	Danny Kallis & Dan Signer	August 12, 2007	318	4.8
75	10	"First Day of High School"	Lex Passaris	Howard Nemetz	August 26, 2007	310	4.2
76	11	"Of Clocks and Contracts"	Rich Correll	Tim Pollock	September 15, 2007	309	N/A
77	12	"Arwinstein"	Rich Correll	Pamela Eells O'Connell	October 6, 2007	313	N/A
78	13	"Team Tipton"	Rich Correll	Howard Nemetz	October 27, 2007	312	3.3
79	14	"Orchestra"	Rich Correll	Jeff Hodsden	November 10, 2007	311	4.4
80	15	"A Tale of Two Houses"	Rich Correll	Jim Geoghan	November 17, 2007	314	N/A
81	16	"Tiptonline"	Rich Correll	Dan Signer	December 15, 2007	315	N/A
82	17	"Foiled Again"	Danny Kallis	Billy Riback	February 1, 2008	319	3.8
83	18	"Romancing the Phone"	Rich Correll	Danny Kallis & Pamela Eells O'Connell	April 19, 2008	317	N/A
84	19	"Benchwarmers"	Jim Drake	Danny Kallis	July 19, 2008	316	N/A
85	20	"Doin' Time in Suite 2330"	Rich Correll	Jeny Quine & Adam Lapidus	August 9, 2008	320	N/A
86	21	"Let Us Entertain You"	Rich Correll	Danny Kallis & Pamela Eells O'Connell	August 16, 2008	321	N/A
87	22	"Mr. Tipton Comes to Visit"	Lex Passaris	Jim Geoghan	September 1, 2008	322	N/A

== See also ==
- List of The Suite Life on Deck episodes
- List of That's So Raven episodes - includes "Checkin' Out", part one of 'That's So Suite Life of Hannah Montana' crossover
- List of Hannah Montana episodes - includes "On the Road Again", part three of 'That's So Suite Life of Hannah Montana' crossover
