= Adam I. Lapidus =

American television writer (born 1963)

Adam I. Lapidus is an American television writer, whose credits include Phil of the Future, Full House, Smart Guy, Jessie, Bunk'd, The Suite Life of Zack & Cody, The Suite Life on Deck and the season four Simpsons episode, "The Front". On the audio commentary, he commented that he uses the "I" when using his full name because he was trying to imitate James L. Brooks, another Simpsons writer whom Lapidus admired.

== Writing credits ==
=== Bunk'd episodes ===
- "Friending with the Enemy"
- "For Love and Money"
- "Xander Says Goodbye"
- "Luke Out Below"
- "Food Fight"
- "The Great Escape"
- "We Can't Bear It!" (with Pamela Eells O'Connell)
- "Finders Keepers, Lou's a Weeper"
- "Game of Totems"
- "Up, Up and Away" (with Pamela Eells O'Connell)

=== Jessie episodes ===
- "Zombie Tea Party 5"
- "Take The A-Train I Think"
- "Evil Times Two"
- "Creepy Connie's Curtain Call"
- "Say Yes to the Messy Dress"
- "Jessie's Big Break"
- "Pain in the Rear Window"
- "Diary of a Mad Newswomen"
- "The Rosses Get Real"
- "Lights, Camera, Distraction!"
- "Spaced Out"
- "No Money, Mo' Problems"
- "Karate Kid-tastrophe"
- "Basket Cases"
- "Katch Kipling"

=== Phil of the Future episodes ===
- "Future Jock"
- "Daddie Dearest"

=== The Simpsons episodes ===
- "The Front" (1993)

=== The Suite Life of Zack and Cody episodes ===
- "The Prince and The Plunger"
- "Cookin' With Romeo and Juliet" (with Jeny Quine)
- "Smart and Smarterer" (with Danny Kallis)
- "Crushed" (with Pamela Eells O'Connell)
- "Odd Couples"
- "Not So Suite 16"
- "Going for the Gold"
- "Volley Dad"
- "Back in the Game" (with Pamela Eells O'Connell)
- "Aptitude"
- "Graduation" (with Danny Kallis)
- "Who's the Boss?" (with Danny Kallis)
- "Sleepover Suite"
- "Doin' Time in Suite 2330" (with Jeny Quine)

=== The Suite Life on Deck episodes ===
- "Broke 'N' Yo-Yo" (with Jeny Quine)
- "Sea Monster Mash"
- "The Wrong Stuff" (with Jeny Quine)
- "Smarticle Particles"
- "Bermuda Triangle" (with Jeny Quine)
- "Can You Dig It?" (with Jeny Quine)
- "Rock the Kasbah"
- "I Brake for Whales" (with Jeny Quine)
- "Mean Chicks"
- "Breakup in Paris" (with Pamela Eells O'Connell)
- "Bon Voyage"
- "The Ghost and Mr. Martin" (with Jeny Quine)
- "Twister: Part 1"
- "Snakes on a Boat" (with Dan Signer)

=== Xiaolin Showdown episode ===
- "The Emperor Scorpion Strikes Back"
