= Jim Geoghan =

American television producer and writer (1947–2026)

- Born: July 5, 1947; The Bronx, New York City, U.S.
- Died: September 6, 2026 (aged 79); Los Angeles, California, U.S.
- Education: New York Institute of Technology
- Occupations: Producer; screenwriter
- Years active: 1973–2026

Jim Geoghan (/ˈɡeɪɡən/ GAY-gən; July 5, 1947 – September 6, 2026) was an American television producer and writer who co-created and executive produced Disney Channel's The Suite Life of Zack & Cody and its spin-off The Suite Life on Deck.

== Early life and career ==
Geoghan was born on July 5, 1947, in the Bronx, New York City, and was raised there during his childhood. Geoghan was the child of Irish Catholic parents. After attending New York Institute of Technology, Geoghan was involved as a volunteer reader for the blind at the Lighthouse in Manhattan, an experience which would figure prominently in one of his plays, for more than 20 years.

== Personal life and death ==
Geoghan was married to actress Ruth Ann Poons, known professionally as Annie Gagen.

Geoghan died from dementia at his home in Los Angeles, California, on September 6, 2026, at the age of 79. His daughter Genevieve Geoghan announced his death two days later.
