= The Suite Life of Zack & Cody =

American teen sitcom (2005–2008)

- Genre: Teen sitcom
- Created by: Danny Kallis & Jim Geoghan
- Showrunner: Danny Kallis
- Starring: Cole Sprouse; Dylan Sprouse; Brenda Song; Ashley Tisdale; Phill Lewis; Kim Rhodes
- Theme music composer: Gary Scott (music); John Adair and Steve Hampton (lyrics)
- Opening theme: "Here I Am" performed by Drew Davis Band
- Ending theme: "Here I Am" (Instrumental)
- Composer: Gary S. Scott
- Country of origin: United States
- Original language: English
- No. of seasons: 3
- No. of episodes: 87 (list of episodes)

Production
- Executive producers: Danny Kallis; Irene Dreayer; Pamela Eells O'Connell (seasons 2–3); Jim Geoghan (season 3)
- Producer: Walter Barnett
- Cinematography: Alan Keath Walker
- Editors: Kelly Sandefur; Jim Miley
- Running time: 22–23 minutes
- Production company: It's a Laugh Productions (seasons 2–3)

Original release
- Network: Disney Channel
- Release: March 18, 2005 – September 1, 2008

Related
- The Suite Life on Deck (2008–11); The Suite Life of Karan & Kabir (2012–13)

The Suite Life of Zack & Cody is an American teen sitcom created by Danny Kallis and Jim Geoghan that aired on Disney Channel from March 18, 2005, to September 1, 2008. The series was nominated twice for the Primetime Emmy Award for Outstanding Children's Program.

The series is primarily set at the Tipton Hotel in Boston and centers on Zack and Cody Martin (Dylan and Cole Sprouse), a set of twin brothers who live in the hotel's suite. The series' other main characters include the Tipton hotel's heiress London Tipton (Brenda Song), the hotel's candy counter girl Maddie Fitzpatrick (Ashley Tisdale), the manager, Mr. Marion Moseby (Phill Lewis), and the boys' single mother who is also the Hotel's lounge singer, Carey Martin (Kim Rhodes). The series is the third Disney Channel Original to have more than 65 episodes, after That's So Raven and Kim Possible.

The Suite Life launched a sequel series, also starring the Sprouse twins in their respective roles as Zack and Cody, called The Suite Life on Deck, which aired on Disney Channel for a further three seasons from 2008 to 2011. A television film based on both series, The Suite Life Movie, premiered on Disney Channel on March 25, 2011.

== Premise ==
The series centers on Zack and Cody Martin, 12-year-old twin brothers who live in the luxurious Tipton Hotel in Boston, where their divorced mother Carey sings and performs in the hotel lounge. The identical twins often cause mischief at their residence. The series also follows the hotel owner's teenage daughter London Tipton (a parody of Paris Hilton), the hotel's candy-counter girl, Maddie Fitzpatrick, and Mr. Moseby, the hotel manager, who is often the foil to Zack and Cody's schemes.

The show is often set at the Tipton Hotel, but has other settings such as Zack and Cody's school, Cheevers High, and Maddie and London's private Catholic school, Our Lady of Perpetual Sorrow. Zack and Cody often get in trouble and come up with ideas to get out of it. In the 3rd season, the show is also set at the store Zack and Cody work for: Paul Revere Mini Mart, and the camp that Maddie works for: Camp Heaven on Earth.

== Characters ==
=== Main ===
- Cody Martin (Cole Sprouse), the more mature, gentle and smarter younger twin compared to his brother. He is a "straight A" student and somehow always gets talked into going along with Zack's schemes.
- Zack Martin (Dylan Sprouse), the self-centered, outgoing older twin, who usually dresses in skater and baggy-camo clothes.
- London Tipton (Brenda Song), the only daughter of Wilfred Tipton, the owner of the Tipton Hotel. London is a teenager with her own private suite at the Tipton Hotel in Boston. London loves fashion; she only wears designer clothes. She has her own web show called Yay Me! Starring London Tipton.
- Maddie Fitzpatrick (Ashley Tisdale), the teenage candy-counter girl at the Tipton Hotel and London's best friend. She comes from a lower-class family, and as such Maddie is hard-working, outspoken, and intelligent.
- Marion Moseby (Phill Lewis), the stern and uptight manager of the Tipton Hotel, who speaks with a large vocabulary and an urbane vernacular, and is often annoyed by Zack's and Cody's schemes. Mr. Moseby acts as a father figure towards London, as Mr. Tipton is seldom around.
- Carey Martin (Kim Rhodes), the single working mother of Zack and Cody. She is the hotel's lounge singer. She and her sons traveled to several cities before arriving at the Boston Tipton Hotel. She was married to Kurt Martin, but they divorced after the twins were born for unstated reasons.

=== Recurring ===
- Esteban Ramírez (Adrian R'Mante), the hotel's bellhop.
- Arwin Hochhauser (Brian Stepanek), the hotel's janitor and aspiring inventor.

== Production ==
Characters, bottom row (from left to right): Carey Martin, London Tipton, Maddie Fitzpatrick and Mr. Moseby. Top row (from left to right): Arwin Hawkhauser, Zack Martin, Cody Martin and Esteban Ramirez.

The Suite Life of Zack & Cody premiered in March 2005, starring Dylan and Cole Sprouse, Brenda Song, Ashley Tisdale, Phill Lewis and Kim Rhodes. President of Disney Channels Worldwide Gary Marsh described the actors as an ensemble cast. The series was filmed in front of a live studio audience in Hollywood. This was the first series to be produced under the It's a Laugh Productions banner, and it was created by Danny Kallis and Jim Geoghan.

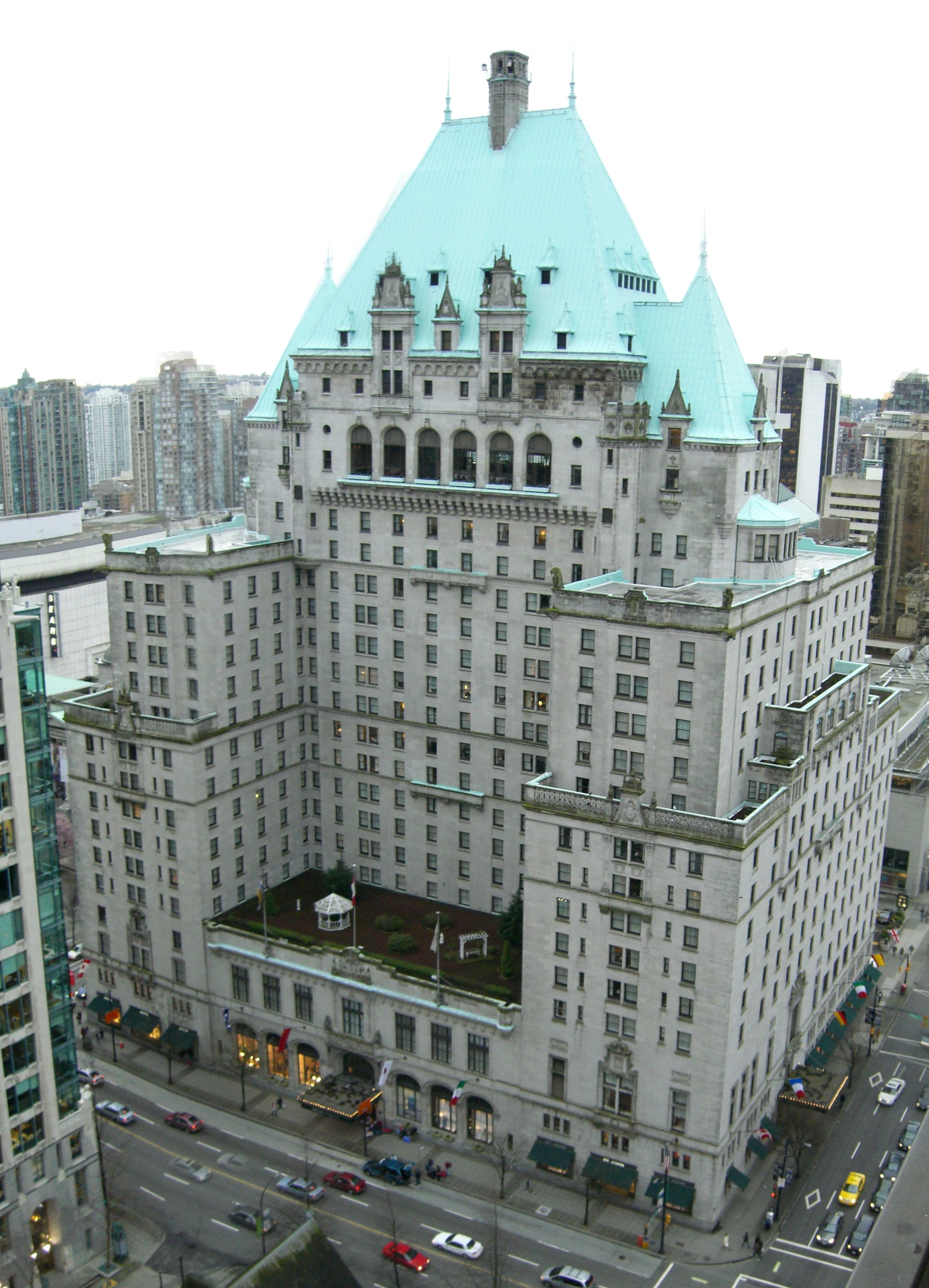
The Fairmont Hotel Vancouver

The exterior of the Tipton Hotel seen in the series is the Fairmont Hotel Vancouver in downtown Vancouver, while interior scenes were filmed at Hollywood Center Studios in Los Angeles.

During the production of the first season, five additional episodes were ordered, bringing the total to 26.

The series was renewed for a third season in November 2006, after 65 episodes had already been completed. Production was scheduled to resume in January 2007.

== Series overview ==
Season	Episodes	Originally released	
Season	Episodes	First released	Last released
1	26	March 18, 2005	January 27, 2006
2	39	February 3, 2006	June 2, 2007
3	22	June 23, 2007	September 1, 2008

The series filmed an episode which aired as part of network crossover special, That's So Suite Life of Hannah Montana, which aired on July 28, 2006, as a crossover featuring That's So Raven and Hannah Montana.

== Reception ==
By 2006, The Suite Life of Zack & Cody was one of Disney Channel's top-rated programs.

=== Accolades ===
Year	Award	Category	Recipient	Result	Ref.
2006	Asian Excellence Awards	Outstanding Newcomer Award	Brenda Song	Nominated	
2006	Primetime Emmy Awards	Outstanding Choreography	Travis Payne (Episode: Commercial Breaks)	Nominated	
2006	Young Artist Awards	Best Performance in a TV Series (Comedy or Drama) – Leading Young Actor	Dylan and Cole Sprouse	Nominated	
2006	Young Hollywood Awards	Superstar of Tomorrow	Brenda Song	Won	
2006	Young Hollywood Awards	Role Model Award	Brenda Song	Won	
2007	Kids' Choice Awards	Favorite TV Show	The Suite Life of Zack & Cody	Nominated	
2007	Kids' Choice Awards	Favorite TV Actor	Cole Sprouse	Nominated	
2007	Primetime Emmy Awards	Outstanding Children's Program	Danny Kallis, Irene Dreayer, Pamela Eells O'Connell, Jim Geoghan, and Walter Barnett	Nominated	
2007	Young Artist Awards	Best Family Television Series (Comedy)	The Suite Life of Zack & Cody	Won	
2007	Young Artist Awards	Best Performance in a TV Series (Comedy or Drama) – Leading Young Actor	Cole Sprouse	Nominated	
2007	Young Artist Awards	Best Performance in a TV Series (Comedy or Drama) – Leading Young Actor	Dylan Sprouse	Nominated	
2007	Young Artist Awards	Best Performance in a TV Series (Comedy or Drama) – Recurring Young Actor	Charley Stewart	Nominated	
2007	Young Artist Awards	Best Performance in a TV Series (Comedy or Drama) – Recurring Young Actress	Sophie Oda	Nominated	
2007	Young Artist Awards	Best Performance in a TV Series (Comedy or Drama) – Guest Starring Young Actress	Sammi Hanratty	Nominated	
2007	Young Artist Awards	Best Performance in a TV Series (Comedy or Drama) – Guest Starring Young Actress	Monet Monico	Won	
2007	Young Artist Awards	Best Performance in a TV Series (Comedy or Drama) – Guest Starring Young Actress	Alyson Stoner	Nominated	
2008	Australian Kids' Choice Awards	Fave International TV Star	Ashley Tisdale	Nominated	
2008	Kids' Choice Awards	Favorite TV Show	The Suite Life of Zack & Cody	Nominated	
2008	Kids' Choice Awards	Favorite TV Actor	Cole Sprouse	Nominated	
2008	Kids' Choice Awards	Favorite TV Actor	Dylan Sprouse	Nominated	
2008	Primetime Emmy Awards	Outstanding Children's Program	Danny Kallis, Irene Dreayer, Pamela Eells O'Connell, Jim Geoghan, and Walter Barnett	Nominated	
2008	UK Kids' Choice Awards	Favorite Kids' TV Show	The Suite Life of Zack & Cody	Nominated	
2008	UK Kids' Choice Awards	Favorite Male TV Star	Dylan Sprouse	Nominated	
2008	Young Artist Awards	Best Performance in a TV Series – Recurring Young Actress	Sammi Hanratty	Nominated	
2008	Young Artist Awards	Best Performance in a TV Series – Recurring Young Actress	Alyson Stoner	Nominated	
2009	Crown Awards	Best Hairstyle on Television	Brenda Song	Won	
2009	Kids' Choice Awards	Favorite TV Show	The Suite Life of Zack & Cody	Nominated	
2009	Kids' Choice Awards	Favorite TV Actor	Cole Sprouse	Nominated	
2009	Kids' Choice Awards	Favorite TV Actor	Dylan Sprouse	Won	
2009	Young Artist Awards	Best Performance in a TV series – Guest Starring Young Actor	Hunter Gomez	Nominated	

== Other media ==
=== Television series ===
The Suite Life on Deck is a sequel series to The Suite Life of Zack & Cody, that debuted on Disney Channel on September 26, 2008. The series is on a cruise ship with Zack, Cody, and London attending a semester-at-sea program, while Mr. Moseby manages the ship. Dylan and Cole Sprouse, Brenda Song, and Phill Lewis returned to reprise their roles in the main cast. Debby Ryan joins the cast as Bailey Pickett, who becomes Zack and Cody's friend (and Cody's girlfriend) and London's friend and roommate. The series also introduces Doc Shaw as Marcus Little, a former superstar who lost his fame after his voice changed. While an attempted spin-off, Arwin!, which was to star Selena Gomez and Brian Stepanek, was not picked up by Disney Channel, The Suite Life on Deck skipped the pilot process and went straight to the series. The Suite Life on Deck eventually ended on May 6, 2011.

An Indian adaptation of the show, titled The Suite Life of Karan & Kabir, premiered on Disney Channel India on April 8, 2012. It ran for two seasons and ended on January 19, 2014.

=== Film ===
On September 20, 2010, Disney Channel announced that production has begun for a Disney Channel Original Movie based on The Suite Life of Zack & Cody and The Suite Life on Deck. The Suite Life Movie premiered on Disney Channel in the United States and Canada on March 25, 2011.

=== Home media ===
DVD Name	Release date	Episodes featured	Special features
Taking Over The Tipton	July 18, 2006 (US) April 21, 2008 (UK)	"Rock Star in the House"; "Kisses & Basketball"; "Odd Couples"; "French 101"	Behind-the-scenes featurette; Bonus episode: "A Midsummer's Nightmare"
That's So Suite Life of Hannah Montana	January 16, 2007 (US) April 21, 2008 (UK)	"That's So Raven: Checkin' Out"; "The Suite Life of Zack & Cody: That's So Suite Life of Hannah Montana"; "Hannah Montana: On the Road Again"	"So You Think You Know Raven Volume 2" DVD Game; Rockin' Hannah Montana Music Video; Bonus Episode Of The Suite Life of Zack & Cody: "Heath and Fitness"
Sweet Suite Victory	August 7, 2007 (US) September 1, 2008 (UK)	"Band In Boston"; "Election"; "Not So Suite 16"	Gag Reel; The Suite Life's Sweet Lift Challenge: Set-Top Trivia Game
Wish Gone Amiss	November 27, 2007 (US) September 1, 2008 (UK)	"Gone Wishin'" (Cory in the House); "Super Twins" (The Suite Life of Zack & Cody); "When You Wish You Were the Star" (Hannah Montana)	"I Wish I May, I Wish I Might: A Guide to Making Wishes" hosted by Jason Earles of Hannah Montana.
Lip Synchin' In The Rain	June 17, 2008 (US)	"Lip Synchin' In The Rain"; "The Arwin That Came To Dinner"; "A Tale Of Two Houses"; "Orchestra"	Twin-Tastic featurette; Gag Reel

=== Video games ===
The series has spawned three video games entitled The Suite Life of Zack & Cody: Tipton Caper for the Game Boy Advance, The Suite Life of Zack & Cody: Tipton Trouble, and The Suite Life of Zack & Cody: Circle of Spies for the Nintendo DS. They were developed by Artificial Mind and Movement and published by Buena Vista Games, with the exception of Circle of Spies, which was published by Disney Interactive Studios.

=== Books ===
Five novels adapting episodes of the series were published between May 2006 and January 2007. A film comic adapting several episodes was released under Tokyopop's Cine-manga brand in July 2007.
