= List of Charles in Charge episodes =

Charles in Charge is an American situation comedy television series created by Michael Jacobs and Barbara Weisberg. Charles in Charge follows Charles (Scott Baio), a college student working as a live-in babysitter. In the first season, Charles worked for the Pembroke family. In the second season, the Pembrokes sublet their house to the Powell family, for whom Charles then worked in the remaining seasons.

It premiered on October 3, 1984 and ended on November 10, 1990, with a total of 126 episodes over the course of five seasons. The first season originally aired on CBS from 1984 to 1985 and the remaining seasons originally aired in syndication from 1987 to 1990. All five seasons are available on DVD.

== Series overview ==
Season	Episodes	Originally released		
Season	Episodes	First released	Last released	Network
1	22	October 3, 1984	April 3, 1985	CBS
2	26	January 3, 1987	June 27, 1987	Syndication
3	26	December 26, 1987	June 18, 1988	Syndication
4	26	December 31, 1988	November 18, 1989	Syndication
5	26	December 30, 1989	November 10, 1990	Syndication

== Episodes ==
=== Season 1 (1984–85) ===
No. overall	No. in season	Title	Directed by	Written by	Original release date	Prod. code
1	1	"Pilot"	Alan Rafkin	Michael Jacobs	October 3, 1984	83510
Charles has a date with Gwendolyn Pierce on the same night he has to watch the Pembroke children.
2	2	"Extracurricular Activity"	Tony Singletary	Michael Jacobs	October 10, 1984	59302
When Charles encourages the Pembroke siblings to find and join clubs at school, Lila establishes herself as a top candidate for the worst cheerleader in history. Gymnastics legend Julianne McNamara guest stars.
3	3	"Another Saturday Night"	Tony Singletary	Michael Jacobs	October 17, 1984	59304
Buddy and Gwendolyn argue over Charles' Saturday night.
4	4	"War"	Lee Lochhead	Judy Pioli & Marc Sotkin	October 24, 1984	59311
Charles shows a young woman, Megan Harper, (Meg Ryan) what it is like to take care of children every day, and kisses her, as well. However, Douglas and Jason declaring war on each other makes thing complex.
5	5	"Cousin Elliott"	Alan Rafkin	Mike Reiss & Al Jean	November 7, 1984	59303
The Pembrokes' cousin Elliot (Jerry Levine) arrives, and Charles must keep them out of trouble.
6	6	"Slumber Party"	Alan Rafkin	Pamela Pettler	November 14, 1984	59301
Charles wants to escape from women for one night, but Lila has her friends over for a slumber party.
7	7	"Discipline"	Alan Rafkin	Michael Jacobs	November 21, 1984	59336
Charles has to go to the school and talk to Douglas' teacher about Douglas' failing grade.
8	8	"Trick or Treat"	Alan Rafkin	Michael Jacobs	November 28, 1984	59316
On Halloween, Charles helps Buddy prepare for a date by finding out what she likes.
9	9	"A Date with Enid"	Alan Rafkin	Michael Jacobs & Pamela Pettler	December 5, 1984	59318
Douglas falls in love with Lila's friend, Enid (Mandy Ingber).
10	10	"Friends and Lovers"	Alan Rafkin	Judy Pioli & Marc Sotkin	December 12, 1984	59308
Charles and Gwendolyn decide to see other people, but Charles gets jealous when Gwendolyn makes a date with another man.
11	11	"Home for the Holidays"	Alan Rafkin	Michael Jacobs	December 19, 1984	59319
Mr. Pembroke's mother visits the family for Christmas (Rue McClanahan), but she does not like how the children like Charles.
12	12	"Accidental Puppy"	Alan Rafkin	Judy Pioli & Marc Sotkin	December 26, 1984	59324
Charles wins two tickets to a Bruce Springsteen concert and must decide whether to take Buddy or Gwendolyn. Meanwhile, Jason and Douglas bring home a puppy that they want to keep.
13	13	"The Commotion"	Alan Rafkin	George Tibbles	January 2, 1985	59325
Charles is unable to do his schoolwork because of distractions in the house.
14	14	"Mr. President"	Alan Rafkin	Larry Balmagia	January 16, 1985	59328
Cousin Eliot runs for class president, and Gwendolyn convinces Charles to run against him.
15	15	"Jill's Decision"	Alan Rafkin	Judy Pioli & Marc Sotkin	January 23, 1985	59329
Mrs. Pembroke gets a promotion that means longer hours at work for her and more responsibilities at home for Charles.
16	16	"Pressure from Grandma"	Alan Rafkin	Marc Sotkin	January 30, 1985	59327
Grandma Irene visits and offers Charles another job.
17	17	"Snowed In"	Alan Rafkin	Jeffrey Ferro & Fredric Weiss	February 6, 1985	59330
A blizzard traps Charles in the house with the children and a group of Lila's friends. Christina Applegate plays one of Lila's friends.
18	18	"Charles 'R' Us"	Alan Rafkin	Michael Jacobs	February 13, 1985	59331
Charles and Buddy start a business to recruit household helpers. Megan Harper (Meg Ryan) reappears as a potential helper.
19	19	"Charles' Spring Break"	Alan Rafkin	Judy Pioli & Marc Sotkin	February 20, 1985	59332
Everything goes wrong for Charles, Buddy, and Gwendolyn on their trip to Florida for spring break.
20	20	"The Wrong Guy"	Alan Rafkin	Jeffrey Ferro & Fredric Weiss	February 27, 1985	59333
Against her parents' orders, Lila goes out with a boy (Gary Riley) whom Jill and Stan detest...and who proves to be even worse than her dad and mom anticipate. Meanwhile, Douglas is kissed by a girl and wonders how to respond. Matthew Perry guest stars in this episode.
21	21	"Mr. Brilliant"	Alan Rafkin	Pamela Pettler	March 13, 1985	59326
Charles invites Mrs. Pembroke's old friend over for dinner.
22	22	"Meet Grandpa"	Alan Rafkin	Judy Pioli	April 3, 1985	59334
Grandpa Harry (Dick O'Neill) visits the house unexpectedly.

=== Season 2 (1987) ===
No. overall	No. in season	Title	Directed by	Written by	Original release date	Prod. code
23	1	"Amityville"	Phil Ramuno	Michael Jacobs	January 3, 1987	78009
After returning from a trip, Charles finds that the Pembrokes are moving and a new family, the Powells, are living there. Guest stars include Karen Mistal as Heidi, Michael Pearlman as Jason Pembroke, Lisa Donovan as Jill Pembroke, Tammi Caudell as Patti, and Jeff Robie as Sid.
24	2	"The Naked Truth"	Bob Claver	Seth Weisbond	January 10, 1987	78001
Charles and Buddy take Adam to their art class, where Professor Wycliffe (Jack Fletcher) mistakes Adam for a young art prodigy; Buddy ends up meeting a girl named Rebecca Stansbury (Signy Coleman) who poses nude for art class.
25	3	"Feud for Thought"	Phil Ramuno	Kathy Greer & Bill Greer	January 17, 1987	78026
Adam becomes the target of a bully, and Charles tries to help. Guest stars are Lisa Aliff as Gina, Robert Costanzo as Hank Holloway, and Mark Venturini as Herman Holloway.
26	4	"The Egg and Us"	Bob Claver	Mitzi McCall-Brill & Adrienne Armstrong	January 24, 1987	78017
Jamie and Sarah take care of eggs for their school project; Walter's old friend Gloria (Betsy Palmer) comes to visit him and Walter finds out she is Buddy's grandmother.
27	5	"The Loan Arranger"	Bob Claver	Chuck Lorre	January 31, 1987	78024
Charles must talk to a loan officer named Stanley Willard (Ben Stein) when he loses his student loan because of bad grades.
28	6	"American Teen"	Phil Ramuno	David Wechter	February 7, 1987	78019
Charles tries to convince Sarah to submit an essay she wrote to American Teen magazine; Adam gets the family involved in a jigsaw puzzle. Guest stars are Nikolette Scorsese as Louise, Julianne McNamara as Paula Thackery, and Jeff Robie as Sid.
29	7	"Buddy Comes to Dinner"	John Robins	Story by : Mitchell Bank; Teleplay by : Marcy Vosburgh & Sandy Sprung	February 14, 1987	78025
Buddy gets injured at dinner, and Charles must take care of him; Jamie tries to teach Sarah the rules of dating, but instead gets taught a lesson. Guest star is Maylo McCaslin as Lauren Andrews.
30	8	"A Fox in the Henhouse"	Zane Buzby	Chuck Lorre	February 21, 1987	78012
Lt. Matty Whitford (Stephen Parr), a shipmate of deployed Commander Powell's, visits Mrs. Powell, but he wants more than her company; Charles and Walter try to combine their food recipes and end up getting sick from them.
31	9	"Pizza Parlor Protest"	Lee Miller	Story by : Pamela Eells & Maxine Lapiduss; Teleplay by : Sally Lapiduss & Maxine Lapiduss	February 28, 1987	78018
Charles' college plans to turn Sid's Pizza Parlor into a parking lot. Guest stars are James Karen as Harrison Bartlett/Hamburger Harry and Jeff Robie as Sid.
32	10	"Trade Off"	Phil Ramuno	Jim Fisher & Jim Staahl	March 7, 1987	78021
The Powell family tries bartering for the things they want.
33	11	"Dating"	Phil Ramuno	David Rimmer & Ellen Sandhaus	March 14, 1987	78005
Dating causes problems for Charles and the family.
34	12	"Music, Music, Mayhem"	Phil Ramuno	Joan Brooker & Nancy Eddo	March 21, 1987	78029
Charles buys Buddy's old cassette player, which ends up destroying Walter's tape and causes problems between Buddy and Charles. Guest star is Julianne McNamara as Paula Thackery.
35	13	"Buddy in Charge"	Scott Baio & Madeline Rae Cripe	Story by : Bob Underwood; Teleplay by : Kathy Greer & Bill Greer	March 28, 1987	78033
Buddy takes care of the children. Te guest star is Susan Ursitti as Debbie.
36	14	"Isn't That What's Her Face?"	Zane Buzby	Mitzi McCall-Brill & Adrienne Armstrong	April 4, 1987	78032
A famous movie star asks Charles to keep her secret that she is going to Copeland College.
37	15	"A Date from Heck"	Phil Ramuno	Alan Moskowitz	April 11, 1987	78023
Charles has a date with a woman (Diane Franklin)... and her family.
38	16	"Mama Mia"	Jules Lichtman	Bill Greer & Kathy Greer	April 18, 1987	78036
Lillian (Ellen Travolta), Charles' mother, visits and takes care of the children.
39	17	"Weekend Weary"	Judi Elterman	Jim Parker	April 25, 1987	78031
Mrs. Powell makes Charles take a weekend off.
40	18	"U.F. Oh No!"	Phil Ramuno	Lee Aronsohn & Marc Sheffler	May 2, 1987	78001
Charles and the family have a UFO sighting.
41	19	"The Case of the Mock-Turtle Mystery"	Jules Lichtman	Leslie Fuller	May 9, 1987	78020
Charles defends Adam, who is accused killing Sarah's turtle.
42	20	"Twice Upon a Time: Part 1"	Scott Baio	Story by : Mitchell Bank; Teleplay by : Kathy Greer & Bill Greer	May 16, 1987	78041
Gwendolyn Pierce, Charles' first love, returns.
43	21	"Twice Upon a Time: Part 2"	Madeline Rae Cripe	Story by : Mitchell Bank; Teleplay by : Kathy Greer & Bill Greer	May 23, 1987	78042
Charles and Gwendolyn get engaged.
44	22	"A Job from Heck"	Jules Lichtman	Alan Moskowitz	May 30, 1987	78027
Jamie gets a job as a waitress at Sid's Pizza Parlor.
45	23	"Baby Doll"	Zane Buzby	Kathy Greer & Bill Greer	June 6, 1987	78039
Sid's Pizza Parlor is getting a new chef, and Charles needs help promoting the introduction party.
46	24	"Lillian Putts a Round"	Phil Ramuno	Mitzi McCall-Brill & Adrienne Armstrong	June 13, 1987	78004
Charles' widowed mother meets a man (Hank Brandt) at a golf club.
47	25	"Her Brother's Keeper"	Thomas Klein	Story by : Seth Weisbord; Teleplay by : Kathy Greer & Bill Greer	June 20, 1987	78003
Charles and Buddy help the shy brother of a woman Charles likes.
48	26	"The Undergraduate"	Phil Ramuno	Lee Aronsohn & Marc Sheffler	June 27, 1987	78034
Mrs. Powell's married cousin (Kay Lenz) wants Charles.

=== Season 3 (1987–88) ===
No. overall	No. in season	Title	Directed by	Written by	Original release date	Prod. code
49	1	"Yule Laff"	Bob Claver	Kathy Greer & Bill Greer	December 26, 1987	78057
A snowstorm traps Charles and the Powell family in a cabin on Christmas.
50	2	"Piece of Cake"	Bob Claver	Lee Aronsohn & Marc Sheffler	January 2, 1988	78040
Charles prepares for an upcoming visit from Commander Powell.
51	3	"Dorm Warnings"	Scott Baio	John Vorhaus	January 9, 1988	78045
The Powell family thinks Charles wants to move out of the house.
52	4	"Speechless"	Phil Ramuno	Harvey Silberman	January 16, 1988	78022
Buddy loses his voice, and Charles must overcome his fear to give a speech.
53	5	"Infatuation"	Bob Claver	Anita Doohan	January 23, 1988	78037
Charles has a crush on a model.
54	6	"Role Model"	Bob Claver	Kathy Greer & Bill Greer & Mitzi McCall-Brill & Adrienne Armstrong	January 30, 1988	78043
Jamie enrolls at a modeling school.
55	7	"The Extremely Odd Couple"	Zane Buzby	Lee Aronsohn & Marc Sheffler	February 6, 1988	78038
Walter and Lillian argue, and Charles is caught in the middle.
56	8	"Poppa, the Sailor Man"	Gary Brown	Kathy Greer & Bill Greer	February 13, 1988	78054
Walter's estranged father (Dabbs Greer) visits.
57	9	"Bottle Baby"	Scott Baio	Mitchell Bank	February 20, 1988	78053
Buddy's sister, Bunny (Mindy Cohn), visits, but he discovers that she is an alcoholic.
58	10	"Dear Charles"	Steve Robman	Kathy Greer & Bill Greer & Robert Schechter	February 27, 1988	78035
Charles becomes a newspaper advice columnist.
59	11	"The Pickle Plot"	Zane Buzby	Mitzi McCall-Brill & Adrienne Armstrong	March 5, 1988	78047
Charles' uncle (John Astin) tries to convince him to drop out of school and work for him.
60	12	"The Buddy System"	Madeline Rae Cripe	Mitzi McCall-Brill & Adrienne Armstrong	March 12, 1988	78050
After a self-help class, Buddy turns into a different person.
61	13	"Sarah, Steps Out"	Brian Levant	Lee Aronsohn & Marc Sheffler	March 19, 1988	78046
Charles and Buddy spy on Sarah's date (Scott Grimes).
62	14	"Trading Papers"	Zane Buzby	Adam I. Lapidus	March 26, 1988	78044
Charles and Sarah accidentally hand in each other's school assignments.
63	15	"Five Easy Pizzas"	Madeline Rae Cripe	Manny Basanese	April 2, 1988	78051
A food critic (Vito Scotti) visits the pizza parlor while Charles is managing the restaurant.
64	16	"Getting In"	Scott Baio & Madeline Rae Cripe	Kevin Parent & Myles Berkowitz	April 9, 1988	78013
Charles and Buddy pledge a fraternity.
65	17	"Hero Today, Gone Tomorrow"	Gary Brown	Donald Ross	April 16, 1988	78048
Charles and Buddy foil a robber at the pizza parlor.
66	18	"Dutiful Dreamer"	Scott Baio	Kathy Greer & Bill Greer	April 23, 1988	78061
Charles has a dream about the family's problems.
67	19	"Berkling Up Is Hard To Do"	Bonnie Franklin	Lee Aronsohn & Marc Sheffler	April 30, 1988	78049
Some well-intentioned advice causes misunderstandings.
68	20	"Runaround Charles"	Mary Lou Belli	Lee Aronsohn & Marc Sheffler	May 7, 1988	78058
Charles makes too many commitments for the same night.
69	21	"Where the Auction Is"	Scott Baio	Lee Aronsohn & Marc Sheffler	May 14, 1988	78059
The children buy Charles at a charity slave auction.
70	22	"The Boy Who Loved Women"	Bob Claver	Lee Aronsohn & Marc Sheffler	May 21, 1988	78056
Jamie and Sarah go out with the same boy.
71	23	"Barbelles"	Scott Baio	Kathy Greer & Bill Greer	May 28, 1988	78060
Charles is threatened by his date's ex-boyfriend.
72	24	"The Blackboard Bungle"	Scott Baio	Lee Aronsohn & Marc Sheffler	June 4, 1988	78052
Charles becomes a teacher's aide in Jamie's class.
73	25	"The Heart Burglar"	Madeline Cripe	John B. Collins & Bill Greer & Kathy Greer	June 11, 1988	78030
Buddy's girlfriend has feeling for Charles, which they hid from Buddy.
74	26	"May the Best Man Lose"	Pat Fischer-Doak	John Vorhaus	June 18, 1988	78055
Charles, Buddy, and the Powell children compete against each other in a school contest.

=== Season 4 (1988–89) ===
No. overall	No. in season	Title	Directed by	Written by	Original release date	Prod. code
75	1	"No Nukes Is Good Nukes"	Scott Baio	Lee Aronsohn	December 31, 1988	78408
While Commander Powell is home, Sarah is arrested for protesting the nuclear weapons on her father's ship.
76	2	"Ninny and the Professor"	Doug Rogers	Lee Aronsohn	January 7, 1989	78403
Charles' professor (Raf Mauro) disagrees with the grade he gives a student.
77	3	"Dueling Presleys"	Scott Baio	David Ankrum & Jack Lukes	January 14, 1989	78410
Lillian hires an Elvis impersonator for the diner.
78	4	"Adam See, Adam Do"	Norman Abbott	Lee Aronsohn	January 21, 1989	78416
Adam studies Charles' girlfriend (Erika Eleniak) and dating techniques.
79	5	"Yesterday Cafe"	Phil Ramuno	Kathy Greer & Bill Greer	January 28, 1989	78407
Lillian starts a 1950s-style restaurant called the "Yesterday Cafe". Meanwhile, Charles tutors a couple of football players for an upcoming test.
80	6	"Fatal Obsession"	Scott Baio	Steven Feld	February 4, 1989	78414
A woman at camp pursues Charles despite his having a girlfriend (Erika Eleniak). The Happy Days catch phrase "wa wa wa" makes a cameo appearance. A reference to the character Chachi is also made as a joke about Scott Baio.
81	7	"Walter Gets a Dodo"	Zane Buzby	Adrienne Armstrong	February 11, 1989	78411
Charles has to entertain his professor's sister (Marcia Wallace), and he sets her up with Walter.
82	8	"Ladies' Night Out"	Zane Buzby	Scott McGibbon	February 18, 1989	78412
Jamie and Sarah try to sneak out to go to a nightclub.
83	9	"Chargin' Charles"	Scott Baio	Jeff Strauss & Jeff Greenstein	February 25, 1989	78418
Charles cannot use his credit card because of the Powell children.
84	10	"A Fish Called Buddy"	Zane Buzby	Steven Baio	March 4, 1989	78413
Buddy goes to the hospital right after an argument with Charles.
85	11	"Second Banana"	Bob Claver	Bud Wiser	April 22, 1989	78424
Jamie thinks she will be in a commercial, but Sarah gets the part.
86	12	"Still at Large"	Dwayne Hickman	Efrem Seeger	April 29, 1989	78417
Charles and Buddy find out Jamie's teacher (Sally Struthers) is wanted by the FBI.
87	13	"Poetic License"	Scott Baio	Bruce Teicher & Janice Pieroni	May 6, 1989	78415
Charles uses one of Sarah's poems to impress a woman, who publishes it in a magazine under Charles' name.
88	14	"Charles Splits: Part 1"	Scott Baio	Jim Vallely & Ron Zimmerman	May 13, 1989	78427
When Charles bumps his head, he begins acting strangely and calls himself Chaz.
89	15	"Charles Splits: Part 2"	Christine Ballard	Jim Vallely & Ron Zimmerman	May 20, 1989	78428
Chaz gets married.
90	16	"Curing the Common Cult"	Scott Baio	Al Burton & Mitchell Bank	May 27, 1989	78423
Jamie joins a cult, and Charles must prove that the leader (Charles Nelson Reilly) is a fake.
91	17	"Room at the Bottom"	Phil Ramuno	Kathy Greer & Bill Greer	July 1, 1989	78406
Walter remodels the basement; Jamie wants her own room.
92	18	"A Sting of Pearls"	Mary Lou Belli	Adrienne Armstrong	July 8, 1989	78402
The Powells' old babysitter (Liz Keifer) comes back and tries to get Charles in trouble.
93	19	"Walter's War"	Bob Claver	Scott McGibbon	September 9, 1989	78425
Walter tries to impress a woman with war souvenirs.
94	20	"The Organization Man"	Zane Buzby	Bud Wiser	September 16, 1989	78432
Charles uses a digital organizer to plan his schedule.
95	21	"Big Bang"	Scott Baio	Ken Peragine & Howard Friedlander	September 23, 1989	78434
Charles writes an essay about childhood; Buddy does an experiment.
96	22	"Triple Threat"	Scott Baio	Al Burton & Mitchell Bank	September 30, 1989	78429
Charles and Buddy go out with identical twins, but they think they are dating the same girl.
97	23	"Aunt Vanessa"	Christine Ballard	Kathy Greer & Bill Greer	October 28, 1989	78426
Jamie wants to move to New York and live with Charles' aunt.
98	24	"It's a Blunderfull Life"	Scott Baio	Michael Manos & Jim Kelly	November 4, 1989	78409
Charles has a dream about life without him. Donny Most makes an appearance as a lottery winner, and makes a reference to Happy Days as a joke.
99	25	"Bad Boy"	Brian Levant	Bud Wiser	November 11, 1989	78430
Charles tutors a 16-year-old ex-con (Rodney Eastman), who has feelings for Jamie.
100	26	"Buddy's Daddy"	Scott Baio	Willie Aames	November 18, 1989	78431
Buddy's father (Lewis Arquette) visits and reveals he is getting a divorce.

=== Season 5 (1989–90) ===
No. overall	No. in season	Title	Directed by	Written by	Original release date	Prod. code
101	1	"Summer Together, Fall Apart"	Zane Buzby	Kathy Greer & Bill Greer	December 30, 1989	78504
After complaints from the family, Charles tells the children the house has no more rules.
102	2	"Get Thee to a Nuttery"	Scott Baio	David DiGregorio & Arnie Wess	January 6, 1990	78505
Buddy decides to become a priest after a near-death experience.
103	3	"Three Dates and a Walnut"	Scott Baio	Adrienne Armstrong	January 13, 1990	78506
Walter makes plans with three women on the same night.
104	4	"Out with the In Crowd"	Christine Ballard	Adrienne Armstrong	January 20, 1990	78509
Jamie tries to join an exclusive group of girls.
105	5	"There's a Girl in My Ficus"	Scott Baio	David DiGregorio & Arnie Wess	January 27, 1990	78508
Charles' girlfriend Jennifer (Tiffani-Amber Thiessen) tells a lie about Buddy to get rid of him.
106	6	"Judge Not Lest Ye Beheaded"	Scott Baio	David DiGregorio & Arnie Wess	February 3, 1990	78510
Charles is the judge of a beauty pageant where Jamie, Sarah, and both of Charles' girlfriends are contestants.
107	7	"Baby Bummer"	Scott Baio	Adrienne Armstrong	February 10, 1990	78503
Buddy offers to help out Adam with babysitting, but he ends up forgetting the little girl at the diner.
108	8	"Paper Covers Rock"	Scott Baio	Jim Pond & Bill Fuller	February 17, 1990	78502
A tabloid shows pictures of Charles with a rock star (Samantha Fox), and everyone thinks they are in a relationship.
109	9	"Child Hoods"	Christine Ballard	David DiGregorio & Arnie Wess	February 24, 1990	78507
Charles' old friends come to visit.
110	10	"Advice and Contempt"	Scott Baio	David DiGregorio & Arnie Wess	March 3, 1990	78514
Jamie gets upset when she thinks Charles is trying to make her boyfriend (Byrne Offutt) stop seeing her.
111	11	"Daffy Doc"	Bob Claver	R.W. Self & Willie Aames	April 28, 1990	78513
Buddy enters a mental hospital to do research, but they make him a patient.
112	12	"Buddy Flips a Disc"	Scott Baio	J. David Shapiro	May 5, 1990	78501
Buddy wins a contest to be a disc jockey for a day at the diner.
113	13	"Brain Man"	Scott Baio	Adrienne Armstrong	May 12, 1990	78517
Buddy gets tested for extrasensory perception and starts to predict the future.
114	14	"Don't Rock the Vote!"	Christine Ballard	David DiGregorio & Arnie Wess	May 19, 1990	78516
Jamie and Sarah run for class president against each other. Buddy and Charles start fighting again, which leads to a food fight erupting in the diner.
115	15	"Let's Quake a Deal"	Scott Baio	H.B. Atwater, Jr.	May 26, 1990	78518
Charles invents a device that will help people prepare for earthquakes.
116	16	"Up Your I.Q."	Christine Ballard	Adrienne Armstrong	June 2, 1990	78519
When a boy thinks Jamie is shallow, she talks to Charles' intelligent girlfriend.
117	17	"All That Chaz"	Scott Baio	Kathy Greer & Bill Greer	June 9, 1990	78521
An accidental bump on the head turns Charles into Chaz again.
118	18	"Frankie and Mommy"	Scott Baio	Adrienne Armstrong	August 25, 1990	78512
Lillian sees an old boyfriend (Robert Ridgely).
119	19	"Lost Resort"	Scott Baio	Kathy Greer & Bill Greer	September 1, 1990	78522
Charles works at a hotel in Hawaii with Buddy's cousin. (This was a pilot for a possible spin-off, which never materialized.)
120	20	"Dead Puck Society"	Zane Buzby	Kit Wilkinson & Dennis Capps	September 8, 1990	78511
As a substitute teacher for Sarah's class, Charles partners her with cute-but-manipulative Russell Davis (Paul Walker), who cons Sarah into doing all the work on their "joint" assignments. However, it turns out Russell isn't lazy at all...he's illiterate.
121	21	"La Cage Aux Fools"	Scott Baio	Adrienne Armstrong	September 15, 1990	78515
Charles and Buddy protest animal testing at their college.
122	22	"Teacher's Pest"	Kit Wilkinson	Martie Cook	September 22, 1990	78525
Walter takes a history class that Charles teaches.
123	23	"Almost Family"	Scott Baio	Mario Baio & Scott Baio	October 20, 1990	78526
Charles visits his aunt Sally at her car wash. (This was another pilot to a possible spin-off, which never materialized.)
124	24	"Seeing Is Believing"	Christine Ballard	Mitchell Bank	October 27, 1990	78524
Charles gets trapped in an elevator with a blind woman.
125	25	"Fair Exchange"	Scott Baio	Kathy Greer & Bill Greer	November 3, 1990	78523
Sarah visits her relatives in Albuquerque, and a foreign exchange student who is living with them. (Another pilot to a possible spin-off, which never materialized)
126	26	"Charles Be DeMille"	Scott Baio	Jennifer Burton & David Lang	November 10, 1990	78520
Sarah puts on a show to raise money, and Charles directs while preparing for an interview to get into Princeton.
