= David Black (writer) =

American writer

- Born: April 21, 1945 (age 81)
- Occupations: Journalist; screenwriter
- Spouse: Barbara Weisberg (m. 1996)
- Children: 3

David Black is an American journalist, biographer, novelist and screenwriter. His investigative journalism has appeared in The New York Times Magazine, New York and Harper's among other periodicals. He received the National Magazine Award for Reporting from the American Society of Magazine Editors for his two-part article on the AIDS epidemic, "The Plague Years," published in Rolling Stone in 1985. Black’s twelve books include The King of Fifth Avenue: The Fortunes of August Belmont, a biography of the influential 19th century banker that was one of 1981’s New York Times Notable Books. He has written and produced television programming for the police and courtroom dramas "Hill Street Blues," "Miami Vice," "CSI Miami," "Cop Shop," Sydney Lumet’s "100 Centre Street," and "Law & Order," co-writing the first on-air episode of "Law & Order" in 1990, as well as writing later episodes. In 2000, Black’s script for the television drama "The Confession" received the Writers Guild Award for best long-form adapted screenplay from the Writers Guild of America.

== Early life and education ==
David Black (born April 21, 1945) graduated from Classical High School in Springfield, MA in 1963 and Amherst College in Amherst, MA, in 1967. At Amherst, he was a student of poet and playwright Archibald MacLeish, about whom he later wrote the essay "Me and MacLeish".

== Career ==
Black began his career in the 1970s as a journalist, and his work has subsequently appeared in the Atlantic Monthly, Cosmopolitan, Granta, Harper’s, The New York Times Magazine, New York, Playboy, New Times, Rolling Stone, and the Village Voice. His articles cover subjects related to arts and culture such as "Commune Children," [New Times, April 1976]; along with long-form investigative pieces such as "The Making of a Doctor," [New York Times Magazine, 5/23/82] and the award-winning two-part article "The Plague Years" [Rolling Stone, March and April 1985].

From 1982 to 1986, Black taught at Mount Holyoke College as a writer-in-residence, almost forty years later writing the essay "Baldwin and Me" about his colleague there, James Baldwin.

In the late 1980s, Black went to work as a television scriptwriter, story editor, and producer, contributing to multiple television shows and series over the next two decades, concentrating primarily on police procedurals and courtroom dramas. Programs have included Hill Street Blues, Miami Vice, Law & Order, The Cosby Mysteries, Cop Shop, CSI Miami, and Sydney Lumet’s 100 Centre Street.

During the course of his career, Black has written six novels--Like Father, Minds, Peep Show, An Impossible Life, The Extinction Event, and Fast Shuffle-- and six nonfiction books in diverse genres including biography, medicine, and true crime: Ekstasy, Murder at the Met, The King of Fifth Avenue: The Fortunes of August Belmont, Medicine Man, The Plague Years, and Ripped Apart.

In 2006, Black collaborated with Shakespeare scholar Gary Taylor, joint editor of The Oxford Shakespeare, to produce the first theatrical reading of Taylor’s reconstruction of "The History of Cardenio", considered one of William Shakespeare’s lost plays. Black gathered Oscar- and Tony-winning actors Richard Dreyfuss, Whoopi Goldberg and James Naughton to participate In the New York reading. Black and Taylor later produced a staged performance of "The History of Cardenio" at the Williamstown Theater in Williamstown, MA.

== Awards and honors ==
Black’s short story, "Laud", published by the Atlantic Monthly in January 1973, received an Atlantic "First" Award. In 1981, his biography The King of Fifth Avenue was named a New York Times Notable Book. "The Plague Years", a two-part investigative article about the AIDS epidemic published in Rolling Stone in 1985, won a National Magazine Award for Reporting from the American Society of Magazine Editors. That same year, Murder at the Met, Black’s nonfiction thriller about the death of a young violinist in New York City, received an Edgar Allan Poe Award nomination from the Mystery Writers of America for the best book of fact-based crime. His Law & Order episode "Carrier" also was Edgar Award-nominated for best episode in a TV series. In 2000, Black won the Writers Guild Award for best adapted long-form screenplay for his script "The Confession," adapted from the novel Fertig by Sol Yurick. The film starred Amy Irving, Alec Baldwin, and Ben Kingsley.

== Personal life ==
Black married Deborah Hughes Keen in 1968, and they subsequently divorced. In 1996, Black married Barbara Weisberg. He has three adult children.

Black is a member of the Century Association, the Players, and the Explorers Club.
