= Phil Ramuno =

American television director

- Occupation: Television director
- Years active: 1973–present

Phil Ramuno is an American television director. During the early years of his career, he worked as a stage manager on the sitcoms Fish, Benson and Soap. His credits as a director includes Too Close for Comfort, Gimme a Break!, Amen, 9 to 5, Throb, Charles in Charge, Sister Kate and Grace Under Fire.

In 2006, along with fellow television director Mary Lou Belli, he wrote the book The Sitcom Career Book with foreword by actor Henry Winkler.
