= Throb (TV series) =

American television series

- Title card
- Genre: Sitcom
- Created by: Fredi Towbin
- Starring: Diana Canova; Jonathan Prince; Maryedith Burrell; Jane Leeves; Richard Cummings Jr. Paul Walker (season 1); Sean de Veritch (season 2)
- Music by: Tena Clark
- Opening theme: "Throb" – performed by The Nylons
- Ending theme: "Throb" – performed by Diana Canova and The Nylons
- No. of seasons: 2
- No. of episodes: 48

Production
- Executive producer: Fredi Towbin
- Producer: Jason Shubb
- Production companies: Swany, Inc. Procter & Gamble Productions; Taft Entertainment Television

Original release
- Network: Syndication
- Release: September 6, 1986 – May 21, 1988

Throb is an American sitcom that aired in syndication from September 6, 1986, to May 21, 1988. The series, created by Fredi Towbin, was produced by Procter & Gamble Productions in association with Taft Entertainment Television, and was distributed by Worldvision Enterprises. The series' rights are currently held by CBS Media Ventures.

== Synopsis ==
The series revolved around a thirty-something divorcee named Sandy Beatty (Diana Canova), who gets a job at a small new wave record label, Throb. Beatty's boss is Zachary Armstrong (Jonathan Prince), who had a huge crush on Sandy. Beatty also has a 12-year-old son named Jeremy (played in the first season by Paul Walker and in season two by Sean de Veritch). Beatty's best friend was Meredith (Maryedith Burrell), a single teacher who lived in her building, and her co-workers included hip business manager Phil Gaines (Richard Cummings, Jr.) and British-born Prudence Anne Bartlett, who was nicknamed "Blue" (Jane Leeves).

During the second season, Sandy moved from her original apartment to the recently vacated penthouse in her building. She took in her co-worker Blue to help out with rent but the differences between straitlaced, somewhat conservative Sandy and the free-spirited Blue became more pronounced as they both lived and worked together. However, they were still friends.

== Casting ==
This show was the first time many American TV viewers saw Jane Leeves, who later gained fame as Daphne Moon on Frasier. Paul Walker played Jeremy Beatty for the first season, and would become a leading man in Hollywood some 15 years later, particularly after his breakthrough role in The Fast and the Furious.

The creation of the Zachary Armstrong character, and the casting of Jonathan Prince in the role, was inspired by the (then) current rising fame of Michael J. Fox. Prince bore a strong physical resemblance to Fox, and played Zachary with many similar characterizations as Fox's Family Ties character, Alex P. Keaton. Like Alex Keaton, Zachary was also a young, diminutive overachiever on the fast track who found himself attracted to women who were both older and taller than he, the main object of his affection being Sandy.

== Cast ==
- Diana Canova - Sandy Beatty
- Jonathan Prince - Zachary Armstrong
- Maryedith Burrell - Meredith
- Jane Leeves - "Blue" (Prudence Anne Bartlett)
- Richard Cummings Jr. - Phil Gaines
- Paul Walker - Jeremy Beatty (1986–87) (as Paul W. Walker)
- Sean de Veritch - Jeremy Beatty (1987–88)

== Episodes ==
=== Season 1: 1986–1987 ===
| No. overall | No. in season | Title | Directed by | Written by | Original release date |
|---|---|---|---|---|---|
| 1 | 1 | "Pilot" | Linda Day | Fredi Towbin | September 20, 1986 |
| 2 | 2 | "Our Song" | Linda Day | George Tibbles | September 27, 1986 |
| 3 | 3 | "Getting to Know You" | Phil Ramuno | Story by : Mark Duvall & Jay Wolf; Teleplay by : Lee H. Grant | October 4, 1986 |
| 4 | 4 | "My Fair Punker Lady" | Linda Day | Story by : Sandy Krinski; Teleplay by : Hollis Rich | October 11, 1986 |
| 5 | 5 | "I Lost Him at the Movies" | Linda Day | Hollis Rich | October 18, 1986 |
| 6 | 6 | "Something Extra" | Michael Lessac | Andy Cowan & David S. Williger | October 25, 1986 |
| 7 | 7 | "Bus of Dreams" | Barnet Kellman | Michael Lessac & Fredi Towbin | November 1, 1986 |
| 8 | 8 | "The Concert" | Phil Rumuno | Michael Short | November 8, 1986 |
| 9 | 9 | "The Party" | Phil Ramuno | Andy Goldberg | November 15, 1986 |
| 10 | 10 | "Tassles" | Renny Temple | Fredi Towbin | November 22, 1986 |
| 11 | 11 | "Wedding Bell Blue" | Tony Singletary | Fredi Towbin | December 6, 1986 |
| 12 | 12 | "Nothing Personal" | Tony Singletary | Richard Marcus | December 13, 1986 |
| 13 | 13 | "Confidence Game" | Phil Ramuno | Hollis Rich | January 24, 1987 |
| 14 | 14 | "Brief Encounter" | Phil Ramuno | Story by : Sue Herring; Teleplay by : Hollis Rich | January 31, 1987 |
| 15 | 15 | "Genius" | Barnet Kellman | Jeffrey Duteil | February 7, 1987 |
| 16 | 16 | "An Oldie But Goodie" | Barnet Kellman | Story by : Seth Weisbord; Teleplay by : Joel Kimmel & Ann Gibbs | February 14, 1987 |
| 17 | 17 | "High Anxiety" | Nancy Heydorn | Richard Marcus | February 21, 1987 |
| 18 | 18 | "Death Be Not Weird" | John Bell | Hollis Rich | February 28, 1987 |
| 19 | 19 | "Buffalo" | Renny Temple | Fredi Towbin | March 21, 1987 |
| 20 | 20 | "Party Games" | Barnet Kellman | Barry Rubinowitz | April 25, 1987 |
| 21 | 21 | "Moonlighting" | Phil Ramuno | Story by : Jerry Rannow; Teleplay by : Laura Levine | May 2, 1987 |
| 22 | 22 | "Two Flights Up" | Phil Rumano | Story by : Jill Sacco & Barbara J. Herndon; Teleplay by : Richard Marcus | May 9, 1987 |
| 23 | 23 | "Nashville, Almost" | Phil Ramuno | Story by : Daniel J. Finneran; Teleplay by : Fredi Towbin & George Arthur Bloom | May 16, 1987 |
| 24 | 24 | "Rainy Day People" | Steve Zuckerman | Jeffrey Duteil & Hollis Rich | May 23, 1987 |

=== Season 2: 1987–1988 ===
| No. overall | No. in season | Title | Directed by | Written by | Original release date |
|---|---|---|---|---|---|
| 25 | 1 | "Moving In" | Stan Harris | Fredi Towbin & Hollis Rich | September 19, 1987 |
| 26 | 2 | "The Spa" | Stan Harris | Hollis Rich | September 26, 1987 |
| 27 | 3 | "Torn Between Two Lovers" | Gregory Lehane | Andy Goldberg | October 3, 1987 |
| 28 | 4 | "Future Shock" | Phil Ramuno | Story by : Molly G. Towbin; Teleplay by : Fredi Towbin | October 10, 1987 |
| 29 | 5 | "Good Vibrations" | Phil Ramuno | Laurie Newbound | October 17, 1987 |
| 30 | 6 | "Whose Coup Is It Anyway?" | Gregory Lehane | Michael Gordon | October 24, 1987 |
| 31 | 7 | "Last Night at the Fire Station: Part 1" | Phil Ramuno | Michael Gordon & Fredi Towbin | October 31, 1987 |
| 32 | 8 | "Last Night at the Fire Station: Part 2" | Phil Ramuno | Michael Gordon & Fredi Towbin | November 7, 1987 |
| 33 | 9 | "Garden Party" | Gregory Lehane | Diana Canova | November 14, 1987 |
| 34 | 10 | "Selling Out" | Gregory Lehane | Glenn Leopold & Kevin Hopps | November 21, 1987 |
| 35 | 11 | "The Golden Guys" | Gregory Lehane | Story by : Fredi Towbin; Teleplay by : Fredi Towbin & Hollis Rich | December 5, 1987 |
| 36 | 12 | "One Christmas" | Gregory Lehane | Hollis Rich & Fredi Towbin | December 12, 1987 |
| 37 | 13 | "Mary Heartless" | Joe Regalbuto | Doug McIntyre | January 2, 1988 |
| 38 | 14 | "Men Without Lips" | Marc Gass | Jane Gould & Shelly Landau | January 30, 1988 |
| 39 | 15 | "Make a Joyful Noise" | Gregory Lehane | Bill Barker & Julieta England | February 6, 1988 |
| 40 | 16 | "The Cable Show" | Gregory Lehane | Hollis Rich & Fredi Towbin | February 13, 1988 |
| 41 | 17 | "Here Come the Amish" | Phil Ramuno | Michael Gordon | February 20, 1988 |
| 42 | 18 | "Only the Lonely" | Joe Regalbuto | Lawrence H. Levy | March 5, 1988 |
| 43 | 19 | "There's No Place Like Home" | John J. Desmond | Laurie Newbound | March 12, 1988 |
| 44 | 20 | "Summer Job" | Phil Pamuno | Story by : Michael Gordon; Teleplay by : Michael Gordon & Fredi Towbin | April 23, 1988 |
| 45 | 21 | "Neil Returns" | Gregory Lehane | Hollis Rich | April 30, 1988 |
| 46 | 22 | "Jung Love" | Marc Gass | Michael Gordon | May 7, 1988 |
| 47 | 23 | "The Grammy" | James Widdoes | Barbara J. Herndon & Jill Sacco | May 14, 1988 |
| 48 | 24 | "She Can't Sing, Don't Ask Her" | Gregory Lehane | Story by : Lisa Chernin; Teleplay by : Diana Canova & Colleen Dodson | May 21, 1988 |
