= April Haney =

American child actress

April Lerman
- Years active: 1982-1992
- Spouse: William Pearson Haney (div. 2015)
- Children: 1

April Lerman is an American former actress, singer, and counselor who played the role of Kate, an orphan in the 1982 film of the musical Annie. She also was a regular cast member on the first season of Charles in Charge (1984), where she played the character of Lila Pembroke.

== Early life and career ==
Lerman began acting as a young child, appearing in the first National Tour of Annie where she played Tessie, and making her first professional screen performance in the 1982 film of the show, where she played a different character named Kate. April was then cast as Lila in the first season of Charles in Charge (1984), but the show underwent a major revamp in 1986 after being canceled in 1985 and most of the cast, including Lerman, were replaced by other actors. She spent the next few years working as an actress, appearing as a guest star in TV shows, such as Kate & Allie, Growing Pains, and Parker Lewis Can't Lose.

== Personal life ==
April divorced attorney William Pearson Haney in 2015. She has a son with him named Sean Haney. She had attended Pepperdine University School of Law and was admitted to the California Bar in 1995 but declined to pursue a career in the legal field, saying it would have been too stressful for her. When her son was seven years old, she went back to school and received a master's degree from University of Santa Monica in Counseling Psychology. April now works in a community counseling group in Thousand Oaks, California, where she works primarily with children and adolescents.

== Filmography ==
Year	Title	Role	Notes
1992	Rock and Roll Fantasy	Alex	
1991	Parker Lewis Can't Lose	Haley Madison, Parker's Girlfriend	1 episode
1990	The Marshall Chronicles	Julie	1 episode
1987	CBS Schoolbreak Special	Cindy Greco	1 episode
1986	Kate & Allie	Helen Miller	1 episode
1986	Growing Pains	Juliet Van Druten	1 episode
1984-1985	Charles in Charge	Lila Pembroke	22 episodes
1983	CBS Afternoon Playhouse	Andrea	1 episode
1983	The Brass Ring	Merle	TV movie
1982	Annie	Kate	

=== Soundtrack ===
- Annie (1982 soundtrack to film): It's The Hard-Knock Life, Sandy, Maybe (Reprise), You're Never Fully Dressed Without A Smile, Finale Medley: I Don't Need Anything But You/We Got Annie/Tomorrow.

=== Appearances as self ===
Year	Title	Role	Notes
2006	Life After Tomorrow	Herself	A documentary about former Annie orphans

=== Award nominations ===
- 1987: Nominated in the Young Artist Awards for: Exceptional Performance by a Young Actress, Guest Starring in a Television, Comedy or Drama Series for: Growing Pains (1985).
- 1986: Nominated in the Young Artist Awards for: Best Young Supporting Actress in a Television Series - Charles in Charge (1984)
