= List of awards and nominations received by Law & Order =

List of awards and nominations for Law & Order
Awards and nominations
Award	Wins	Nominations
ALMA Awards	2	6
Artios Awards	0	11
ASCAP Film and Television Music Awards	2	2
Astra Awards	0	1
BMI Film and TV Awards	10	10
Cinema Audio Society Awards	0	2
Directors Guild of America Awards	0	1
Edgar Awards	6	25
Environmental Media Awards	0	1
Genesis Awards	1	1
GLAAD Media Awards	0	2
Golden Globe Awards	0	6
Golden Reel Awards	0	3
Humanitas Prize	0	1
Imagen Awards	1	6
NAACP Image Awards	4	23
NCLR Bravo Awards	0	1
Peabody Awards	1	1
Primetime Emmy Awards	6	52
PRISM Awards	1	7
Producers Guild of America Awards	1	4
Q Awards	0	18
Satellite Awards	0	4
Screen Actors Guild Awards	2	11
Silver Gavel Awards	4	4
TCA Awards	0	12
TV Guide Awards	0	3
TV Land Awards	0	2
Writers Guild of America Awards	1	9
Young Artist Awards	0	5

Totals (Note: Certain award groups do not simply award one winner. They acknowledge several different recipients, have runners-up, and have third place. Since this is a specific recognition and is different from losing an award, runner-up mentions are considered wins in this award tally. For simplification and to avoid errors, each award in this list has been presumed to have had a prior nomination.)
- Wins: 42
- Nominations: 234

Law & Order has been nominated for numerous awards in the television industry over the span of its run.

== Awards and nominations ==
Awards and nominations received by Law & Order
Award	Year (Note: The listed year refers to the date of the ceremony, not necessarily the year in which the corresponding season or episode aired)	Category	Nominee(s)	Result	Ref.
ALMA Awards	1998	Outstanding Drama Series	Law & Order	Nominated	
ALMA Awards	1998	Outstanding Actor in a Drama Series	Benjamin Bratt	Won	
ALMA Awards	1999	Outstanding Drama Series	Law & Order	Nominated	
ALMA Awards	1999	Outstanding Actor in a Drama Series	Benjamin Bratt	Won	
ALMA Awards	2008	Outstanding Supporting Actress in a Drama Television Series	Alana de la Garza	Nominated	
ALMA Awards	2009	Outstanding Actress in a Drama Series	Alana de la Garza	Nominated	
Artios Awards	1991	Best Casting for TV, Dramatic Episodic	Lynn Kressel	Nominated	
Artios Awards	1992	Best Casting for TV, Dramatic Episodic	Lynn Kressel	Nominated	
Artios Awards	1993	Best Casting for TV, Dramatic Episodic	Lynn Kressel, Suzanne Ryan	Nominated	
Artios Awards	1994	Best Casting for TV, Dramatic Episodic	Lynn Kressel, Suzanne Ryan	Nominated	
Artios Awards	1995	Best Casting for TV, Dramatic Episodic	Lynn Kressel, Suzanne Ryan	Nominated	
Artios Awards	1996	Best Casting for TV, Dramatic Episodic	Lynn Kressel, Suzanne Ryan	Nominated	
Artios Awards	1997	Best Casting for TV, Dramatic Episodic	Lynn Kressel, Suzanne Ryan	Nominated	
Artios Awards	1998	Best Casting for TV, Dramatic Episodic	Suzanne Ryan	Nominated	
Artios Awards	1999	Best Casting for TV, Dramatic Episodic	Suzanne Ryan, Lynn Kressel	Nominated	
Artios Awards	2000	Best Casting for TV, Dramatic Episodic	Suzanne Ryan, Lynn Kressel	Nominated	
Artios Awards	2001	Best Casting for TV, Dramatic Episodic	Suzanne Ryan, Lynn Kressel	Nominated	
ASCAP Film and Television Music Awards	2005	Top TV Series	Atli Örvarsson (Note: Shared with Law & Order: Special Victims Unit)	Won	
ASCAP Film and Television Music Awards	2006	Top TV Series	Atli Örvarsson (Note: Shared with Law & Order: Special Victims Unit and Law & Order: Criminal Intent)	Won	
Astra Awards	2024	Best Broadcast Network Series, Drama	Law & Order	Nominated	
BMI Film and TV Awards	1998	BMI TV Music Award	Mike Post (Note: Shared with NYPD Blue)	Won	
BMI Film and TV Awards	1999	BMI TV Music Award	Mike Post	Won	
BMI Film and TV Awards	2000	BMI TV Music Award	Mike Post	Won	
BMI Film and TV Awards	2001	BMI TV Music Award	Mike Post (Note: Shared with NYPD Blue and Law & Order: Special Victims Unit)	Won	
BMI Film and TV Awards	2002	BMI TV Music Award	Mike Post	Won	
BMI Film and TV Awards	2003	BMI TV Music Award	Mike Post (Note: Shared with NYPD Blue, Law & Order: Special Victims Unit, and Law & Order: Criminal Intent)	Won	
BMI Film and TV Awards	2004	BMI TV Music Award	Mike Post	Won	
BMI Film and TV Awards	2005	BMI TV Music Award	Mike Post (Note: Shared with Law & Order: Special Victims Unit, Law & Order: Criminal Intent, and Law & Order: Trial By Jury)	Won	
BMI Film and TV Awards	2006	BMI TV Music Award	Mike Post	Won	
BMI Film and TV Awards	2008	BMI TV Music Award	Mike Post	Won	
Cinema Audio Society Awards	2001	Outstanding Achievement in Sound Mixing for Television – Series	Richard Murphy, Bill Nicholson, Thomas Meloeny (for "Standoff")	Nominated	
Cinema Audio Society Awards	2002	Outstanding Achievement in Sound Mixing for Television – Series	Richard Murphy, Bill Nicholson, Thomas Meloeny (for "Soldier of Fortune")	Nominated	
Directors Guild of America Awards	1999	Outstanding Directorial Achievement in Dramatic Series – Night	Adam Davidson (for "Under the Influence")	Nominated	
Edgar Awards	1991	Best Episode in a TV Series	David Black, Robert Nathan (for "Happily Ever After")	Nominated	
Edgar Awards	1992	Best Episode in a TV Series	Michael S. Chernuchin, Joe Morgenstern (for "Sonata for Solo Organ")	Nominated	
Edgar Awards	1993	Best Episode in a TV Series	René Balcer, Michael S. Chernuchin (for "Conspiracy")	Won	
Edgar Awards	1993	Best Episode in a TV Series	René Balcer, Walon Green (for "Point of View")	Nominated	
Edgar Awards	1994	Best Episode in a TV Series	René Balcer, Michael S. Chernuchin (for "Conduct Unbecoming")	Nominated	
Edgar Awards	1995	Best Episode in a TV Series	René Balcer, William N. Fordes (for "Family Values")	Nominated	
Edgar Awards	1997	Best Episode in a TV Series	René Balcer, Elaine Loeser (for "Slave")	Nominated	
Edgar Awards	1997	Best Episode in a TV Series	René Balcer (for "Causa Mortis")	Nominated	
Edgar Awards	1997	Best Episode in a TV Series	Ed Zuckerman (for "I.D.")	Nominated	
Edgar Awards	1997	Best Episode in a TV Series	I.C. Rapoport, Ed Zuckerman (for "Deadbeat")	Won	
Edgar Awards	1998	Best Episode in a TV Series	Richard Sweren, Simon Wincelberg, Ed Zuckerman (for "Double Down")	Won	
Edgar Awards	1998	Best Episode in a TV Series	René Balcer (for "Thrill")	Nominated	
Edgar Awards	1998	Best Episode in a TV Series	René Balcer, Craig Tepper (for "Blood")	Nominated	
Edgar Awards	1998	Best Episode in a TV Series	Siobhan Byrne (for "Burned")	Nominated	
Edgar Awards	1999	Best Episode in a TV Series	David Black (for "Carrier")	Nominated	
Edgar Awards	1999	Best Episode in a TV Series	René Balcer, Richard Sweren (for "Bad Girl")	Won	
Edgar Awards	2000	Best Episode in a TV Series	René Balcer (for "Hate")	Nominated	
Edgar Awards	2000	Best Episode in a TV Series	René Balcer, Robert Palm (for "Empire")	Nominated	
Edgar Awards	2000	Best Episode in a TV Series	René Balcer (for "Refuge (Part II)")	Won	
Edgar Awards	2000	Best Episode in a TV Series	Richard Sweren (for "Killerz")	Nominated	
Edgar Awards	2000	Best Episode in a TV Series	Lynn Mamet (for "Merger")	Nominated	
Edgar Awards	2001	Best Episode in a TV Series	Lynne Litt, Richard Sweren, Matt Witten (for "Black, White and Blue")	Nominated	
Edgar Awards	2001	Best Episode in a TV Series	Matt Witten (for "Endurance")	Nominated	
Edgar Awards	2003	Special Edgar	Dick Wolf	Honored	
Edgar Awards	2009	Best Episode in a TV Series	David Wilcox, Ed Zuckerman (for "Burn Card")	Nominated	
Environmental Media Awards	2002	Television Episodic – Drama	"Slaughter"	Nominated	
Genesis Awards	2002	Television – Dramatic Series	"Whose Monkey Is It Anyway?"	Won	
GLAAD Media Awards	2002	Outstanding Individual Episode	"Phobia"	Nominated	
GLAAD Media Awards	2011	Outstanding Individual Episode	"Innocence"	Nominated	
Golden Globe Awards	1992	Best Television Series – Drama	Law & Order	Nominated	
Golden Globe Awards	1994	Best Television Series – Drama	Law & Order	Nominated	
Golden Globe Awards	1994	Best Performance by an Actor in a Television Series – Drama	Michael Moriarty	Nominated	
Golden Globe Awards	1995	Best Performance by an Actor in a Television Series – Drama	Sam Waterson	Nominated	
Golden Globe Awards	1998	Best Television Series – Drama	Law & Order	Nominated	
Golden Globe Awards	1999	Best Television Series – Drama	Law & Order	Nominated	
Golden Reel Awards	2000	Best Sound Editing – Television Episodic – Dialogue & ADR	Jeffrey Kaplan, Steve Burger, Stacey Narasoni (Note: Additional crew: Michael Triffman, Andrew Rose (assistant ADR editors); Harry Johnson (voice casting); David Platt (production mixer); William Nicholson (re-recording mixer); Alan J. Holly, Herman De La Cruz (ADR mixers); Diana Flores, Angel Cox (ADR recordists)) (for "Justice")	Nominated	
Golden Reel Awards	2005	Best Sound Editing in Television Short Form – Dialogue & ADR	Jeffrey Kaplan, Michael Trifman (for "Gunplay")	Nominated	
Golden Reel Awards	2007	Best Sound Editing in Television Short Form – Dialogue and Automated Dialogue Replacement	Jeffrey Kaplan, Michael Trifman, Michael Jacobi, Jeff Kushner, Tiffany Griffith (Note: Additional crew: Kirk Herzbrun, Alex Parker (assistant dialogue/ADR editors); Larry Hoff (production sound mixer); Harry Johnson (loop group supervisor); Beauxregard Neylen, Paul Aronoff (ADR mixers), Rick Hart (dialogue re-recording mixer)) (for "Profiteer")	Nominated	
Humanitas Prize	1995	60 Minute	Michael S. Chernuchin, William N. Fordes (for "Sanctuary")	Nominated	
Imagen Awards	1993	Best Primetime Series	Law & Order	Won	
Imagen Awards	1994	Best Primetime Series	Law & Order	Nominated	
Imagen Awards	1997	Best Primetime Series	Law & Order	Nominated	
Imagen Awards	2007	Best Supporting Actress – Television	Alana de la Garza	Nominated	
Imagen Awards	2009	Best Actress – Television	Alana de la Garza	Nominated	
Imagen Awards	2010	Best Actress – Television	Alana de la Garza	Nominated	
NAACP Image Awards	1994	Outstanding Drama Series	Law & Order	Nominated	
NAACP Image Awards	1997	Outstanding Actress in a Drama Series	S. Epatha Merkerson	Nominated	
NAACP Image Awards	1998	Outstanding Actress in a Drama Series	S. Epatha Merkerson	Nominated	
NAACP Image Awards	1999	Outstanding Drama Series	Law & Order	Nominated	
NAACP Image Awards	1999	Outstanding Actress in a Drama Series	S. Epatha Merkerson	Nominated	
NAACP Image Awards	2000	Outstanding Actor in a Drama Series	Jesse L. Martin	Nominated	
NAACP Image Awards	2001	Outstanding Actor in a Drama Series	Jesse L. Martin	Nominated	
NAACP Image Awards	2001	Outstanding Actress in a Drama Series	S. Epatha Merkerson	Nominated	
NAACP Image Awards	2004	Outstanding Actor in a Drama Series	Jesse L. Martin	Nominated	
NAACP Image Awards	2005	Outstanding Drama Series	Law & Order	Won	
NAACP Image Awards	2005	Outstanding Actor in a Drama Series	Jesse L. Martin	Nominated	
NAACP Image Awards	2006	Outstanding Actor in a Drama Series	Jesse L. Martin	Nominated	
NAACP Image Awards	2006	Outstanding Supporting Actress in a Drama Series	S. Epatha Merkerson	Won	
NAACP Image Awards	2007	Outstanding Actor in a Drama Series	Jesse L. Martin	Nominated	
NAACP Image Awards	2007	Outstanding Supporting Actress in a Drama Series	S. Epatha Merkerson	Nominated	
NAACP Image Awards	2008	Outstanding Actor in a Drama Series	Jesse L. Martin	Nominated	
NAACP Image Awards	2008	Outstanding Supporting Actress in a Drama Series	S. Epatha Merkerson	Nominated	
NAACP Image Awards	2009	Outstanding Actor in a Drama Series	Anthony Anderson	Nominated	
NAACP Image Awards	2009	Outstanding Supporting Actress in a Drama Series	S. Epatha Merkerson	Nominated	
NAACP Image Awards	2010	Outstanding Actor in a Drama Series	Anthony Anderson	Nominated	
NAACP Image Awards	2010	Outstanding Supporting Actress in a Drama Series	S. Epatha Merkerson	Won	
NAACP Image Awards	2011	Outstanding Actor in a Drama Series	Anthony Anderson	Nominated	
NAACP Image Awards	2011	Outstanding Supporting Actress in a Drama Series	S. Epatha Merkerson	Won	
NCLR Bravo Awards	1996	Outstanding Actor in a Drama Series	Benjamin Bratt	Nominated	
Peabody Awards	1997	Honoree (Note: Presented to NBC and Wolf Films in association with Universal Television)		Honored	
Primetime Emmy Awards	1991	Outstanding Lead Actor in a Drama Series	Michael Moriarty (for "Indifference")	Nominated	
Primetime Emmy Awards	1992	Outstanding Drama Series	Law & Order (Note: Nominees: David Black, Michael Duggan, Jeffrey Hayes, Robert Nathan, Robert Palm, Daniel Sackheim, Joseph Stern, Dick Wolf)	Nominated	
Primetime Emmy Awards	1992	Outstanding Lead Actor in a Drama Series	Michael Moriarty (for "The Wages of Love")	Nominated	
Primetime Emmy Awards	1992	Outstanding Lead Actress in a Drama Series	Shirley Knight (Note: Nominated in the category of Outstanding Lead Actress in a Drama Series for her guest appearance) (for "The Wages of Love")	Nominated	
Primetime Emmy Awards	1992	Outstanding Supporting Actress in a Drama Series	Barbara Barrie (Note: Nominated in the category of Outstanding Supporting Actress in a Drama Series for her guest appearance) (for "Vengeance")	Nominated	
Primetime Emmy Awards	1993	Outstanding Drama Series	Law & Order (Note: Nominees: Michael S. Chernuchin, Arthur Forney, Walon Green, Jeffrey Hayes, Robert Nathan, Joseph Stern, Dick Wolf)	Nominated	
Primetime Emmy Awards	1993	Outstanding Lead Actor in a Drama Series	Michael Moriarty (for "Night and Fog")	Nominated	
Primetime Emmy Awards	1993	Outstanding Individual Achievement in Directing in a Drama Series	Ed Sherin (for "Conspiracy")	Nominated	
Primetime Emmy Awards	1993	Outstanding Individual Achievement in Writing in a Drama Series	Walon Green, Robert Nathan (for "Manhood")	Nominated	
Primetime Emmy Awards	1994	Outstanding Drama Series	Law & Order (Note: Nominees: René Balcer, Michael S. Chernuchin, Arthur Forney, Lew Gould, Walon Green, Jeffrey Hayes, Robert Nathan, Ed Sherin, Dick Wolf)	Nominated	
Primetime Emmy Awards	1994	Outstanding Lead Actor in a Drama Series	Michael Moriarty (for "Sanctuary")	Nominated	
Primetime Emmy Awards	1995	Outstanding Drama Series	Law & Order (Note: Nominees: René Balcer, Michael S. Chernuchin, Arthur Forney, Lew Gould, Jeffrey Hayes, Mark B. Perry, Ed Sherin, Dick Wolf, Ed Zuckerman)	Nominated	
Primetime Emmy Awards	1996	Outstanding Drama Series	Law & Order (Note: Nominees: René Balcer, Michael S. Chernuchin, Arthur Forney, Billy Fox, Morgan Gendel, Lew Gould, Jeffrey Hayes, Ed Sherin, Dick Wolf, Ed Zuckerman)	Nominated	
Primetime Emmy Awards	1997	Outstanding Drama Series	Law & Order (Note: Nominees: René Balcer, Arthur Forney, Billy Fox, Lewis H. Gould, Jeffrey Hayes, Ed Sherin, Gardner Stern, Dick Wolf, Ed Zuckerman, Jeremy R. Littman)	Won	
Primetime Emmy Awards	1997	Outstanding Lead Actor in a Drama Series	Sam Waterson (for "Mad Dog")	Nominated	
Primetime Emmy Awards	1998	Outstanding Drama Series	Law & Order (Note: Nominees: René Balcer, David Black, William N. Fordes, Arthur Forney, Billy Fox, Lewis H. Gould, Jeffrey Hayes, Kathy McCormick, I. C. Rapoport, Ed Sherin, David Shore, Richard Sweren, Dick Wolf)	Nominated	
Primetime Emmy Awards	1998	Outstanding Supporting Actor in a Drama Series	Steven Hill	Nominated	
Primetime Emmy Awards	1999	Outstanding Drama Series	Law & Order (Note: Nominees: René Balcer, William N. Fordes, Billy Fox, Lewis H. Gould, Jeffrey Hayes, Kathy McCormick, Ed Sherin, David Shore, Richard Sweren, Dick Wolf, Ed Zuckerman)	Nominated	
Primetime Emmy Awards	1999	Outstanding Lead Actor in a Drama Series	Sam Waterson (for "Sideshow")	Nominated	
Primetime Emmy Awards	1999	Outstanding Supporting Actor in a Drama Series	Steven Hill	Nominated	
Primetime Emmy Awards	1999	Outstanding Supporting Actor in a Drama Series	Benjamin Bratt	Nominated	
Primetime Emmy Awards	1999	Outstanding Directing for a Drama Series	Ed Sherin (Note: Shared with Homicide: Life on the Street) (for "Sideshow")	Nominated	
Primetime Emmy Awards	1999	Outstanding Directing for a Drama Series	Matthew Penn (for "Empire")	Nominated	
Primetime Emmy Awards	2000	Outstanding Drama Series	Law & Order (Note: Nominees: René Balcer, William N. Fordes, Billy Fox, Lewis H. Gould, Jeffrey Hayes, Lynn Mamet, Kathy McCormick, Barry Schindel, Ed Sherin, Richard Sweren, Dick Wolf)	Nominated	
Primetime Emmy Awards	2000	Outstanding Lead Actor in a Drama Series	Sam Waterson (for "Killerz")	Nominated	
Primetime Emmy Awards	2000	Outstanding Lead Actor in a Drama Series	Jerry Orbach (for "Marathon")	Nominated	
Primetime Emmy Awards	2001	Outstanding Drama Series	Law & Order (Note: Nominees: William Finkelstein, William Fordes, Arthur Forney, Lewis H. Gould, Jeffrey Hayes, Kati Johnston, Gary Karr, Lynn Mamet, Kathy McCormick, Arthur Penn, Barry Schindel, Richard Sweren, Dick Wolf)	Nominated	
Primetime Emmy Awards	2002	Outstanding Drama Series	Law & Order (Note: Nominees: Wendy Battles, William N. Fordes, Arthur Forney, Lewis H. Gould, Jeffrey Hayes, Peter Jankowski, Kati Johnston, Gary Karr, Eric Overmyer, Barry Schindel, Richard Sweren, Roz Weinman, Dick Wolf)	Nominated	
Primetime Creative Arts Emmy Awards	1992	Outstanding Individual Achievement in Editing for a Series – Single-Camera Production	Arthur Forney (for "Misconception")	Nominated	
Primetime Creative Arts Emmy Awards	1992	Outstanding Individual Achievement in Sound Editing for a Series	Peter Bergren, David A. Cohen, Frank Andrew Fuller, David Hankins, Jim Hebenstreit, Barbara Issak, Albert Edmund Lord III, Barbara Schechter, Rich Thomas (for "Heaven")	Won	
Primetime Creative Arts Emmy Awards	1993	Outstanding Guest Actress in a Drama Series	Elaine Stritch (for "Point of View")	Won	
Primetime Creative Arts Emmy Awards	1993	Outstanding Individual Achievement in Cinematography for a Series	Constantine Makris (for "Conspiracy")	Won	
Primetime Creative Arts Emmy Awards	1994	Outstanding Individual Achievement in Editing for a Series – Single-Camera Production	Billy Fox, Laurie Grotstein (for "Sanctuary")	Nominated	
Primetime Creative Arts Emmy Awards	1996	Outstanding Sound Editing for a Series	Michael Gollom, Jeffrey Kaplan, Libby Pederson, Mark Server (for "Hot Pursuit")	Nominated	
Primetime Creative Arts Emmy Awards	1997	Outstanding Cinematography for a Series	Constantine Makris (for "Mad Dog")	Won	
Primetime Creative Arts Emmy Awards	1997	Outstanding Single-Camera Picture Editing for a Series	David Siegel (for "Turnaround")	Nominated	
Primetime Creative Arts Emmy Awards	1997	Outstanding Sound Mixing for a Drama Series	Bill Nicholson, Thomas Meloeny, David Platt (for "D-Girl")	Nominated	
Primetime Creative Arts Emmy Awards	1998	Outstanding Casting for a Series	Lynn Kressel, Suzanne Ryan	Nominated	
Primetime Creative Arts Emmy Awards	1998	Outstanding Cinematography for a Series	Constantine Makris (for "Stalker")	Won	
Primetime Creative Arts Emmy Awards	1999	Outstanding Guest Actress in a Drama Series	Julia Roberts (for "Empire")	Nominated	
Primetime Creative Arts Emmy Awards	1999	Outstanding Casting for a Series	Suzanne Ryan	Nominated	
Primetime Creative Arts Emmy Awards	1999	Outstanding Costume Design for a Series	Jennifer von Mayrhauser (for "Refuge (Parts I and II)")	Nominated	
Primetime Creative Arts Emmy Awards	1999	Outstanding Sound Mixing for a Drama Series	Bill Nicholson, Thomas Meloeny, David Platt (for "Empire")	Nominated	
Primetime Creative Arts Emmy Awards	2000	Outstanding Guest Actress in a Drama Series	Jane Alexander (for "Entitled")	Nominated	
Primetime Creative Arts Emmy Awards	2000	Outstanding Casting for a Drama Series	Suzanne Ryan	Nominated	
Primetime Creative Arts Emmy Awards	2000	Outstanding Cinematography for a Single-Camera Series	Constantine Makris (for "Entitled")	Nominated	
Primetime Creative Arts Emmy Awards	2000	Outstanding Sound Mixing for a Drama Series	Bill Nicholson, Thomas Meloeny, David Platt (for "Gunshow")	Nominated	
Primetime Creative Arts Emmy Awards	2001	Outstanding Casting for a Drama Series	Suzanne Ryan	Nominated	
Primetime Creative Arts Emmy Awards	2001	Outstanding Cinematography for a Single-Camera Series	John Beymer (for "Endurance")	Nominated	
Primetime Creative Arts Emmy Awards	2001	Outstanding Single-Camera Sound Mixing for a Series	Richard Murphy, Bill Nicholson, Thomas Meloeny (for "School Daze")	Nominated	
Primetime Creative Arts Emmy Awards	2002	Outstanding Casting for a Drama Series	Suzanne Ryan	Nominated	
Primetime Creative Arts Emmy Awards	2003	Outstanding Guest Actress in a Drama Series	Tovah Feldshuh	Nominated	
PRISM Awards	1999	TV Prime Time Drama Series Episode	"Under the Influence" (Note: Received PRISM Commendation)	Nominated	
PRISM Awards	2000	TV Prime Time Drama Series Episode	"Merger"	Nominated	
PRISM Awards	2003	TV Drama Series Episode	"Dazzled" (Note: Received PRISM Certificate of Merit)	Nominated	
PRISM Awards	2003	TV Drama Series Episode	"True Crime"	Nominated	
PRISM Awards	2007	Bipolar Disorder Award	"Heart of Darkness"	Nominated	
PRISM Awards	2010	Drama Series Episode – Mental Health	"Exchange"	Won	
PRISM Awards	2010	Drama Series Episode – Mental Health	"Skate or Die"	Nominated	
Producers Guild of America Awards	1994	Outstanding Producer of Television		Nominated	
Producers Guild of America Awards	1997	Outstanding Producer of Episodic Television	René Balcer, Michael S. Chernuchin, Arthur Forney, Billy Fox, Lewis H. Gould, Jeffrey Hayes, Jeremy R. Littman, Ed Sherin, Gardner Stern, Dick Wolf, Ed Zuckerman	Won	
Producers Guild of America Awards	2001	Outstanding Producer of Episodic Television, Drama		Nominated	
Producers Guild of America Awards	2002	Outstanding Producer of Episodic Television, Drama		Nominated	
Q Awards	1991	Best Quality Drama Series	Law & Order	Nominated	
Q Awards	1991	Best Actor in a Quality Drama Series	Michael Moriarty	Nominated	
Q Awards	1992	Best Quality Drama Series	Law & Order	Nominated	
Q Awards	1992	Best Actor in a Quality Drama Series	Michael Moriarty	Nominated	
Q Awards	1993	Best Quality Drama Series	Law & Order	Nominated	
Q Awards	1994	Best Quality Drama Series	Law & Order	Nominated	
Q Awards	1994	Best Actor in a Quality Drama Series	Michael Moriarty	Nominated	
Q Awards	1994	Best Supporting Actor in a Quality Drama Series	Chris Noth	Nominated	
Q Awards	1997	Best Quality Drama Series	Law & Order	Nominated	
Q Awards	1998	Best Quality Drama Series	Law & Order	Nominated	
Q Awards	1998	Best Actor in a Quality Drama Series	Sam Waterson	Nominated	
Q Awards	1998	Best Supporting Actor in a Quality Drama Series	Jerry Orbach	Nominated	
Q Awards	1999	Best Quality Drama Series	Law & Order	Nominated	
Q Awards	1999	Best Actor in a Quality Drama Series	Sam Waterson	Nominated	
Q Awards	1999	Best Supporting Actor in a Quality Drama Series	Jerry Orbach	Nominated	
Q Awards	2000	Best Quality Drama Series	Law & Order	Nominated	
Q Awards	2000	Best Actor in a Quality Drama Series	Sam Waterson	Nominated	
Q Awards	2000	Best Supporting Actor in a Quality Drama Series	Jerry Orbach	Nominated	
Satellite Awards	1998	Best Television Series, Drama	Law & Order	Nominated	
Satellite Awards	1998	Best Actor in a Series, Drama	Sam Waterson	Nominated	
Satellite Awards	2000	Best Television Series, Drama	Law & Order	Nominated	
Satellite Awards	2000	Best Actor in a Series, Drama	Sam Waterson	Nominated	
Screen Actors Guild Awards	1995	Outstanding Performance by an Ensemble in a Drama Series	Jill Hennessy, Steven Hill, S. Epatha Merkerson, Chris Noth, Jerry Orbach, Sam Waterston	Nominated	
Screen Actors Guild Awards	1996	Outstanding Performance by an Ensemble in a Drama Series	Benjamin Bratt, Jill Hennessy, Steven Hill, S. Epatha Merkerson, Chris Noth, Jerry Orbach, Sam Waterston	Nominated	
Screen Actors Guild Awards	1997	Outstanding Performance by an Ensemble in a Drama Series	Benjamin Bratt, Steven Hill, Carey Lowell, S. Epatha Merkerson, Jerry Orbach, Sam Waterston	Nominated	
Screen Actors Guild Awards	1998	Outstanding Performance by a Male Actor in a Drama Series	Sam Waterson	Nominated	
Screen Actors Guild Awards	1998	Outstanding Performance by an Ensemble in a Drama Series	Benjamin Bratt, Steven Hill, Carey Lowell, S. Epatha Merkerson, Jerry Orbach, Sam Waterston	Nominated	
Screen Actors Guild Awards	1999	Outstanding Performance by a Male Actor in a Drama Series	Sam Waterson	Won	
Screen Actors Guild Awards	1999	Outstanding Performance by an Ensemble in a Drama Series	Angie Harmon, Steven Hill, Jesse L. Martin, S. Epatha Merkerson, Jerry Orbach, Sam Waterston	Nominated	
Screen Actors Guild Awards	2000	Outstanding Performance by an Ensemble in a Drama Series	Angie Harmon, Jesse L. Martin, S. Epatha Merkerson, Jerry Orbach, Sam Waterston, Dianne Wiest	Nominated	
Screen Actors Guild Awards	2001	Outstanding Performance by an Ensemble in a Drama Series	Jesse L. Martin, S. Epatha Merkerson, Jerry Orbach, Elisabeth Röhm, Sam Waterston, Dianne Wiest	Nominated	
Screen Actors Guild Awards	2003	Outstanding Performance by an Ensemble in a Drama Series	Jesse L. Martin, S. Epatha Merkerson, Jerry Orbach, Elisabeth Röhm, Fred Dalton Thompson, Sam Waterston	Nominated	
Screen Actors Guild Awards	2005	Outstanding Performance by a Male Actor in a Drama Series	Jerry Orbach (posthumous)	Won	
Silver Gavel Awards	1992	Television	Dick Wolf (for "Asylum")	Won	
Silver Gavel Awards	1993	Television	Dick Wolf (for "Intolerance")	Won	
Silver Gavel Awards	1999	Television	René Balcer, Constantine Makris (for "DWB")	Won	
Silver Gavel Awards	2000	Television	René Balcer, Constantine Makris (for "Hate")	Won	
TCA Awards	1991	Outstanding Achievement in Drama	Law & Order	Nominated	
TCA Awards	1992	Outstanding Achievement in Drama	Law & Order	Nominated	
TCA Awards	1993	Outstanding Achievement in Drama	Law & Order	Nominated	
TCA Awards	1994	Outstanding Achievement in Drama	Law & Order	Nominated	
TCA Awards	1995	Outstanding Achievement in Drama	Law & Order	Nominated	
TCA Awards	1996	Outstanding Achievement in Drama	Law & Order	Nominated	
TCA Awards	1997	Outstanding Achievement in Drama	Law & Order	Nominated	
TCA Awards	1998	Outstanding Achievement in Drama	Law & Order	Nominated	
TCA Awards	1999	Outstanding Achievement in Drama	Law & Order	Nominated	
TCA Awards	2002	Heritage Award		Nominated	
TCA Awards	2003	Heritage Award		Nominated	
TCA Awards	2010	Heritage Award		Nominated	
TV Guide Awards	2000	Favorite Actor in a Drama Series	Sam Waterson	Nominated	
TV Guide Awards	2001	Drama Series of the Year	Law & Order	Nominated	
TV Guide Awards	2001	Actor of the Year in a Drama Series	Sam Waterson	Nominated	
TV Land Awards	2005	Favorite "Casual Friday" Cop	Jerry Orbach	Nominated	
TV Land Awards	2006	Coolest Crime Fighting Team	Chris Noth, Jerry Orbach	Nominated	
Writers Guild of America Awards	1992	Television: Episodic Drama	Dick Wolf (for "Everybody's Favorite Bagman")	Nominated	
Writers Guild of America Awards	1997	Television: Episodic Drama	Morgan Gendel, Barry M. Schkolnick, Michael S. Chernuchin (for "Savages")	Nominated	
Writers Guild of America Awards	1997	Television: Episodic Drama	Ed Zuckerman, Jeremy R. Littman (for "Trophy")	Nominated	
Writers Guild of America Awards	1997	Television: Episodic Drama	Michael S. Chernuchin, Janis Diamond (for "Aftershock")	Nominated	
Writers Guild of America Awards	1998	Television: Episodic Drama	Ed Zuckerman, I.C. Rapoport (for "Deadbeat")	Nominated	
Writers Guild of America Awards	1998	Television: Episodic Drama	René Balcer, Richard Sweren (for "Entrapment")	Won	
Writers Guild of America Awards	1999	Television: Episodic Drama	Siobhan Byrne (for "Burned")	Nominated	
Writers Guild of America Awards	2000	Television: Episodic Drama	René Balcer (for "DWB")	Nominated	
Writers Guild of America Awards	2004	Television: Episodic Drama	Michael S. Chernuchin (for "Bounty")	Nominated	
Young Artist Awards	1993	Best Young Actor Guest-Starring in a Television Series	Harley Cross	Nominated	
Young Artist Awards	1995	Best Performance by a Youth Actor – TV Guest Star	Wil Horneff	Nominated	
Young Artist Awards	1995	Best Performance by a Youth Actor – TV Guest Star	Erik Alperin	Nominated	
Young Artist Awards	1995	Best Performance by a Youth Actress – TV Guest Star	Madeline Zima	Nominated	
Young Artist Awards	2000	Best Performance in a TV Drama Series – Guest Starring Young Actress	Hallee Hirsh	Nominated	
