= Sandra Kerns =

American actress

- Born: Sandra Borgsmiller; July 20, 1949 (age 76); Murphysboro, Illinois, U.S.
- Occupation: Actress
- Years active: 1976-1993
- Spouse: Hubie Kerns Jr. (Oct 18, 1975-present)
- Children: 2 children

Sandra Borgsmiller Kerns (born July 20, 1949) is a retired American movie and television actress who worked on television in the 1970s and 1980s before retiring to care for her family with husband Hubie Kerns Jr., a stuntman.

== Early years ==
Sandra Borgsmiller is one of five children born to Dr. William J. Borgsmiller (died August 4, 1999) and June K. Borgsmiller (died June 11, 2008).

== Career ==
In 1979, Kerns starred in Hawaii Five-O as Maren in the episode "Stringer". However, Kerns is probably best known to viewers for her role as Ellen Powell on Charles in Charge. She was a regular cast member when the show initially went into first-run syndication in January 1987. However, in the final two seasons, she abruptly left the show and only made three more appearances (once in season four and twice in season five). She last acted in 1993 but appeared as herself in an episode of E! True Hollywood Story in 2006.

== Family ==
Kerns and her husband were married on a Malibu mountain top in 1975, and currently live in Pacific Palisades, California.

They have two children, including son Zachariah Sage Kerns, a musician and DJ, and Kallie Kerns, an actress and stunt performer.

== Filmography ==
=== Film ===
Year	Title	Role	Notes
1978	Dr. Scorpion	Sharon Shackelford	Television movie
1978	House Calls	Lani Mason	
1981	Green Ice	Woman at bar	
1982	Moonlight	Judi Becker	Television movie
1983	Flicks	Laura Blik	Voice role
1984	Solo	Liz Brantley	
1989	CHUD II: Bud the CHUD	Melissa Williams	

=== Television ===
Year	Title	Role	Notes
1976	Marcus Welby, M.D.	Alma	Episode: "The Highest Mountain"
1976	S.W.A.T.	Jackie	Episode: "Officer Luca, You’re Dead"
1976	Black Sheep Squadron	Nurse	Episode: "Flying Misfits"
1976	Sanford and Son	Stewardess	2 episodes
1976	The Rockford Files	Robin Siedlitz	Episode: "Rattlers' Class of '63"
1976	Police Story	Party Girl #1	Episode: "Monster Manor"
1977	Police Story	Karen Reed	Episode: "Nightmare on a Sunday Morning"
1977	The McLean Stevenson Show	Susan	Episode: "Janet Leaves Home"
1977	Rafferty	Carla Magnus	Episode: "The Will to Live"
1978	Grandpa Goes to Washington	Jenny Campbell	2 episodes
1979	Barnaby Jones	Penny Tremayne	Episode: "Dance with Death"
1979	Hawaii Five-O	Maren Wilson	Episode: "Stringer"
1979	A Man Called Sloane	Alice Baker	Episode: "Tuned for Destruction"
1979	Hart to Hart	Crystal	Episode: "Cop Out"
1979	The Incredible Hulk	Maggie	Episode: "Jake"
1980	The Rockford Files	Carrie Osgood	Episode: "Deadlock in Parma"
1981	The Incredible Hulk	Sondra	Episode: "Two Godmothers"
1981	Flamingo Road	Beth MacDonald	Episode: "Secrets"
1981	Trapper John, M.D.	Cora Sue	Episode: "Hate Is Enough"
1982	The Magical World of Disney	—N/a	Episode: "Tales of the Apple Dumpling Gang"
1982	The Greatest American Hero	Samantha Brice	Episode: "It’s All Downhill from Here"
1982	CHiPs	Darla	Episode: "The Game of War"
1984	Scarecrow and Mrs. King	Gail Taylor	Episode: "Brunettes Are In"
1985	Trapper John, M.D.	Cassandra	Episode: "Buckaroo Bob Rides Again"
1987–90	Charles in Charge	Ellen Powell	38 episodes
1988	Punky Brewster	Ms. Jenner	Episode: "Bad Dog"
1989	Who's the Boss?	Pati	Episode: "Sex, Lies and Exercise Tapes"
1991	She-Wolf of London	Karen Colfax	Episode: "Habeas Corpus"
