= Barbara Weisberg =

American historian, author, and TV producer

Barbara M. Weisberg (born 1946) is an American historian, author, and television producer. In the 1980s, she co-created the television series Charles in Charge. She has published multiple historical nonfiction books, including Strong Passions, published in 2024.

== Early life and education ==
Weisberg was born in Philadelphia on April 3, 1946, to Samuel and Miriam Weisberg. Her father was a furrier, and her mother was an artist.

Weisberg received a Bachelor of Arts in American civilization from the University of Pennsylvania, graduating magna cum laude, Phi Beta Kappa in 1968. She then earned a Master of Philosophy in American Studies from Yale University in 1972 and a Master of Fine Arts in creative writing from Brooklyn College in 1993.

== Career ==
In the early 1980s, Weisberg worked with the Scholastic Corporation as the associate director of television development, after which she joined Consumer Reports, working in a similar position. While there, she created the comedy series Charles in Charge and produced documentary programs, as well as episodes of the television series Livewire.

== Awards and honors ==
Weisberg has received a MacArthur Scholarship in Poetry, the D. Scott Rogo Award from the Parapsychology Foundation in 1998, and the Lila Wallace/Reader's Digest Fund grant for Creative Writers and Artists from the American Antiquarian Society in 1998.

The Atlanta Journal-Constitution named Talking to the Dead one of the best books of 2004.

The Minneapolis Star Tribune chose Strong Passions as one of the best books of 2024.

== Personal life ==
On June 20, 1996, Weisberg married writer David Black, who had three children.

== Works ==
=== Adult nonfiction books ===
- Weisberg, Barbara (April 13, 2004). Talking to the Dead. New York: HarperOne. ISBN 978-0-06-056667-8.
- Weisberg, Barbara (February 20, 2024). Strong Passions: A Scandalous Divorce in Old New York. W. W. Norton. ISBN 978-0-393-53152-7.

=== Children's nonfiction books ===
- Weisberg, Barbara (January 1, 1989). Susan B. Anthony: Woman Suffragist. New York: Chelsea House Pub. ISBN 978-0-79-100408-1.
- Weisberg, Barbara (February 14, 2015). Space Creatures. Illustrated by Kate Arnold. CreateSpace. ISBN 978-1-50-094121-5.
- Coronado's Golden Quest (1993)
- The Big Golden Book of Knights and Castles (1993)
