= Charles in Charge =

American comedy television series

- Genre: Sitcom
- Created by: Michael Jacobs; Barbara Weisberg
- Starring: Scott Baio; Willie Aames; Julie Cobb; James Widdoes; April Lerman; Jonathan Ward; Michael Pearlman; Jennifer Runyon; Sandra Kerns; Nicole Eggert; Josie Davis; Alexander Polinsky; Ellen Travolta; James T. Callahan; Justin Whalin
- Theme music composer: Michael Jacobs; Al Burton; David Kurtz
- Opening theme: "Charles in Charge" performed by Shandi Sinnamon
- Composers: David Kurtz (1987–88); Timothy Thompson (1988–89); Todd Hayen (1989–90)
- Country of origin: United States
- Original language: English
- No. of seasons: 5
- No. of episodes: 126 (list of episodes)

Production
- Executive producer: Al Burton
- Producers: Michael Jacobs; (season 1); Roseanne Leto (pilot); Mitchell Bank; Todd E. Kessler (seasons 2–4)
- Running time: 22 minutes
- Production companies: Al Burton Productions; Scholastic Productions; Universal Television

Original release
- Network: CBS
- Release: October 3, 1984 – April 3, 1985
- Network: Syndication
- Release: January 3, 1987 – November 10, 1990

Charles in Charge is an American sitcom television series that premiered on October 3, 1984, on CBS. The series was a production of Al Burton Productions and Scholastic Productions in association with Universal Television and starred Scott Baio, who had previously starred in Happy Days, in the title role. Willie Aames, who had previously been a cast member on Eight Is Enough, also starred as Charles' best friend Buddy Lembeck.

Charles in Charge joined the CBS Wednesday night lineup at 8:00 pm, placing it against ABC's hit action series The Fall Guy and the new Michael Landon-led Highway to Heaven on NBC. At the time, with the exception of their Monday-night comedies (Kate & Allie and Newhart), CBS's sitcom lineup was not performing well in the ratings and Charles in Charge did not do much to change that. Still, the network allowed the show to remain in production to complete the 22 episodes it had ordered for the season.

After the February 27, 1985, episode, CBS placed Charles in Charge on hiatus. Two episodes had yet to air, and CBS aired them on March 13 and April 3, 1985. The network then dropped Charles in Charge from its Wednesday lineup in favor of the mystery drama series Double Dare; the show was moved to Saturday, where it aired in reruns for several weeks until it was replaced by the drama Cover Up. None of these series were renewed for a second season, nor were either of the two comedies that shared the hour with Charles in Charge (Dreams and E/R).

One year later, after seeing the success of some canceled network series after they were revived for first-run syndication (which was a significant trend at the time), Universal decided to rework and relaunch Charles in Charge in syndication. The show premiered on local stations at the midway point of the 1986–87 season, with the first episode of the new series premiering on January 3, 1987. Four seasons were produced for syndication, with the last episode airing on November 10, 1990. In total, 126 episodes were produced, 22 in the abbreviated first season and 26 in each of the syndicated seasons.

== Premise ==
The series takes place in New Brunswick, New Jersey. Charles, who has no given surname, is a student at Copeland College and is 19 years old when the series begins.

=== First season ===
Needing a place to live while attending school, Charles applies for a job working for Stan and Jill Pembroke, an affluent couple in search of a live-in housekeeper. An arrangement is reached where Charles would take the job with the Pembrokes while he attended Copeland, and in lieu of a salary, he would receive room and board for his duties as caretaker for their children Jason, Douglas, and Lila. In addition to this, as well as his escapades with his best friend Buddy, Charles has a crush on fellow Copeland student Gwendolyn Pierce and spends quite a bit of his free time trying to court her, which never seems to work.

=== Syndication changes ===
When the show returned in 1987, only Scott Baio and Willie Aames returned from the original cast, and the producers reworked the story to accommodate the changes in cast.

The second season's first episode featured Charles returning to New Brunswick from his summer vacation, only to discover an unfamiliar family living in the Pembrokes' home. He learns that the Pembrokes left New Jersey while he was away and have moved across the country to Seattle. The new family, the Powells, agreed to sublet the house from the Pembrokes, which included retaining Charles' services as live-in babysitter.

The Powell clan consisted of mother Ellen and grandfather Walter, who was Ellen's widowed father-in-law and was living with them to fill a fatherhood role as his son served overseas in the U.S. Navy. Like the Pembrokes, the Powells also had three children, daughters Jamie and Sarah and younger brother Adam.

Charles' previously unseen widowed mother Lillian became a central character in the revival series. She was played by Ellen Travolta, which marked the second time that she had played mother to a character portrayed by Baio; she had done the same thing on Happy Days and its spinoff, Joanie Loves Chachi, several years earlier.

== Cast ==
Actor	Character	Seasons				
Actor	Character	1	2	3	4	5
Scott Baio	Charles	Main	Main	Main	Main	Main
Willie Aames	Buddy Lembeck	Main	Main	Main	Main	Main
Jennifer Runyon	Gwendolyn Pierce	Main	Guest			
James Widdoes	Stan Pembroke	Main				
Julie Cobb	Jill Pembroke	Main				
April Lerman	Lila Pembroke	Main				
Jonathan Ward	Douglas Pembroke	Main				
Michael Pearlman	Jason Pembroke	Main	Guest			
James T. Callahan	Walter Powell		Main	Main	Main	Main
Sandra Kerns	Ellen Powell		Main	Main	Guest	Recurring
Nicole Eggert	Jamie Powell		Main	Main	Main	Main
Josie Davis	Sarah Powell		Main	Main	Main	Main
Alexander Polinsky	Adam Powell		Main	Main	Main	Main
Ellen Travolta	Lillian		Recurring	Main	Main	Main

Besides Baio and Aames, Michael Pearlman and Jennifer Runyon are the only other main cast members to reprise their roles on the show after the first season. Pearlman appeared in the second-season premiere, "Amityville". (Lisa Donovan played Jill Pembroke in that episode.) Runyon appeared in "Twice Upon a Time (Part 1)" and "Twice Upon a Time (Part 2)". (Gymnast Julianne McNamara appeared in both seasons 1 and 2 as cheerleader Paula Thackery.) British singer Samantha Fox appeared in one episode as famous singer Samantha Steel, who Charles becomes involved with before ending the relationship due to her being married. Mindy Cohn appeared once as Buddy's sister named Bunny who had problems with alcoholism.

In the final two seasons, Sandra Kerns only made three more appearances (once in season 4 and twice in season 5). Baio and Aames are the only two cast members who appear in every single episode.

== Theme song ==
The theme song was composed by David Kurtz, Michael Jacobs, and Al Burton, and performed by Shandi Sinnamon. The theme music was mellower in the first season, and was remixed for the syndication run.

== Episodes ==
Season	Episodes	Originally released		
Season	Episodes	First released	Last released	Network
1	22	October 3, 1984	April 3, 1985	CBS
2	26	January 3, 1987	June 27, 1987	Syndication
3	26	December 26, 1987	June 18, 1988	Syndication
4	26	December 31, 1988	November 18, 1989	Syndication
5	26	December 30, 1989	November 10, 1990	Syndication

== Home media ==
=== DVDs ===
Universal Pictures released a three-disc set of the first season of Charles in Charge on DVD in North America on February 14, 2006. Due to poor sales, no further seasons were released.

In September 2007, Arts Alliance America (which subsequently changed its name to Virgil Films & Entertainment during the summer of 2007) announced it had acquired the rights to the series. They subsequently released seasons 2–5 on DVD. Seasons 4 and 5 were Manufacture-on-Demand (MOD) releases, available exclusively through Amazon.com.

DVD name	Ep #	Release date
The Complete First Season	22	February 14, 2006
The Complete Second Season	26	November 20, 2007
The Complete Third Season	26	May 20, 2008
The Complete Fourth Season	26	March 24, 2009
The Complete Fifth and Final Season	26	July 28, 2009

=== Streaming ===
To date, all five seasons are able to purchase on Amazon Prime and iTunes. Amazon Prime and iTunes are missing the episode "Discipline" from Season 1, while Amazon Prime is also missing "Her Brother's Keeper" and "The Undergraduate" from Season 2, "The Heart Burglar" and "May the Best Man Lose" from Season 3, "Big Bang" and "Bad Boy" from Season 4 and "Fair Exchange" and "Charles Be DeMille" from Season 5.

== Syndication reruns ==
When Charles in Charge returned to television, an arrangement had been made with stations owned by Tribune Broadcasting to carry the program in first run. Through this arrangement, the show was also able to gain nationwide carriage as its Chicago affiliate, WGN-TV, was a national cable superstation.

In 1988, with the series nearing the 100-episode mark, distributor MCA Television began advertising in trade publications that it would begin selling reruns of Charles in Charge to local stations for a fall 1989 launch. The initial syndicated package consisted of the three seasons of syndicated episodes and the 22 episodes that had aired on CBS; the package later added the 26 episodes from the final syndicated season that launched in December 1989 and concluded in November of 1990.
