= Arthur season 6 =

Arthur
- Season 6
- No. of episodes: 10 (20 segments)

Release
- Original network: PBS
- Original release: September 24 – November 26, 2001

Season chronology
- ← Previous; Season 5 Next → Season 7

The sixth season of the television series Arthur was originally broadcast on PBS in the United States on September 24 to November 26, 2001 and contains 10 episodes. A shortened version of the remix of the opening theme song, "Believe in Yourself", is played at the ending credits of this season as a promotion for the third music album of the franchise. Olympic figure skater Michelle Kwan guest starred on "The Good Sport" as herself. Justin Bradley replaces Michael Yarmush as the voice of Arthur Read. Additionally, Samuel Holden replaces Ricky Mabe as the voice of Timmy Tibble. It is also the final season to feature the voices of Oliver Grainger, Steven Crowder, Jonathan Koensgen, and Vanessa Lengies as D.W. Read, Alan "Brain" Powers, Tommy Tibble, and Emily Leduc, respectively.

Funding for the sixth season of Arthur was provided by corporate sponsoring from LEGO, Juicy Juice, and Post Alpha-Bits, and by a Ready-to-Learn grant from the U.S. Department of Education through the Corporation for Public Broadcasting, and PBS viewers.

== Episodes ==
No. overall	No. in season	Title	Written by	Storyboard by	Original release date	Prod. code
86a	1a	"Sue Ellen Gets Her Goose Cooked"	Written by : Peter K. Hirsch; Idea by : Bill Shribman	Robert Yap	September 24, 2001	86B
Sue Ellen is addicted to a new video game called Virtual Goose and forbids herself from playing it for a week. She struggles to resist the urge to play it when none of her friends can beat a mysterious challenger named Fourhand451. When Sue Ellen tries, she loses, and the challenger seems unbeatable, until D.W., who knows the game is a virtual version of her favorite board game, "Confuse the Goose", steps in to save the day.
86b	1b	"Best of the Nest"	Peter K. Hirsch	Zhigang Wang	September 24, 2001	87A
While playing a nonsensical Choose Your Own Adventure-esque game, Brain questions the game's knowledge of science and is challenged as to whether or not he could survive out in the wild, so he plans a camping trip. However, his friends and even Mr. Ratburn seem more interested in playing the game.
87a	2a	"Arthur Plays the Blues"	Catherine Lieuwen	Jeremy O'Neill	October 1, 2001	88A
Arthur's piano teacher is retiring, so he gets a strict new teacher, Dr. Fugue. When Arthur fails to practice sufficiently, Dr. Fugue reluctantly fires him. Wanting to be rehired, Arthur begins practicing the piece he was supposed to.
87b	2b	"Buster's Sweet Success"	Nick Raposo	Robert Yap	October 1, 2001	88B
Buster tries selling chocolates for a school fundraiser, but he ends up eating all of them. Since he does not have the money to pay for them, he opts to make and sell his own chocolates to pay off his debt, but they end up tasting awful. Mr. Haney gives Buster another chance by having him work in Jack's Joke Shop for a weekend.
88a	3a	"Prunella's Special Edition"	Matthew Lane	Robert Yap	October 8, 2001	90B
Prunella is excited to get her new monogrammed Henry Skreever book in the mail, but finds that it is in Braille. When she goes to the library to get the book with words, she meets and makes friends with a blind girl named Marina, who is looking for the same book in Braille.
88b	3b	"The Secret Life of Dogs and Babies"	Peter K. Hirsch	Patricia Atchinson & Elie Klimos	October 8, 2001	87B
Kate and Pal can understand each other and talk in full sentences when the other Reads are not around them, but older people like the rest of the Read family can't. When Mr. Read loses the figurine that goes on top of a cake he made for Muffy's cousin's wedding, Kate and Pal work together to get the figurine back on top of the cake before the wedding starts.
89a	4a	"Muffy's Soccer Shocker"	Matt Steinglass	Lyndon Ruddy & Patricia Atchinson	October 15, 2001	89A
Ed is the new soccer coach, but the kids, especially Muffy, doubt his coaching methods. Muffy can't keep up with Ed's training drills and fears her team will lose all future games with her being goalie.
89b	4b	"Brother, Can You Spare a Clarinet?"	Dietrich Smith	Jeremy O'Neill & Stefanie Gignac	October 15, 2001	90A
Binky performs poorly with his malfunctioning clarinet and his family can't afford a new one, so he starts a scheme with the other Tough Customers to get rid of music by making so-called modifications to his classmates' instruments and using a megaphone and his clarinet to disrupt tryouts for the Young Person's Orchestra.
90a	5a	"The Boy Who Cried Comet"	Peter K. Hirsch	Elie Klimos & Zhigang Wang	October 22, 2001	89B
Buster thinks he has seen UFOs, but Arthur, Fern, and the Brain do not believe him. So Buster borrows Muffy's telescope and finds a comet headed for Earth. Nobody believes him again, but when the Brain confirms it, everyone panics until Fern notices a piece is missing on the telescope, and it alters the telescope's findings, showing the comet has no chance of hitting Earth.
90b	5b	"Arthur and Los Vecinos"	Cusi Cram	Patricia Atchinson & Elie Klimos	October 22, 2001	91B
A new Hispanic family, the Molinas, move in next to the Reads after their former neighbor, Mr. Sipple, moves away. The Molinas have two children, Alberto and Vicita. Arthur is worried that Alberto will be mean to him, while D.W. is frustrated that Vicita wins at every game they play. They both find common ground with their new neighbors when they realize they share many common interests.
91a	6a	"Citizen Frensky"	Jacqui Deegan	Jeremy O'Neill	October 29, 2001	92B
Francine creates her own newspaper after shadowing Bitzi at work and becomes a tabloid writer, taking out-of-context pictures of her friends with insulting captions. When Francine finds an embarrassing picture of her circulating the school, she finds that Catherine is behind it, and understands how her friends felt.
91b	6b	"D.W.'s Backpack Mishap"	Cusi Cram	Jeremy O'Neill	October 29, 2001	86A
D.W. accidentally grabs the wrong backpack at the pool―due to most of the letters on the name tag having rubbed off, they spell out a nonsensical name, "Omble". Arthur and D.W. examine the contents of the backpack, and the mysterious "Omble" is later revealed to be Tommy Tibble.
92a	7a	"The Boy with His Head in the Clouds"	Peter K. Hirsch	Robert Yap	November 5, 2001	92A
George learns that he has dyslexia and does not want anyone to think he is dumb. He takes Binky to be his mentor to teach him to be more hard-headed so no one will tease him, but realizes he was not meant for being tough. Luckily, Mr. Ratburn helps him figure out how to get past his dyslexia, and George's confidence improves.
92b	7b	"More!"	Dietrich Smith	Elie Klimos & Patricia Atchinson	November 5, 2001	93B
D.W. is excited to be getting an allowance, but is aggressive when she learns that Emily and the Tibbles have already been getting an allowance and have more money. When she fails to get a bigger allowance, she pretends that she gets more money than they do since they do not know how much she gets.
93a	8a	"Rhyme for Your Life"	Peter K. Hirsch	Robert Yap	November 12, 2001	94A
Binky tries to write a poem for Mrs. Barnes's birthday, but he cannot think of the right words. That night, he has a dream where he finds himself in a village where it is against the law to speak in prose. The next morning, he unintentionally starts speaking in rhyme and continues to do so for the next week.
93b	8b	"For Whom the Bell Tolls"	Kathy Waugh	Stefanie Gignac	November 12, 2001	91A
Arthur is overjoyed that D.W. has laryngitis, but his mood changes when he has to do what she wants him to do, especially when he has to be a translator. When he discovers that D.W. is better but continues faking sick, he gets his friends to come up with a plan to expose her fib by making her think she is deaf and Francine is jealous of Arthur.
94a	9a	"The Good Sport"	Kathy Waugh	Jeremy O'Neill	November 19, 2001	94B
Michelle Kwan is presenting the Athlete of the Year Award, and Jenna wins, making Francine very upset. With Muffy's help, Francine tries to prove that she deserves the award by pretending to act like a good sport and giving Jenna special attention, but nothing works. Guest star: Michelle Kwan as herself.
94b	9b	"Crushed"	Catherine Lieuwen	Lyndon Ruddy, Robert Yap & Jeremy O'Neill	November 19, 2001	95A
Arthur develops a crush on his new babysitter, Sally, after playing a video game with her. His mood soon changes when he discovers that she has a boyfriend and refuses to see her again. However, when Buster invites Arthur over for a sleepover, Arthur discovers that Sally is babysitting for Buster. She tells Arthur that she enjoys playing video games more with him, as her boyfriend is bad at video games. Note: This episode was dedicated to Patricia "Pat" Harris, the mother of Jennifer Kirk (who did the sister episode's "A Word From Us Kids" segment).
95a	10a	"Arthur Loses His Marbles"	Nick Raposo	Alex Hawley & Elie Klimos	November 26, 2001	95B
Muffy's new marbles prompt Arthur and his friends to start playing in a marbles tournament. Arthur is trained by Grandma Thora, a former professional marbles player herself, but when he discovers that he has to compete against Grandma Thora in the marbles tournament, he plays poorly on purpose, so Grandma Thora forfeits when she finds out what is happening.
95b	10b	"Friday the 13th"	Gerard Lewis	Alex Hawley & Lyndon Ruddy	November 26, 2001	93A
The Brain does not believe in superstitions and tries to prove his hypothesis by doing things superstitiously believed to bring bad luck, like walking under a ladder, stepping on a crack, and destroying a mirror. Counter to his hypothesis, a streak of bad luck strikes. The Brain goes to Buster to get lucky charms, but during a baseball game on Friday the 13th, the Brain forgets the charms and hits a home run that wins his team the game, proving his hypothesis.
