= List of Arthur episodes =

This is a list of episodes for the television series Arthur.

During the course of the series, Arthur aired a total of 253 episodes and 7 specials. The series began airing on October 7, 1996, and ended on February 21, 2022. Seasons 1–15 were produced by Cookie Jar Group (seasons 1–8 as CINAR, seasons 9–15 as Cookie Jar Entertainment after the CINAR–Cookie Jar rebrand), seasons 16–19 by 9 Story Media Group (after Cookie Jar merged with DHX Media), and seasons 20–25 by Oasis Animation, along with 4 new hour-long television specials. Seven television specials aired in 2000, 2002, 2017 (2 specials), 2020 (2 specials), 2021, and a CGI movie released in 2006, titled Arthur's Missing Pal.

== Series overview ==
Season	Segments	Episodes	Originally released		
Season	Segments	Episodes	First released	Last released	Network
1	60	30	October 7, 1996	November 15, 1996	PTV
2	40	20	October 20, 1997	April 17, 1998	PTV
3	30	15	November 16, 1998	January 1, 1999	PTV
4	20	10	October 4, 1999	October 18, 1999	PBS Kids
5	20	10	September 25, 2000	November 27, 2000	PBS Kids
6	20	10	September 24, 2001	November 26, 2001	PBS Kids
7	18	10	October 8, 2002	November 29, 2002	PBS Kids
8	19	10	September 15, 2003	December 26, 2003	PBS Kids
9	20	10	December 27, 2004	April 8, 2005	PBS Kids Go!
10	19	10	May 15, 2006	May 26, 2006	PBS Kids Go!
11	19	10	June 25, 2007	September 7, 2007	PBS Kids Go!
12	20	10	October 6, 2008	April 24, 2009	PBS Kids Go!
13	19	10	October 12, 2009	April 9, 2010	PBS Kids Go!
14	20	10	October 11, 2010	April 29, 2011	PBS Kids Go!
15	19	10	October 10, 2011	June 15, 2012	PBS Kids Go!
16	19	10	October 15, 2012	May 10, 2013	PBS Kids
17	20	10	November 11, 2013	May 14, 2014	PBS Kids
18	19	10	September 29, 2014	September 10, 2015	PBS Kids
19	19	10	June 2, 2015	May 26, 2016	PBS Kids
20	14	7	October 10, 2016	June 1, 2017	PBS Kids
21	13	7	October 24, 2017	February 15, 2018	PBS Kids
22	8	4	May 13, 2019	May 16, 2019	PBS Kids
23	5	3	September 30, 2019	October 2, 2019	PBS Kids
24	5	3	March 8, 2021	March 10, 2021	PBS Kids
25	8	4	February 21, 2022		PBS Kids

== Episodes ==
=== Season 1 (1996) ===
No. overall	No. in season	Title	Written by	Storyboard by	Original release date	Prod. code
1a	1a	"Arthur's Eyes"	Joe Fallon	Gerry Capelle	October 7, 1996	1A
1b	1b	"Francine's Bad Hair Day"	Kathy Waugh	Jean Sarô	October 7, 1996	2A
2a	2a	"Arthur and the Real Mr. Ratburn" "Arthur's Teacher Trouble"	Joe Fallon	John Pagan & Norm Roen	October 8, 1996	3B
2b	2b	"Arthur's Spelling Trubble"	Joe Fallon	Jean Lajeunesse	October 8, 1996	6B
3a	3a	"D.W. All Wet"	Kathy Waugh	Sylvain Proteau	October 9, 1996	7B
3b	3b	"Buster's Dino Dilemma"	Matt Steinglass	Raymond Lebrun	October 9, 1996	17B
4a	4a	"D.W.'s Imaginary Friend"	Ken Scarborough	Sylvain Proteau	October 10, 1996	1B
4b	4b	"Arthur's Lost Library Book"	Joe Fallon	Jean Lajeunesse	October 10, 1996	22B
5a	5a	"Arthur's Pet Business"	Joe Fallon	Jean Lajeunesse	October 11, 1996	3A
5b	5b	"D.W. the Copycat"	Joe Fallon	Stéfanie Gignac	October 11, 1996	23A
6a	6a	"Locked in the Library!"	Kathy Waugh	John Flagg	October 14, 1996	10A
6b	6b	"Arthur Accused!"	James Greenberg	Jean Sarô	October 14, 1996	9B
7a	7a	"Arthur Goes to Camp"	Rowby Goren	Sylvain Proteau	October 15, 1996	4A
7b	7b	"Buster Makes the Grade"	Peter K. Hirsch	Nadja Cozic	October 15, 1996	18A
8a	8a	"Arthur's New Puppy"	Joe Fallon	Hana Kukal	October 16, 1996	5A
8b	8b	"Arthur Bounces Back"	Tom Hertz	John Flagg	October 16, 1996	12A
9a	9a	"Arthur Babysits"	Joe Fallon	Gerry Capelle	October 17, 1996	7A
9b	9b	"Arthur's Cousin Catastrophe"	Terence Taylor	Jean Charles Fink	October 17, 1996	16A
10a	10a	"Arthur's Birthday"	Joe Fallon	Stéfanie Gignac	October 18, 1996	11A
10b	10b	"Francine Frensky, Superstar"	Joe Fallon	Darren Brereton	October 18, 1996	18B
11a	11a	"Arthur's Baby"	Joe Fallon	Gerry Capelle	October 21, 1996	19B
11b	11b	"D.W.'s Baby"	Joe Fallon	Gerry Capelle	October 21, 1996	21A
12a	12a	"Arthur Writes a Story"	Joe Fallon	Gerry Capelle	October 22, 1996	8B
12b	12b	"Arthur's Lost Dog"	Joe Fallon	Sylvian Proteau	October 22, 1996	9A
13a	13a	"So Long, Spanky"	Peter K. Hirsch	Jean Lajeunesse	October 23, 1996	14B
13b	13b	"Buster's New Friend"	Matt Steinglass	Jean Lajeunesse	October 23, 1996	19A
14a	14a	"Arthur the Wrecker"	Joe Fallon	Stéfanie Gignac	October 24, 1996	21B
14b	14b	"Arthur and the True Francine"	Kathy Waugh	Angus Bungay	October 24, 1996	13B
15a	15a	"Arthur's Family Vacation"	Thomas LaPierre	François Brisson	October 25, 1996	2B
15b	15b	"Grandpa Dave's Old Country Farm"	Matt Steinglass	John Pagan & Norm Roen	October 25, 1996	8A
16a	16a	"Arthur and the Crunch Cereal Contest"	Peter K. Hirsch	Jean Lajeunesse	October 28, 1996	11B
16b	16b	"D.W. Flips"	Peter K. Hirsch	Gerry Capelle	October 28, 1996	23B
17a	17a	"Meek for a Week"	Joe Fallon	Jean Charles Fink	October 29, 1996	20B
17b	17b	"Arthur, World's Greatest Gleeper"	Matt Steinglass	Myron Born	October 29, 1996	6A
18a	18a	"Arthur's Chicken Pox"	Kathy Waugh	Russel Crispin	October 30, 1996	5B
18b	18b	"Sick as a Dog"	Joe Fallon	Jean Charles Fink	October 30, 1996	24A
19a	19a	"D.W. Rides Again"	Joe Fallon	Gerry Capelle	October 31, 1996	14A
19b	19b	"Arthur Makes the Team"	Tom Hertz	Jean Lajeunesse	October 31, 1996	24B
20a	20a	"Arthur's Almost Boring Day"	Joe Fallon	Stefanie Gignac	November 1, 1996	15B
20b	20b	"The Half-Baked Sale"	Ken Scarborough	Jean Lajeunesse	November 1, 1996	26B
21a	21a	"Sue Ellen Moves In"	Joe Fallon	Gerry Capelle	November 4, 1996	27B
21b	21b	"The Perfect Brother"	Joe Fallon	Stefanie Gignac	November 4, 1996	25B
22a	22a	"D.W.'s Snow Mystery"	Joe Fallon	Gerry Capelle	November 5, 1996	15A
22b	22b	"Team Trouble"	Joe Fallon	Gerry Capelle	November 5, 1996	25A
23a	23a	"Bully for Binky"	Joe Fallon	Gerry Capelle	November 6, 1996	12B
23b	23b	"Misfortune Teller"	Joe Fallon	Luc Savoie	November 6, 1996	26A
24a	24a	"Arthur's Tooth"	James Greenberg	Jean Charles Fink	November 7, 1996	13A
24b	24b	"D.W. Gets Lost"	Joe Fallon	Kevin Currie	November 7, 1996	22A
25a	25a	"D.W. Thinks Big"	Judy Rothman	Gerry Capelle	November 8, 1996	4B
25b	25b	"Arthur Cleans Up"	Matt Steinglass	Jean Charles Fink	November 8, 1996	27A
26a	26a	"My Dad, the Garbage Man"	Kathy Waugh	Jean Sarô	November 11, 1996	20A
26b	26b	"Poor Muffy"	Ken Scarborough	Gerry Capelle	November 11, 1996	29B
27a	27a	"D.W.'s Blankie"	Tom Hertz	Stéfanie Gignac	November 12, 1996	17A
27b	27b	"Arthur's Substitute Teacher Trouble"	Joe Fallon	Nadja Cozic	November 12, 1996	28A
28a	28a	"I'm a Poet"	Joe Fallon	Kevin Currie	November 13, 1996	28B
28b	28b	"The Scare-Your-Pants-Off Club!"	Terence Taylor	Angus Bungay	November 13, 1996	10B
29a	29a	"My Club Rules"	Joe Fallon	Gerry Capelle	November 14, 1996	30B
29b	29b	"Stolen Bike"	Kathy Waugh	Angus Bungay	November 14, 1996	30A
30a	30a	"Arthur's First Sleepover"	Joe Fallon	Jean Lajeunesse	November 15, 1996	16B
30b	30b	"Arthur's New Year's Eve"	Joe Fallon	Darren Brereton	November 15, 1996	29A

=== Season 2 (1997–98) ===
No. overall	No. in season	Title	Written by	Storyboard by	Original release date	Prod. code
31a	1a	"Arthur Meets Mister Rogers"	Ken Scarborough	Denis Banville	October 20, 1997	39B
31b	1b	"Draw!"	Joe Fallon	Eric Bergeron & Gerry Capelle	October 20, 1997	34A
32a	2a	"Binky Barnes, Art Expert"	Joe Fallon	Harry Rasmussen	October 21, 1997	34B
32b	2b	"Arthur's Lucky Pencil"	Peter K. Hirsch	Stéfanie Gignac	October 21, 1997	31A
33a	3a	"D.W., the Picky Eater"	Anne-Marie Perrotta	Denis Banville	October 22, 1997	33B
33b	3b	"Buster and the Daredevils"	Peter K. Hirsch	Grace Lam	October 22, 1997	37A
34a	4a	"Arthur Makes a Movie"	Peter K. Hirsch	Robert Yap	October 23, 1997	38A
34b	4b	"Go to Your Room, D.W."	Kathy Waugh	Alex Szewczuk	October 23, 1997	32B
35a	5a	"Arthur's Underwear"	Peter K. Hirsch	Jean Lajeunesse	October 24, 1997	33A
35b	5b	"Francine Frensky, Olympic Rider"	Kathy Waugh	Denis Banville	October 24, 1997	37B
36a	6a	"Buster Baxter, Cat Saver"	Joe Fallon	Denis Banville	October 27, 1997	35B
36b	6b	"Play it Again, D.W."	Joe Fallon	Harry Rasmussen	October 27, 1997	38B
37a	7a	"Arthur's TV-Free Week"	Peter K. Hirsch	Stéfanie Gignac	October 28, 1997	32A
37b	7b	"Night Fright"	Joe Fallon	Gerry Capelle	October 28, 1997	31B
38a	8a	"Arthur vs. the Piano"	Joe Fallon	Harry Rasmussen	October 29, 1997	36B
38b	8b	"The Big Blow-Up"	Joe Fallon	Alex Hawley	October 29, 1997	36A
39a	9a	"Lost!"	Kathy Waugh	Gerry Capelle	October 30, 1997	40A
39b	9b	"The Short, Quick Summer"	Joe Fallon	Denis Banville	October 30, 1997	40B
40a	10a	"D.W. Goes to Washington"	Joe Fallon	Gerry Capelle	October 31, 1997	39A
40b	10b	"Arthur's Mystery Envelope"	Sheilarae Carpentier Lau	Gary Scott & Nelson Dewey	October 31, 1997	35A
41a	11a	"D.W.'s Deer Friend"	Joe Fallon	Robert Yap	April 6, 1998	44B
41b	11b	"Buster Hits the Books"	Joe Fallon	Jeremy O'Neill & Ivan Tankushev	April 6, 1998	50B
42a	12a	"Arthur's Faraway Friend"	Joe Fallon	Brian Anderson	April 7, 1998	43A
42b	12b	"Arthur and the Square Dance"	Peter K. Hirsch	Gerry Capelle	April 7, 1998	41A
43a	13a	"Water and the Brain"	Peter K. Hirsch	Robert Yap	April 8, 1998	42B
43b	13b	"Arthur the Unfunny"	Joe Fallon	Stéfanie Gignac	April 8, 1998	41B
44a	14a	"Sue Ellen's Lost Diary"	Peter K. Hirsch	Ivan Tankushev	April 9, 1998	45B
44b	14b	"Arthur's Knee"	Sheilarae Carpentier Lau	Marisol Gagnon & M. Cuadrado	April 9, 1998	44A
45a	15a	"Grandma Thora Appreciation Day"	Kathy Waugh	Angus Bungay	April 10, 1998	42A
45b	15b	"Fern's Slumber Party"	Sandra Willard	Nelson Dewey	April 10, 1998	43B
46a	16a	"Love Notes for Muffy"	Sandra Willard	Robert Yap	April 13, 1998	48A
46b	16b	"D.W. Blows the Whistle"	Barry Rinehart & Ian Saunders	Robert Yap	April 13, 1998	50A
47a	17a	"Francine Redecorates"	Sandra Willard	Stéfanie Gignac	April 14, 1998	45A
47b	17b	"Arthur the Loser"	Joe Fallon	Brian Anderson	April 14, 1998	48B
48a	18a	"Arthur vs. the Very Mean Crossing Guard"	Ken Scarborough	Gerry Capelle & Marisol Gagnon	April 15, 1998	47A
48b	18b	"D.W.'s Very Bad Mood"	Kathy Waugh	Guy Lamoureux & Robert Yap	April 15, 1998	49A
49a	19a	"D.W.'s Name Game"	Joe Fallon	Robert Yap	April 16, 1998	46A
49b	19b	"Finders Key-pers"	Chris Moore	Stéfanie Gignac	April 16, 1998	49B
50a	20a	"How the Cookie Crumbles"	Joe Fallon	Brian Anderson	April 17, 1998	46B
50b	20b	"Sue Ellen's Little Sister"	Peter K. Hirsch	Stéfanie Gignac	April 17, 1998	47B

=== Season 3 (1998–99) ===
No. overall	No. in season	Title	Written by	Storyboard by	Original release date	Prod. code
51a	1a	"Buster's Back"	Joe Fallon	Gerry Capelle	November 16, 1998	51B
51b	1b	"The Ballad of Buster Baxter"	Joe Fallon	Stéfanie Gignac	November 16, 1998	52A
52a	2a	"D.W. All Fired Up"	Peter K. Hirsch	Stéfanie Gignac	November 17, 1998	56B
52b	2b	"I'd Rather Read It Myself"	Joe Fallon	Robert Yap	November 17, 1998	55B
53a	3a	"Arthur Goes Crosswire"	Chris Moore	Nick Rijgersberg & Jeremy O'Neill	November 18, 1998	53A
53b	3b	"Sue Ellen and the Brainasaurous"	Chris Moore & Ken Scarborough	Robert Yap	November 18, 1998	57B
54a	4a	"Background Blues"	Peter K. Hirsch	Robert Yap	November 19, 1998	53B
54b	4b	"And Now Let's Talk to Some Kids"	Joe Fallon	Stéfanie Gignac	November 19, 1998	58B
55a	5a	"The Chips Are Down"	Joe Fallon	Stéfanie Gignac	November 20, 1998	54B
55b	5b	"Revenge of the Chip"	Dietrich Smith	Mario Cabrera	November 20, 1998	56B
56a	6a	"Binky Rules"	Sandra Willard	Robert Yap	November 23, 1998	51A
56b	6b	"Meet Binky"	Sandra Willard	Jeremy O'Neill & Larry Jacobs	November 23, 1998	55A
57a	7a	"Arthur Rides the Bandwagon"	Peter K. Hirsch	Robert Shedlowich & Mario Cabrera	November 24, 1998	52B
57b	7b	"Dad's Dessert Dilemma"	Sandra Willard	Jeremy O'Neill & Alex Greychuck	November 24, 1998	59A
58a	8a	"Popular Girls"	Sandra Willard	Jeremy O'Neill	November 25, 1998	57A
58b	8b	"Buster's Growing Grudge"	Joe Fallon	Robert Yap & Daniel Decelles	November 25, 1998	60B
59a	9a	"Arthur's Treasure Hunt"	Stephen Krensky	Mario Cabrera & Rich Vanatte	November 26, 1998	54A
59b	9b	"The Return of the King"	Peter K. Hirsch	Mario Cabrera	November 26, 1998	61B
60a	10a	"Attack of the Turbo Tibbles"	Joe Fallon	Robert Yap	November 27, 1998	58A
60b	10b	"D.W. Tricks the Tooth Fairy"	Joe Fallon	Stéfanie Gignac	November 27, 1998	60A
61a	11a	"Double Tibble Trouble"	Peter K. Hirsch	Stéfanie Gignac	December 28, 1998	65A
61b	11b	"Arthur's Almost Live Not Real Music Festival"	Joe Fallon & Ken Scarborough	Robert Yap	December 28, 1998	65B
62a	12a	"What Scared Sue Ellen?"	Bruce Akiyama	Stéfanie Gignac	December 29, 1998	62B
62b	12b	"Clarissa is Cracked"	Sandra Willard	Bulent Karabagli & Marcos Da Silva	December 29, 1998	63B
63a	13a	"Arthur's Dummy Disaster"	Peter K. Hirsch	Mario Cabrera	December 30, 1998	59B
63b	13b	"Francine and the Feline"	Sandra Willard	Robert Yap	December 30, 1998	61A
64a	14a	"Mom and Dad Have a Great Big Fight"	Joe Fallon	Robert Yap	December 31, 1998	63A
64b	14b	"D.W.'s Perfect Wish"	Joe Fallon	Stéfanie Gignac	December 31, 1998	64A
65a	15a	"Arthur and D.W. Clean Up"	Anne-Marie Perrotta & Tean Schultz	Robert Yap & Jeremy O'Neill	January 1, 1999	64B
65b	15b	"The Long, Dull Winter"	Joe Fallon	Jeremy O'Neill	January 1, 1999	62A

=== Season 4 (1999) ===
No. overall	No. in season	Title	Written by	Storyboard by	Original release date	Prod. code
66a	1a	"D.W.'s Library Card"	Peter K. Hirsch	Mario Cabrera	October 4, 1999	67B
66b	1b	"Arthur's Big Hit"	Joe Fallon	Robert Yap	October 4, 1999	68A
67a	2a	"Hide and Snake"	Bruce Akiyama	Stefanie Gignac	October 5, 1999	67A
67b	2b	"Muffy's New Best Friend"	Dietrich Smith	Stefanie Gignac	October 5, 1999	70B
68a	3a	"Buster's Breathless"	Written by : Peter K. Hirsch; Idea by : Steve Viksten	Michel Magnan & Alex Hawley	October 7, 1999	69A
68b	3b	"The Fright Stuff"	Bruce Akiyama	Jeremy O'Neill	October 7, 1999	66A
69a	4a	"The Contest"	Ken Scarborough	Robert Yap	October 8, 1999	66B
69b	4b	"Prove It"	Joe Fallon	Jeremy O'Neill	October 8, 1999	71A
70a	5a	"The Blizzard"	Joe Fallon	Alex Hawley	October 11, 1999	73A
70b	5b	"The Rat Who Came to Dinner"	Joe Fallon	Maria Astadjova & Jeremy O'Neill	October 11, 1999	69B
71a	6a	"D.W. Tale Spins"	Joe Fallon	Stefanie Gignac	October 12, 1999	74B
71b	6b	"Prunella Gets It Twice"	Joe Fallon	Michel Magnan & Peter Huggan	October 12, 1999	68B
72a	7a	"Binky Barnes, Wingman"	Bruce Akiyama	Robert Yap	October 13, 1999	74A
72b	7b	"To Beat or Not to Beat"	Barney Saltzberg	Jeremy O'Neill	October 13, 1999	71B
73a	8a	"1001 Dads"	Peter K. Hirsch	Robert Yap	October 14, 1999	72B
73b	8b	"Prunella's Prediction"	Jennifer Barnes	Stefanie Gignac	October 14, 1999	72A
74a	9a	"What is that Thing?"	Peter K. Hirsch	Jeremy O'Neill & Emmanuelle Gignac	October 15, 1999	73B
74b	9b	"Buster's Best Behavior"	Gerard Lewis	Robert Yap, David Thrasher & Guylaine Seguin	October 15, 1999	75A
75a	10a	"My Music Rules"	Ken Scarborough	Alex Hawley, Robert Yap & Stefanie Gignac	October 18, 1999	75B
75b	10b	"That's a Baby Show!"	Joe Fallon	Robert Yap	October 18, 1999	70A

=== Season 5 (2000) ===
No. overall	No. in season	Title	Written by	Storyboard by	Original release date	Prod. code
76a	1a	"Arthur and the Big Riddle"	Peter K. Hirsch	Robert Yap	September 25, 2000	78A
76b	1b	"Double Dare"	Kathy Waugh	Guylaine Seguin, Lyndon Ruddy & Greg Huculak	September 25, 2000	77B
77a	2a	"Kids Are From Earth, Parents Are From Pluto"	Peter K. Hirsch	Mario Cabrera, Patricia Atchison & Marie Blanchard	October 2, 2000	76A
77b	2b	"Nerves of Steal"	Bruce Akiyama	Eric Bergeron, Greg Huculak & Patricia Atchison	October 2, 2000	78B
78a	3a	"It's a No-Brainer"	Dietrich Smith	Robert Yap	October 9, 2000	76B
78b	3b	"The Shore Thing"	Bruce Akiyama	Zoran Vanjaka	October 9, 2000	77A
79a	4a	"The World Record"	Gerard Lewis	Lyndon Ruddy & Helene Cossette	October 16, 2000	81B
79b	4b	"The Cave"	Joseph Purdy	Nick Vallinakis & Zoran Vanjaka	October 16, 2000	81A
80a	5a	"The Lousy Week"	Peter K. Hirsch	Stefanie Gignac & Patricia Atchison	October 23, 2000	80A
80b	5b	"You Are Arthur"	Peter K. Hirsch	Robert Yap	October 23, 2000	82A
81a	6a	"The Election"	Joseph Purdy	Robert Yap	October 30, 2000	80B
81b	6b	"Francine Goes to War"	Kathy Waugh	Lyndon Ruddy & Patricia Atchison	October 30, 2000	79B
82a	7a	"Sleep No More"	Dietrich Smith	Stefanie Gignac	November 6, 2000	82B
82b	7b	"Pet Peeved"	Bruce Akiyama	Lyndon Ruddy, Guylaine Seguin & Eric St. Gelais	November 6, 2000	83B
83a	8a	"The Last of Mary Moo Cow"	Dietrich Smith	Zoran Vanjaka	November 13, 2000	79A
83b	8b	"Bitzi's Beau"	Peter K. Hirsch	John Delaney, Nick Vallinakis & Elie Klimos	November 13, 2000	83A
84a	9a	"Just Desserts"	Written by : Peter K. Hirsch; Idea by : Bruce Akiyama	Stefanie Gignac	November 20, 2000	84B
84b	9b	"The Big Dig" "Grandpa Dave's Great Big Lie"	Kathy Waugh	Elie Klimos, Angus Bungay, Guylaine Seguin, Eric St. Gelais, & Zhigang Wang	November 20, 2000	85A
85a	10a	"Arthur's Family Feud"	Peter K. Hirsch	Stéfanie Gignac & Robert Yap	November 27, 2000	85B
85b	10b	"Muffy Gets Mature"	Michelle Lamoreaux	Robert Yap	November 27, 2000	84A

=== Season 6 (2001) ===
No. overall	No. in season	Title	Written by	Storyboard by	Original release date	Prod. code
86a	1a	"Sue Ellen Gets Her Goose Cooked"	Written by : Peter K. Hirsch; Idea by : Bill Shribman	Robert Yap	September 24, 2001	86B
86b	1b	"Best of the Nest"	Peter K. Hirsch	Zhigang Wang	September 24, 2001	87A
87a	2a	"Arthur Plays the Blues"	Catherine Lieuwen	Jeremy O'Neill	October 1, 2001	88A
87b	2b	"Buster's Sweet Success"	Nick Raposo	Robert Yap	October 1, 2001	88B
88a	3a	"Prunella's Special Edition"	Matthew Lane	Robert Yap	October 8, 2001	90B
88b	3b	"The Secret Life of Dogs and Babies"	Peter K. Hirsch	Patricia Atchinson & Elie Klimos	October 8, 2001	87B
89a	4a	"Muffy's Soccer Shocker"	Matt Steinglass	Lyndon Ruddy & Patricia Atchinson	October 15, 2001	89A
89b	4b	"Brother, Can You Spare a Clarinet?"	Dietrich Smith	Jeremy O'Neill & Stefanie Gignac	October 15, 2001	90A
90a	5a	"The Boy Who Cried Comet"	Peter K. Hirsch	Elie Klimos & Zhigang Wang	October 22, 2001	89B
90b	5b	"Arthur and Los Vecinos"	Cusi Cram	Patricia Atchinson & Elie Klimos	October 22, 2001	91B
91a	6a	"Citizen Frensky"	Jacqui Deegan	Jeremy O'Neill	October 29, 2001	92B
91b	6b	"D.W.'s Backpack Mishap"	Cusi Cram	Jeremy O'Neill	October 29, 2001	86A
92a	7a	"The Boy with His Head in the Clouds"	Peter K. Hirsch	Robert Yap	November 5, 2001	92A
92b	7b	"More!"	Dietrich Smith	Elie Klimos & Patricia Atchinson	November 5, 2001	93B
93a	8a	"Rhyme for Your Life"	Peter K. Hirsch	Robert Yap	November 12, 2001	94A
93b	8b	"For Whom the Bell Tolls"	Kathy Waugh	Stefanie Gignac	November 12, 2001	91A
94a	9a	"The Good Sport"	Kathy Waugh	Jeremy O'Neill	November 19, 2001	94B
94b	9b	"Crushed"	Catherine Lieuwen	Lyndon Ruddy, Robert Yap & Jeremy O'Neill	November 19, 2001	95A
95a	10a	"Arthur Loses His Marbles"	Nick Raposo	Alex Hawley & Elie Klimos	November 26, 2001	95B
95b	10b	"Friday the 13th"	Gerard Lewis	Alex Hawley & Lyndon Ruddy	November 26, 2001	93A

=== Season 7 (2002) ===
No. overall	No. in season	Title	Written by	Storyboard by	Original release date	Prod. code
96a	1a	"Cast Away"	Dietrich Smith	Gerry Capelle	October 8, 2002	97B
96b	1b	"The Great Sock Mystery"	Peter K. Hirsch	Stefanie Gignac	October 8, 2002	98B
97a	2a	"Francine's Split Decision"	Peter Egan	Stefanie Gignac	October 9, 2002	96B
97b	2b	"Muffy Goes Metropolitan"	Matthew Lane	Jeremy O'Neill	October 9, 2002	97A
98a	3a	"Ants in Arthur's Pants"	Glen Berger	Robert Yap	October 10, 2002	96A
98b	3b	"Don't Ask Muffy"	Cusi Cram	Gerry Capelle	October 10, 2002	100A
99a	4a	"To Tibble the Truth"	Gerard Lewis & Peter K. Hirsch	Robert Yap	October 11, 2002	98A
99b	4b	"Waiting to Go"	Glen Berger	Robert Yap	October 11, 2002	100B
100	5	"Elwood City Turns 100!"	Peter K. Hirsch & Matthew Lane	Jeremy O'Neill & Robert Yap	October 14, 2002	101A 102A
101a	6a	"Pick a Car, Any Car"	Peter Egan	Jeremy O'Neill	November 25, 2002	99B
101b	6b	"Jenna's Bedtime Blues"	Glen Berger	Jean Saro & Sylvie Lafrance	November 25, 2002	103A
102a	7a	"D.W.'s Time Trouble"	Dietrich Smith	Gerry Capelle	November 26, 2002	102B
102b	7b	"Buster's Amish Mismatch"	Peter Egan	Jean Saro & Sylvie Lafrance	November 26, 2002	101B
103a	8a	"The World of Tomorrow"	Peter Egan	Robert Yap	November 27, 2002	104A
103b	8b	"Is There a Doctor in the House?"	Nick Raposo	Gerry Capelle	November 27, 2002	99A
104a	9a	"Prunella Sees the Light"	Peter K. Hirsch	Jeremy O'Neill	November 28, 2002	103B
104b	9b	"Return of the Snowball"	Dietrich Smith	Gerry Capelle	November 28, 2002	104B
105	10	"April 9th"	Peter K. Hirsch	Gerry Capelle & Jeremy O'Neill	November 29, 2002	105

=== Season 8 (2003) ===
No. overall	No. in season	Title	Written by	Storyboard by	Original release date	Prod. code
106a	1a	"Dear Adil"	Peter K. Hirsch	Ivan Tankushev	September 15, 2003	106B
106b	1b	"Bitzi's Break Up"	Peter K. Hirsch	Jeremy O'Neill	September 15, 2003	110A
107a	2a	"Fernfern and the Secret of Moose Mountain"	Stephanie Simpson	Ivan Tankushev	September 16, 2003	108B
107b	2b	"Thanks a Lot, Binky"	Peter Egan	Julian Harris	September 16, 2003	107A
108a	3a	"Arthur's Snow Biz"	Jonathan Greenberg	Jeremy O'Neill	September 17, 2003	106A
108b	3b	"Bugged"	Jonathan Greenberg	Robert Yap	September 17, 2003	109A
109a	4a	"Fernkenstein's Monster"	Stephanie Simpson	Ivan Tankushev & Patricia Atchinson	September 18, 2003	110B
109b	4b	"D.W., Dancing Queen"	Glen Berger	Robert Yap	September 18, 2003	107B
110a	5a	"Vomitrocious"	Dietrich Smith	Julian Harris & Patricia Atchinson	September 19, 2003	111A
110b	5b	"Sue Ellen Chickens Out"	Peter Egan & Peter K. Hirsch	Robert Yap	September 19, 2003	111B
111	6	"Postcards from Buster"	Peter K. Hirsch	Jeremy O'Neill	December 22, 2003	112A 113B
112a	7a	"Desk Wars"	Glen Berger	Gerry Capelle	December 23, 2003	112B
112b	7b	"Desperately Seeking Stanley"	Cusi Cram	Julian Harris & Patricia Atchinson	December 23, 2003	109B
113a	8a	"Muffy's Art Attack"	Stephanie Simpson	Jeremy O'Neill	December 24, 2003	114A
113b	8b	"Tales from the Crib"	Jonathan Greenberg	Robert Yap & Julian Harris	December 24, 2003	113A
114a	9a	"Flea to Be You and Me"	Story by : Cusi Cram; Written by : Jonathan Greenberg	Gerry Capelle	December 25, 2003	114B
114b	9b	"Kiss and Tell"	Jacqui Deegan	Jeremy O'Neill & Julian Harris	December 25, 2003	115A
115a	10a	"Big Horns George"	Peter K. Hirsch	Gerry Capelle & Robert Yap	December 26, 2003	115B
115b	10b	"Bleep"	Dietrich Smith	Jeremy O'Neill	December 26, 2003	108A

=== Season 9 (2004–05) ===
No. overall	No. in season	Title	Written by	Storyboard by	Original release date	Prod. code
116a	1a	"Castles in the Sky"	Peter K. Hirsch	Jeremy O'Neill	December 27, 2004	116A
116b	1b	"Tipping the Scales"	Alan Silberberg	Robert Yap	December 27, 2004	119A
117a	2a	"Francine's Big Top Trouble"	Adam Felber	Ivan Tankushev	December 28, 2004	117B
117b	2b	"George Blows His Top"	Courtney Lilly	Gerry Capelle	December 28, 2004	116B
118a	3a	"Arthur Weighs In"	Raye Lankford	Francois Brisson	December 29, 2004	120A
118b	3b	"The Law of the Jungle Gym"	Matt Steinglass	Gerry Capelle, Ivan Tankushev & Francois Brisson	December 29, 2004	118A
119a	4a	"Buster's Green Thumb"	Written by : Peter K. Hirsch; Idea by : Catherine Lieuwen	Jeremy O'Neill	December 30, 2004	120B
119b	4b	"My Fair Tommy"	Dietrich Smith	Stéfanie Gignac	December 30, 2004	117A
120a	5a	"Lights, Camera... Opera!"	Peter K. Hirsch	Stéfanie Gignac	December 31, 2004	119A
120b	5b	"All Worked Up"	Daisy Scott	Jeremy O'Neill	December 31, 2004	118B
121a	6a	"Arthur Makes Waves"	Raye Lankford	Patricia Atchinson & Robert Yap	April 4, 2005	123A
121b	6b	"It Came from Beyond"	Peter K. Hirsch	Gerry Capelle	April 4, 2005	124B
122a	7a	"Three's a Crowd"	Hilary Selden Illick	Stéfanie Gignac	April 5, 2005	123B
122b	7b	"A is for Angry"	Dietrich Smith	Robert Yap	April 5, 2005	121A
123a	8a	"The "A" Team"	Daisy Scott	Jeremy O'Neill & Robert Yap	April 6, 2005	125A
123b	8b	"Emily Swallows a Horse"	Melissa Kirsch	Stèfanie Gignac	April 6, 2005	121B
124a	9a	"D.W. Beats All"	Raye Lankford & Ken Scarborough	Jeremy O'Neill	April 7, 2005	124A
124b	9b	"Buster the Myth Maker"	Matt Steinglass	Stéfanie Gignac	April 7, 2005	125B
125a	10a	"Binky Goes Nuts"	Cusi Cram	Gerry Capelle	April 8, 2005	122A
125b	10b	"Breezy Listening Blues"	Peter K. Kirsch	Jeremy O'Neill	April 8, 2005	122B

=== Season 10 (2006) ===
No. overall	No. in season	Title	Written by	Storyboard by	Original release date	Prod. code
126	1	"Happy Anniversary"	Peter K. Hirsch	Gerry Capelle & Elie Klimos	May 15, 2006	132A 133B
127a	2a	"The Squirrels"	Dietrich Smith	Jeremy O'Neill	May 16, 2006	128A
127b	2b	"Fern and Persimmony Glitchet"	Stephanie Simpson	Elie Klimos & Ivan Tankushev	May 16, 2006	127B
128a	3a	"Desert Island Dish"	Daisy Scott	Jeremy O'Neill	May 17, 2006	126A
128b	3b	"The Secret About Secrets"	Stephanie Simpson	Stéfanie Gignac	May 17, 2006	133A
129a	4a	"Feeling Flush"	Glen Berger	Gerry Capelle	May 18, 2006	126B
129b	4b	"Family Fortune"	Joel Barkow & Stephanie Simpson	Jeremy O'Neill	May 18, 2006	130B
130a	5a	"D.W. Aims High"	Rose Compagine	Gerry Capelle	May 19, 2006	130A
130b	5b	"Flaw and Order"	Gentry Menzel	Stéfanie Gignac	May 19, 2006	127A
131a	6a	"The Curse of the Grebes"	Stephanie Simpson	Elie Klimos & Jeremy O'Neill	May 22, 2006	135A
131b	6b	"Arthur Changes Gears"	Raye Lankford	Patricia Atchinson	May 22, 2006	128B
132a	7a	"Unfinished"	Dietrich Smith	Elie Klimos	May 23, 2006	131A
132b	7b	"D.W., Bossy Boots"	Raye Lankford	Stéfanie Gignac	May 23, 2006	131B
133a	8a	"Binky vs. Binky"	Raye Lankford	Patricia Atchinson	May 24, 2006	134A
133b	8b	"Operation: D.W.!"	Stephanie Simpson	Jeremy O'Neill	May 24, 2006	134B
134a	9a	"Do You Speak George?"	Peter K. Hirsch	Stéfanie Gignac	May 25, 2006	135B
134b	9b	"World Girls"	Hilary Illick	Jeremy O'Neill	May 25, 2006	132B
135a	10a	"What's Cooking?"	Hilary Illick	Stéfanie Gignac	May 26, 2006	129A
135b	10b	"Buster's Special Delivery"	Cusi Cram	Elie Klimos	May 26, 2006	129B

=== Season 11 (2007) ===
No. overall	No. in season	Title	Written by	Storyboard by	Original release date	Prod. code
136a	1a	"Swept Away"	Peter K. Hirsch	Jean Lacombe	June 25, 2007	137A
136b	1b	"Germophobia"	Dietrich Smith	Elie Klimos, Elise Benoît & Nick Vallinakis	June 25, 2007	137B
137a	2a	"Arthur Sells Out"	Raye Lankford	Ivan Tankushev	June 26, 2007	136A
137b	2b	"Mind Your Manners"	P. Kevin Strader	Robert Yap & Nick Vallinakis	June 26, 2007	142B
138a	3a	"Buenas Noches, Vicita"	Cusi Cram	Gerry Capelle	June 27, 2007	136B
138b	3b	"Prunella Packs It In"	Susan Kim	Elie Klimos, Elise Benoît & Jean Lajeunesse	June 27, 2007	139B
139a	4a	"Phony Fern"	Peter K. Hirsch	Gerry Capelle	June 28, 2007	138B
139b	4b	"Brain's Shocking Secret"	Glen Berger	Stéfanie Gignac	June 28, 2007	138A
140a	5a	"Baby Kate and the Imaginary Mystery"	Peter K. Hirsch	Elie Klimos & Elise Benoît	June 29, 2007	141B
140b	5b	"Strangers on a Train"	Gentry Menzel	Gerry Capelle	June 29, 2007	140B
141a	6a	"The Making of Arthur"	Peter K. Hirsch	Jeremy O'Neill	September 3, 2007	145B
141b	6b	"Dancing Fools"	Cusi Cram	Stéfanie Gignac & Nick Vallinakis	September 3, 2007	144A
142a	7a	"Hic or Treat"	Kathy Waugh	Robert Yap	September 4, 2007	144B
142b	7b	"Mr. Alwaysright"	Peter K. Hirsch	Jeremy O'Neill	September 4, 2007	143A
143a	8a	"Francine's Pilfered Paper"	Raye Lankford	Jean Lacombe, Ivan Tankushev & Robert Yap	September 5, 2007	139A
143b	8b	"Buster Gets Real"	Dietrich Smith	Elie Klimos & Elise Benoît	September 5, 2007	143B
144a	9a	"D.W. on Ice"	Raye Lankford	Jean Lacombe & Robert Yap	September 6, 2007	141A
144b	9b	"Spoiled Rotten!"	Peter K. Hirsch & Wolfram Breuer	Stéfanie Gignac	September 6, 2007	140A
145	10	"Big Brother Binky"	Stephanie Simpson	Stéfanie Gignac, Elie Klimos & Elise Benoît	September 7, 2007	142A 145A

=== Season 12 (2008–09) ===
No. overall	No. in season	Title	Written by	Storyboard by	Original release date	Prod. code
146a	1a	"Is That Kosher?"	Allan Neuwirth	Robert Yap	October 6, 2008	147A
146b	1b	"Never, Never, Never"	Dietrich Smith	Gerry Capelle	October 6, 2008	146A
147a	2a	"Room to Ride"	Martha Atwater, Ken Olshansky & Peter K. Hirsch	Ivan Tankushev	October 13, 2008	146B
147b	2b	"The Frensky Family Fiasco"	Peter K. Hirsch	Nick Vallinakis	October 13, 2008	147B
148a	3a	"D.W.'s Stray Netkitten"	Matt Steinglass	Gerry Capelle	October 20, 2008	148A
148b	3b	"Bats in the Belfry"	Susan Kim	Elise Benoît, Elie Klimos & Jeremy O'Neill	October 20, 2008	148B
149a	4a	"For the Birds"	Susan Kim	Ivan Tankushev	October 27, 2008	151A
149b	4b	"Ungifted"	Joe Purdy	Gerry Capelle & Michel Carbonneau	October 27, 2008	149B
150a	5a	"The Chronicles of Buster"	Dietrich Smith	Ivan Tankushev & Jeremy O'Neill	November 3, 2008	152B
150b	5b	"On This Spot"	Dietrich Smith	Daniel Decelles	November 3, 2008	152A
151a	6a	"The Cherry Tree"	Leah Ryan	Daniel Miodini, Nick Vallinakis & Sylvie Lafrance	April 20, 2009	155A
151b	6b	"Matchmaker, Match Breaker"	Allan Neuwirth	Zhigang Wang	April 20, 2009	155B
152a	7a	"War of the Worms"	Gentry Menzel	Elise Benoît, Elie Klimos, Zhigang Wang & Sylvie Lafrance	April 21, 2009	151B
152b	7b	"I Owe You One"	Dietrich Smith	Daniel Decelles	April 21, 2009	149A
153a	8a	"The Blackout"	Cusi Cram	Jeremy O'Neill, Daniel Miodini & Nadja Cozic	April 22, 2009	161A
153b	8b	"Mei Lin Takes a Stand"	Peter K. Hirsch	Nick Vallinakis	April 22, 2009	161B
154a	9a	"Home Sweet Home"	Peter K. Hirsch	Gerry Capelle	April 23, 2009	156A
154b	9b	"Do You Believe in Magic?"	Jonathan Greenberg	Daniel Decelles	April 23, 2009	156B
155a	10a	"The Perfect Game"	Elliot Thomson	Jeremy O'Neill & Daniel Miodini	April 24, 2009	162A
155b	10b	"D.W.'s Furry Freak-out"	David Steven Cohen	Elie Klimos & Élise Benoît	April 24, 2009	162B

=== Season 13 (2009–10) ===
No. overall	No. in season	Title	Written by	Storyboard by	Original release date	Prod. code
156	1	"The Great MacGrady"	Peter K. Hirsch & Leah Ryan	Zhigang Wang	October 19, 2009	163B 164B
157a	2a	"The Silent Treatment"	Claudia Silver	Robert Yap	October 13, 2009	153B
157b	2b	"Kung Fool"	Claudia Silver	Robert Yap	October 13, 2009	163A
158a	3a	"Arthur's Number Nightmare"	Peter K. Hirsch	Elie Klimos & Élise Benoît	October 14, 2009	154B
158b	3b	"Brain Gets Hooked"	Matt Steinglass	Aliaksei Kazakou & Michel Carbonneau	October 14, 2009	154A
159a	4a	"MacFrensky"	Jonathan Greenberg	Michel Carbonneau & Stéfanie Gignac	October 15, 2009	159A
159b	4b	"The Good, the Bad, and the Binky"	Claudia Silver	Gerry Capelle	October 15, 2009	159B
160a	5a	"No Acting, Please"	Cusi Cram	Elie Klimos, Nadja Cozic & Élise Benoît	October 12, 2009	158B
160b	5b	"Prunella and the Disappointing Ending" "Prunella Deegan and the Disappointing Ending"	Jonathan Greenberg	Robert Yap	October 12, 2009	157A
161a	6a	"When Carl Met George" "George and the Missing Puzzle Piece"	Peter K. Hirsch	Gerry Capelle & Nick Vallinakis	April 5, 2010	164A
161b	6b	"D.W. Swims with the Fishes"	Cydne Clark & Steve Granat	Robert Yap	April 5, 2010	150A
162a	7a	"A Portrait of the Artist as a Young Tibble"	Peter K. Hirsch	Nick Vallinakis & Daniel Miodini	April 6, 2010	150B
162b	7b	"The Secret Guardians"	Guy Lancaster	Daniel Decelles	April 6, 2010	160A
163a	8a	"Fernlets by Fern"	David Steven Cohen	Zhigang Wang	April 7, 2010	158A
163b	8b	"Prunella and the Haunted Locker"	Gentry Menzel	Nick Vallinakis & Sylvie Lafrance	April 7, 2010	157B
164a	9a	"Paradise Lost"	Jonathan Greenberg	Nick Vallinakis & Daniel Miodini	April 8, 2010	153A
164b	9b	"The Pride of Lakewood"	Peter K. Hirsch	Zhigang Wang, Jeremy O'Neill, Nick Vallinakis & Gerry Capelle	April 8, 2010	165B
165a	10a	"Looking for Bonnie"	David Steven Cohen	Daniel Miodini & Jeremy O'Neill	April 9, 2010	165A
165b	10b	"The Secret Origin of Supernova"	Jonathan Greenberg	Robert Yap	April 9, 2010	160B

=== Season 14 (2010–11) ===
No. overall	No. in season	Title	Written by	Storyboard by	Original release date	Prod. code
166a	1a	"The Wheel Deal"	Raye Lankford	Daniel Miodini	October 11, 2010	177A
166b	1b	"The Buster Report"	Ken Scarborough	Zhigang Wang & Lisa Whittick	October 11, 2010	177B
167a	2a	"The Agent of Change"	Gentry Menzel	Gerry Capelle	October 12, 2010	174A
167b	2b	"D.W. Unties the Knot"	P. Kevin Strader	Greg Hill	October 12, 2010	174B
168a	3a	"Nicked by a Name"	Ken Pontac	Jim Craig & Rob Clarke	October 13, 2010	169A
168b	3b	"The Play's the Thing"	P. Kevin Strader	Chris Damboise, Jean-Marc Paradis & Dev Ramsaran	October 13, 2010	169B
169a	4a	"Falafelosophy"	David Steven Cohen & Peter K. Hirsch	Elise Benoît & François Brisson	October 25, 2010	184A
169b	4b	"The Great Lint Rush"	Peter K. Hirsch	Louis Piché	October 25, 2010	184B
170a	5a	"Tales of Grotesquely Grim Bunny"	David Steven Cohen	Elise Benoît	October 29, 2010	176A
170b	5b	"Pet Projects"	Scott Gray	Rob Clark	October 29, 2010	176B
171a	6a	"Follow the Bouncing Ball"	Peter K. Hirsch	Ivan Tankushev	April 22, 2011	166A
171b	6b	"Buster Baxter and the Letter from the Sea"	Mathayu Warren Lane & Peter K. Hirsch	Ivan Tankushev	April 22, 2011	166B
172a	7a	"Around the World in 11 Minutes"	Jonathan Greenberg	Louis Piché	April 25, 2011	167A
172b	7b	"Muffy and the Big Bad Blog"	Jonathan Greenberg	François Brisson	April 25, 2011	167B
173a	8a	"Arthur Unravels"	Susan Kim	François Brisson	April 26, 2011	171A
173b	8b	"All the Rage"	Claudia Silver	Louis Piché & Al Jeffery	April 26, 2011	171B
174a	9a	"D.W., Queen of the Comeback"	Peter K. Hirsch	Greg Hill	April 27, 2011	178B
174b	9b	"In My Africa"	Ken Pontac	Gerry Capelle	April 27, 2011	178A
175a	10a	"Buster Spaces Out"	Ron Holsey	François Brisson	April 28, 2011	179A
175b	10b	"The Long Road Home"	Peter K. Hirsch	Louis Piché	April 28, 2011	179B

=== Season 15 (2011–12) ===
No. overall	No. in season	Title	Written by	Storyboard by	Original release date	Prod. code
176	1	"Fifteen"	Jonathan Greenberg	Daniel Miodini & Greg Hill	October 10, 2011	181
177a	2a	"I Wanna Hold Your Hand"	Raye Lankford	Daniel Miodini	October 11, 2011	168A
177b	2b	"Whistling in the Wind"	Dietrich Smith	Elise Benoît	October 11, 2011	168B
178a	3a	"Buster's Secret Admirer"	Allan Neuwirth & Peter K. Hirsch	Elise Benoît	October 12, 2011	180A
178b	3b	"The Last King of Lambland"	Tolon Brown	Robert Yap	October 12, 2011	180B
179a	4a	"Cents-less"	Scott Gray	Gerry Capelle	October 13, 2011	182A
179b	4b	"Buster the Lounge Lizard"	Raye Lankford	Rob Clark	October 13, 2011	182B
180a	5a	"To Eat or Not to Eat"	Ken Pontac	Rob Clark, Karine Charlebois & Guy Lamoureux	October 14, 2011	172B
180b	5b	"S.W.E.A.T."	Claudia Silver	Daniel Miodini & Lisa Whittick	October 14, 2011	172A
181a	6a	"Grandpa Dave's Memory Album"	Ken Scarborough	François Brisson	June 15, 2012	183A
181b	6b	"Buster's Carpool Catastrophe"	Elliott Thomson	Tapani Knuutila, Jean Lajeunesse & Rob Clark	June 15, 2012	183B
182a	7a	"Prunella the Packrat"	Guy Lancaster & Peter K. Hirsch	Daniel Miodini & François Brisson	April 16, 2012	185A
182b	7b	"What's in a Name?"	John Marsh	Gerry Capelle & Robert Yap	April 16, 2012	185B
183a	8a	"Muffy's Classy Classics Club"	Susan Kim	Jean Lajeunesse, Patrick Boutin & Gerry Capelle	May 23, 2012	173A
183b	8b	"Best Enemies"	Jonathan Greenberg	Jean-Marc Paradis & Alex Greychuck	May 23, 2012	173B
184a	9a	"Buster's Garden of Grief"	Dietrich Smith	Gerry Capelle	May 24, 2012	170A
184b	9b	"Through the Looking Glasses"	Pennel Bird	Jeremy O'Neill, Jean-Luc Trudel & Patrick Boutin	May 24, 2012	170B
185a	10a	"The Butler Did... What?"	Wolfram Breuer	François Brisson	May 25, 2012	175B
185b	10b	"The Trouble With Trophies"	Cusi Cram	Louis Piché & Guy Lamoureux	May 25, 2012	175A

=== Season 16 (2012–13) ===
No. overall	No. in season	Title	Written by	Storyboard by	Original release date
186	1	"Based on a True Story"	Peter K. Hirsch	Gerry Capelle & Cilbur Rocha	October 15, 2012
187a	2a	"Flippity Francine"	Matt Hoverman	Allan Jeffery	October 16, 2012
187b	2b	"Muffy Takes the Wheel"	Jonathan Greenberg	Gerry Capelle	October 16, 2012
188a	3a	"All About D.W."	Claudia Silver	Ken Cunningham	October 17, 2012
188b	3b	"Blockheads"	Jonathan Greenberg	Robert Yap	October 17, 2012
189a	4a	"Get Smart"	Claudia Silver	Cilbur Rocha	October 18, 2012
189b	4b	"Baby Steps"	P. Kevin Strader	Gerry Capelle	October 18, 2012
190a	5a	"Night of the Tibble"	Dietrich Smith	Allan Jeffery	October 19, 2012
190b	5b	"Read and Flumberghast"	Peter K. Hirsch	Robert Yap	October 19, 2012
191a	6a	"The Last Tough Customer"	P. Kevin Strader & Peter K. Hirsch	Cilbur Rocha	May 6, 2013
191b	6b	"Brain's Chess Mess"	Peter K. Hirsch	Allan Jeffery	May 6, 2013
192a	7a	"Baseball Blues"	David Steven Cohen	Ken Cunningham	May 7, 2013
192b	7b	"Brain's Biggest Blunder"	Matt Hoverman	Robert Yap	May 7, 2013
193a	8a	"Buster's Book Battle"	Jonathan Greenberg	Gerry Capelle	May 8, 2013
193b	8b	"On the Buster Scale"	Dietrich Smith	Ken Cunningham	May 8, 2013
194a	9a	"Fern and the Case of the Stolen Story"	Craig Carlisle	Jeremy O'Neill	May 9, 2013
194b	9b	"Sue Ellen Vegges Out"	Jacqui Deegan	Raymond Jafelice	May 9, 2013
195a	10a	"So Funny I Forgot to Laugh"	Peter K. Hirsch	Allan Jeffery	May 10, 2013
195b	10b	"The Best Day Ever"	Andy Yerkes	Gerry Capelle	May 10, 2013

=== Season 17 (2013–14) ===
No. overall	No. in season	Title	Written by	Storyboard by	Original release date
196a	1a	"Show Off"	Peter K. Hirsch	Ken Cunningham	November 11, 2013
196b	1b	"Dog's Best Friend"	Jacqui Deegan & Peter K. Hirsch	Allan Jeffery	November 11, 2013
197a	2a	"Adventures in Budylon"	Craig Carlisle	Cilbur Rocha	November 12, 2013
197b	2b	"Ladonna Compson: Party Animal"	Marin Gazzaniga	Daniel Miodini	November 12, 2013
198a	3a	"Molina's Mulligan"	Matt Hoverman	Cilbur Rocha	November 13, 2013
198b	3b	"Buster Bombs"	Ken Pontac	Ken Cunningham	November 13, 2013
199a	4a	"Opposites Distract"	Matt Hoverman	Gerry Capelle	November 14, 2013
199b	4b	"Just the Ticket"	Dietrich Smith	Ken Cunningham	November 14, 2013
200a	5a	"All Thumbs"	Dietrich Smith	Gerry Capelle	November 15, 2013
200b	5b	"Kidonia"	Tolon Brown & Peter K. Hirsch	Ken Cunningham	November 15, 2013
201a	6a	"Speak Up, Francine!"	Jonathan Greenberg	Allan Jeffery	April 21, 2014
201b	6b	"Waiting for Snow"	Scott Gray	Cilbur Rocha	April 21, 2014
202a	7a	"Pets and Pests"	Peter K. Hirsch	Allan Jeffery	April 22, 2014
202b	7b	"Go Fly a Kite"	Peter K. Hirsch	Cilbur Rocha	April 22, 2014
203a	8a	"The Director's Cut"	Elliott Thomson & Peter K. Hirsch	Robert Yap	May 12, 2014
203b	8b	"Crime and Consequences"	Peter K. Hirsch	Gerry Capelle	May 12, 2014
204a	9a	"Caught in the Crosswires"	Scott Gray	Allan Jeffery	May 13, 2014
204b	9b	"Framed!"	Kathy Waugh	Cilbur Rocha	May 13, 2014
205a	10a	"Binky's Music Madness"	David Steven Cohen	Ken Cunningham	May 14, 2014
205b	10b	"Brain Freeze"	Andy Yerkes & Peter K. Hirsch	Gerry Capelle	May 14, 2014

=== Season 18 (2014–15) ===
No. overall	No. in season	Title	Written by	Storyboard by	Original release date
206a	1a	"The Friend Who Wasn't There"	Craig Carlisle & Peter K. Hirsch	Gerry Capelle	September 29, 2014
206b	1b	"Surprise!"	Ken Scarborough	Allan Jeffery	September 29, 2014
207a	2a	"The Case of the Girl with the Long Face"	Matt Hoverman	Jeremy O'Neill	September 30, 2014
207b	2b	"The Substitute Arthur"	Ken Scarborough	Rick Marshall	September 30, 2014
208a	3a	"The Tattletale Frog"	Ken Scarborough	Rick Marshall	October 1, 2014
208b	3b	"D.W. & Bud's Higher Purpose"	Peter K. Hirsch	Jeremy O'Neill	October 1, 2014
209a	4a	"Best Wishes"	Dietrich Smith & Peter K. Hirsch	Gerry Capelle	October 2, 2014
209b	4b	"The Tardy Tumbler"	Matt Hoverman	Allan Jeffery	October 2, 2014
210a	5a	"Fountain Abbey"	Kathy Waugh	Gerry Capelle	January 26, 2015
210b	5b	"Arthur Calls It"	Craig Carlisle & Peter K. Hirsch	Rick Marshall	January 26, 2015
211a	6a	"Whip. Mix. Blend."	Peter K. Hirsch	Allan Jeffery	September 7, 2015 (Note: This episode was first released on Arthur's Fountain Abbey DVD on January 27, 2015.)
211b	6b	"Staycation"	Kathy Waugh	Gerry Capelle	September 7, 2015
212a	7a	"Two Minutes"	Ken Scarborough	Gerry Capelle	June 1, 2015
212b	7b	"Messy Dress Mess"	Raye Lankford	Mitch Manzer	June 1, 2015
213a	8a	"Arthur Read: Super Saver"	Raye Lankford	Mitch Manzer	September 9, 2015
213b	8b	"Tibbles to the Rescue"	Matt Hoverman	Jeremy O'Neill	September 9, 2015
214a	9a	"The Pageant Pickle"	Ken Scarborough	Jeremy O'Neill	September 10, 2015
214b	9b	"Some Assembly Required"	Craig Carlisle	Rick Marshall	September 10, 2015
215	10	"Shelter from the Storm"	Peter K. Hirsch	Allan Jeffery & Wayne Lee Pack	September 8, 2015

=== Season 19 (2015–16) ===
No. overall	No. in season	Title	Written by	Storyboard by	Original release date
216a	1a	"Brain's Brain"	Peter K. Hirsch	Rich Vanatte	January 18, 2016
216b	1b	"Brain Sees Stars"	Matt Hoverman	Jeremy O'Neill	January 18, 2016
217a	2a	"Sue Ellen Adds It Up"	Cusi Cram & Peter K. Hirsch	Rich Vanatte	January 19, 2016
217b	2b	"Wish You Were Here"	Dietrich Smith	Allan Jeffery	January 19, 2016
218a	3a	"Arthur's Toy Trouble"	Ken Scarborough	Allan Jeffery	January 20, 2016
218b	3b	"Spar for the Course"	David Steven Cohen & Raye Lankford	Jeremy O'Neill	January 20, 2016
219a	4a	"Carried Away"	Matt Hoverman	Allan Jeffery	May 26, 2016
219b	4b	"Dueling Detectives!"	Ken Scarborough	Jeremy O'Neill	May 26, 2016
220a	5a	"Buster Isn't Buying It"	Peter K. Hirsch	Jeremy O'Neill	June 2, 2015
220b	5b	"One Ornery Critter"	Dietrich Smith	Rick Marshall	June 2, 2015
221a	6a	"Maria Speaks"	Vanessa Wiegel	Jeremy O'Neill	May 24, 2016
221b	6b	"Postcards from Binky"	Ken Scarborough	Rick Marshall	May 24, 2016
222a	7a	"Carl's Concerto"	Eric Shaw & Peter K. Hirsch	Gerry Capelle	April 5, 2016
222b	7b	"Too Much of a Good Thing"	Peter K. Hirsch	Rick Marshall	April 5, 2016
223a	8a	"Francine's Cleats of Strength"	Matt Hoverman	Gerry Capelle	June 3, 2015
223b	8b	"Little Miss Meanie"	Raye Lankford	Rick Marshall	June 3, 2015
224a	9a	"Mr. Ratburn's Secret Identity"	Matt Hoverman	Allan Jeffery	May 25, 2016
224b	9b	"Besties"	Peter K. Hirsch	Gerry Capelle	May 25, 2016
225	10	"The Last Day"	Peter K. Hirsch	Jeremy O'Neill & Rick Marshall	May 23, 2016

=== Season 20 (2016–17) ===
No. overall	No. in season	Title	Written by	Storyboard by	Original release date
226a	1a	"Buster's Second Chance"	Ken Scarborough	Cilbur Rocha	October 10, 2016
226b	1b	"Arthur and the Whole Truth"	Peter K. Hirsch	Jeremy O'Neill	October 10, 2016
227a	2a	"Fern's Flights of Fancy"	Peter K. Hirsch	Gerry Capelle	October 11, 2016
227b	2b	"Cereal"	John Yearly	Cilbur Rocha	October 11, 2016
228a	3a	"He Said, He Said"	Cheri Magid	Sylvain Lavoie	October 12, 2016
228b	3b	"Bunny Trouble"	Kathy Waugh	Jeremy O'Neill	October 12, 2016
229a	4a	"Bud's Knotty Problem"	Raye Lankford	Cilbur Rocha	October 13, 2016
229b	4b	"That's MY Grandma!"	Cliff Ruby & Elana Lesser	Gerry Capelle	October 13, 2016
230a	5a	"Lend Me Your Ear"	Raye Lankford & Peter K. Hirsch	Allan Jeffery	May 30, 2017
230b	5b	"The Butler Did It"	Peter K. Hirsch	Gerry Capelle	May 30, 2017
231a	6a	"Prunella's Tent of Portent"	Jessica Carleton	Jeremy O'Neill	May 31, 2017
231b	6b	"Mutiny on the Pitch"	Cliff Ruby & Elana Lesser	Cilbur Rocha	May 31, 2017
232a	7a	"The Hallway Minotaur"	Matt Hoverman	Gerry Capelle	June 1, 2017
232b	7b	"Ladonna's Like List"	Jessica Carleton	Allan Jeffrey	June 1, 2017

=== Season 21 (2017–18) ===
No. overall	No. in season	Title	Written by	Storyboard by	Original release date
233a	1a	"Binky's 'A' Game"	Peter K. Hirsch	Michel Carbonneau	October 24, 2017
233b	1b	"Brain and the Time Capsule"	Cliff Ruby & Elana Lesser	Jean Banville	October 24, 2017
234	2	"The Master Builders"	Peter K. Hirsch	Gerry Capelle and Michel Carbonneau	October 24, 2017
235a	3a	"Francine & the Soccer Spy"	Vanessa Wiegel	Bernie Denk and Allan Jeffery	October 26, 2017
235b	3b	"Sue Ellen & the Last Page"	Belinda Arredondo	Dev Ramsaran and Allan Jeffery	October 26, 2017
236a	4a	"Muffy Misses Out"	Matt Hoverman	Allan Jeffery	February 12, 2018
236b	4b	"Arthur Takes a Stand" (Note: From this episode, these titles and other episode info are taken from the opening credits and the closing credits of each episode.)	Peter K. Hirsch	Cilbur Rocha	February 12, 2018
237a	5a	"Slink's Special Talent"	Peter K. Hirsch	Cilbur Rocha	February 13, 2018
237b	5b	"Take a Hike, Molly"	Cheri Magid	Nick Vallinakis	February 13, 2018
238a	6a	"The Lost Dinosaur"	Jessica Carleton	Cilbur Rocha	February 14, 2018
238b	6b	"The Princess Problem"	Matt Hoverman	Jean Banville, James Clayton Bourne, and Daniel Miodini	February 14, 2018
239a	7a	"Invasion of the Soccer Fans"	Lindsay Thompson	Denis Banville, Michel Carbonneau, Elie Klimos, and Nick Vallinakis	February 15, 2018
239b	7b	"Pal and the Big Itch"	Peter K. Hirsch	Gerry Capelle	February 15, 2018

=== Season 22 (2019) ===
No. overall	No. in season	Title	Written by	Storyboard by	Original release date
240a	1a	"Mr. Ratburn and the Special Someone"	Peter K. Hirsch	Allan Jeffrey	May 13, 2019
240b	1b	"The Feud"	Jonathan Greenberg	Hélène Cossette & Nick Vallinakis	May 13, 2019
241a	2a	"When Rivals Came to Roost"	Eliza Bent & Glen Berger	Jeremy O’Neill	May 14, 2019
241b	2b	"The Longest Eleven Minutes"	Sarah Katin & Nakia Trower Shuman	Karine Charlebois	May 14, 2019
242a	3a	"Muffy's House Guests"	McPaul Smith	Jeremy O’Neill	May 15, 2019
242b	3b	"Binky Can't Always Get What He Wants"	Peter Ferland	Julien Dufour	May 15, 2019
243a	4a	"Muffy's Car Campaign"	Matt Hoverman & Peter K. Hirsch	Hélène Cossette & Jeremy O'Neill	May 16, 2019
243b	4b	"Truth or Poll"	Sarah Katin & Nakia Trower Shuman	Daniel Miodini & Andreas Schuster	May 16, 2019

=== Season 23 (2019) ===
No. overall	No. in season	Title	Written by	Storyboard by	Original release date	Prod. code
244a	1a	"Fright Night"	Jonathan Greenberg	Jeremy O'Neill	October 14, 2019	2301A
244b	1b	"Citizen Cheikh"	Cliff Ruby & Elana Lesser	Karine Charlebois	October 14, 2019	2301B
245	2	"When Duty Calls"	Matt Hoverman	Allan Jeffery & Karine Charlebois	October 16, 2019	2302
246a	3a	"The Pea and the Princess"	Jeff Goode	Karine Charlebois	October 15, 2019	2303A
246b	3b	"D.W. and Dr. Whosit"	Adam Rudman	Hélène Cossette	October 15, 2019	2303B

=== Season 24 (2021) ===
No. overall	No. in season	Title	Written by	Storyboard by	Original release date
247a	1a	"George Scraps His Sculpture"	Glen Berger	Karine Charlebois	March 10, 2021
247b	1b	"Arthur's Big Meltdown"	Cliff Ruby & Elana Lesser	Gerry Capelle	March 10, 2021
248	2	"The Great MacGrady"	Peter K. Hirsch & Leah Ryan (uncredited)	Elie Klimos, Jeremy O’Neill, & Zhigang Wang	March 8, 2021
249a	3a	"D.W.'s New Best Friend"	Peter Ferland	Tahir Rana & Dimitri Kostic	March 9, 2021
249b	3b	"Freaky Tuesday"	Peter Ferland	Allan Jeffrey	March 9, 2021

=== Season 25 (2022) ===
No. overall	No. in season	Title	Written by	Storyboard by	Original release date
250a	1a	"Binky Wrestles with a Story"	Jennifer Gibbs	Tahir Rana & Hélène Cossette	February 21, 2022
250b	1b	"All Will Be Revealed"	Greg Bailey	Jeremy O’Neill	February 21, 2022
251a	2a	"Making Conversation"	Peter Ferland	Daniel Miodini & Hélène Cossette	February 21, 2022
251b	2b	"A Cloudy Day"	Jonathan Greenberg	Tahir Rana & Tom Nesbitt	February 21, 2022
252a	3a	"Listen Up"	Peter K. Hirsch	Tom Cho & Hélène Cossette	February 21, 2022
252b	3b	"Arthur's New Old Vacation"	Peter Ferland	Allan Jeffrey	February 21, 2022
253a	4a	"Blabbermouth"	Dietrich Smith	Jeremy O’Neill & Hélène Cossette	February 21, 2022
253b	4b	"All Grown Up"	Peter K. Hirsch	Gerry Capelle & Tapani Knuutila	February 21, 2022

== Films ==
Title	Written by	Storyboard by	Original release date
"Arthur's New Friend"	Peter K. Hirsch	Robert Yap & Stefanie Gignac	2000
This episode was released on VHS and DVD as a mail order in partnership with Kideo. The episode is personalized to include a picture of a child that was sent with the mail order. Also, the episode says the child's name several times in the episode. The episode's plot involves Arthur and his friends planning a party for said child.
"Arthur's Perfect Christmas"	Peter K. Hirsch	Eric Bergeron, Marie Blanchard, Angus Bungay, Mario Cabrera, Gerry Capelle, Emmanuelle Gignac, Stefanie Gignac, Lyndon Ruddy, Nick Vallinakis & Robert Yap	November 23, 2000 (Note: This special was first released in Arthur's Perfect Christmas VHS/DVD on September 12, 2000.)
An occasional musical film, Arthur wants his family to have a great Christmas but struggles with his attempts. Meanwhile, Buster's mom is worried about making Christmas enjoyable for Buster, Binky is struggling to bake Christmas desserts properly, and Francine cannot come to Muffy's huge Christmas party because celebrating Hanukkah with her family is more important to her, but Muffy continuously refuses to take no for an answer by ignoring Francine, causing an argument that has put their friendship on the rocks. NOTE: Philip Penalosa sang for Arthur in this special because Michael Yarmush, who voiced the character, was going through puberty. Yarmush left his role after Season 5 and would not voice the character again until the series finale 22 years later.
"Arthur, It's Only Rock 'n' Roll"	Kathy Waugh	Gerry Capelle, Helene Cossette, Nadja Cozic, Elie Klimos, Sylvie Lafrance, Jeremy O'Neill, Zhigang Wang, Harry Rasmussen & Ivan Tankushev	September 1, 2002
After Muffy and Francine watch the Backstreet Boys music video of "I Want It That Way", Francine hosts auditions for a rock band called U Stink. She rejects Arthur, Buster, and George, who later start their own band called We Stink. Muffy eventually joins U Stink as manager. Guest stars: The Backstreet Boys as themselves. This was released on DVD and VHS on October 1, 2002. These releases went out-of-print as Cookie Jar Group opted not to renew this special after CINAR's folding in 2004 due to copyright restrictions. It is also unavailable to purchase digitally on Amazon Prime Video.
"Arthur's Missing Pal"	Ken Scarborough	Robert Sledge, Carolyn Gair, Boyd Kirkland, Lenord Robinson, Robert Griffiths, Larry Leker, Robert Griggs, Bill Thyen, Rich Aarons, Gilbert Weems Jr., Cullen Blaine, Stan Somers, Edward Olson, Sue Perrotto, Elena Kravets, Floro Dery, Dan Haskett	August 18, 2006
Pal goes missing after Arthur forgets to feed him. As a result, Arthur and his friends go on a quest to find him. This film was produced by RichCrest Animation Studios, Mainframe Entertainment, and Marc Brown Studios. This was released on DVD on August 22, 2006.
"D.W. and the Beastly Birthday"	Peter K. Hirsch	Gerry Capelle, Bernie Denk, Olivier Migneron, Dev Ramsaran & Cilbur Rocha	May 29, 2017
After a disappointing 5th birthday party, D.W. is transported to the magical island of Ukubonga, where she is crowned queen. Meanwhile, Arthur has skipped her birthday party to go on a school trip to the planetarium, and dreams about being four years in the future. D.W. gets bored on Ukubonga and realizes that she needs Arthur to keep her life interesting, while Arthur realizes how cool D.W. will be in the future and tries being nicer to her. D.W.'s dream is inspired by the children's book Where the Wild Things Are by Maurice Sendak. This was released on DVD on August 14, 2018.
"Arthur and the Haunted Tree House"	Peter K. Hirsch	Al Jeffery, Cilbur Rocha, Dev Ramsaran, Daniel Miodini & Michel Carbonneau	October 23, 2017
Arthur, Buster, and Ladonna suspect that an old doll is haunting their tree house. Meanwhile, Francine meets an elderly woman who claims to have encountered a golem, Binky finds himself in Mr. Ratburn's haunted house, and Muffy and her butler Bailey get stuck in the cemetery.
"The Rhythm and Roots of Arthur"	Peter Ferland & Peter K. Hirsch	Greg Bailey, Gerry Capelle, Hélène Cossette, Allan Jeffery, Glen Kennedy, Tapani Knuutila, Daniel Miodini, Jeremy O’Neill & Tony Tupilano	January 20, 2020
For Arthur's great-grand uncle Theo's 85th birthday, the Reads and Buster go to his farm in Ohio to celebrate. Arthur learns that his cousin does not have as much in common with him as he expected, D.W. has continual run-ins with a lizard and hangs out with uncle Theo, and Buster feels like he does not belong at the family reunion.
"An Arthur Thanksgiving"	Peter Ferland	Gerry Capelle, Hélène Cossette, Allan Jeffrey, Glen Kennedy, Tapani Knuutila, Daniel Miodini, Tom Nesbitt, Jeremy O’Neill, Tahir Rana & Tony Tupilano	November 16, 2020
On Thanksgiving, Arthur and his class prepare their float for the Thanksgiving parade. Pal runs away from home to bring a nice meal to dogs at a shelter, while D.W. and Bud disapprove of their bossy Aunt Minnie's visit.
"Arthur's First Day"	Peter K. Hirsch	Gerry Capelle, Hélène Cossette, Allan Jeffrey, Glen Kennedy, Tapani Knuutila, Tom Nesbitt, Jeremy O’Neill, Tahir Rana & Tony Tupilano	September 6, 2021
It's finally the first day of fourth grade and Arthur couldn't be more excited - until he learns Buster is in another class. Meanwhile, D.W. is nervous for her first day of kindergarten. Nevertheless, Arthur and D.W. take their opportunity to make new friends.
