= Arthur season 5 =

Arthur
- Season 5
- No. of episodes: 10 (20 segments)

Release
- Original network: PBS
- Original release: September 25 – November 27, 2000

Season chronology
- ← Previous; Season 4 Next → Season 6

The fifth season of the television series Arthur was originally broadcast on PBS in the United States from September 25 to November 27, 2000, and contains 10 episodes. The special "Arthur's Perfect Christmas" served as the finale to this season. Steven Crowder replaced Luke Reid as the Brain. This is the last season in which Michael Yarmush voices Arthur due to his voice changing. Starting in season 9, he returns to voice the character Slink, one of the Tough Customers. Yarmush additionally would return to play Arthur one more time in the final episode of the series, "All Grown Up," by voicing the character's adult self. This is also the last season where Ricky Mabe voices Timmy Tibble due to his voice changing as well. Alex Trebek guest-starred as Alex Lebek on the season premiere "Arthur and the Big Riddle".

Peter Moss replaced Carol Greenwood and Micheline Charest as executive producer and Lesley Taylor stepped in for Cassandra Schafhausen when she replaced Ronald A. Weinberg as producer. Head writers Ken Scarborough and Joe Fallon also left to work on Between the Lions, although Joe Fallon was still credited as executive story editor in this season, along with Joseph Purdy. When this season was nominated for a Daytime Emmy, only Joseph Purdy, Peter K. Hirsch, Kathy Waugh, Dietrich Smith, and Bruce Akiyama were nominated as writers of Arthur.

This season won a Daytime Emmy for Outstanding Children's Animated Program. It was also nominated for Outstanding Achievement in Sound Mixing - Special Class. In 2001, it won a Peabody Award.

Funding for the fifth season of Arthur was provided by corporate sponsoring from LEGO, Juicy Juice, and Post Alpha-Bits, and by a Ready-to-Learn grant from the U.S. Department of Education through the Corporation for Public Broadcasting, and PBS viewers.

== Episodes ==
No. overall	No. in season	Title	Written by	Storyboard by	Original release date	Prod. code
76a	1a	"Arthur and the Big Riddle"	Peter K. Hirsch	Robert Yap	September 25, 2000	78A
Arthur goes on the TV game show Riddle Quest against an intelligent contestant. In the final round, Arthur must decide between winning and staying with his friends. Guest star: Alex Trebek as Alex Lebek.
76b	1b	"Double Dare"	Kathy Waugh	Guylaine Seguin, Lyndon Ruddy & Greg Huculak	September 25, 2000	77B
Arthur, Buster, Francine, and the Brain resent the large amount of homework they are assigned. When Arthur sarcastically mentions he would skip school and his homework, Francine starts a large number of dares issued to skip school. However, the next morning, Arthur and Buster call Francine and Brain out of guilt and attempt to convince them to call off the dare, but Francine fails to receive the message and carries on. As a result, Arthur and Buster try to help her get into the school, but they get caught by an enraged Mr. Haney and Mr. Ratburn. Arthur and Buster are given extra homework for telling the truth while Francine is sentenced to after-school detention for a week.
77a	2a	"Kids Are From Earth, Parents Are From Pluto"	Peter K. Hirsch	Mario Cabrera, Patricia Atchison & Marie Blanchard	October 2, 2000	76A
Lakewood Elementary School is having an open house, and Sue Ellen is initially excited to introduce her parents, Mr. and Mrs. Armstrong, until she hears her friends tell stories about their parents being embarrassing, causing Sue Ellen to change her parents into more "normal people". However, when she realizes she's not letting her parents be themselves, she lets them go, and they become the life of the open house.
77b	2b	"Nerves of Steal"	Bruce Akiyama	Eric Bergeron, Greg Huculak & Patricia Atchison	October 2, 2000	78B
Buster wants a Cybertoy, but they're too expensive. While he's at the store, he steals one and puts it in Arthur's backpack without him noticing. Later that day, he feels guilty for what he did, so he and Arthur try to return it back to the store with an apology note without getting in trouble. However, they accidentally leave the toy on and the manager calls Bitzi, who punishes him for a month and Mr. and Mrs. Read tell him that he should have come to them after he find out what Buster did than help him cover up his mistake.
78a	3a	"It's a No-Brainer"	Dietrich Smith	Robert Yap	October 9, 2000	76B
After losing a math contest to Buster when he cannot get over a question that he got wrong, the Brain decides to start being funny instead of smart. Note: This episode was removed from its rerun in 2021 along with its sister episode due to Brain jokingly drawing a noose.
78b	3b	"The Shore Thing"	Bruce Akiyama	Zoran Vanjaka	October 9, 2000	77A
Although they want to go to Aqualand, an exciting water park, Arthur, Buster, Binky, D.W., Sue Ellen, and the Brain are instead brought to the beach, where Mr. Read tells them about the "Ocean Zone" and leaves them to find it. They have fun at the beach and realize that the beach is the Ocean Zone.
79a	4a	"The World Record"	Gerard Lewis	Lyndon Ruddy & Helene Cossette	October 16, 2000	81B
Arthur and his friends, after reading a world record book, try to set their own records. When they fail individually, they work together to make the world's largest pizza instead.
79b	4b	"The Cave"	Joseph Purdy	Nick Vallinakis & Zoran Vanjaka	October 16, 2000	81A
The class is taking a field trip to a cave. Arthur’s going to teach Francine from teasing him that he is going to be afraid, even though he is sure he will not. When the class goes to the cave, Francine pays the price for her teasing when it is she and Mr. Ratburn who panic when they encounter bats, and it's up to Arthur, using tactics learned from Mr. Read to counter fear, to get the class safely out.
80a	5a	"The Lousy Week"	Peter K. Hirsch	Stefanie Gignac & Patricia Atchison	October 23, 2000	80A
When Muffy gets head lice, it ends up spreading to everyone at school, forcing the students and staff to be checked everyday and decline homework.
80b	5b	"You Are Arthur"	Peter K. Hirsch	Robert Yap	October 23, 2000	82A
Arthur is set to compete against the Brain in a 3K race, with D.W. and the Tibbles helping him train. In the end, Arthur loses the race to the Brain, but has his picture on the front page of the daily newspaper for helping a reluctant Muffy up after she falls down. Note: This episode is shown from Arthur's POV.
81a	6a	"The Election"	Joseph Purdy	Robert Yap	October 30, 2000	80B
Mr. Ratburn's class holds a mock class election. Muffy takes the candidacy for class president seriously and a competitive campaign against Arthur ensues, reaching a fever pitch until a dark horse candidate, whom is Binky, joins the election and wins.
81b	6b	"Francine Goes to War"	Kathy Waugh	Lyndon Ruddy & Patricia Atchison	October 30, 2000	79B
Annoyed by her new neighbor, Mrs. Pariso, Francine tries to get her to move by making a prank call to her, giving her a fake eviction notice, and scaring her with fake spiders, but nothing works. Eventually, Mrs. Pariso invites Francine over for tea and reveals that she was mean at first because she was lonely. The two soon learn they have a lot in common and become good friends.
82a	7a	"Sleep No More"	Dietrich Smith	Stefanie Gignac	November 6, 2000	82B
Buster believes it is his destiny to win a pizza-eating contest. However, he is too excited about the contest to sleep, until he encounters other contestants who share his excitement and anxiety. In the morning, the contest is postponed until everyone can get a good sleep.
82b	7b	"Pet Peeved"	Bruce Akiyama	Lyndon Ruddy, Guylaine Seguin & Eric St. Gelais	November 6, 2000	83B
Francine hires Binky to look after Nemo for the weekend, but he does not read at her written instructions. When Nemo acts strangely at the mention of Francine, Binky keeps him away from her, thinking she is a bad owner.
83a	8a	"The Last of Mary Moo Cow"	Dietrich Smith	Zoran Vanjaka	November 13, 2000	79A
When D.W.'s favorite preschool show, Mary Moo Cow is cancelled, she starts a petition to get the show back on the air, but nothing works and Arthur, who dislikes Mary Moo Cow, is lucky.
83b	8b	"Bitzi's Beau"	Peter K. Hirsch	John Delaney, Nick Vallinakis & Elie Klimos	November 13, 2000	83A
Bitzi has a boyfriend named Harry Mills, and Buster is nervous to meet him, believing he may be an alien. When Buster meets Harry, they find out they have a lot in common.
84a	9a	"Just Desserts"	Written by : Peter K. Hirsch; Idea by : Bruce Akiyama	Stefanie Gignac	November 20, 2000	84B
After eating too much candy and desserts, Arthur ends up with a stomachache and has dreams involving famous fairy tales by the Brothers Grimm.
84b	9b	"The Big Dig" "Grandpa Dave's Great Big Lie"	Kathy Waugh	Elie Klimos, Angus Bungay, Guylaine Seguin, Eric St. Gelais, & Zhigang Wang	November 20, 2000	85A
Arthur and D.W. do not want to spend time with Grandpa Dave because all he does is play checkers and sleep. He tells them about a buried family treasure from their pirate ancestor, so Arthur and D.W. take the map and look for the treasure themselves. However, Grandpa Dave reveals the treasure was just made up as a story to entertain the kids. Note: In other countries, this episode is titled "Grandpa Dave's Great Big Lie".
85a	10a	"Arthur's Family Feud"	Peter K. Hirsch	Stéfanie Gignac & Robert Yap	November 27, 2000	85B
When Mr. Read's soufflé is found destroyed, Arthur and D.W. are banned from TV for four months. Luckily, both explain their sides of the story: Arthur claims that D.W ran too fast into the kitchen and bumped into the table, while D.W claims that Arthur pushed her into the table. Mrs. Read figures out that the truth was a combination of the two stories, and they make amends by helping their father make a new soufflé.
85b	10b	"Muffy Gets Mature"	Michelle Lamoreaux	Robert Yap	November 27, 2000	84A
Muffy hangs out with Catherine because Francine is not mature enough for Muffy's favorite new magazine, meant for teenagers. Catherine's friends ridicule Muffy because of her misguided attempts at acting like a teen, and Catherine convinces Muffy that it's okay to still be a younger kid and to enjoy what she can do while she still can.
