= Arthur (TV series) =

Animated children's television series

- Genre: Edutainment; Slice of life
- Based on: Characters by Marc Brown
- Developed by: Kathy Waugh; Marc Brown
- Directed by: Greg Bailey
- Voices of: (see below)
- Theme music composer: Judy Henderson; Jerry de Villiers Jr.
- Opening theme: "Believe in Yourself" by Ziggy Marley and the Melody Makers
- Ending theme: "Believe in Yourself" (instrumental)
- Composer: Ray Fabi
- Countries of origin: United States; Canada
- Original language: English
- No. of seasons: 25
- No. of episodes: 253 (493 segments) (list of episodes)

Production
- Executive producers: Marc Brown (seasons 10–25); Micheline Charest (seasons 1–4); Carol Greenwald (seasons 1–8; 12–25); Peter Moss (seasons 5–6); Andrew Porporino (season 7); Lesley Taylor (seasons 8–11); Toper Taylor (seasons 9–15); Pierre Valette (seasons 9-13); Michael Hirsh (seasons 12–15); Pamela Slavin (seasons 12–15); Jacqui Deegan (seasons 14–15); Vince Commisso (seasons 16–19)
- Producers: Ronald Weinberg (seasons 1–4); Cassandra Schafhausen (seasons 1–6); Lesley Taylor (seasons 5–7); Pierre Valette (season 7); Greg Bailey (seasons 7–25); Jacqui Deegan (seasons 9–10); Diane Dallaire (seasons 9–11; 20–25); Tolon Brown (seasons 10-13); Susie Grondin (seasons 12–13; 22–25); Natalie Dumoulin (seasons 14–15); Christine Davis (seasons 16–18); Paula Potts (seasons 18–19); Jacques Bilodeau (seasons 20–25)
- Running time: 26 minutes
- Production companies: Marc Brown Studios (seasons 5–25; credited in seasons 7–8); Cookie Jar Group (Note: Known as the CINAR Corporation for the first eight seasons) (seasons 1–15); 9 Story Media Group (seasons 16–19); Oasis Animation (seasons 20–25); WGBH Kids

Original release
- Network: PBS Kids (Note: Known as PTV for the first three seasons. Aired as part of the PBS Kids Go! block from 2004 to 2013.) (United States); CBC Kids (Canada)
- Release: October 7, 1996 – February 21, 2022

Related
- Postcards from Buster

Arthur is an animated children's television series developed by Marc Brown and Kathy Waugh and produced by WGBH Boston for PBS. Based on Brown's Arthur book series, the series is set in the fictional city of Elwood City and follows the everyday lives of Arthur Read, an anthropomorphic aardvark, his family, his friends, and their interactions with one another.

Production was first announced in 1995 by WGBH and Montreal-based animation studio CINAR, and the series premiered on October 7, 1996, on PTV, later renamed PBS Kids. During its 25-season run, Arthur aired 253 half-hour episodes. In June 2018, the series was renewed for four additional seasons, extending its run through season 25. On July 27, 2021, it was announced that the 25th season would be the series' last. The series concluded on February 21, 2022.

Arthur received critical acclaim for its portrayal of issues affecting children and families, including asthma, dyslexia, cancer, diabetes, and autism. It also promotes reading and emphasizes the importance of family and friendship through its diverse cast of characters with varying personalities, beliefs, and interests. It was the longest-running children's animated series in the United States until it was surpassed by SpongeBob SquarePants in 2024, and is the fifth-longest-running American animated television series, behind The Simpsons, South Park, Family Guy, and SpongeBob SquarePants.

== Setting ==
Arthur Read, the series' titular character, is an anthropomorphic brown aardvark who lives in the fictional Elwood City, which is located in North America. He is a third-grade student at Lakewood Elementary School. Arthur's family includes two home-working parents, his father David (a chef) and his mother Jane (an accountant), his two younger sisters, Dora Winifred (D.W.), who is in preschool, and Kate, who is still an infant, and his dog, Pal. Arthur also has several friends who come from diverse ethnic and socioeconomic backgrounds, and he also occasionally meets with members of his extended family.

Elwood City is portrayed as a largely suburban area which bears a strong resemblance to the Boston area; the TV series is partially produced by WGBH. There are also firm references to Brown's hometown of Erie, Pennsylvania. Most notably, the local shopping mall in the TV show is called "Mill Creek Mall", a reference to Millcreek Mall. Brown himself stated that the series is influenced by his upbringing as a child in Erie, and specifically noted that Mr. Ratburn is based on a middle-school algebra teacher he had at Westlake Middle School.

== Production ==
=== Development ===
In January 1993, Marc Brown was approached by WGBH, a PBS affiliate, about the possibility of adapting his Arthur books into a television series. Brown was reluctant at first for he didn't want to give up creative control of his characters. However, future executive producer of Arthur, Carol Greenwald from WGBH, assured Brown that their agenda was to encourage children to read and visit the library. Brown agreed; he himself signed on as an executive producer, and was involved creatively. Initially, screenplays were based on Brown's Arthur book catalog of around 20 stories. Subsequent to going through those, they branched off to write episodes they felt children would find interesting and relate to.

WGBH and CINAR officially announced the series on March 13, 1995, and that both companies would share production on the series, which was aimed for a 1996 release. Random House, the publisher of the Arthur book series, was announced as the home video distributor for the series in North America while CINAR would distribute the series on both television and home video internationally.

A majority of the show is produced in Canada, including animation and voice acting which were both done within Montreal, where CINAR's studios were located. Production and voice acting would relocate to Toronto in 2004 after CINAR went under new management and rebranded as Cookie Jar Entertainment. Animation outsourcing was done within South Korea and Hong Kong, with AKOM Production Company handling the first eleven seasons and Animation Services (HK) Ltd for seasons 12 to 15. The series upgraded to 16:9 1080i HD for its fourteenth season, although the series remained in a 4:3 SD ratio on PBS until October 2012. On September 20, 2011, WGBH announced that 9 Story Entertainment would take over the co-producing role for the series beginning with Season 16 in Fall 2012 and distribute the newer seasons internationally. The major change to the series saw the animation production being moved in-house using Adobe Flash. On September 29, 2015, WGBH announced that animation production would move to the Montreal-based Oasis Animation for Season 20 in 2016.

The only segments of the show that were filmed outside Canada were the "A Word from Us Kids" interstitials, filmed at elementary schools or other educational sites in the Boston area. Beginning in season 11, the "A Word From Us Kids" segment was replaced by a segment called "Postcards from You", where live-action videos sent in by young viewers were spotlighted per episode, and then replaced with "A Word from Us Kids" in season 12. The segments are omitted from all airings outside the US.

Marc Brown's children, Tolon, Eliza, and Tucker, are referenced in the show several times, just as they are in the Arthur book series. For example, the town's moving company is called "Tolon Moving", and everyday items such as cups or pencil sharpeners have the word "Eliza" printed on them. References to Cookie Jar Entertainment and WGBH also appear often on the show. In one episode, Francine and Buster are shown playing a table hockey game in which one team's players wear shirts in the Montreal Canadiens' signature colors with Montreal-based CINAR's logo on them (CINAR was the predecessor to Cookie Jar Entertainment) and the other team's players wear shirts in the Boston Bruins' colors with Boston-based WGBH's sting logo on them. Subsequent episodes that involve hockey also depict players wearing these sweater designs. Also, in the episode "The Big Blow-Up" in season 2, a racecar driver wears a jersey with "CINAR" written on it and a car with "WGBH" written on it. In the episode "Prove It" in season 4, Brain introduces D.W. to science while watching a live-action episode of Nova, a science series also produced by WGBH. Brown's son Tolon, for whom Brown first invented the character of Arthur the Aardvark in a bedtime story, was the executive director of the show.

In October 1999, CINAR was investigated for tax fraud. It was revealed that both the chairman Micheline Charest and president Ronald Weinberg invested $122 million (US) into Bahamian bank accounts without the board members' approval. CINAR had also paid American screenwriters for work while continuing to accept Canadian federal grants for content. However, Arthur itself was not involved in the scandal as it was publicly known to be co-produced with an American company. Head writers Joe Fallon and Ken Scarborough left around that time, but not because of the scandal; Fallon left about a year before the investigation began. Following the departures of Charest and Weinberg, former CBC and YTV executive Peter Moss took over CINAR, assuming Charest's former position on the show as an executive producer alongside WGBH's Carol Greenwald. By season 7, Moss had left CINAR to join Nelvana as a development executive, and financial director Andrew Porporino took his place as executive producer. He was replaced by longtime producer Lesley Taylor in season 8.

Production of the final season was completed by the end of 2019. The series finale, "All Grown Up" featured Arthur's original voice actor, Michael Yarmush, voicing his adult self.

=== Music ===
The TV show's reggae-style theme song, "Believe in Yourself", was written by Judy Henderson and Jerry de Villiers Jr. and was performed by Ziggy Marley and the Melody Makers. A remixed techno version of the song has been officially released on the third album and a shortened version has been played during the closing credits for the sixth season. The Backstreet Boys covered the song with the original instrumentals for the ending credits of television special Arthur: It's Only Rock 'n' Roll. The original music score was produced by Ray Fabi.

In season 2, the song "Crazy Bus", written and performed by then-head writer Joe Fallon, was introduced. It served as the alternate anthem of the television series. Cellist Yo-Yo Ma and jazz composer Joshua Redman covered the song on the ending credits of the season 4 finale episode, "My Music Rules". Joe Fallon left Arthur after season 4, after which the song was officially retired from the show. The show mentions this in the TV special Arthur: It's Only Rock 'n' Roll when D.W. says that "Crazy Bus is for babies; I know a million better songs."

=== Guest stars ===
Many celebrity guest stars have appeared on the show, each providing the voice for their anthropomorphic animal counterpart. Lance Armstrong and Joan Rivers are the only guest stars to make more than one appearance on the series.

== Cast and characters ==
=== Characters ===
Characters and designs of Arthur

(Clockwise from upper left): Brain, Binky, Sue Ellen, Francine, Muffy, Buster, Prunella, George, Arthur, Baby Kate. From the episode, "That's a Baby Show!"

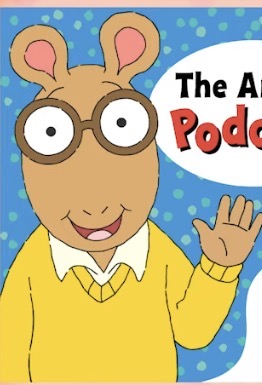
Arthur’s later design from the Flash-animated seasons, shorts, and the cover image for The Arthur Podcast.

The entire series switched to Flash animation by season 16.

Arthur's immediate family is the focus of the series, with most episodes involving Arthur, his younger sister D.W., their parents David and Jane, Baby Kate, and their dog, Pal. Arthur's closest friends include Buster, Francine, Muffy, Binky, Brain, and Sue Ellen, along with others including Fern, Prunella, Jenna, and George as frequent supporting characters.

The adults in Arthur play important roles: Mr. and Mrs. Read display a significant amount of stress from parenting, Arthur's friends' parents are shown struggling in middle-class jobs, and Mr. Ratburn endures the demands and expectations of teaching elementary school. Even in difficult, adult situations, these grown ups maintain a cheerful attitude. In some episodes, Arthur, D.W., and Kate also interact with their paternal grandmother, Thora Read, and maternal grandfather, Grandpa Dave.

=== Voice cast ===
Unlike most animated television series, Arthur showcases a wide range of voice actors. While the majority of the main supporting characters such as Jane, David, Buster, Francine and Binky have been voiced by the same set of actors since the beginning of the series, many of the young characters including Arthur, D.W., Brain, the Tibble Twins, and James have each been voiced by several actors throughout the seasons to avoid noticeable voice changes caused by male puberty.

- Arthur Read
  - Michael Yarmush (Seasons 1–5, "All Grown Up")
  - Justin Bradley (Season 6)
  - Mark Rendall (Seasons 7–8, season 6 redub (U.S. only)
  - Cameron Ansell (Seasons 9–11)
  - Dallas Jokic (Seasons 12–15)
  - Drew Adkins (Seasons 16–17)
  - William Healy (Seasons 18–19)
  - Jacob Ursomarzo (Seasons 20–21)
  - Roman Lutterotti (Season 22–25)
- Dora Winifred "D.W." Read
  - Michael Caloz (Seasons 1–3)
  - Oliver Grainger (Seasons 4–6)
  - Jason Szwimer (Seasons 7–10)
  - Robert Naylor (Seasons 11–15)
  - Jake Beale (Seasons 16–17)
  - Andrew Dayton (Seasons 18–19)
  - Christian Distefano (Seasons 20–21)
  - Ethan Pugiotto (Season 22–25)
  - Nissae Isen ("All Grown Up")
- Buster Baxter
  - Daniel Brochu (as "Danny Brochu" from seasons 1–4)
- Francine Frensky
  - Jodie Resther (as "Jodie Lynn Resther" from season 20–25)
- Mary "Muffy" Crosswire
  - Melissa Altro
- Alan "Brain" Powers
  - Luke Reid (Seasons 1–4)
  - Steven Crowder (Seasons 5–6)
  - Katie Hood (Seasons 7–9)
  - Paul-Stuart Brown (Seasons 9–11)
  - Lyle O'Donohoe (Seasons 12–15)
  - Siam Yu (Seasons 16–19)
  - Max Friedman-Cole (Season 20–21)
  - Evan Blaylock (Season 22–25)
- Shelly "Binky" Barnes/Mr. Read/Bailey
  - Bruce Dinsmore
- Jane Read
  - Sonja Ball
- Nigel Ratburn/Bionic Bunny
  - Arthur Holden
- Grandma Thora
  - Joanna Noyes
- Grandpa Dave/Mr. Crosswire
  - A. J. Henderson
- Prunella Deegan
  - Tamar Koslov
- Sue Ellen Armstrong
  - Patricia Rodriguez (Seasons 1–8)
  - Jessie Kardos (Seasons 9–25)
- Tommy Tibble
  - Jonathan Koensgen (Seasons 1–6)
  - Aaron Grunfeld (Seasons 7–8)
  - Tyler Brody-Stein (Season 9)
  - Ryan Tilson (Seasons 10–11)
  - Jake Roseman (Seasons 12–13)
  - Jake Sim (Seasons 14–17)
  - Devan Cohen (Seasons 18-21)
  - Matthew Mucci (Season 23)
- Timmy Tibble
  - Ricky Mabe (Seasons 1–5)
  - Samuel Holden (Seasons 6–9)
  - Tyler Brody-Stein (Seasons 10–11)
  - Chris Lortie (Seasons 12–13)
  - Dakota Goyo (Seasons 14–15)
  - Jacob Ewaniuk (Seasons 16–18)
  - Samuel Faraci (Seasons 20-21)
  - Ben Hum (Season 23)
- Emily Leduc
  - Vanessa Lengies (Seasons 1–8)
  - Sally Taylor-Isherwood (Season 9–25)
- Nadine
  - Hayley Reynolds
- Fern Walters
  - Holly Gauthier-Frankel
- George Lundgren
  - Mitchell David Rothpan (Seasons 1–7)
  - Evan Smirnow (Season 8)
  - Eleanor Noble (Seasons 9–25)
- Ladonna Compson
  - Krystal Meadows
- Molly MacDonald
  - Maggie Castle
- Jenna Morgan
  - Brigid Tierney
- Catherine Frensky
  - Patricia Rodriguez (Seasons 1–7)
  - Alexina Cowan (Seasons 8–15)
  - Robyn Thaler (Season 16–25)
- James MacDonald
  - Nicholas Wheeler-Hughes (Seasons 1–13)
  - London Angelis (Seasons 14–15)
  - John Flemming (Seasons 16–17)
  - Christian Distefano (Seasons 18–25)
- Bud Compson/Cisely Compson/Kara
  - Julie Lemieux
- Leah MacGrady
  - Bronwen Mantel
- Rubella Deegan
  - Eramelinda Boquer
- Francis Haney/Mr. Marco
  - Walter Massey
- Oliver Frensky
  - Mark Camacho
- Mr. Morris
  - Al Gravelle
- Mrs. Barnes
  - Jane Wheeler
- Bitzi Baxter
  - Ellen David
- Paige Turner
  - Katie Hutchison
- Miss Woods
  - Susan Glover
- Baby Kate
  - Tracy Braunstein
- Pal
  - Simon Peacock
- Nemo
  - Greg Kramer
- Patrick
  - Marcel Jeanin
- Slink/Rafi
  - Michael Yarmush

=== Celebrity guests ===
- Jack Prelutsky – as himself on the episode "I'm a Poet".
- Fred Rogers – as himself in a surprise visit to Elwood City in the episode "Arthur Meets Mister Rogers".
- Art Garfunkel – as "the singing moose" in the episode "The Ballad of Buster Baxter".
- Yo-Yo Ma – as himself as Redman's rival in "My Music Rules".
- Joshua Redman – as himself as Francine's uncle in "My Music Rules"
- Alex Trebek – as "Alex Lebek", a game show host, in "Arthur and the Big Riddle".
- Michelle Kwan – as herself, teaching Francine how to skate in "The Good Sport".
- Backstreet Boys – as themselves in the hour-long special, "Arthur - It's Only Rock 'N' Roll".
- Larry King – interviews the Arthur characters during the interstitial on PBS's telecasts of "Elwood City Turns 100!".
- Tom and Ray Magliozzi – in the episode "Pick a Car, Any Car" as Click and Clack from the "Car Talk" radio show.
- Arthur Ganson – as himself in the episode "Muffy's Art Attack".
- Koko Taylor – as herself in "Big Horns George".
- Taj Mahal – as himself who helps George write music in "Big Horns George".
- Frank Gehry – as an architect who helps the gang build the new treehouse in "Castles in the Sky".
- Rodney Gilfry – as a player in the episode "Lights, Camera... Opera!"
- Johnny Damon – as a player for the Elwood City Grebes.
- Édgar Rentería – as a player in "The Curse of the Grebes".
- Mike Timlin – as a player in "The Curse of the Grebes".
- Ming Tsai – as a judge for a cooking contest at the Lakewood Elementary school in "What's Cooking?".
- Matt Damon – as himself in "The Making of Arthur".
- Lance Armstrong – as himself to help Francine deal with cancer in "The Great MacGrady". Also appears in "Binky vs. Binky" and "Room to Ride". All episodes featuring him were pulled from the air because of Armstrong's doping case, and "The Great MacGrady" was later remade with character Uncle Slam replacing him.
- Joan Rivers – as Francine's grandmother, in both season 12's "Is That Kosher?" and season 15's "Grandpa Dave's Memory Album".
- Philip Seymour Hoffman – as Will Toffman in "No Acting Please".
- Neil Gaiman – as himself in "Falafelosophy". The episode was pulled from air in 2024 due to sexual harassment allegations against Gaiman.
- Michael Fincke – as himself in "Buster Spaces Out;" credited as Mike Fincke.
- Alan Cumming – as Sebastian Winkleplotz in "Show Off".
- Idina Menzel – as Dr. Paula in "Shelter from the Storm".
- B. J. Novak – as Mike "MC" Cramp in "The Last Day".
- John Lewis – as himself in "Arthur Takes a Stand".
- Jane Lynch – as Mr. Ratburn's older sister Patty in "Mr. Ratburn and the Special Someone".
- R. L. Stine – as Bob Baxter in "Fright Night".
- Kevin Sampson – as himself in "George Scraps His Sculpture".
- Marc Brown – as himself in "All Grown Up".

== Episodes ==
| Season | Segments | Episodes | Originally released | | |
| Season | Segments | Episodes | First released | Last released | Network |
|---|---|---|---|---|---|
| 1 | 60 | 30 | October 7, 1996 | November 15, 1996 | PTV |
| 2 | 40 | 20 | October 20, 1997 | April 17, 1998 | PTV |
| 3 | 30 | 15 | November 16, 1998 | January 1, 1999 | PTV |
| 4 | 20 | 10 | October 4, 1999 | October 18, 1999 | PBS Kids |
| 5 | 20 | 10 | September 25, 2000 | November 27, 2000 | PBS Kids |
| 6 | 20 | 10 | September 24, 2001 | November 26, 2001 | PBS Kids |
| 7 | 18 | 10 | October 8, 2002 | November 29, 2002 | PBS Kids |
| 8 | 19 | 10 | September 15, 2003 | December 26, 2003 | PBS Kids |
| 9 | 20 | 10 | December 27, 2004 | April 8, 2005 | PBS Kids Go! |
| 10 | 19 | 10 | May 15, 2006 | May 26, 2006 | PBS Kids Go! |
| 11 | 19 | 10 | June 25, 2007 | September 7, 2007 | PBS Kids Go! |
| 12 | 20 | 10 | October 6, 2008 | April 24, 2009 | PBS Kids Go! |
| 13 | 19 | 10 | October 12, 2009 | April 9, 2010 | PBS Kids Go! |
| 14 | 20 | 10 | October 11, 2010 | April 29, 2011 | PBS Kids Go! |
| 15 | 19 | 10 | October 10, 2011 | June 15, 2012 | PBS Kids Go! |
| 16 | 19 | 10 | October 15, 2012 | May 10, 2013 | PBS Kids |
| 17 | 20 | 10 | November 11, 2013 | May 14, 2014 | PBS Kids |
| 18 | 19 | 10 | September 29, 2014 | September 10, 2015 | PBS Kids |
| 19 | 19 | 10 | June 2, 2015 | May 26, 2016 | PBS Kids |
| 20 | 14 | 7 | October 10, 2016 | June 1, 2017 | PBS Kids |
| 21 | 13 | 7 | October 24, 2017 | February 15, 2018 | PBS Kids |
| 22 | 8 | 4 | May 13, 2019 | May 16, 2019 | PBS Kids |
| 23 | 5 | 3 | September 30, 2019 | October 2, 2019 | PBS Kids |
| 24 | 5 | 3 | March 8, 2021 | March 10, 2021 | PBS Kids |
| 25 | 8 | 4 | February 21, 2022 | | PBS Kids |

Each episode of Arthur ran for half an hour. Episodes consisted of two completely self-contained 11-minute stories. The episodes usually start off with one of the characters (usually Arthur) speaking towards the audience about a situation within the story followed by the title card. The episodes were separated by a one-to-two-minute live-action interstitial called "And Now a Word from Us Kids" (or, in some cases, a variation of that title more specific to its contents). The live action segments almost always featured children from elementary schools (generally in the Boston area) presenting subjects they are currently learning about or projects they have been working on in their classes (the subjects covered here relate to the first cartoon segment in the half-hour). This segment was seen exclusively on PBS telecasts of the show, filling space otherwise used for commercials, which are generally forbidden on PBS. In "Elwood City Turns 100!", Larry King interviews Arthur and his friends. There was also a segment that sometimes appears at the end of the second 11-minute episode called "And Now a Word from Marc Brown" where he shows the viewers how to draw various main characters from the show. In 2007, the show began encouraging viewers to send in "video postcards" (similar to those used in the spin-off show Postcards from Buster), which were shown in the interstitials of episodes until the middle of Season 12. Beginning with episode 151, the show reverted to "And Now a Word from Us Kids".

Set in a realistic environment (as opposed to the more fantastical settings prominently featured in children's programming), certain stories (often in the second half of the episode) may not necessarily focus on the titular protagonist's point of view and may instead detail the experiences and viewpoints of surrounding characters, usually Arthur's classmates. Often such episodes covered those characters handling situations often faced by children in actuality as a means of guiding audiences through those situations, including bedwetting, asthma, or dyslexia, and Arthur's character sometimes may see a reduced role (in some episodes, Arthur himself does not appear in the story at all). Stories in later seasons dealt with more serious issues or subjects, such as cancer, autism spectrum disorder, or even same-sex marriage, although numerous episodes simply addressed topics including childhood fears, trends, or fantasies. Occasionally, some episodes may not offer educational value. In spite of the realistically designed environment, the series showcased the fantasies or daydreams of a few characters on a number of occasions, and a few episodes feature supernatural elements such as ghosts or secret situations unknown to other characters such as Kate and Pal's friendship or imaginary friends.

In May 2019, Alabama Public Television withheld the airing of "Mr. Ratburn and the Special Someone", where Arthur's teacher, Mr. Ratburn, married another man named Patrick. The station had also declined to broadcast a 2005 episode of the spin-off show, Postcards from Buster, where a friend had two mothers.

== Franchise ==
=== Television ===
In addition to the television series, the Arthur franchise has spawned seven hour-long films, some of which used to be often run on PBS during pledge drives. An additional movie, Arthur's Missing Pal, was produced by Mainframe Entertainment and was the first animated Arthur project to make use of 3-D computer-generated imagery. Arthur's success has also led to the spin-off series Postcards from Buster. A pilot for Postcards from Buster aired in December 2003 as a season 8 episode of Arthur. Postcards from Buster premiered on October 11, 2004, and continued until November 21, 2008; the series faced several years of hiatus, until a brief revival in February 2012 with two previously unaired episodes that had been held over from the show's third season.

=== Website ===
The program's official website has been given a rating of 5/5 stars at website Common Sense Media, and has been advised for viewers 5 and up. The site described the show as being "one of the Internet's best offerings for kids". It also advised that "there are links to PBS sponsors but other than that, there is no commercial marketing to kids." The review added, "The games are actually teaching your kids something for example The Music Box combines music and learning, so much so that kids won't even realize that they're figuring out space relations, hand–eye coordination, and mousing skills as they jam along to upbeat tunes."

=== Music albums ===
Arthur has released three music albums. The first album, Arthur and Friends: The First Almost Real Not Live CD, contained songs that were played throughout the TV show and original songs for the album. The second album, Arthur's Perfect Christmas, contained songs that were played during the television film of the same title. The third album, Arthur's Really Rockin' Music Mix, contained only original songs, including a remix of the theme song which was played on the credits of season 6 as a promotion for the album.

=== Podcast ===
On October 20, 2022, GBH Kids and Gen-Z Media launched The Arthur Podcast. Episodes of the podcast feature Arthur and his friends and family as they retell the events of episodes like "Locked in the Library!" and "Mr. Ratburn and the Special Someone". The podcast is supplemented by interactive segments that incorporates viewer-sent questions that relate to kids' everyday lives and challenges (initially, Arthur would listen to viewer-sent messages of how they would tackle a specific problem; the fourth season of the podcast features D.W. answering viewer-sent questions with Buster). As of 2026, four seasons of 25 episodes have been released since its debut.

=== ActiMates ===
In 1998, both Arthur and D.W. were made into Microsoft ActiMates, refined toy dolls who could interact with children, with each other, with certain computer software and the Arthur website, and also with the Arthur television show and videos.

Microsoft discontinued the ActiMates line shortly before season 5 aired, most possibly due to a lawsuit pertaining to patent infringement and the fact that sales were dropping. It has been noted that post-season 4 episodes of Arthur have not included any ActiMates code. Newer videos and DVD releases of the show does not carry ActiMates code either. The enhancements on the website were removed when the site was redesigned in 2002 and thus the ActiMates would not interact with the website. Likewise, re-releases of the ActiMates software by Creative Wonders do not interact with the ActiMates because the library that controls the PC Pack has been replaced with a dummy library file.

=== Home media releases ===
Selected episodes were distributed on VHS and DVD by Random House. Each tape had two or three episodes dealing with similar subjects. WGBH Home Video also released two Region 1 Arthur season sets; they released season 10 on March 25, 2008, and season 11 was released on September 2, 2008. Seasons 10–19 are available to download on the iTunes Store and Amazon.com. The first three seasons were released over four collections (the second season was split into two volumes) on DVD in Europe only. Select episodes of Arthur, including the hour-long The Rhythm and Roots of Arthur, are available on PBS Kids' website, including versions with American Sign Language interpreters for deaf or hard-of-hearing viewers.

| DVD name | Ep # | Region | Release date |
|---|---|---|---|
| Season 1 | 30 | Region 2 | April 7, 2008 |
| Season 2 | 20 | Region 2 | November 3, 2008; March 23, 2009 |
| Season 3 | 15 | Region 2 | August 4, 2009 |
| Season 4 | 10 | TBA | TBA |
| Season 5 | 10 | TBA | TBA |
| Season 6 | 10 | TBA | TBA |
| Season 7 | 10 | Region 1 | November 21, 2006 |
| Season 8 | 10 | TBA | TBA |
| Season 9 | 10 | TBA | TBA |
| Season 10 | 10 | Region 1 | March 25, 2008 |
| Season 11 | 10 | Region 1 | September 2, 2008 |
| Season 12 | 10 | TBA | TBA |
| Season 13 | 10 | TBA | TBA |
| Season 14 | 10 | TBA | TBA |
| Season 15 | 10 | TBA | TBA |
| Season 16 | 10 | TBA | TBA |
| Season 17 | 10 | TBA | TBA |
| Season 18 | 10 | TBA | TBA |
| Season 19 | 10 | TBA | TBA |
| Season 20 | 7 | TBA | TBA |
| Season 21 | 7 | TBA | TBA |
| Season 22 | 4 | Region 1 | July 9, 2019 |
| Season 23 | 3 | TBA | TBA |
| Season 24 | 3 | TBA | TBA |
| Season 25 | 4 | Region 1 | March 1, 2022 |

== Broadcast ==
Arthur became one of the highest-rated shows on PBS Kids for several years since its debut, averaging almost 10 million viewers weekly in the United States. It is aired in a total of 83 countries, including on: PBS in the United States; Knowledge Network, TVOntario, TFO, CBC, and Radio-Canada in Canada; several ABC channels in Australia; and BBC One/CBBC/CBeebies in the UK and PBS Kids in South Africa. It also aired in Ireland on TnaG (now TG4) in an Irish dubbed version.

== Reception ==
=== Awards ===
The series has been acknowledged with the George Foster Peabody Award and four Daytime Emmy Awards. The television writers of The Associated Press voted Arthur as one of the top 10 television shows of the 1990s. In 2002, TV Guide ranked Arthur Read No. 26 on its list of the "50 Greatest Cartoon Characters of All Time". The show has also won a BAFTA and was nominated for 21 Daytime Emmys.

=== Critical response ===
Ostrov, Gentile, and Crick (2006) write that "our viewing of many educational programs such as Arthur suggests that relational aggression is modeled at a fairly high rate. For example, children may be shown excluding and ostracizing friends or peers on the playground as part of the TV show." (p. 622). They go on to theorize that preschoolers, due to their developmental stage, may have a hard time fully understanding conflict resolution, which typically occurs at the very end of a show. Shows like Arthur typically spend most of their time building up conflicts and this may impact the type of learning that is occurring while watching shows. Moreover, they cite research suggesting that the impacts of modeling relational aggression may be especially strong for girls. This research was elaborated on in the New York Times best-selling book on parenting NurtureShock: New Thinking About Children by Bronson and Merryman (2009). Their punch line is: "Essentially, Ostrov had just found that Arthur is more dangerous for children than Power Rangers." (p. 181).

About.com gave the show a rating of 4.5 stars. The series described Arthur's assets:

The Arthur series has won several awards including the George Foster Peabody, and for good reason. Arthur presents issues and situations kids can relate to, and teaches positive behaviors and responses to these issues in a genuine and comical way. The series is fun and engaging to the target age group. Kids will relate to the storylines and characters, and will therefore give thought to the responses the characters demonstrate and outcome of those responses. Because "Arthur" presents real childhood issues, the show contains some imitative behavior such as name calling or bickering, much like children experience in their own lives. Kids might hear words like "sissy" or "stupid" and see Arthur and D.W. argue. Should children mimic some of these phrases or tactics, the show provides a good springboard for parents to talk about the issues with their children and point out the importance of considering others' feelings.

The review continued by citing many ways in which children could extract more from the series, for example by encouraging kids to write stories based on their own families (in much the same way Arthur was first realized) or by Kim Brown, Marc Brown's sister, teaching kids to draw Arthur while on tour.

Jillian Fabiano of E! News wrote that the show's ending "has taught kindness, empathy and inclusion for 25 years."

=== Cultural influence ===
Brain, Francine, and Arthur animated in the style of South Park, from the episode "The Contest".

Arthur regularly incorporates parodies of and references to pop culture including (but not limited to) South Park, Jeopardy!, The Waltons, Dexter's Laboratory, The Sopranos, Beavis and Butt-Head, the Indiana Jones films, the James Bond films, The Adventures of Tintin, Dr. Katz, Professional Therapist, The Jerry Springer Show, Oprah, Law & Order, Charlie Rose, Antiques Roadshow, Mystery!, The Twilight Zone, Alfred Hitchcock's The Birds, Macbeth, Planet of the Apes, The Matrix, Star Wars, Titanic, The Wizard of Oz, Jaws, That '70s Show, Harry Potter, Keeping Up with the Kardashians, This Old House, The Happy Hollisters, Percy Jackson & the Olympians, High School Musical, Pirates of the Caribbean, and The Chronicles of Narnia. The heavy use of cultural parodies and references has contributed in part to the show's dedicated cult following among older audiences.

In July 2014, Chance the Rapper released his interpretation of the theme song of the series called "Wonderful Everyday: Arthur" with Wyclef Jean and Jessie Ware.

In and leading up to July 2016, Arthur regained attention from users of Black Twitter, where stills from the series have become explicit and comedic internet memes, often using an image of Arthur's clenched fist from the episode "Arthur's Big Hit". WGBH said, "We appreciate the memes that have been created and shared in good fun, we are, however, disappointed by the few that are outside of good taste." In a February 2022 interview with Yahoo! Entertainment, Marc Brown expressed his appreciation that the show has become a pop culture meme mainstay, and found it funny when celebrities like LeBron James and John Legend used memes from the show.

== Discography ==
=== Albums ===
- "The First Almost Real Not Live CD (or Tape)" (1998)
- "Arthur's Perfect Christmas" (2000)
- "Arthur's Really Rockin' Music Mix" (2001)

=== Singles ===
- "Boogie Woogie Christmas" (2000)
