= Arthur season 4 =

Arthur
- Season 4
- No. of episodes: 10 (20 segments)

Release
- Original network: PBS
- Original release: October 4 – October 18, 1999

Season chronology
- ← Previous; Season 3 Next → Season 5

The fourth season of the television series Arthur was originally broadcast on PBS in the United States from October 4 to 18, 1999 and contains 10 episodes. It is the last season with Luke Reid voicing Brain. Oliver Grainger has replaced Michael Caloz as D.W. due to Caloz's voice changing after the previous season.

== Production ==
According to an April 7, 1999 CINAR press release, the episode "My Music Rules" was originally going to be the season premiere, but ended up being part of the season finale instead for undisclosed reasons.

== Episodes ==
No. overall	No. in season	Title	Written by	Storyboard by	Original release date	Prod. code
66a	1a	"D.W.'s Library Card"	Peter K. Hirsch	Mario Cabrera	October 4, 1999	67B
D.W. desperately wants a new book at the library, and she has to learn how to write her name to get her own library card. After she does, the book has already been taken out, and she is impatient.
66b	1b	"Arthur's Big Hit"	Joe Fallon	Robert Yap	October 4, 1999	68A
Arthur becomes furious with D.W. after she throws his new model airplane out of his bedroom window, even though he repeatedly told her not to touch it. After he punches her in the arm out of fury and refuses to apologize, he is given a week-long TV timeout, and no one seems to understand his side of the story. Meanwhile, the Tough Customers convince Binky to hit Arthur. When Binky does, Arthur realizes how hurt D.W. must have felt when he hit her. He understands that what he did was wrong and learns an important lesson about empathy and the consequences of hurting others. Note: The scene where Arthur hits D.W. became an internet meme.
67a	2a	"Hide and Snake"	Bruce Akiyama	Stefanie Gignac	October 5, 1999	67A
Arthur and his friends discover a snake hidden in the woods and sneak it into Arthur's room with a shoe box. However, the snake goes on the loose and Arthur realizes that keeping snakes in the house is against the rule. To make matters worse, the kids cannot remember if it is a venomous coral snake or the similarly-colored, but harmless kingsnake. They try to find and get rid of the snake without the other Reads noticing.
67b	2b	"Muffy's New Best Friend"	Dietrich Smith	Stefanie Gignac	October 5, 1999	70B
Muffy and Francine are best friends, but Muffy dislikes soccer and Francine dislikes shopping. After Francine and Jenna discover that both of them like soccer, Muffy searches for a new best friend who likes the same activities as her, but none of them are perfect matches.
68a	3a	"Buster's Breathless"	Written by : Peter K. Hirsch; Idea by : Steve Viksten	Michel Magnan & Alex Hawley	October 7, 1999	69A
D.W. gets poison ivy while playing a game with Arthur and Buster and is worried about being teased by her friends, so Buster tells a story about how he got asthma. When Buster learns that he has asthma, his friends start treating him differently, with Arthur scared that any dust could affect him, while Francine believes it is a contagious disease. Buster explains that he educated his friends by doing a science project about asthma, which helps D.W. feel better.
68b	3b	"The Fright Stuff"	Bruce Akiyama	Jeremy O'Neill	October 7, 1999	66A
Muffy and Francine play several pranks on Arthur, Buster, Binky, and the Brain. Luckily, they all invite the duo to a Halloween costume party at a haunted house. The boys get revenge on the girls at the party, but their pranks get unknowingly interrupted by real ghosts.
69a	4a	"The Contest"	Ken Scarborough	Robert Yap	October 8, 1999	66B
Arthur's friends participate in a contest about writing for a TV series, Andy & Company, and each comes up with their own stories, believing theirs will win. Five years later, the results are in and Arthur's friends are shocked when they find out that a girl from Canadian, Oklahoma named Holly Holland has won. Note: "The Contest" was the result of an actual contest where viewers could send in story ideas for an episode, and Holly Holland, who was mentioned in the episode, was the contest's winner.
69b	4b	"Prove It"	Joe Fallon	Jeremy O'Neill	October 8, 1999	71A
Wanting to prove to Arthur that she is smart, D.W. hangs around with the Brain, watching Nova with him, and starts her own science fair that is full of untrue facts that Arthur cannot disprove, even with the Brain's help. As the last resort, Arthur brings D.W. with him and the Brain to a science museum to show her how things really work, and she then reveals to Arthur that this had been her plan all along.
70a	5a	"The Blizzard"	Joe Fallon	Alex Hawley	October 11, 1999	73A
A blizzard hits Elwood City, and the townspeople face a blackout, forcing them to stay in the Read household, the only house that has power, but the Reads lose it as well. Each family brings their supplies and food, allowing them to survive together. Meanwhile, Francine is assigned a three-page school report on pioneers, but she’s unable to figure out what to write, until she realizes what the townspeople are going through is very similar to the pioneers struggles. Meanwhile, Mr. Ratburn, Mr. Haney, and Mr. Morris are forced to stay at Lakewood Elementary School to drain the pipes so they can prevent the campus from closing for a month.
70b	5b	"The Rat Who Came to Dinner"	Joe Fallon	Maria Astadjova & Jeremy O'Neill	October 11, 1999	69B
After his house roof is damaged by snow, Mr. Ratburn stays at Arthur's house. Arthur is mortified that it'll be non-stop homework and teaching, only to find out Mr. Ratburn is more fun outside of school than he thought. When Arthur's friends tease him, saying that he is become a "teacher's pet", Mr. Ratburn says he plans on staying at Arthur's friend's homes, too, until his roof is repaired.
71a	6a	"D.W. Tale Spins"	Joe Fallon	Stefanie Gignac	October 12, 1999	74B
D.W. wants to prove to Arthur that she can tell a good story, and after getting advice from Grandma Thora, she retells the Odyssey in her own way.
71b	6b	"Prunella Gets It Twice"	Joe Fallon	Michel Magnan & Peter Huggan	October 12, 1999	68B
Prunella gets two dolls for her birthday and declines the second one from Francine. Later, Prunella thinks that Francine has spoiled the party by not joining in on the festivities. That night, Prunella has a dream where the Ghost of Presents Past takes her through time to clear things up and shows how far Francine went to get the doll for Prunella and makes her realize that Francine's attitude was because of how Prunella did not appreciate the present.
72a	7a	"Binky Barnes, Wingman"	Bruce Akiyama	Robert Yap	October 13, 1999	74A
Binky does a project on butterflies and is addictive with catching a rare blue butterfly. After Sue Ellen shows him that butterflies are killed and pinned in worldwide museums, Binky lets his butterflies go to the wild instead.
72b	7b	"To Beat or Not to Beat"	Barney Saltzberg	Jeremy O'Neill	October 13, 1999	71B
When Francine enters a talent show, her friends try to tell her that she sounds horrible when she sings and drums at the same time, even though she's a good drummer. After she hears a recording of herself, she realizes her friends are right, and at the talent show, she surprises them without her drum set as she sings very well.
73a	8a	"1001 Dads"	Peter K. Hirsch	Robert Yap	October 14, 1999	72B
The Father's Day picnic is approaching, and Arthur's friends try to find a substitute father for Buster while his own father is away. During the big event, Buster arrives with Bitzi in a hot air balloon and reveals that his father rented balloon rides for the picnic goers, to the surprise of his friends.
73b	8b	"Prunella's Prediction"	Jennifer Barnes	Stefanie Gignac	October 14, 1999	72A
Prunella wants flash pants and Rubella predicts that she is getting them for her birthday, only to be disappointed by a watch instead. Prunella does not want to be seen without flash pants, since she told Muffy she was going to get them. Meanwhile, Arthur is afraid of being teased when wearing Mr. Read's old jacket because he has outgrown his old winter coat. While Prunella and Arthur try to go shopping for saltine crackers, they realize that they do not have to hide because of what they wear.
74a	9a	"What is that Thing?"	Peter K. Hirsch	Jeremy O'Neill & Emmanuelle Gignac	October 15, 1999	73B
Arthur and his friends separately find the same metal bobbin but do not know its use, even though it helps them in different ways. Muffy retrieves her toy from a sewer, Francine ends Nemo's fear of water, the Brain uses the bobbin as a substitute wheel for his model plane, and even Buster gets the idea to write a story for his favorite TV show. They fight over it and find out that it is Mr. Ratburn's bobbin, and learn what it does at his puppet show.
74b	9b	"Buster's Best Behavior"	Gerard Lewis	Robert Yap, David Thrasher & Guylaine Seguin	October 15, 1999	75A
Buster is hilarious but wants to be good at something else, and Arthur wants to be funny just like him, resulting in them acting like each other. Francine, Muffy, and Brain try to get them back to normal.
75a	10a	"My Music Rules"	Ken Scarborough	Alex Hawley, Robert Yap & Stefanie Gignac	October 18, 1999	75B
The Elwood City Library is looking for a musician to perform for a children's show, and Francine's father suggests that they hire Joshua Redman, who is a distant uncle of Francine's and a musician who can play anything. Meanwhile, Grandma Thora takes D.W to a concert, and she wants Chinese-American mastery cellist Yo-Yo Ma to play, leading to a conflict of preferred music until both musicians show that music styles do not matter. Guest stars: Yo-Yo Ma and Joshua Redman as themselves.
75b	10b	"That's a Baby Show!"	Joe Fallon	Robert Yap	October 18, 1999	70A
Arthur enjoys a show meant for kids younger than him, and his friends make fun of him for being a "baby". Arthur convinces them to watch it too, after which they all admit to liking it.
