= Arthur TV soundtracks =

The Concord label Rounder Records through the Rounder Kids imprint has released 3 soundtracks of the 1996 animated television series Arthur.

== Arthur and Friends: The First Almost Real Not Live CD (or Tape) ==
Arthur and Friends: The First Almost Real Not Live CD (or Tape)

Soundtrack album by Arthur & Friends
- Released: October 20, 1998
- Recorded: 1992 ("Matalii ja Mustii"), 1996–1998
- Genre: Various
- Label: Rounder Kids

Arthur & Friends chronology
Arthur and Friends: The First Almost Real Not Live CD (or Tape) (1998)	Arthur's Perfect Christmas (2000)

Arthur and Friends: The First Almost Real Not Live CD was the first album for the series, issued in October 1998. Many of the songs on this CD aired in shorter forms on the TV episode "Arthur's Almost Live Not Real Music Festival." Others were heard at other times on the program and some were never seen on the TV show. Tracks on this CD included the show's main title theme, "Library Card," multiple tracks of D.W.'s favorite song "Crazy Bus," (by former show writer/executive story editor Joe Fallon), "Leftovers Goulash" (which utilizes a range of classic music and opera compositions, most notably the Hungarian Rhapsody No. 2), "The Ballad of Buster Baxter," (a more complete form than that heard on the television story) and "Jekyll and Hyde."

=== Track list ===
No.	Title	Artist(s)	Length
1.	"Believe in Yourself (A Wonderful Kind Of Day)"	Ziggy Marley and the Melody Makers	1:50
2.	"Library Card"	The cast of Arthur	2:50
3.	"Crazy Bus (No Way!)"	Michael Yarmush; Michael Caloz	0:20
4.	"Arthur vs. the Piano" (with Daniel Brochu)	Michael Yarmush	2:55
5.	"The UFO Song"	Daniel Brochu	2:07
6.	"Meek for a Week"	Jodie Resther	3:16
7.	"Jekyll and Hyde"	Luke Reid	3:24
8.	"My Dog Pal"	Michael Yarmush; Michael Caloz; Daniel Brochu; Luke Reid; Jodie Resther; Susan Glover	4:03
9.	"Matalii ja Mustii (The Binky Song)"	Värttinä	2:45
10.	"Crazy Bus (I Said No, DW!)"	Michael Yarmush; Michael Caloz	0:13
11.	"My Night Light" (with Daniel Brochu)	Bruce Dinsmore	2:54
12.	"Go to Sleep"	Michael Caloz	2:24
13.	"Thinking Tune"	Luke Reid	0:42
14.	"Lucky Pencil"	Michael Yarmush	3:23
15.	"Homework" (featuring Daniel Brochu)	Arthur Holden	2:20
16.	"Poetry Club"	Daniel Brochu; Jodie Resther; Michael Yarmush; Michael Caloz	2:03
17.	"The Ballad of Buster Baxter"	Art Garfunkel	2:14
18.	"Leftovers Goulash"	Bruce Dinsmore; Michael Yarmush; Michael Caloz	2:11
19.	"Crazy Bus (What's This Doing Here?!)"	Joe Fallon	1:47

== Arthur's Perfect Christmas ==
Arthur's Perfect Christmas

Soundtrack album by Arthur & Friends
- Released: September 19, 2000
- Recorded: 2000
- Genres: Christmas, soundtrack
- Label: Rounder Kids

Arthur & Friends chronology
Arthur and Friends: The First Almost Real Not Live CD (1998)	Arthur's Perfect Christmas (2000)	Arthur's Really Rockin' Music Mix (2001)

Arthur's Perfect Christmas features many songs from the television special, including "Boogie Woogie Christmas" and "Baxter Day". The CD also contains songs that were either heard on the television special as instrumentals or not featured at all.

=== Track list ===
1. "Perfect Christmas"
2. "Jingle Bells"
3. "The First Noel"
4. "Boogie Woogie Christmas" (Holliday:14)(Can. 7)
5. "Here We Come A-wassailing"
6. "O Little Town of Bethlehem"
7. "Silent Night"
8. "Fum, Fum, Fum"
9. "It's Kwanzaa Time!"
10. "What Child Is This?"
11. "What's the Use of Presents?"
12. "Baxter Day"
13. "I'm Not Scared of Santa"
14. "We Three Kings"
15. "Chanukah, Oh Chanukah"
16. "Sevivon"
17. "Chanukah Blessing"
18. "Santa Lucia"
19. "Nu Är Det Jul Igen" (Swedish for "Now It's Christmas Again")
20. "Angels We Have Heard on High"
21. "Bring a Torch, Jeanette, Isabella"
22. "It Came Upon a Midnight Clear"
23. "O Tannenbaum"
24. "Joy to the World"
25. "Perfect Christmas Reprise"

== Arthur's Really Rockin' Music Mix ==
Arthur's Really Rockin' Music Mix

Soundtrack album by Arthur & Friends
- Released: September 11, 2001
- Recorded: 2001
- Genre: Soundtrack
- Label: Rounder Kids

Arthur & Friends chronology
Arthur's Perfect Christmas (2000)	Arthur's Really Rockin' Music Mix (2001)

Arthur's Really Rockin' Music Mix was released on September 11, 2001. This CD contains only one song heard in the show, a remixed version of the main title theme. A short version of this remix was played during the closing credits in the sixth season. All other tracks are new. They are intended as a mix of various styles, including tango, jazz, blues and even country. Songs include "Two Sides of the Story" (based on the story "Arthur's Family Feud"), "Fern's Detective Tango" (based loosely on the story "Binky Rules") and "D.W.'s Brass in Pocket" (a cover of the Pretenders song "Brass in Pocket"). There is also a retelling of the story of "Goldilocks and the Three Bears" by Sue Ellen, featuring Binky as Baby Bear, with lines such as "I don't feel like a baby. Can't I be their cousin from down south who's a professional race car driver?"

=== Track list ===
1. "Believe in Yourself" (Arthur Theme Remix)
2. "I Don't Want to Wake Up"
3. "Pop Quiz from Ratburn" (sung to the tune “Pop Goes the Weasel”)
4. "Has Anybody Seen My Invisible Friend?"
5. "Two Sides of the Story"
6. "I Can't Snap My Fingers"
7. "Fly, Butterfly, Fly!"
8. "D.W.'s Brass in Pocket"
9. "Elwood City: A Report"
10. "Muffy's Soccer Song"
11. "My Brain"
12. "Only the Frensky"
13. "Mrs. Wha-cha-ma-call-it"
14. "Fern's Detective Tango"
15. "My Echo Doesn't Sound Like Me"
16. "Goldilocks and The Bears Trio as Told by Sue Ellen"
