= Believe in Yourself (song) =

1996 theme song from Arthur

Song by Ziggy Marley and the Melody Makers

from the album Arthur and Friends: The First Almost Real Not Live CD (or Tape)
- Released: October 7, 1996
- Genre: Reggae
- Length: 1:52
- Label: GBH Records; Cinar; Rounder Kids
- Songwriter: Judith Henderson
- Producer: Ziggy Marley

"Believe in Yourself (A Wonderful Kind of Day)" is the theme song for the PBS series Arthur. It was written and composed by Judith Henderson, with musical arrangement by Jerry de Villiers Jr., and performed by Ziggy Marley and the Melody Makers. The series was produced by Cinar in Montreal and executive produced by Carol Greenwald for WGBH.

For all 25 seasons (1996–2022), episodes of Arthur begin with an approximately minute-long version of the song paired with an animated sequence. The opening lyric appears as Arthur is shown walking outside: "Every day when you're walking down the street, everybody that you meet has an original point of view." NBC News named it among the catchy theme songs of the 1990s and called it "one of the most timeless".

== Background ==
The series Arthur is based on the book series by Marc Brown.

The theme song was written by Judith Henderson, with musical arrangement by Jerry de Villiers Jr.

The Arthur production team selected Ziggy Marley and the Melody Makers to perform the theme song. Executive producer Carol Greenwald noted that the choice reflected a desire to introduce children to a range of musical styles.

=== Recording ===
Ziggy Marley recorded the vocals with the Melody Makers in Jamaica. Members of the production team traveled to Kingston for the recording session at the Bob Marley Museum.

== Release and reception ==
The song debuted with the first episode of Arthur in October 1996, on PBS Kids, and became popular among parents and children as Arthur replaced another PBS Kids series, Barney & Friends, as the top children's television program in cities.

It was released as the first track of Arthur and Friends: The First Almost Real Not Live CD (or Tape) in 1998, which was described as "the best children's album of 1998 so far" in Billboard magazine. In 2002, a remix of the song appeared on Arthur's Really Rockin' Music Mix.

The lyrics have been used by Chrissy Teigen in reference to her husband John Legend, who she says looks like Arthur. In 2022, Marc Brown used the title "Believe in Yourself" for the title of his book reflecting on Arthur.

== Covers ==
Believe in Yourself has been covered by prominent artists including the Backstreet Boys, who guest starred in the 2002 television special called "Arthur – It's Only Rock 'n' Roll" with two original songs in addition to the theme song cover.

In 2014, Chance the Rapper released a loose cover of the track with the title "Wonderful Everyday: Arthur" on SoundCloud, featuring many liberties with the tempo and song structure, and performs with The Social Experiment and Wyclef Jean, featuring layers of vocals from Frances and the Lights. Chance the Rapper performed it at Governor's Ball and Lollapalooza that year.

In 2017, Chance the Rapper joined Ziggy Marley and Jon Batiste in a performance for The Late Show with Stephen Colbert. In 2018, he recorded a cover for the closing credits of the Arthur episode, "Muffy Misses Out/Arthur Takes a Stand."

== See also ==
- Arthur
