= Ready to Learn (grant program) =

Educational programming

The Ready to Learn (RTL) Act was a project funded by the Department of Education through PBS and the Corporation for Public Broadcasting (CPB) to supply educational programming and materials for preschool and elementary school children. Created in 1992 and running until its termination in 2025, the Ready-To-Learn Act furthered the creation of the Ready-To-Learn programming block which provided eleven hours of educational programming throughout the day on the PBS channel. The initiative aimed to support low-income communities by providing educational content addressing social and emotional development as well as emphasizing language and cognitive skills for children ages 2–8 years old.

== Requirements ==
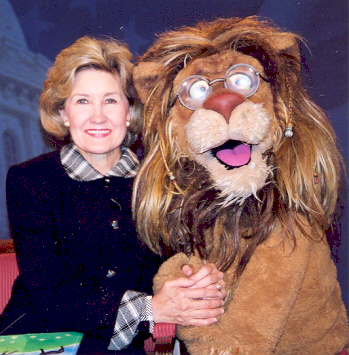
Former US senator Kay Bailey Hutchison meeting Theo from Between the Lions

In order for a program to be included in the Ready to Learn (RTL) programming block, the program was required to incorporate detailed curriculum goals that highlight either socio-emotional goals, academic goals, or both. The program creators were also required to provide a formative and summative research plan.

== History ==
=== Inception ===
In 1991, the then-president of The Carnegie Foundation for the Advancement of Teaching, Ernest Boyer, created a report titled "Ready To Learn: A Mandate for the Nation." In his report, he highlighted the decline in children's school readiness, encouraging an increase in educational materials and resources for pre-school age children.

=== 1995–2005 ===
Beginning in 1995, the Ready to Learn grant, authorized by Congress, supported the creation of the programs Dragon Tales and Between the Lions. These new programs on PBS focused on facilitating literacy as well as social and emotional learning. PBS also started unveiling community and parent programs aimed at continuing a child's learning outside of the TV.

In 2004, the channel aired new educational programs Maya and Miguel and Postcards from Buster. These shows helped further the Ready to Learn initiative. Also during this time, PBS launched the organization's first website geared towards parents and the "From The Start" website for teachers.

=== 2005–2015 ===
During this time the curriculum focus shifted to literacy. PBS debuted four new series to emphasize reading and literacy skills for young viewers: WordWorld, Martha Speaks, Super WHY!, and The Electric Company. As the digital landscape became more nuanced around the later 2000s, PBS adapted by creating new engagement activities beyond its television programs such as online games, magazines, and books. The effort also aimed to surround children in curriculum-rich content regardless of the medium they used. On a federal level, the Ready-To-Learn program began ramping up its initiative on researching children's learning methods through media.

2013 and 2014 saw the addition of shows Peg + Cat and Odd Squad which focused on teaching math and literacy skills. Content expanded across platforms to make way for new digital and interactive technologies like mobile tablets and smart boards. The broadcast network focused on providing resources to teachers and parents that detailed how to best support a child's learning in the age of multimedia instruction.

=== 2015–2020 ===
The Ready-To-Learn initiative switched its focus to personalization and community collaboration. The network launched shows such as Ready Jet Go!, The Ruff Ruffman Show, Elinor Wonders Why, Molly of Denali, The Cat in the Hat Knows a Lot About That! that focused on science inquiry and informational text. An emphasis was put on supplying RTL materials to under-resourced communities.

=== 2020–2025 ===
Entering the 2020s, PBS expressed its interest in focusing curriculum goals towards critical thinking, collaboration, functional literacy, and world of work knowledge and skills. The network also planned on expanding both its RTL television lineup as well as creating new short form video content and podcast episodes. Due to the impact of the COVID-19 pandemic, PBS also hoped to further support integrative learning that values at-home, community, and virtual learning. By then, new shows produced under the initiative also included Lyla in the Loop and Work It Out Wombats!.

On May 6, 2025, the RTL grants were abruptly terminated by the U.S. government, as part of an executive order by the second Trump administration to cease any federal funding to PBS and NPR. The Department of Education stated that the grants promoted the production of programming containing "divisive ideologies and woke propaganda" that were not aligned with the priorities of the Trump administration.

== Reception ==
=== Critical reception ===
A journal article in 2020 found that Ready-To-Learn programs boosted kids’ reading skills. Kids from low-income backgrounds were also seen making the greatest improvement. Cord Cutters News described PBS Kids Ready-To-Learn programs as ones that offer "great educational features and learning resources." Dana Anderson of Common Sense Media described the PBS Kids website to have a high educational value. She wrote, "Kids can practice a large variety of topics from letters, numbers, and logic to how to identify and talk about feelings."

=== Other networks' response ===
Partly due to the positive response and impact of Ready-To-Learn, in 1994 Nickelodeon invested $60 million and six hours a day in Nick Jr., a channel within Nickelodeon providing educational programming for preschoolers.

== Impact ==
Through RTL, PBS stations worked with local partners to provide research-driven content to low-income communities, supporting children's skill development.

=== Learning Neighborhoods ===
Led by PBS stations and local contributors, Learning Neighborhoods was a model of community engagement that aimed to empower children's learning and foster caring environments. The main goal of the project was to expand the RTL initiative into local communities across the country, providing access to learning resources. In 2019, new Learning Neighborhoods provided enhanced learning resources to communities in Pittsburgh, Austin, Detroit, New York City, Madison, Anchorage, Las Vegas, Los Angeles, Birmingham, Tallahassee, Lexington, and Owings Mills.
