= Michael Yarmush =

American-Canadian actor

- Born: Michael Lawrence Yarmush; Miami, Florida, U.S.
- Occupation: Actor
- Years active: 1993–present
- Known for: The Little Lulu Show (1996–1998); Arthur (1996–2000, 2022)

Michael Lawrence Yarmush is an American-Canadian actor. He is known for providing the original voice of Arthur Read in the PBS children's animated television series Arthur and Timmy in the Cinélume dub of Winx Club.

== Career ==
He was the very first voice actor of Arthur Read for the first five seasons of the TV series, and Arthur's Perfect Christmas. Since his voice became too deep through puberty to perform the title character's voice, Yarmush later played the recurring voice role of the Tough Customer member named Slink starting with the ninth season of the show. Twenty-two years after his departure from the role, he provided the voice of the adult Arthur in the series finale.

In 2007, he became a voice actor in the animated series Tripping the Rift, where he had the opportunity to use his voice for various characters in the series. He won a Young Artist Award in 1998 for the television series My Life as a Dog, and a Young Star Award in 1999 for his work in Arthur.

Yarmush currently works at Ubisoft Montreal as a motion capture production assistant.

== Filmography ==
=== Film ===
Year	Title	Role	Notes
1995	Kids of the Round Table	Kid of the Round Table	Uncredited
1998	Little Men	Emil	
2007	Steel Toes	Tong	
2021	Chaos Walking	Prentisstown Scout	

=== Television ===
Year	Title	Role	Notes
1995	The Little Lulu Show	Butch the Westside Boy	2 episodes
1995	Are You Afraid of the Dark?	Jonah	Episode: "The Tale of the Manaha"
1995–1996	My Life as a Dog	Eric Johansson	22 episodes
1996–1998	Stickin' Around	Additional Voices	
1996–2000; 2004–2022	Arthur	Arthur Timothy Read (Seasons 1–5; "All Grown Up") and Slink	Lead role (season 1–5), recurring (later seasons) 94 episodes
1996	Losing Chase	Little Richard Phillips	Television movie
1997	Whiskers	Fingers	Television movie
1997	Shadow of the Bear	Justin Andrich	Television movie
1997	...First Do No Harm	Mark Reimuller	Television movie
1998–2001	Radio Active	Ethan St. John	
1998	Goosebumps	Dave Warren	Episode: "Awesome Ants"
2000	Arthur's Perfect Christmas	Arthur Read (voice)	Television movie
2001–2002	Sagwa, the Chinese Siamese Cat	Wing Wing	Recurring Role
2004–2009	Winx Club	Timmy (voice)	Recurring role; 104 episodes English dub
2011	Supernatural: The Animation	Young Dean (voice)	Episode: "Rising Son" English dub

=== Awards and nominations ===
Year	Category	Award	Nominated work	Result
1998	YoungStar Awards	Best Performance by a Young Actor in a Drama TV Series	My Life as a Dog	Nominated
1998	Young Artist Awards	Best Performance in a TV Drama Series – Leading Young Actor	My Life as a Dog	Won
1999	Young Artist Awards	Best Performance in a Voice Over in a Feature or TV – Best Young Actor	Arthur	Nominated

Preceded by none	Voice of Arthur Read; 1996–2000; 2022	Succeeded by Justin Bradley
