= Sugartime! =

- Postcards from Buster episode
- Episode no.: Season 1 Episode 33
- Written by: Cydne Clark
- Original air date: February 2, 2005

Episode chronology
← Previous "Buster Gets on Board"	Next → "Buster's Sweet Song"

"Sugartime!" is the 33rd episode from season one of Postcards from Buster, originally airing on February 2, 2005. It features Buster Baxter visiting Hinesburg, Vermont to learn about the production of maple sugar. Buster also meets several children with lesbian parents, which generated significant controversy.

== Background ==
=== Postcards from Buster ===
Postcards from Buster is an American animated children's television series that originally aired on PBS. It is a spin-off of the Arthur TV series. The show features Buster Baxter, an 8-year-old anthropomorphic rabbit and Arthur's best friend. The television series was created by Cookie Jar Group (now known as WildBrain), WGBH Boston, and Marc Brown Studios. In Arthur, it is already established that Buster's parents had divorced, and his father is a pilot. This spin-off series revolves around Buster's travels with his father, Bo Baxter. Arthur Read and many other characters from Arthur make cameo appearances in this series, with many episodes featuring an Arthur character playing a minor role.

== Synopsis ==
In "Sugartime!", Buster meets the first lesbian couple: Karen Pike, a photographer, her partner Gillian Pieper, a health educator, and their three children: Emma, Emma's brother David, and her stepbrother James. One scene shows family photos of the three kids, then Buster's attention turns to a framed photo of Karen and Gillian together; Karen is Emma and David's mother, and Gillian is James' adoptive mother. Buster says to Emma, "So Gillian's your mom, too?" Emma replies that she is her stepmom, to which Buster comments "Boy, that's a lot of moms!"; Emma adds that she loves her mother and stepmother very much, and no other comments are made about the couple.

After meeting Emma's family, Buster meets another lesbian couple: Tracy and Gina, and their three children at a dairy farm nearby. Later in the episode, both families get together at a bonfire, then take a family picture, with Buster sitting in the middle between the children.

In the episode, the word lesbian or homosexual is never said, and the episode — like all Postcards episodes — has no sexual content.

== Reactions ==
In January 2005, Margaret Spellings, United States Secretary of Education, revealed that the show had explored same-sex marriage. Spellings demanded that PBS return all federal funding that had been used in the production of the episode, claiming that "many parents would not want their young children exposed to the lifestyles portrayed in this episode."

PBS decided not to air this episode to its 349 stations, but some member stations across the country chose to air the episode, including WNET in New York City, New York, KCTS-TV in Seattle, Washington, and KVIE in Sacramento, California, which are flagship stations; and the show's co-producer, WGBH in Boston, Massachusetts (which distributed the episode directly to public television stations after PBS's decision). It was, however, included in both the VHS and DVD version of the collection "Buster's Outdoor Journeys". PBS vice president of media relations Lea Sloan said at the time, "Ultimately, our decision was based on the fact that this is a sensitive issue, and we wanted to make sure that parents had the opportunity to introduce this subject to their children in their own time."

Some of these stations opted to air this episode in prime-time, with some following the episode with a local discussion on the controversy. Shortly after the controversy, PBS President and CEO Pat Mitchell announced that she would step down when her contract expired in June 2006, after coming under fire for her support for the episode. Talk show host Bill O'Reilly compared Buster visiting the lesbian couples in Vermont to visiting "a bigamy situation in Utah", or "a S&M thing in the East Village" on his former show, The O'Reilly Factor.

After the episode had aired, Pike and Pieper both appeared in a PSA by the Family Pride Coalition, along with U.S. Congressman Barney Frank, and actor BD Wong, where they denounced Spellings' decision to cut future funding for Postcards from Buster for featuring a child of a lesbian couple. Pike, Pieper, and their three children were later on honored at the Provincetown Town Hall in Provincetown, Massachusetts, as part of the Family Pride Coalition's Family Week celebration. Cusi Cram, a writer for Arthur, later wrote a play titled Dusty and the Big Bad World, based on this controversy.

In a February 2022 interview with Yahoo! Entertainment, Marc Brown expressed regret that the episode was removed from airing due to a depiction of a gay couple, and appreciated that Mr. Ratburn's wedding to another man in 2019 on the main Arthur show ("Mr. Ratburn and the Special Someone" in Season 22) was received far better due to society's progression.
