= List of Postcards from Buster episodes =

Postcards from Buster is an American animated children's television series created by Marc Brown and Natatcha Estébanez for PBS. A spin-off of Brown's other successful series Arthur, Postcards from Buster aired from October 11, 2004, to November 21, 2008, before going on hiatus, returning February 18, 2012, and then finally ending February 25, 2012.

== Series overview ==
Season	Episodes	Originally released	
Season	Episodes	First released	Last released
1	40	October 11, 2004	April 1, 2005
2	10	November 27, 2006	February 19, 2007
3	5	November 7, 2008	February 25, 2012

== Episodes ==
=== Backdoor pilot (2003) ===
No. overall	No. in season	Title	Written by	Storyboarded by	Original release date
111	6	"Postcards from Buster"	Peter K. Hirsch	Jeremy O'Neill	December 22, 2003

=== Season 1 (2004–2005) ===
No. overall	No. in season	Title	Location	Original release date
1	1	"Meet Me at the Fair"	Knox, Indiana	October 11, 2004
Buster goes to a farm in Indiana and learns doing chores Lauren and Nathan have to do every day which include, feeding the cows, taking out the garbage and cleaning the house. He also learns that some of the chores include riding horses, driving forklift tractors and showing their pigs off when the County Fair is in town.
2	2	"A Sense of Direction"	Chicago, Illinois	October 12, 2004
Buster goes to the top of Chicago's Willis Tower, for which he meets Farah, a half-Pakistani, half-Filipino Muslim girl who tells him about her Islamic life, which intrigues him into comparing her parochial school with his own school.
3	3	"Buster and Beatrice"	San Antonio, Texas	October 13, 2004
Buster goes to San Antonio and meets Robert who has been playing Conjunto music ever since he was 5. Buster also learns how to make tacos the proper way.
4	4	"The Giant Pumpkins"	Mount Hood & Canby, Oregon	October 14, 2004
Buster learns from Scotty how he grows humongous pumpkins for competitions. He also gets to do some Oregon mountain biking with Jordan and Ashley.
5	5	"Among the Hmong"	Madison, Wisconsin	October 15, 2004
Buster goes to a Southeast Asian festival in Wisconsin and meets Diana, Caitlin and Rosie who come from the same Hmong heritage and he gets to join a BBQ of many Hmong foods, which also includes hot dogs, one of his favorites.
6	6	"Sleepy in Seattle"	Seattle, Washington	October 18, 2004
Buster develops insomnia when he reaches Seattle because of all his travelling. He soon meets Russ and Rebecca and learns that Tai Chai soothes it. He also participates in the fish throwing at Pike Place Market.
7	7	"Up the River"	Mandan & Bismarck, North Dakota	October 19, 2004
Buster travels through North Dakota in the footsteps of Lewis and Clark, with the Stenslie family and learns of their Norwegian culture.
8	8	"Rodeo Cowgirl"	Houston, Texas	October 20, 2004
Buster travels to Houston, believing that Texas is only consisting of cowboys and open country. He soon meets Tayler, a granddaughter of a former African-American rodeo cowboy, Cornelius Cleveland, and she takes him out into real open country.
9	9	"Buster's Buffalo Round-Up"	Rapid City, South Dakota	October 21, 2004
Buster travels to South Dakota and learns of its traditions. He soon meets Chris, who is a direct descendant of a Lakota soldier, who takes him behind the scenes of how the Crazy Horse Memorial was made. He also gets to round-up buffalo and learns about the history of nearby Mount Rushmore.
10	10	"Moose on the Loose"	Jackson Hole, Wyoming	October 22, 2004
Buster intends to track down a moose to prove it to his friends back home. However, while he searches for it, he soon learns that Wyoming has a lot more to offer than moose, which includes fly-fishing and bird-watching.
11	11	"Rock 'n' Roll"	Boulder, Colorado	November 8, 2004
Buster goes to El Dorado Canyon and gets his first challenge of climbing steep rocks.
12	12	"Hoops and Drums"	Wind River, Wyoming	November 9, 2004
Buster travels to the Wind River reservation and learns of its native american traditions. He also learns that basketball is another important tradition and he participates in it with Stevan.
13	13	"Swimming in the Desert"	Phoenix, Arizona	November 10, 2004
Buster travels to the Brophy Sports campus in Phoenix, a training facility for swimmers. He meets Deni, who shows Buster the various ins and outs of training.
14	14	"Good Ol' Tyme"	Whitesburg, Kentucky	November 11, 2004
Buster and Binky are needed to complete a history report, but he has gone to the rural areas of Kentucky and cannot find any historical places anywhere. It is not long though when Carlos and Mora introduce him to some others and he learns of fiddling, square-dancing and traditional old time music, which he does on his report and gets an "A".
15	15	"Buster's Road Rules"	Tucson, Arizona	November 12, 2004
Carlos and Mora takes Buster on a road trip through the Sonoran Desert near Tucson and make many stops at various southern Arizona traditions along the way.
16	16	"Bayou, By Me"	Slidell & Larose, Louisiana	November 15, 2004
Buster learns that a "Swamp monster" is living in the bayous of Louisiana and he travels there to search and capture it. Along the way though, he learns various parts of Bayou life, which include crab dinners and catfishing.
17	17	"Best Friends"	Winchester, Kentucky	November 16, 2004
Buster and Arthur have an argument about the latest Bionic Bunny comic being one of theirs. Buster travels to Winchester and meets two girls both named Katie who show him that friendship is not about the things one owns, but how to care for each other and what to do together.
18	18	"Winter Gold"	Park City, Utah	November 17, 2004
Buster travels to the Utah Olympic park, the site of the 2002 Winter Olympics and meets Squirt, a talented ski-jumper, who introduces him to Olympic sports such as speed skating, luge racing and ski jumping.
19	19	"Star Search"	Charleston, South Carolina	November 18, 2004
Buster travels to Charleston and meets Justin, who is a talented 10-year-old actor, musician and athlete. Buster learns of Gullah ancestry while he travels around Charleston and St. Helena Island.
20	20	"We Are Family"	Salt Lake City, Utah	November 19, 2004
Buster spends the day in Salt Lake City with the Hirschis, a Mormon family and he learns of what it takes to run a family in a large place. Also he goes to the Dinosaur National Monument and learned about the dinosaurs that lived in the Jurassic and Cretaceous periods.
21	21	"Buster's League of Champions"	Virginia Beach, Virginia	January 3, 2005
Buster does not like the newest Bionic Bunny movie, so he decides to make suggestions for the next film and travels to Virginia Beach, where he gets numerous ideas to make a trailer.
22	22	"A Bridge Back Home"	Brooklyn, New York	January 4, 2005
Buster travels with Carlos to Brooklyn to search for his Great Uncle's oud. As with previous episodes, he meets more new friends, including a Lebanese Christian boy named Daniel, and takes part in a celebration that involves several traditional dances.
23	23	"Lost and Found"	Guanajuato, Gto., Mexico	January 5, 2005
Buster travels to Guanajuato, his first trip outside the U.S. He learns new traditions, but he cannot understand Spanish.
24	24	"The Music Mystery"	New Orleans, Louisiana	January 6, 2005
While Buster is visiting New Orleans, he learns about various traditional African celebrations and rituals, which he uses for a mystery novel that Fern is writing.
25	25	"The Low Riders"	East Los Angeles, California	January 7, 2005
Buster intends to buy a brand new Schwibbermeier 5000 bike, but the store he will get it at is closed. However, he meets up with the local Boys and Girls club and gets into the hobby of riding low-rider bikes.
26	26	"Beats by the Bay"	San Francisco, California	January 10, 2005
Buster goes to San Francisco and learns about various hip-hop dance and culture.
27	27	"A City View"	Manhattan, New York	January 11, 2005
Francine discovers in a magazine that her lifestyle is the right fit for New York. Buster travels there and meets up with a Jewish family and learns about high-rising apartments, taxis, prayer services, and that the school they attend is just like his own.
28	28	"Home Sweet Home"	Miami, Florida	January 12, 2005
Buster visits Miami and makes a food column that consists of Greek food and Cuban food. Buster becomes an amateur reporter and interviews Miami Artist Tony Mendoza. Mendoza shows Buster some of his Cuba-themed artwork, including several murals that cover the exterior walls of a store in Little Havana.
29	29	"Riding the Wave"	Cocoa Beach, Florida	January 13, 2005
Buster does some surfing off the coast of Florida with siblings Forrest and Coral.
30	30	"Buster's Lucky Year"	San Francisco, California	January 14, 2005
Buster travels to San Francisco a second time and visits Chinatown, for which he learns from two Chinese families about Chinese New Year, including the traditional meals and parade that are held for this event.
31	31	"Spring Break"	Iqaluit, Nunavut, Canada	January 31, 2005
Arthur and Buster take part in the "Ultimate Spring Break Video" contest, so they can win the new Ultimate Bionic Bunny video game. While Arthur goes to the beach, Buster goes up to cold and icy Nunavut, his first trip to Canada, but he is unable to figure out how to make a spring break video in snowy conditions.
32	32	"Buster Gets on Board"	Los Angeles, California	February 1, 2005
Buster travels to Hollywood so he can make a big star and money for a film project. He soon meets some of Sue Ellen's friends who are into skateboarding. Buster decides to make them the stars of his film.
33	33	"Sugartime!"	Hinesburg, Vermont	February 2, 2005
Buster heads to Vermont during sugartime season and samples maple syrup, and learns about milking cows. He also shops for a bonfire, and meets children of lesbian parents.
34	34	"Buster's Sweet Song"	Leiper's Fork, Tennessee	February 3, 2005
Buster needs a song that will fit with Muffy's dad's car commercial. The band, Los Viajeros, cannot make car commercials so he tries to find better inspiration. Billy Dean guest stars.
35	35	"Family Reunion"	Nashville, Tennessee	February 4, 2005
While Arthur and Buster are at their family reunion, D.W. and Buster meet a Kurdish family and realizes family values.
36	36	"Alien Adventure"	Roswell, New Mexico	March 28, 2005
Buster is searching for a UFO and visits a museum of science fiction. He meets Arthur's former school Janitor, Mr. Morris.
37	37	"Coming Together"	Seattle, Washington	March 29, 2005
Buster makes a second visit to Seattle and learns how to help a friend at church.
38	38	"Treasure Island"	San Juan, Puerto Rico	March 30, 2005
Buster travels to the Caribbean islands for the first time. Carlos is suffering from amnesia but he says that a mystery box, held by his cousin, is the key to his memories.
39	39	"Step By Step"	Hartford, Connecticut	March 31, 2005
Buster meets a Puerto Rican dancer who is hearing impaired. He then shows Francine and Sue Ellen how to do a Puerto Rican dance.
40	40	"Buster's Big Goal"	East Boston, Massachusetts	April 1, 2005
Buster goes to the Boston Piers and he soon learns from a Brazilian kid that he will be able to succeed his soccer goal at his Elwood City home game.

=== Season 2 (2006–2007) ===
No. overall	No. in season	Title	Location	Original release date
41	1	"Mykala, Pono & Buster's Big Hawaii Show"	The Big Island, Hawaii	November 27, 2006
Buster travels with Los Viajeros to the Big Island of Hawaii and learns about the volcanos, such as Kilauea and Mauna Loa. He also gets to learn about hula dancing and swims with the dolphins.
42	2	"The Mitten of Mackinac Island"	Mackinac Island, Michigan	December 4, 2006
Buster travels to Mackinac island, Bo's favorite vacation spot. But when he gets there, he thinks the place is more like a ghost town as the entire island and all facilities including the Grand Hotel are empty. He soon discovers that is actually because it is winter and most of the facilities are closed. Buster soon meets Lou Clark, which the school he and his group attends is very small. Buster, Lou, and Scott make a movie about the War of 1812.
43	3	"Buster's Baseball Merengue"	Dominican Republic	December 11, 2006
Buster realizes that Damon and Bateria, his favorite players on the Elwood Grebes, have been traded. He decides to scout the Dominican Republic for a new talent. Buster manages to get Los Viajeros to develop a music album of merengue. He also, unexpectedly, comes across a player from the Grebes.
44	4	"The Case of the Coin Purloined"	Fort Leonard Wood, Missouri	December 18, 2006
Los Viajeros go to Fort Leonard and are provided with a "Coin of Excellence". Carlos gives the coin to Buster, but he loses it. Buster discovers a note that mysteriously appeared in his pocket, which makes him believe that the coin was stolen. After meeting Erin, Buster heads out into the desert and eventually discovers what happened to the coin and he gets a reward of his own for his work.
45	5	"Philadelphia Masala"	Philadelphia, Pennsylvania	January 8, 2007
After having problems with the food on the plane, Buster travels to Philadelphia and meets various Indian religions and foods and discovers a solution.
46	6	"A Capital Egg Hunt"	Washington, D.C.	January 15, 2007
Buster travels to Washington, D.C. and misses the D.C. Easter egg hunt. He decides to create his very own egg hunt that involves the use of riddles.
47	7	"La Belle Poutine"	Montreal, Québec, Canada	January 22, 2007
Buster travels to Montreal and films scenes that Carlos and Mora went on their honeymoon. He also visits a hockey rink and tries more new food.
48	8	"Your Friend, My Friend"	Encinitas, California & Tijuana, Mexico	January 29, 2007
Mr. Ratburn wants the class to write to their pen pals in Encinitas and Buster travels there to meet up with Kyle, his own pen pal. After participating in a beach cleanup, he travels to Tijuana and meets another set of pen pals. Field produced by Patricia Alvarado Nuñez and Alan Grazioso.
49	9	"This Just In!"	Talladega and Lincoln, Alabama	February 5, 2007
A news story is being sponsored by a TV station for a contest and Mr. Ratburn gives it a chance for the students to take extra credit. Buster has traveled to Alabama and wants to do a story about motor racing, but it is off-season and no one is racing at Talladega Superspeedway (which in real life has a museum). He goes to the Alabama School for the Blind and he soon discovers that a journalist does not need to manufacture news but keep his senses open. Note: This episode aired during Daytona Speedweeks, days before the 2007 NASCAR Nextel Cup Series season-opening Daytona 500.
50	10	"Back to the Bayou"	New Orleans & Slidell, Louisiana	February 19, 2007
Buster makes a second visit to Louisiana after hearing about the devastation of Hurricane Katrina. Along with other Elwood City friends and families, he brings food and clothing to help out the survivors. Buster's family and Arthur's family watch his video postcard of his previous Louisiana trip (the episode had aired 7 months before Katrina struck in August 2005) and they learn about what had happened them during Katrina and how their lives have changed.

=== Season 3 (2008–2012) ===
All episodes from Season 3 take place outside of North America.

No. overall	No. in season	Title	Location	Original release date
51	1	"Ciao Buster"	Venice, Italy	November 7, 2008
Buster and Bo go on a vacation to the ancient city of Venice, Italy. While he is there, Buster learns all about the transport that involves the use of gondoliers instead of autos. He tries to track the Murano Glass Factory. The Baxters get hopelessly lost among the winding byways, palazzos, alleys and canals.
52	2	"Buster in Beijing"	Beijing, China	November 14, 2008
Buster travels to Beijing to come up with party ideas for Muffy's lawn extravaganza. The 2008 Summer Olympics has recently taken place, but Buster has other plans on his mind. He encounters kids who use their talents to help meet needs in their communities, which inspires Buster to start giving back to Elwood City.
53	3	"Buster's Egyptian Adventure"	Cairo, Egypt	November 21, 2008
Buster becomes infatuated with Egypt after playing a video game with Arthur. When he travels there, he discovers that, aside from the Egyptian pyramids, there is much to explore in the bustling streets of Cairo with its towering mosque minarets, colorful markets, and donkeys and carts and fresh-fruit vendors.
54	4	"Finding Family in Chennai"	Chennai, India	February 18, 2012
Buster needs to make a family tree for social studies class.
55	5	"Vamos, Buster"	Santiago, Chile	February 25, 2012
Buster is excited to visit Chile, but is afraid he won't be daring enough to keep up with the locals.
