= Mr. Ratburn and the Special Someone =

1st segment of the 22nd season of Arthur

- Arthur episode
- Multiple critics praised the reveal of Mr. Ratburn's true fiancé Patrick (pictured, left) as unremarkable.
- Episode no.: Season 22; Episode 1a
- Directed by: Greg Bailey
- Written by: Peter K. Hirsch
- Production code: 2201A
- Original air date: May 13, 2019

Guest appearance
- Jane Lynch as Patty

Episode chronology
← Previous "Pal and the Big Itch"	Next → "The Feud"
- Arthur season 22

"Mr. Ratburn and the Special Someone" is the first segment (Note: Episodes of Arthur typically consist of two 11-minute segments.) of the first episode of the 22nd season of the animated edutainment television series Arthur. It was the first episode of Arthur to feature a same-sex wedding, a depiction that resulted in two PBS member stations in Arkansas and Alabama choosing not to air the episode's premiere on May 13, 2019.

In the segment, Arthur and his friends mistakenly believe their teacher Mr. Ratburn is marrying a woman named Patty (voiced by guest star Jane Lynch) who will make him an even tougher educator, only to later learn that he is marrying a kind chocolatier named Patrick. "Mr. Ratburn and the Special Someone" received positive critical reviews and a nomination for the GLAAD Media Award for Outstanding Kids and Family Programming but garnered a negative response from the Christian fundamentalist website One Million Moms.

== Plot ==
Arthur and his friends learn that their teacher Mr. Ratburn is getting married after he receives a phone call during class from someone named Patty. Later at the diner, Arthur, Francine, Buster, and Muffy speculate about who would want to marry Mr. Ratburn when he and Patty appear. Arthur and his friends overhear Patty, who intends to take charge of the wedding planning efforts, say that she intends to toughen Mr. Ratburn up. Fearing that a tougher Mr. Ratburn will make their lives more difficult, Arthur and friends make a plan to portray Mr. Ratburn as extremely laid-back, the opposite of Patty's personality, so that she will not want to marry him.

Arthur and Buster trick Mr. Ratburn into recording himself reading a book for young children, which they then edit over a manipulated photo of him dressed as a hippie. Francine delivers the video to Patty, who laughs it off to the kids' surprise. Arthur and Francine initiate a plan to connect Mr. Ratburn with the town's librarian, Ms. Turner. They visit a chocolate shop where they meet its owner, Patrick, and discuss their plan. Patrick is unsure that chocolate can make two people fall in love, but he ultimately supports their plan. However, they are unable to trick Mr. Ratburn into visiting the library. When he asks them to return a book of love poems for him instead, they slip a romantic poem purporting to be from Mr. Ratburn to Ms. Turner into the book. When she sees that the note is riddled with typos, she returns it to them, unconvinced.

Having exhausted their other options, Arthur and his friends decide to object to the wedding at the ceremony. They back out at the last minute, but in doing so discover that Patty is actually Mr. Ratburn's older sister, not his betrothed. At that moment, Mr. Ratburn walks down the aisle with his actual fiancé: Patrick the chocolatier.

== Production and broadcast ==
Written by Arthur head writer Peter K. Hirsch, "Mr. Ratburn and the Special Someone" premiered on May 13, 2019, along with its sister episode, "The Feud". Jane Lynch made a guest appearance in the episode, voicing Mr. Ratburn's sister Patty. The episode marked the first appearance of a gay wedding in an episode of Arthur in the 23 years it had been running as of 2019. However, it was not the first appearance of gay characters in an Arthur property; "Sugartime!", a 2005 episode of the spinoff show Postcards from Buster, featured a girl with two mothers. According to PBS's Maria Vera Whelan, the network "believe[s] it is important to represent the wide array of adults in the lives of children who look to PBS Kids every day."

The episode was not aired in several television markets. PBS member Alabama Public Television opted not to broadcast the episode, showing an Arthur rerun in its place. The network's director of programming, Mike McKenzie, said that the decision was made because some children might watch the episode without their parents, and some children younger than the episode's target demographic might watch the segment. Alabama Public Television had also rejected an episode of Postcards from Buster that depicted a same-sex couple in 2005. Arkansas Educational Television Network similarly did not air the episode on May 13, though they did air the episode several times later that month and in June 2019 on their PBS Kids subchannels in the evening, overnight, and early morning hours. The First United Methodist Church in Birmingham, Alabama, announced that they would show the episode in a public screening that attracted RSVPs from over 100 people.

== Reception ==
Gwen Aviles wrote on NBCNews.com that "Mr. Ratburn and the Special Someone" "received overwhelmingly glowing reviews", with some dissenting opinions. Multiple critics praised how the episode treated the reveal that Mr. Ratburn was marrying a man as unremarkable; Helen Armitage in Screen Rant described the segment as groundbreaking for "how without fanfare and matter-of-factly Mr. Ratburn's sexuality is revealed", and Vox's Allegra Frank wrote that the segment "refreshingly avoids presenting it [the wedding] as 'different' or 'non-traditional,' and simply shows that it is worthy of celebration, just like any happy marriage."

The Christian fundamentalist website One Million Moms, meanwhile, initiated a petition that garnered at least 13,000 signatures calling for the episode to be removed from TV schedules for what the organization described as the promotion of same-sex marriage. The segment was nominated at the 31st GLAAD Media Awards in 2020 for Outstanding Kids and Family Programming, losing to The Bravest Knight and High School Musical: The Musical: The Series.

In The Atlantic, Ashley Fetters and Natalie Escobar described the episode as "a poignant moment in children's TV history" considering that LGBTQ characters appeared infrequently in children's programming, and in particular on public-access television. Reactions to the episode were contrasted to reactions to Postcards from Buster's "Sugartime!" 14 years prior, which PBS ultimately pulled from its schedule due to pressure from the United States Department of Education, one of the show's funders. Jude Dry in IndieWire said that PBS "fumbled the ball on LGBTQ representation in 2005" for its treatment of "Sugartime!" but found Mr. Ratburn's wedding to be "a quiet moment, but a groundbreaking one".
