= Arthur season 18 =

Season of television series

Arthur
- Season 18
- No. of episodes: 10 (19 segments)

Release
- Original network: PBS Kids
- Original release: September 29, 2014 – September 10, 2015

Season chronology
- ← Previous; Season 17 Next → Season 19

The eighteenth season of the television series Arthur aired from September 29, 2014 to September 10, 2015 on PBS Kids and comprised 10 episodes. William Healy replaces Drew Adkins as Arthur, Andrew Dayton replaces Jake Beale as D.W., and Max Friedman Cole replaces Siam Yu as Brain for part of the season continuing permanently for the next season.

== Episodes ==
No. overall	No. in season	Title	Written by	Storyboard by	Original release date
206a	1a	"The Friend Who Wasn't There"	Craig Carlisle & Peter K. Hirsch	Gerry Capelle	September 29, 2014
Muffy goes into her basement to find her imaginary friend.
206b	1b	"Surprise!"	Ken Scarborough	Allan Jeffery	September 29, 2014
Francine is upset when she is forbidden to attend Catherine's 16th birthday party, so she tries to get back at her sister by crashing the party uninvited and humiliating her.
207a	2a	"The Case of the Girl with the Long Face"	Matt Hoverman	Jeremy O'Neill	September 30, 2014
George hires Buster to find out why Fern is feeling sad.
207b	2b	"The Substitute Arthur"	Ken Scarborough	Rick Marshall	September 30, 2014
While Arthur is on a trip for the weekend, Buster must find someone else to hang out with.
208a	3a	"The Tattletale Frog"	Ken Scarborough	Rick Marshall	October 1, 2014
When D.W. accidentally breaks a singing frog figurine while playing a game with Bud, they try to hide the evidence, but end up making a bigger mess. At first, Bud takes the blame for the mess, but D.W. eventually has a crisis of conscience and explains why she made the mess.
208b	3b	"D.W. & Bud's Higher Purpose"	Peter K. Hirsch	Jeremy O'Neill	October 1, 2014
D.W. and Bud are too short to go on a roller coaster, The Buzzard, so they try to trick the ride attendant into letting them get on, but nothing works.
209a	4a	"Best Wishes"	Dietrich Smith & Peter K. Hirsch	Gerry Capelle	October 2, 2014
George's friends pressure him into wishing for school-closing snow.
209b	4b	"The Tardy Tumbler"	Matt Hoverman	Allan Jeffery	October 2, 2014
Prunella struggles with getting up early for her gymnastics class.
210a	5a	"Fountain Abbey"	Kathy Waugh	Gerry Capelle	January 26, 2015
Muffy is sad to discover that one of her ancestors worked as a maid for one of Binky's ancestors - a lord. Upon further investigation, Muffy finds out how that maid got promoted to a business manager.
210b	5b	"Arthur Calls It"	Craig Carlisle & Peter K. Hirsch	Rick Marshall	January 26, 2015
Arthur umpires a baseball game, and he has to decide whether or not Buster properly scored a home run. When he judges in the opposing team's favor, Francine, Muffy, and Buster accuse him of making the wrong choice.
211a	6a	"Whip. Mix. Blend."	Peter K. Hirsch	Allan Jeffery	September 7, 2015 (Note: This episode was first released on Arthur's Fountain Abbey DVD on January 27, 2015.)
When Rattles and his mom are invited to stay at her boyfriend, Archie Vanderloo's house for a weekend, Rattles is worried about fitting in with Archie's twin kids, Angie and Ansel. Angie speaks in weird slang that Rattles can almost never understand, while Ansel is overly competitive. The rest of the Tough Customers try to help Rattles prepare for his visit.
211b	6b	"Staycation"	Kathy Waugh	Gerry Capelle	September 7, 2015
Arthur and D.W. want to give Mr. and Mrs. Read a vacation, so they suggest that they sit outside and relax. As chaos slowly builds up inside the house, Arthur is determined not to ruin their vacation by calling them for help.
212a	7a	"Two Minutes"	Ken Scarborough	Gerry Capelle	June 1, 2015
Timmy is outraged when he discovers that Tommy was born two minutes before he was. Timmy, angry by his brother acting superior, calls on D.W. to put Tommy in his place.
212b	7b	"Messy Dress Mess"	Raye Lankford	Mitch Manzer	June 1, 2015
Ladonna accidentally ruins a fancy dress Muffy lends her.
213a	8a	"Arthur Read: Super Saver"	Raye Lankford	Mitch Manzer	September 9, 2015
Arthur tries to cut down on the cost of bills for his parents.
213b	8b	"Tibbles to the Rescue"	Matt Hoverman	Jeremy O'Neill	September 9, 2015
D.W. saves the Tibbles from a fall, and they feel the need to repay her, much to D.W.'s annoyance.
214a	9a	"The Pageant Pickle"	Ken Scarborough	Jeremy O'Neill	September 10, 2015
Arthur is embarrassed about having to go see D.W.'s spring pageant.
214b	9b	"Some Assembly Required"	Craig Carlisle	Rick Marshall	September 10, 2015
D.W. is waiting for her new playground to be built, and all she has to play with is the box that it came in. She, Bud, and Emily see the box as a spacecraft, and they journey to a distant planet, where they encounter strange creatures of many varieties.
215	10	"Shelter from the Storm"	Peter K. Hirsch	Allan Jeffery & Wayne Lee Pack	September 8, 2015
When a powerful hurricane hits Elwood City, Arthur and his friends are affected by it in various ways. Arthur starts a campaign to reunite lost pets with their owners. The first floor of the Crosswires' house is flooded, forcing them to stay in a homeless shelter until their house gets cleaned up. With Mr. Compson being very busy, Ladonna fears that he will not come home in time for her birthday. Meanwhile, the Brain gets traumatized after seeing the destruction of his family's ice cream shop and develops a fear of the wind, so he begins seeing a psychiatrist (voiced by Idina Menzel).
