= Arthur season 23 =

Arthur
- Season 23
- No. of episodes: 3 (5 segments)

Release
- Original network: PBS Kids
- Original release: October 14 – October 16, 2019

Season chronology
- ← Previous; Season 22 Next → Season 24

The twenty-third season of Arthur started airing on PBS Kids in the United States on October 14, 2019. R.L. Stine guest starred on the episode "Fright Night" as Buster's Uncle Bob.

== Episodes ==
No. overall	No. in season	Title	Written by	Storyboard by	Original release date	Prod. code
244a	1a	"Fright Night"	Jonathan Greenberg	Jeremy O'Neill	October 14, 2019	2301A
Buster's uncle, Bob Baxter, tells him a story about a creature called the lycanbunny. Guest appearance: R. L. Stine as Bob Baxter.
244b	1b	"Citizen Cheikh"	Cliff Ruby & Elana Lesser	Karine Charlebois	October 14, 2019	2301B
The Brain’s cousin, Cheikh, and his family (from “In My Africa”) prepare to be American citizens.
245	2	"When Duty Calls"	Matt Hoverman	Allan Jeffery & Karine Charlebois	October 16, 2019	2302
Arthur and his friends try to make Ladonna feel better about her family's move to Oregon.
246a	3a	"The Pea and the Princess"	Jeff Goode	Karine Charlebois	October 15, 2019	2303A
Prunella directs a play based on the fairy tale "The Princess and the Pea."
246b	3b	"D.W. and Dr. Whosit"	Adam Rudman	Hélène Cossette	October 15, 2019	2303B
D.W. is tempted to watch a show that Mr. and Mrs. Read think she is too young to see.

== Production ==
Oasis Animation produced the 23rd season of Arthur. Oasis Animation started producing Arthur episodes from Season 20.
