= Arthur Takes a Stand =

- Arthur episode
- Title card
- Episode no.: Season 21; Episode 4b
- Directed by: Greg Bailey
- Written by: Peter Hirsch
- Production code: 236b
- Original air date: February 12, 2018

Guest appearance
- John Lewis as himself

Episode chronology
← Previous "Muffy Misses Out"	Next → "Slink's Special Talent"
- Arthur (season 21)

"Arthur Takes a Stand" is the second segment of the fourth episode of the 21st season of Arthur. It originally aired on PBS Kids in the United States on February 12, 2018. "Arthur Takes a Stand" was written by Peter Hirsch and storyboarded by Cilbur Rocha. In the episode, Arthur learns that his school's lunch lady, Mrs. MacGrady, has to do all her work by herself. He attempts to get the principal to hire an assistant for her, but his request is denied. Through advice and encouragement from his friend Sue Ellen and civil rights leader John Lewis, Arthur gets the rest of his class to participate in a sit-in protest.

== Plot ==
At Lakewood Elementary, principal Ms. Tingley announces that breakfast will be served in the school cafeteria, and that civil rights leader John Lewis will be visiting the school. The next morning, the students enjoy the breakfast, and Arthur talks to Mrs. MacGrady as she is clearing the tables. He is surprised to learn that she does all the cafeteria work by herself, without any assistance. Arthur goes to the principal's office, where he asks Ms. Tingley to hire more cafeteria staff, and she answers that the school does not have the budget for it.

Arthur's friend Sue Ellen suggests that he start a boycott. Arthur goes to Mrs. MacGrady with a "Boycott Breakfast" poster, although she states that serving breakfast was her own decision. In the library, Arthur has a nightmare where Mrs. MacGrady is overworked from breakfast being served 24 hours a day; he awakes to find John Lewis sitting at the table with him. Lewis advises Arthur to be persistent in his protesting.

After breakfast the next day, Arthur continues to sit at his table, starting a sit-in protest. Mrs. MacGrady joins him, agreeing that not getting any help is unfair. The entire class slowly joins Arthur's protest. Ms. Tingley enters and demands them to stop; however, Mrs. MacGrady refuses to leave until she is guaranteed to get an assistant. Lewis enters and recognizes Mrs. MacGrady as an old friend from the March on Washington, also joining the sit-in. Finally, Ms. Tingley decides to write to the school board and request more money. Lewis tells Arthur, "There's nothing more important than following your conscience. If you can do that, you're always going to sleep well" as the episode ends.

== Production ==
Marc Brown, creator of the Arthur franchise, had met Lewis at the National Press Club and got the idea to have him appear on the show. Carol Greenwald, executive producer of Arthur, wrote that Lewis was excited to appear on the show, although he corrected facts about his history in the writing and rejected initial character designs. In one, he was depicted as "a really cuddly teddy bear"; Lewis denied it, stating that "I just don't look like that" and opting for a more realistic design. However, during Lewis's voice line recording sessions, Greenwald was impressed by "his warmth and his openness and also just his willingness to jump in and have some fun."

The writer of "Arthur Takes a Stand," Peter Hirsch, described that the episode aims to "explore how a young kid can protest." In order to teach "one, how to protest, and two, empathy," the episode is about "Arthur [identifying] an injustice that [is]n't necessarily happening to him and to feel strongly enough to want to do something about it." In writing the episode, Hirsch was careful to "have a little bit of bite but not be so out there that the kids [a]re putting themselves in jeopardy." Greenwald said that the writing "definitely is in line with all that we’ve done always on Arthur, which is to bring in diverse viewpoints and interesting guest stars and think about topics that a lot of other kids’ series might not."

In the episode, Mrs. MacGrady is revealed to have been a political activist. Hirsch described that this was "perfect" for the character, as the staff "had always envisioned her as a child of the ’60s. She's a lot hipper than you would know unless you talked to her."

== Reception ==
After the episode's release, Greenwald noted that it received "a lot of really positive responses," but also a few about "people saying we shouldn't be showing kids stuff like this." She responded that "not all kids" can be "protected from these issues," and that "[t]hat's part of what our goal with Arthur is, to be sharing these experiences broadly so kids of all kinds can understand and build empathy."

== Legacy ==
An animated short titled "Arthur on Racism: Talk, Listen, and Act" was produced in memory of John Lewis in August 2020. In the video, Arthur and Buster ask Mrs. MacGrady what they can do to help fight racism. The short was written in response to the murder of George Floyd in May 2020, and features Arthur and Buster's solemn reactions to watching a video that happened in Elwood City. After John Lewis's death, the Arthur Facebook account made a post commemorating Lewis, and "Arthur Takes a Stand" was made available for free on the PBS Kids website and app.
