= Postcards from Buster =

Animated children's television series

- Created by: Marc Brown (characters); Natatcha Estébanez
- Based on: Arthur episode from Season 8, Postcards from Buster written by Peter K. Hirsch
- Voices of: Daniel Brochu
- Theme music composer: Ray Fabi; Mitch Knowles; Bill McRae
- Opening theme: "Hey Buster" performed by Wyclef Jean featuring 3 on 3
- Ending theme: "Hey Buster" (instrumental)
- Composer: Claudio Ragazzi
- Countries of origin: United States; Canada
- Original language: English
- No. of seasons: 3
- No. of episodes: 55 (list of episodes)

Production
- Executive producers: Marc Brown; James Atoka; Pierre Valette
- Producers: Tolon Brown; Lesley Taylor; Patricia Alvarado Nuñez; Alan Catello Grazioso
- Editors: Jean Dunoyer; Cherry Enoki
- Running time: 22 minutes
- Production companies: Marc Brown Studios; WGBH Boston; Cookie Jar Entertainment

Original release
- Network: PBS Kids Go!
- Release: October 11, 2004 – February 25, 2012

Related
- Arthur

Postcards from Buster is an animated children's television series that originally aired on PBS. It is a spin-off of the Arthur TV series. The show features Buster Baxter, an 8-year-old anthropomorphic rabbit and Arthur's best friend. The television series was created by Cookie Jar Group (now known as WildBrain), WGBH Boston, and Marc Brown Studios.

A backdoor pilot episode for the series, also titled "Postcards from Buster," originally aired as part of Arthur's eighth season on December 22, 2003. The official series aired on PBS Kids Go! from October 11, 2004, to February 20, 2012. The series went on a 3–year hiatus between November 2008 and February 2012.

In Arthur, it is already established that Buster's parents had divorced, and his father is a pilot. This spin-off series revolves around Buster's travels with his father, Bo Baxter. Arthur Read and many other characters from Arthur make cameo appearances in this series, with many episodes featuring an Arthur character playing a minor role.

== Premise ==
Postcards from Buster featured Buster travelling to various locations across North, Central, South America and Europe. Episodes primarily took place in the United States, but also featured many destinations in the Caribbean, Mexico, Canada, Cuba, the Dominican Republic, Brazil, Italy, and many other places. Buster is accompanied by his father, who is a pilot for a band of musicians. In each episode, Buster meets children in the location who introduce him to their real-life families and provide insights into global culture.

The sequences featuring Buster are animated, while the segments showcasing the children are live-action, presented from the perspective of Buster's video camcorder. After each location, Buster sends his friend Arthur a "video postcard" tape, providing a summary of his experiences and the people he has met in that specific location.

The series aimed to showcase multicultural and diverse families, including a Muslim family in Illinois, a Mormon family in Utah, and a Mestizo family in Texas, among others.

== Episodes ==
Season	Episodes	Originally released	
Season	Episodes	First released	Last released
1	40	October 11, 2004	April 1, 2005
2	10	November 27, 2006	February 19, 2007
3	5	November 7, 2008	February 25, 2012

== Cast ==
- Daniel Brochu as Buster Baxter
- Ellen David as Bitzi Baxter
- Marcel Jeannin as Bo Baxter
- Elyzabeth Diaga (season 1) and Stephanie Martin (seasons 2–3) as Mora of Los Viajeros
- Norman Groulx (season 1) and Glenn Coulson (seasons 2–3) as Carlos of Los Viajeros
- Cameron Ansell (seasons 1–2) and Dallas Jokic (season 3) as Arthur Read
- Jason Szwimmer (seasons 1–2) and Robert Naylor (season 3) as D. W. Read
- Melissa Altro as Muffy Crosswire
- Jodie Resther as Francine Frensky

== Development ==
The series was announced on May 30, 2003, by CINAR, WGBH Boston, and Marc Brown Studios, for a Fall 2004 premiere on PBS Kids. The series was marketed for an older audience than Arthur and would utilize live-action and animation. CINAR held worldwide distribution rights to the property, except in the United States.

== Home media releases ==
Paramount Home Entertainment has released a series of "Postcards from Buster" DVDs and VHS tapes focusing on specific topics. The releases include themed DVDs of "Postcards from Buster", such as "Buster's Outdoor Journeys", which features episodes like "Sugartime", "Meet Me at the Fair", "The Giant Pumpkins", and "Bayou by Me". Another release is "Buster's Got the Beat", which includes episodes like "Beats by the Bay", "Buster and Beatrice", "The Music Mystery", and "Buster's Sweet Song". There is also "Buster's Buddies", featuring episodes like "Buster's League of Champions", "Best Friends", "A Sense of Direction", and "Sleepy in Seattle". Additionally, there is "Buster's World of Sports", which includes episodes like "Winter Gold", "Swimming in the Desert", "Rock and Roll", and "Rodeo Cowgirl". VHS releases only include the first two episodes from each DVD.

On October 12, 2010, Mill Creek Entertainment released the complete first season on DVD in Region 1. It also includes bonus episodes of Busytown Mysteries, The New Adventures of Nanoboy, Mona the Vampire, and Wimzie's House.

== "Sugartime!" controversy ==
In "Sugartime!", Buster meets lesbian couples and their children while visiting Vermont to learn how to make maple sugar. The United States Secretary of Education, Margaret Spellings, demanded that PBS return all federal funding that had been used in the production of the episode, claiming that "many parents would not want their young children exposed to the lifestyles portrayed in this episode." PBS decided not to air this episode to its 349 stations, but some member stations across the country chose to air the episode, including WNET in New York City, New York, KCTS-TV in Seattle, Washington, and KVIE in Sacramento, California, which are flagship stations; and the show's co-producer, WGBH in Boston, Massachusetts (which distributed the episode directly to public television stations after PBS's decision). It was, however, included in both the VHS and DVD version of the collection "Buster's Outdoor Journeys".

In a February 2022 interview with Yahoo! Entertainment, Marc Brown expressed regret that the episode was removed from airing due to a depiction of a gay couple, and appreciated that Mr. Ratburn's wedding to another man in 2019 on the main Arthur show ("Mr. Ratburn and the Special Someone" in Season 22) was received far better due to society's progression.
