= Is There a Doctor in the House? =

Is There a Doctor in the House? may refer to:

- "Is There a Doctor in the House?" (Arthur)
- "Is There a Doctor in the House?" (The Brady Bunch)
- "Is There a Doctor in the House?" (Doctors)
- "Is There a Doctor in the House?" (Real Housewives of Atlanta)

== See also ==
- Is There a Doctor in the Mouse?, a Tom and Jerry cartoon
