= Arthur season 9 =

Arthur
- Season 9
- No. of episodes: 10 (20 segments)

Release
- Original network: PBS Kids Go!
- Original release: December 27, 2004 – April 8, 2005

Season chronology
- ← Previous; Season 8 Next → Season 10

The ninth season of the television series Arthur was originally broadcast on PBS Kids Go! in the United States from December 27, 2004, to April 8, 2005, and contains 10 episodes. Cameron Ansell, Jessica Kardos, Eleanor Noble, and Tyler Brody-Stein replace Mark Rendall, Patricia Rodriguez, Evan Smirnow, and Aaron Grunfield as the voices of Arthur Read, Sue Ellen Armstrong, George Lundgren, and Tommy Tibble, respectively. It is also the last season to feature Alex Hood as Alan "Brain" Powers and Samuel Holden as Timmy Tibble; Paul-Stuart Brown would step in to voice the former character for a few episodes before permanently taking on the role in the next season. CINAR got rebrand by Cookie Jar Entertainment, until it got merged with DHX Media in 2012, after the 15th season.

== Episodes ==
No. overall	No. in season	Title	Written by	Storyboard by	Original release date	Prod. code
116a	1a	"Castles in the Sky"	Peter K. Hirsch	Jeremy O'Neill	December 27, 2004	116A
Arthur's tree house falls apart due to hefty snow, so Arthur and his friends come up with their own designs to re-build it, while getting help from famous architect Frank Gehry.
116b	1b	"Tipping the Scales"	Alan Silberberg	Robert Yap	December 27, 2004	119A
The school choir is excited about performing at a recital in Crown City. Unfortunately, Ms. Krasny is sick and Dr. Fugue (from "Arthur Plays the Blues") returns, substituting for her, and this time he means business. On the way to Crown City, the roads are blocked due to a snowstorm and the class has to perform their recital at a nearby diner.
117a	2a	"Francine's Big Top Trouble"	Adam Felber	Ivan Tankushev	December 28, 2004	117B
Francine attends circus camp, and tries to perform better than Catherine. She finds herself unable to perform the same stunts as her sister, until she discovers she is good at clowning around.
117b	2b	"George Blows His Top"	Courtney Lilly	Gerry Capelle	December 28, 2004	116B
George is increasingly bothered when Buster starts to influence his kindness. Buster finally discovers the mistake of his ways, and he apologizes.
118a	3a	"Arthur Weighs In"	Raye Lankford	Francois Brisson	December 29, 2004	120A
After being unable to fit into his costume during rehearsals for a play, Arthur looks for ways to lose weight. Note: This episode was removed from its rerun in 2020 along with its sister episode due perceived comments of Arthur being fat-shamed for being "a little husky".
118b	3b	"The Law of the Jungle Gym"	Matt Steinglass	Gerry Capelle, Ivan Tankushev & Francois Brisson	December 29, 2004	118A
The playground's jungle gym is the Tough Customers' hangout spot, leading to arguments when Muffy gets a new camera and wants to take photos from the jungle gym.
119a	4a	"Buster's Green Thumb"	Written by : Peter K. Hirsch; Idea by : Catherine Lieuwen	Jeremy O'Neill	December 30, 2004	120B
Buster decides to try his own hand at gardening in the community garden after using out home-grown compost on tomatoes and finding out that commercial ones do not taste as good. He also becomes friends with the garden's caretaker, Fritz Langley.
119b	4b	"My Fair Tommy"	Dietrich Smith	Stéfanie Gignac	December 30, 2004	117A
Fed up with punishments for incidents Timmy causes (like ruining D.W's Good Behavior Award cupcake), Tommy asks D.W. to teach him good manners to prepare for Parent-Visiting Day and get a chance to win the Good Behavior Award. D.W. is reluctant at first, but when Emily proposes a chance, D.W. gives in and teaches Tommy good manners.
120a	5a	"Lights, Camera... Opera!"	Peter K. Hirsch	Stéfanie Gignac	December 31, 2004	119A
Muffy isn't thrilled about going to see an opera performance of Carmen, fearing that it will be boring. Guest star: Rodney Gilfrey as himself.
120b	5b	"All Worked Up"	Daisy Scott	Jeremy O'Neill	December 31, 2004	118B
Arthur aces five quizzes in a row, but his and D.W.'s luck run out when Mrs. Read takes a client and they believe that she will not be around as often.
121a	6a	"Arthur Makes Waves"	Raye Lankford	Patricia Atchinson & Robert Yap	April 4, 2005	123A
When Elwood City's temperature rises, Arthur and D.W. want to go swimming, but they notice the community pool is closed for repairs, so James invites them to his pool for a party, but Arthur is shocked to find out that Molly is James' older sister. Fortunately, both have fun together and become close friends, but avoid each other in public because their own friend groups will be unimproved.
121b	6b	"It Came from Beyond"	Peter K. Hirsch	Gerry Capelle	April 4, 2005	124B
On a dark and stormy night, Grandma Thora finds a stray dog named Killer on her porch. Killer turns out to be a bully, intimidating D.W., Kate, Pal, and Amigo. Kate and the other dogs doubt that they like Killer, but reconsider after Killer rescues Nemo from a tree.
122a	7a	"Three's a Crowd"	Hilary Selden Illick	Stéfanie Gignac	April 5, 2005	123B
Prunella's favorite time in the mornings is doing yoga with her mother, Mrs. Deegan, but she is jealous when Marina joins in with better poses, as Prunella has trouble posing her legs over her shoulders and she gets stuck. Later, Prunella thinks that Marina is "stealing" Mrs. Deegan from her, but Mrs. Deegan assures her that she will never like Marina as much as her daughter.
122b	7b	"A is for Angry"	Dietrich Smith	Robert Yap	April 5, 2005	121A
Arthur joins an inter-scholastic checkers tournament, facing off against the Brain. However, Arthur's friends take the game too seriously, and he is ballistic with their unwanted support.
123a	8a	"The "A" Team"	Daisy Scott	Jeremy O'Neill & Robert Yap	April 6, 2005	125A
The Brain and Francine move into a more advanced soccer team, but are immediately overwhelmed by their new team's strict demands. They rejoin their old team after they learn their team is short two players.
123b	8b	"Emily Swallows a Horse"	Melissa Kirsch	Stèfanie Gignac	April 6, 2005	121B
D.W. finds a ball, drops it, and sees Emily holding it. Emily makes up an excuse to keep the ball, but starts telling bigger lies to cover up the first one, and D.W. eventually forgets why Emily started lying in the first place. Emily eventually decides to tell the truth and D.W. forgives her.
124a	9a	"D.W. Beats All"	Raye Lankford & Ken Scarborough	Jeremy O'Neill	April 7, 2005	124A
When the Tibbles get a set of drums and decide to perform for the Summer Serenade Festival, D.W. is jealous that she doesn't have an instrument of her own to play, and, with inspiration from Arthur, Buster, Francine, and Fern, she ultimately creates her own kinetic instrument.
124b	9b	"Buster the Myth Maker"	Matt Steinglass	Stéfanie Gignac	April 7, 2005	125B
Arthur and Buster go to investigate a rumor that tigers are loose in the park. This turns out to be an experiment by the Brain, who wanted to see if anyone would believe a seemingly true internet rumor with no leads. The Brain's story leads to Arthur and Buster solving a mystery about dogs disappearing from the park.
125a	10a	"Binky Goes Nuts"	Cusi Cram	Gerry Capelle	April 8, 2005	122A
Binky learns that he is not only bitten by a butterfly, but is also allergic to peanuts and is upset when he realizes he has to give up Chinese food, as it is cooked with peanut oil. Fortunately, with Jenna's advice, as she is allergic to milk, Binky discovers that there are many ways to cope with his allergy, and finds a peanut-free Chinese restaurant.
125b	10b	"Breezy Listening Blues"	Peter K. Kirsch	Jeremy O'Neill	April 8, 2005	122B
After scoring a B− on his test, the Brain thinks it may be caused by the Breezy Listening CD playing in his parents' local ice cream shop. Despite suggestions from his friends, he is unable to find music for the store that satisfies everyone. Soon after, the Brain gets a better grade on his next test, and accepts that the CD didn’t impact his performance.
