= Arthur season 19 =

Arthur
- Season 19
- No. of episodes: 10 (19 segments)

Release
- Original network: PBS Kids
- Original release: June 2, 2015 – May 26, 2016

Season chronology
- ← Previous; Season 18 Next → Season 20

The nineteenth season of the television series Arthur contains 10 episodes. These episodes were broadcast in early 2015 on CBBC in the UK, and aired on PBS Kids in the US from June 2, 2015 to May 26, 2016. This season was produced along with season 18 in 2013, and is the last season to be animated by 9 Story Media Group with Adobe Flash, starting next season, Oasis Animation takes over, flash-animating it with Toon Boom Harmony. This is also the last season where William Healy voices Arthur, Andrew Dayton voices D.W., and Jacob Ewaniuk and Jake Sim voices the Tibble Twins. Mr. Haney retires from his official role after "Mr. Ratburn's Secret Identity" due to Walter Massey's death in 2014 as his character's appearance will be reduced to a background cameo before his departure in season 20.

== Episodes ==
No. overall	No. in season	Title	Written by	Storyboard by	Original release date
216a	1a	"Brain's Brain"	Peter K. Hirsch	Rich Vanatte	January 18, 2016
D.W., the Brain, and Bud enter the Brain's brain to help him remember where he hid an Easter egg.
216b	1b	"Brain Sees Stars"	Matt Hoverman	Jeremy O'Neill	January 18, 2016
The Brain tries to see a meteor shower. Note: This episode is dedicated to Walter Massey, voice of Mr. Haney and Mr. Marco.
217a	2a	"Sue Ellen Adds It Up"	Cusi Cram & Peter K. Hirsch	Rich Vanatte	January 19, 2016
Sue Ellen wants to hang her art up by the school water fountain, until the fountain is relocated and she has to trim her drawing to match the new space.
217b	2b	"Wish You Were Here"	Dietrich Smith	Allan Jeffery	January 19, 2016
Sue Ellen meets her pen pal, who enjoys different things than she expected.
218a	3a	"Arthur's Toy Trouble"	Ken Scarborough	Allan Jeffery	January 20, 2016
Arthur is gifted a toy that is worth two million dollars, but he must compete with D.W. and Muffy before he can sell it.
218b	3b	"Spar for the Course"	David Steven Cohen & Raye Lankford	Jeremy O'Neill	January 20, 2016
After Binky wrecks the 18th hole at a miniature golf course, Muffy, Buster and Binky attempt to create a new 18th hole, but they cannot agree on a final design.
219a	4a	"Carried Away"	Matt Hoverman	Allan Jeffery	May 26, 2016
Pal's cousin, Dr. Yowl, takes Mei Lin, Kate, and Pal on a journey through the solar system.
219b	4b	"Dueling Detectives!"	Ken Scarborough	Jeremy O'Neill	May 26, 2016
When Wally, George's dummy puppet, goes missing, Fern and Binky war over who can find him.
220a	5a	"Buster Isn't Buying It"	Peter K. Hirsch	Jeremy O'Neill	June 2, 2015
After being tricked by a false news report, Buster chooses to believe nothing until it can be proven with concrete evidence.
220b	5b	"One Ornery Critter"	Dietrich Smith	Rick Marshall	June 2, 2015
Buster is tasked with taking care of his aunt's dog. Arthur tries to help take care of the dog, but it does not like him, and he tries to figure out why.
221a	6a	"Maria Speaks"	Vanessa Wiegel	Jeremy O'Neill	May 24, 2016
Maria, a silent girl in Mr. Ratburn's class, finally gets a chance to speak (despite having a stutter) when she is appointed a school news anchor.
221b	6b	"Postcards from Binky"	Ken Scarborough	Rick Marshall	May 24, 2016
Binky films a video re-enactment of his soccer game to send to his grandparents.
222a	7a	"Carl's Concerto"	Eric Shaw & Peter K. Hirsch	Gerry Capelle	April 5, 2016
After George discovers that Carl (from “When Carl Met George”) is a skilled accordionist, Carl agrees to play the accordion for George's puppet show reenactment of Goldilocks and the Three Bears.
222b	7b	"Too Much of a Good Thing"	Peter K. Hirsch	Rick Marshall	April 5, 2016
Buster enlists Binky's help to practice self-control and avoid eating his favorite cookies.
223a	8a	"Francine's Cleats of Strength"	Matt Hoverman	Gerry Capelle	June 3, 2015
Francine needs money to buy some new cleats, so she takes a job as Muffy's personal assistant.
223b	8b	"Little Miss Meanie"	Raye Lankford	Rick Marshall	June 3, 2015
Muffy and Lydia join forces to topple a snobbish and unpleasant beauty queen.
224a	9a	"Mr. Ratburn's Secret Identity"	Matt Hoverman	Allan Jeffery	May 25, 2016
Arthur, Buster, and Ladonna believe that Mr. Ratburn is a superhero.
224b	9b	"Besties"	Peter K. Hirsch	Gerry Capelle	May 25, 2016
Arthur is upset when he finds out that Ladonna replaces him as Buster's best friend.
225	10	"The Last Day"	Peter K. Hirsch	Jeremy O'Neill & Rick Marshall	May 23, 2016
It's the last day of the school year at Lakewood, and Arthur and co. are moving to the fourth grade, and D.W. and Bud are moving into kindergarten. As the summer season approaches, Muffy and Francine are concerned about attending different summer camps. Meanwhile, Arthur and Buster have their sights set on being in the grade four classroom taught by Mr. Cramp (B. J. Novak). However, Arthur and friends realize that MC is not original after all and that they learned a lot of things with Mr. Ratburn, so they write a duet and create a poster with all the stuff he taught them. They are delighted when they discover that Mr. Ratburn will be their fourth grade teacher. Note: This episode is dedicated to Greg Kramer, voice of Nemo.
