= Arthur season 8 =

Arthur
- Season 8
- No. of episodes: 10 (19 segments)

Release
- Original network: PBS Kids
- Original release: September 15 – December 26, 2003

Season chronology
- ← Previous; Season 7 Next → Season 9

The eighth season of the television series Arthur was originally broadcast on PBS Kids in the United States from September 15 to December 26, 2003, and contains 10 episodes. It is the last season featuring the voice talents of Mark Rendall, Patricia Rodriguez, and Aaron Grunfield as Arthur Read, Sue Ellen Armstrong, and Tommy Tibble, respectively. Additionally, Evan Smirnow, Alexina Cowan, and Sally Taylor-Isherwood each take over the roles of George Lundgren, Catherine Frensky, and Emily Leduc from Mitchell Rothpan, Patricia Rodriguez, and Vanessa Lengies. It is also the final season before CINAR, the original production company behind Arthur, underwent a rebranding to become Cookie Jar Entertainment in the following year.

== Production ==
In a February 2022 interview with Variety, Marc Brown stated that the inspiration for the episode "Bleep" came from a young neighbor of his, who learned a swear word on the school bus.

== Episodes ==
No. overall	No. in season	Title	Written by	Storyboard by	Original release date	Prod. code
106a	1a	"Dear Adil"	Peter K. Hirsch	Ivan Tankushev	September 15, 2003	106B
Arthur becomes pen pals with a Turkish boy named Adil Akyuz, but he confuses him with his incorrect knowledge of Turkey, which he got from a comic book he read. When Alberto explains to Arthur that everything in the comic is inaccurate, Arthur apologizes to Adil and they both realize they actually have a lot in common.
106b	1b	"Bitzi's Break Up"	Peter K. Hirsch	Jeremy O'Neill	September 15, 2003	110A
Bitzi announces to Buster that she is breaking up with Harry (from "Bitzi's Beau") and Buster, thinking he will never get to spend time with Harry again, is devastated, so he creates a plan to reunite them, but it backfires. After Bitzi explains he can still be friends with Harry, Buster feels better.
107a	2a	"Fernfern and the Secret of Moose Mountain"	Stephanie Simpson	Ivan Tankushev	September 16, 2003	108B
When Oliver takes Francine, Fern, Muffy, Prunella, and Jenna on a trip to Moose Mountain, Francine is determined to beat her record of three hours to the top, but she is furious when she has to be paired with Fern, who has no experience with mountain-climbing. Disaster strikes when Francine's impatience leads to her losing the map and Fern getting stuck in a muddy bog. As Francine manages to beat her record, Oliver is mad at her for acting inconsiderate towards Fern.
107b	2b	"Thanks a Lot, Binky"	Peter Egan	Julian Harris	September 16, 2003	107A
Binky saves Rattles from getting injured in a dangerous stunt, but Rattles is ungrateful and declines thanking Binky. Soon after, Binky tries doing good deeds to get someone to thank him, but nobody does and he is upset. That night, he dreams what the world would be like if he was not kind.
108a	3a	"Arthur's Snow Biz"	Jonathan Greenberg	Jeremy O'Neill	September 17, 2003	106A
Arthur and Buster start a snow-shoveling business, but an argument over splitting the money leads to them separating and competing for customers. After working hard for ridiculously low fees and getting blisters, they give Muffy their jobs and reconcile.
108b	3b	"Bugged"	Jonathan Greenberg	Robert Yap	September 17, 2003	109A
The Brain annoys his friends by constantly correcting them, and they call him a pest. After he has a dream where he becomes a bug to see how his friends really see him, he decides to never help them again, but soon learns that it might not be the best solution to his problem.
109a	4a	"Fernkenstein's Monster"	Stephanie Simpson	Ivan Tankushev & Patricia Atchinson	September 18, 2003	110B
Fern tells Arthur, Buster, and Muffy a scary story, but they find it disturbing. Nobody wants to be near Fern because of her story, so she tries creating one that is fun instead of frightening.
109b	4b	"D.W., Dancing Queen"	Glen Berger	Robert Yap	September 18, 2003	107B
Mr. Ratburn's class is doing projects with the preschoolers, and D.W. and Binky are made partners. They decide to do a dance for their project, but teaching D.W. how to dance proves to be a handful for Binky. Things get worse when Molly and Rattles tease him and he injures his ankle. However, D.W. dances successfully in front of everyone, much to Binky's delight.
110a	5a	"Vomitrocious"	Dietrich Smith	Julian Harris & Patricia Atchinson	September 19, 2003	111A
When Arthur’s friends tease George with his constant nosebleeds, a sick Francine vomits in front of everyone being grossed out, and is upset that she will be teased as well, so she constantly avoids them. But for a while, Francine then continues to nauseate until she stands up for George when he tells her everyone teases him but not her since she is popular.
110b	5b	"Sue Ellen Chickens Out"	Peter Egan & Peter K. Hirsch	Robert Yap	September 19, 2003	111B
Mr. Manino, the Sugar Bowl manager, announces that he is retiring and plans to sell the shop to a fast-food chain. Sue Ellen is let down by this change and starts a rally for her friends to go on strike and save the Sugar Bowl, but it backfires when everyone except her cannot stay on track. In the end, after recalling the good times he had at the Sugar Bowl with Grandma Thora, Mr. Manino changes his mind and decides to keep the shop open, much to Sue Ellen's delight.
111	6	"Postcards from Buster"	Peter K. Hirsch	Jeremy O'Neill	December 22, 2003	112A 113B
Buster and the Reads travel to New York City to visit Buster's father. Throughout a majority of the episode, while Buster is using his new video camera, everything seen on the camera is live-action footage, instead of the usual animation. Note 1: Buster's father's face finally reveals itself in this episode. Note 2: This episode serves as the backdoor-pilot episode for the Arthur spin-off series Postcards from Buster.
112a	7a	"Desk Wars"	Glen Berger	Gerry Capelle	December 23, 2003	112B
On a hot day, Arthur's friends fight over who gets to sit by the fan, which leads to the entire class threatening to destroy each other's possessions, and as the situation soon escalates into a complete battle, Mr. Haney puts a stop to the fight before it goes too far.
112b	7b	"Desperately Seeking Stanley"	Cusi Cram	Julian Harris & Patricia Atchinson	December 23, 2003	109B
Arthur sells his old and torn teddy bear, Stanley, to Vicita at a garage sale. He later regrets his decision and tries to get Stanley back.
113a	8a	"Muffy's Art Attack"	Stephanie Simpson	Jeremy O'Neill	December 24, 2003	114A
After attending an art show with Ed and Prunella, Muffy tries to build kinetic sculptures but she cannot come up with any good ideas. Her butler, Bailey, builds some well-done sculptures, and during a showcase, Muffy tries to pass them off as her own. Guest star: Arthur Ganson as himself.
113b	8b	"Tales from the Crib"	Jonathan Greenberg	Robert Yap & Julian Harris	December 24, 2003	113A
Vicita is let down when she has to give up her crib, so D.W. tells her how she grew out of her crib and gave it to Kate.
114a	9a	"Flea to Be You and Me"	Story by : Cusi Cram; Written by : Jonathan Greenberg	Gerry Capelle	December 25, 2003	114B
An Italian flea named Pepe tells Kate, Pal, and Amigo the story of his journey around the world, and how he became separated from his brother, Sale.
114b	9b	"Kiss and Tell"	Jacqui Deegan	Jeremy O'Neill & Julian Harris	December 25, 2003	115A
Emily tells D.W. how she felt when a boy kissed her on vacation, and D.W. begins to wonder what it feels like. She starts contemplating on asking James to kiss her.
115a	10a	"Big Horns George"	Peter K. Hirsch	Gerry Capelle & Robert Yap	December 26, 2003	115B
George learns how to sing the blues, with inspiration from his giraffe dummy, Wally (from "Arthur's Dummy Disaster") and the Brain's CDs. Guest stars: Koko Taylor and Taj Mahal as themselves.
115b	10b	"Bleep"	Dietrich Smith	Jeremy O'Neill	December 26, 2003	108A
While on a shopping trip to a jewelry store with Grandma Thora, D.W. overhears a teenager curse at his mother after banning him from a concert, causing her to drop a glass and break it to smithereens. D.W. wants to know the meaning of the word, but she is afraid that if she says it, the same thing will happen to the other Reads. She then tests this on Vicita, only to get in trouble, and Mrs. Read is furious. While she ungrounds D.W. because she didn't know what the word meant, D.W. learns that swearing is inappropriate, especially for 3-year-old kids in preschool and 4-year-old kids in pre-kindergarten. After Mrs. Read simply tells her that people get offended by such words and that they can mean "I want to hurt your feelings", D.W. decides to have a talk with her friends the next day about swearing.
