= Tony Mendoza =

Tony Mendoza may refer to:

- Tony Mendoza (politician), California state legislator
- Tony Mendoza (photographer), Cuban-American photographer
- Tony Mendoza (artist), Miami-based, Cuban-American artist
