= Marc Brown Studios =

Television production company

- Founded: 2000; 26 years ago
- Founder: Marc Brown
- Headquarters: New York City, New York

Marc Brown Studios is a TV production company. Marc Brown Studios was formed by Marc Brown, the writer of the original Arthur book series that inspired the hit cartoon series, Arthur. The Christmas special, Arthur's Perfect Christmas, is the first production credited under Marc Brown Studios in 2000.

Starting in July 2003, Marc Brown Studios began producing Postcards from Buster, a spinoff to Arthur.

== Company ==
Marc Brown Studios is the formal creative, corporate and production entity of children's book author and illustrator, Marc Brown. Formed a few years after the launch of the Arthur television series on PBS, Marc Brown Studios was created to manage the rapidly expanding international licensing and publishing program associated with the show. Brown's oldest son, Tolon Brown, is also a member of the company and contributes to management of the licensing program as well as overseeing the production and development of on-screen media.

Marc Brown Studios also worked on Hop, a preschool animated series which premiered April 4, 2024, on HBO Max and Cartoonito. It also appeared on CBC Kids and Discovery Kids.
