= Bleep =

Bleep may refer to:

- Bleep sound, a noise, generally of a single tone, often generated by a machine
  - Bleep censor, the replacement of offensive language (swear words) or personal details with a beep sound
  - Bleep techno, a Yorkshire-born subgenre of techno music, that was popular in the early 1990s
- Bleep (store), an online music store established by Warp Records
- A term for a pager, especially in medical institutions
- Colonel Bleep, the first colour cartoon ever made for television
- Bleep, a fictional character in the Josie and the Pussycats cartoon
- "Bleep", a season 8 episode of Arthur
- "Bleep", a song by Stray Kids from their studio album Karma (2025)

== See also ==
- What the Bleep Do We Know!?, a 2004 film
- Bleep My Dad Says, a television sitcom
