= Arthur season 17 =

Arthur
- Season 17
- No. of episodes: 10 (20 segments)

Release
- Original network: PBS Kids
- Original release: November 11, 2013 – May 14, 2014

Season chronology
- ← Previous; Season 16 Next → Season 18

The seventeenth season of the television series Arthur was originally broadcast on PBS Kids in the United States from November 11, 2013, to May 13, 2014. This season was the second produced by 9 Story Media Group. This is the last season in which Drew Adkins, Jake Beale and Siam Yu voice Arthur, D.W. and The Brain. In the next season, Adkins is replaced by William Healy as Arthur, Beale is replaced by Andrew Dayton as D.W. and Yu is replaced by Max Friedman Cole as The Brain. This is also the first season to air on the revamped PBS Kids brand.

== Episodes ==
No. overall	No. in season	Title	Written by	Storyboard by	Original release date
196a	1a	"Show Off"	Peter K. Hirsch	Ken Cunningham	November 11, 2013
Killer participates in a dog show to put Sebastian Winkleplotz (Alan Cumming), the snobby champion, in his place.
196b	1b	"Dog's Best Friend"	Jacqui Deegan & Peter K. Hirsch	Allan Jeffery	November 11, 2013
When Arthur takes care of Amigo while Alberto is at camp, Pal is upset that he has been replaced.
197a	2a	"Adventures in Budylon"	Craig Carlisle	Cilbur Rocha	November 12, 2013
D.W. and Bud camp in the backyard, while Arthur and Ladonna build a diorama about Annie Smith Peck.
197b	2b	"Ladonna Compson: Party Animal"	Marin Gazzaniga	Daniel Miodini	November 12, 2013
Ladonna attempts to do many activities at once during her first fall in Elwood City, but is unable to keep up with all the events.
198a	3a	"Molina's Mulligan"	Matt Hoverman	Cilbur Rocha	November 13, 2013
Alberto starts playing golf, while his overenthusiastic father embarrasses him during his games.
198b	3b	"Buster Bombs"	Ken Pontac	Ken Cunningham	November 13, 2013
Buster's jokes are now unable to make anyone laugh, so he tries to be as funny as possible.
199a	4a	"Opposites Distract"	Matt Hoverman	Gerry Capelle	November 14, 2013
When Arthur's room gets a leaky roof, he is forced to study in Buster's condo for a while. Buster is annoyed by Arthur's neat tendencies, while Arthur finds it hard to study in Buster's messy room.
199b	4b	"Just the Ticket"	Dietrich Smith	Ken Cunningham	November 14, 2013
Arthur wins two tickets to a concert, which his friends compete for.
200a	5a	"All Thumbs"	Dietrich Smith	Gerry Capelle	November 15, 2013
Arthur catches Buster sucking his thumb, and begins avoiding him while not telling anyone about Buster's secret.
200b	5b	"Kidonia"	Tolon Brown & Peter K. Hirsch	Ken Cunningham	November 15, 2013
Arthur and his friends start their own country to get out of homework and chores, but they realize that a world with no rules is not as good as it seems.
201a	6a	"Speak Up, Francine!"	Jonathan Greenberg	Allan Jeffery	April 21, 2014
Francine wants to speak about pollution, but she must overcome her problems with public speaking to crowds first.
201b	6b	"Waiting for Snow"	Scott Gray	Cilbur Rocha	April 21, 2014
Ladonna can’t wait to see her first blizzard: Skiing, sledding, and other snow activities. If only the weather could cooperate. Can Arthur and Buster help make Ladonna’s winter dreams a reality, or will she be upset?
202a	7a	"Pets and Pests"	Peter K. Hirsch	Allan Jeffery	April 22, 2014
The Reads are shocked when an unwanted mouse has taken over their house and D.W. wants it gone forever! When traps don’t work, Arthur enlists help of an expert exterminator and a fearless hunter who laughs in the face of danger: Nemo.
202b	7b	"Go Fly a Kite"	Peter K. Hirsch	Cilbur Rocha	April 22, 2014
Muffy, Binky, and Ladonna find a lost kite and argue over who gets to keep it.
203a	8a	"The Director's Cut"	Elliott Thomson & Peter K. Hirsch	Robert Yap	May 12, 2014
George is inspired to make a movie, but his friends refuse to cooperate.
203b	8b	"Crime and Consequences"	Peter K. Hirsch	Gerry Capelle	May 12, 2014
When George accidentally breaks the class's prize wood project, Binky gets unfairly blamed.
204a	9a	"Caught in the Crosswires"	Scott Gray	Allan Jeffery	May 13, 2014
Muffy's family is chosen to star in a reality show, but the producers order Muffy to be mean to Bailey.
204b	9b	"Framed!"	Kathy Waugh	Cilbur Rocha	May 13, 2014
Muffy hires Buster to paint a portrait of her, but she is not pleased when he paints her as an alien.
205a	10a	"Binky's Music Madness"	David Steven Cohen	Ken Cunningham	May 14, 2014
The Bang on a Can All-Stars visit Elwood City, and everyone loves their music, except Binky.
205b	10b	"Brain Freeze"	Andy Yerkes & Peter K. Hirsch	Gerry Capelle	May 14, 2014
When a new ice cream shop, Yumbobo, opens up next to the Brain's, he is hopeless, so he must come up with a gimmick to win back customers.
