= Arthur season 20 =

Arthur
- Season 20
- No. of episodes: 7 (14 segments)

Release
- Original network: PBS Kids
- Original release: October 10, 2016 – June 1, 2017

Season chronology
- ← Previous; Season 19 Next → Season 21

The twentieth season of Arthur began broadcast on PBS Kids in the United States on October 10, 2016, and finished on June 1, 2017. In this season, Oasis Animation took over animation from 9 Story Media Group.

Christian Distefano takes over the voice for D.W., replacing Andrew Dayton. Distefano previously voiced James in Seasons 18 and 19. Jacob Ursomarzo replaced William Healy as Arthur, and Samuel Faraci and Devan Cohen replaced Jacob Ewaniuk and Jake Sim as Timmy and Tommy Tibble.

== Episodes ==
No. overall	No. in season	Title	Written by	Storyboard by	Original release date
226a	1a	"Buster's Second Chance"	Ken Scarborough	Cilbur Rocha	October 10, 2016
Buster has a dream about what his life would be like if he was a genius.
226b	1b	"Arthur and the Whole Truth"	Peter K. Hirsch	Jeremy O'Neill	October 10, 2016
Arthur thinks that Buster has been lying to him to avoid hurting his feelings.
227a	2a	"Fern's Flights of Fancy"	Peter K. Hirsch	Gerry Capelle	October 11, 2016
Fern writes a story for a writing contest, but ends up losing. She gives up on writing and pursues soccer as an interest.
227b	2b	"Cereal"	John Yearly	Cilbur Rocha	October 11, 2016
After a box of D.W.'s favorite cereal goes missing, Buster makes a podcast about the scenario.
228a	3a	"He Said, He Said"	Cheri Magid	Sylvain Lavoie	October 12, 2016
Arthur, Buster, Carl, and George are excited to watch a Bionic Bunny special, but the cable goes out. Meanwhile, D.W. and Bud play Tower of Cows, and Carl joins in.
228b	3b	"Bunny Trouble"	Kathy Waugh	Jeremy O'Neill	October 12, 2016
D.W. is allowed to take home her preschool class's pet bunny, who runs away. D.W. must find the bunny before returning to school, and borrows Ladonna’s help.
229a	4a	"Bud's Knotty Problem"	Raye Lankford	Cilbur Rocha	October 13, 2016
Bud learns to tie his shoes after seeing a pair of boots that he wants.
229b	4b	"That's MY Grandma!"	Cliff Ruby & Elana Lesser	Gerry Capelle	October 13, 2016
D.W. is upset when Grandma Thora becomes Elwood City’s most popular babysitter.
230a	5a	"Lend Me Your Ear"	Raye Lankford & Peter K. Hirsch	Allan Jeffery	May 30, 2017
Mr. Ratburn begins to ignore his students, much to Arthur, Buster, and the Brain's concern. He later reveals that this is due to his noise-induced hearing loss, as he plays in a band.
230b	5b	"The Butler Did It"	Peter K. Hirsch	Gerry Capelle	May 30, 2017
Ed gets a robot butler, but Muffy fears that it may replace Bailey.
231a	6a	"Prunella's Tent of Portent"	Jessica Carleton	Jeremy O'Neill	May 31, 2017
After Marina doubts Prunella's fortune-telling abilities, they makes a bet that Prunella's three predictions will come true by the end of the day.
231b	6b	"Mutiny on the Pitch"	Cliff Ruby & Elana Lesser	Cilbur Rocha	May 31, 2017
Francine leaves her soccer position to Buster when the Lakewood Elementary soccer team claims she is too bossy.
232a	7a	"The Hallway Minotaur"	Matt Hoverman	Gerry Capelle	June 1, 2017
George becomes Lakewood Elementary's hallway monitor.
232b	7b	"Ladonna's Like List"	Jessica Carleton	Allan Jeffrey	June 1, 2017
Ladonna makes a list to see how many people like her.
