= Arthur season 7 =

Arthur
- Season 7
- No. of episodes: 10 (18 segments)

Release
- Original network: PBS
- Original release: October 8 – November 29, 2002

Season chronology
- ← Previous; Season 6 Next → Season 8

The seventh season of the television series Arthur was originally broadcast on PBS in the United States from October 8 to November 29, 2002, and contains 10 episodes.

The special "Arthur, It's Only Rock 'N' Roll" served as the premiere of this season. It is the first season to feature Mark Rendall, Jason Szwimer, Katie Hood, and Aaron Grunfield as the voices of Arthur Read, D.W. Read, Alan "The Brain" Powers, and Tommy Tibble, replacing Justin Bradley, Oliver Grainger, Steven Crowder, and Jonathan Koensgen, respectively. It is also the final season to feature Mitchell Rothpan and Patricia Rodriguez as the voices of George Lundgren and Catherine Frensky.

The series won a Daytime Emmy in 2003 for Outstanding Sound Mixing - Live Action and Animation.

== Episodes ==
No. overall	No. in season	Title	Written by	Storyboard by	Original release date	Prod. code
96a	1a	"Cast Away"	Dietrich Smith	Gerry Capelle	October 8, 2002	97B
Arthur is depressed when things don't go the way he wants them to be. He wants to have a weekend fishing alone with Mr. Read, being away from D.W., but a change of plans for the following weekend forces them to bring her along. He then gets jealous of her when she catches more fish than him by using an unusual technique she came up with herself.
96b	1b	"The Great Sock Mystery"	Peter K. Hirsch	Stefanie Gignac	October 8, 2002	98B
One of D.W.'s socks goes missing, so Pal and Kate try to find it. The thief is revealed to be the Molinas' dog, Amigo, who tells them about the Sock Market, a parody of the stock market, and Pal tries to auction off socks from the house to get D.W.'s back.
97a	2a	"Francine's Split Decision"	Peter Egan	Stefanie Gignac	October 9, 2002	96B
Francine's bowling tournament and her cousin's bar mitzvah are at the same time, so her friends devise a plan allowing her to attend both events at once. However, Francine's friends forget some parts of the plan, and her parents eventually figure out what is going on. As punishment for missing half of the party, Francine is given extra chores.
97b	2b	"Muffy Goes Metropolitan"	Matthew Lane	Jeremy O'Neill	October 9, 2002	97A
Sue Ellen invites Muffy to spend the weekend with her in Crown City, a nearby metropolis, which Muffy thinks is a glamorous world of class, fashion, shopping, and high culture. However, her first trip is nothing like she imagined it would be as they go to an Ethiopian restaurant and listen to a poetry slam.
98a	3a	"Ants in Arthur's Pants"	Glen Berger	Robert Yap	October 10, 2002	96A
For an extra credit science project, Arthur builds a formicarium for ants, but all the ants spill out of the formicarium and he must find a way to attract them back in. When Arthur accidentally destroys Francine's project while trying to catch the ants, they get a new idea and team up to work on the project together.
98b	3b	"Don't Ask Muffy"	Cusi Cram	Gerry Capelle	October 10, 2002	100A
Muffy starts an advice column, but one of the Tough Customers, Molly MacDonald, turns out to be a better advice giver. Muffy tries to improve her column by copying Molly's appearance and interests.
99a	4a	"To Tibble the Truth"	Gerard Lewis & Peter K. Hirsch	Robert Yap	October 11, 2002	98A
After causing two incidents involving lying to Alberto, the Tibbles fear they may end up in prison for lying. They swear to always tell the truth, but end up offending their friends and acquaintances. Alberto advises the twins not to say the first thing that comes to their minds and explains how they can be honest and nice at the same time.
99b	4b	"Waiting to Go"	Glen Berger	Robert Yap	October 11, 2002	100B
After Binky accidentally breaks the Brain's new watch during a soccer game, they fight with each other while waiting for their parents (who are late) to pick them up.
100	5	"Elwood City Turns 100!"	Peter K. Hirsch & Matthew Lane	Jeremy O'Neill & Robert Yap	October 14, 2002	101A 102A
To celebrate Elwood City's 100th anniversary, Mr. Ratburn's class is chosen to stage a musical based on the birth of the city. However, many arguments arise over which direction the play should take, and things eventually escalate into chaos. The play is a fiasco until Arthur willingly trades roles with Francine before the final act, and the show turns to be big success.
101a	6a	"Pick a Car, Any Car"	Peter Egan	Jeremy O'Neill	November 25, 2002	99B
The Reads' car makes funny noises, but they can't figure out what is wrong with it. To make matters worse, they can't afford to repair or replace it. Fortunately, with the help of Buster and the Car Talk guys, Arthur figures out that Kate's rattle is stuck in the exhaust pipe. Guest stars: Tom and Ray Magliozzi (the Car Talk guys) as Click and Clack Tappet.
101b	6b	"Jenna's Bedtime Blues"	Glen Berger	Jean Saro & Sylvie Lafrance	November 25, 2002	103A
Jenna Morgan is invited to Muffy's annual slumber party, but she is worried that she will be teased since she still wets the bed and has to wear a pull-up. So Jenna tries to hide her secret, but when her pull-up is exposed, Francine tells her that it is nothing to be embarrassed about as she used to have the same problem as Jenna.
102a	7a	"D.W.'s Time Trouble"	Dietrich Smith	Gerry Capelle	November 26, 2002	102B
After being forced to watch a movie with Arthur and his friends, D.W. wishes she was older than Arthur. She has a dream where she and Nadine alter the timeline so that she is bought first at the baby store before Arthur. After a time travel mishap, she realizes how much she appreciates having an older sibling.
102b	7b	"Buster's Amish Mismatch"	Peter Egan	Jean Saro & Sylvie Lafrance	November 26, 2002	101B
After a field trip to an Amish family farm, Buster changes his lifestyle to one of the Amish, but finds the adjustment very hard to do. After learning from Mrs. MacGrady that what he is doing is not fully Amish, since he is feeling lonely and miserable, Buster decides to return to his normal lifestyle.
103a	8a	"The World of Tomorrow"	Peter Egan	Robert Yap	November 27, 2002	104A
During a sleepover at the science museum with Mr. Ratburn's class, Binky is bored until he sees a new unopened exhibit about the future. Interested, he sneaks into the exhibit, only to be trapped inside. He has a dream where he is in the future with robot look-alikes of his friends.
103b	8b	"Is There a Doctor in the House?"	Nick Raposo	Gerry Capelle	November 27, 2002	99A
Arthur and D.W. try to help out around the house when Mr. and Mrs. Read have colds, but they end up making things worse. So they try to fix their mistakes, fearing that they will have to learn to take care of things if Mr. and Mrs. Read remain ill. Their worries are cured when Grandma Thora arrives to help out.
104a	9a	"Prunella Sees the Light"	Peter K. Hirsch	Jeremy O'Neill	November 28, 2002	103B
Prunella invites Marina over for a sleepover. However, she is worried that Marina may get injured because she is blind. Marina dislikes the special treatment Prunella is giving her, and Prunella learns to treat Marina just like any other friend.
104b	9b	"Return of the Snowball"	Dietrich Smith	Gerry Capelle	November 28, 2002	104B
D.W. is surprised when she thinks that her snowball has returned (from "D.W.'s Snow Mystery") and tries to prevent it from being stolen again. After an investigation by the Brain, Arthur confesses that the snowball is actually an unflavored snow cone and that the real snowball is still lost, and that he got the fake snowball hoping D.W would end being bothered by the real one missing.
105	10	"April 9th"	Peter K. Hirsch	Gerry Capelle & Jeremy O'Neill	November 29, 2002	105
A fire strikes in Lakewood Elementary, so Arthur and his friends have to attend school at Mighty Mountain, their biggest rival. The fire affects everyone in various ways: Sue Ellen is upset when her diary is inadvertently burned, and Muffy isn’t understandable how important it is to Sue Ellen, and when Mr. Read barely makes it out of the fire, Arthur fears that something could happen to him again. Binky gets traumatized after witnessing the fire and pulls the alarm himself. Mr. Morris, the school janitor, injures his leg during the fire. Buster was absent when the fire occurred and is unable to relate to the others. Buster becomes friends with Mr. Morris until he chooses to retire to New Mexico. Binky overcomes his trauma with help from Oliver, who's a former firefighter. Arthur's fears ease when Mr. Read admits that he had a similar fear for Grandma Thora, when he was younger, and shows him how to handle it. Muffy gives Sue Ellen a new diary, along with a picture from the original diary that inspires Sue Ellen to move forward. Francine writes each of the inspiring stories in a school newspaper, and it is presented to everyone when the school reopens.
