= Alan Catello Grazioso =

- Grazioso in Hong Kong in 2015
- Born: Alan Catello Grazioso; New Haven, Connecticut, U.S.
- Education: Northeastern University, Notre Dame High School (West Haven, Connecticut)
- Occupations: Filmmaker, producer
- Years active: 1989–present
- Spouse: Patricia Alvarado Nuñez (m. 1999)
- Website: www.alan-grazioso.com

Alan Catello Grazioso is an American filmmaker and online content creator known for his work in children's educational programming, higher education, and online programming. Grazioso created original content for three Emmy Award recognized PBS Kids television series including Zoom, Fetch! with Ruff Ruffman and Postcards from Buster, which he and his partner Patricia Alvarado Núñez were nominated for a 2008 Daytime Emmy Award for Outstanding Children Series. Grazioso's online video credits include "Lives on the Line: The Human Cost of Chicken", a web-based interactive project funded and published by Oxfam America which received a 2016 Webby Award Honoree achievement. In 2016, The Washington Post featured a two-minute online short film produced by Grazioso for Oxfam’s 'Lives on the Line' campaign, and AJ+ ran a one-minute version on its social which garnered over six million views across digital platforms and was widely shared on social media, sparking discussions on labor rights and workplace conditions in the poultry industry.

Grazioso graduated from Northeastern University in Boston, and during his sophomore year he took a full-time six-month "co-op" position at NPR in Washington, DC and worked closely with Liane Hansen as well as interacted with Susan Stamberg, Martin Goldsmith (radio host), Noah Adams and other NPR on-air personalities. In 2017, he oversaw production of a series of video assets for Harvard Business Publishing (HBP) ManageMentor, a subscriber-based online learning platform for global Fortune 500 companies, then while at Harvard Business School (HBS) Grazioso worked on multimedia content for curriculum development and faculty projects. The 'HBS Staff Stories' podcast was developed as part of a collaboration between the HBS Dean's Office and a group of HBS staffers, which included Grazioso. Grazioso currently is the executive producer of multimedia on the Communications team at Harvard Radcliffe Institute (HRI), which is part of Harvard University. In April 2022, the HRI Communications group led the digital launch of the Harvard & Legacy of Slavery website, which was anchored at Harvard Radcliffe Institute and included a report, film, articles, and a mobile-based app tour. The Harvard & Legacy of Slavery project included a mobile-based tour, with Grazioso as the executive producer. In 2023, the Harvard Radcliffe Institute received three Webby Awards nominations in the categories of websites and mobile sites, video, apps and software, for the 'Harvard & Legacy of Slavery' project, Grazioso oversaw the multimedia elements of the nominated products., and his video work featuring Radcliffe Fellow Isabel Galleymore was spotlighted on the landing page of Harvard.edu, the main website of Harvard University during Climate Change Action Week. In September 2023, Grazioso oversaw the launch of Radcliffe’s first-ever podcast series, BornCurious, where he serves as executive producer and occasional guest host. In 2024, HRI launched a new multimedia exhibit in Radcliffe Yard and online entitled "Radcliffe Moments," which included nine kiosks of full size head-to-toe portraits, photographed in three countries, of Radcliffe-connected fellows, students, and scholars, and included photography, audio, and video elements produced by Grazioso. During the summer of 2025, Grazioso cofounded a social good brand with his life partner Patricia Alvarado as a passion project turned into a mission to remove plastics and debris from the ocean, this idea began when they helped rescue a mother humpback whale named Pinball and her eight month old calf off the coast of Rockport, Massachusetts.

== Personal life ==
Grazioso grew up in New Haven, Connecticut. His father, Cal Grazioso, was a union crane operator with Local 478 in Connecticut. His mother, Dee Grazioso, was an administrator for the Yale School of Medicine for over 25 years. He attended Notre Dame High School where he played varsity baseball, served as class treasurer and yearbook photographer before graduating in 1987.

== Published Work - Educational ==
Grazioso additional credits include as a video editor of the video companion of a 2008 Thompson Learning textbook, as well as producer of the "Resources for Early Learners" public online site created by the WGBH Educational Foundation.

== Awards and nominations ==
Projects on which Grazioso worked have received the following awards and nominations:

Year	Award	Work	Result	Category
2003	Daytime Emmy Award	ZOOM – PBS Kids	Nominated	Outstanding Children's Series
2004	Daytime Emmy Award	ZOOM – PBS Kids	Nominated	Outstanding Children's Series
2005	Daytime Emmy Award	ZOOM – PBS Kids	Nominated	Outstanding Children's Series
2006	Daytime Emmy Award	ZOOM – PBS Kids	Won	Outstanding Children's Series
2008	Parents' Choice Award	Postcards from Buster – PBS Kids	Won	Parents' Choice Award
2008	Daytime Emmy Award	Postcards from Buster – PBS Kids	Nominated	Outstanding Children's Series
2009	Daytime Emmy Award	FETCH! with Ruff Ruffman – PBS Kids	Nominated	Outstanding Children's Series
2011	Hatch Award	Shawn & Quantel – Mass Mentoring	Won	Online video
2016	Webby Award	Lives on the Line: The Human Cost of Chicken – Oxfam America	Honoree	Websites: Activism
2021	Telly Award	Peak Investment Capital: Changing the Narrative of West Africa – Harvard Business School	Silver Winner	Non-Broadcast: General – Education
2023	Webby Award	Harvard & the Legacy of Slavery: Film – Harvard Radcliffe Institute	Honoree	Video: Public Service & Activism
2023	Webby Award	Harvard & the Legacy of Slavery Tour Experience – Harvard Radcliffe Institute	Nominated	Apps, dApps and Software: Public Service & Activism
2023	Webby Award	Harvard & the Legacy of Slavery – Harvard Radcliffe Institute	Nominated	Websites and Mobile Sites: Best Individual Editorial Feature – Ind/Brand/Org
2023	Webby Award	Harvard & the Legacy of Slavery – Harvard Radcliffe Institute	Nominated	Websites and Mobile Sites: School/University

== Selected filmography & podcast credits ==
=== Podcast Executive Producer & Co-host ===
- (cohost) Kindness—It’s Good for You! – BornCurious (podcast), Harvard Radcliffe Institute
- (host) Gifts of Intergenerational Friendship – BornCurious (podcast), Harvard Radcliffe Institute
- (cohost) Music and Chaos – BornCurious (podcast), Harvard Radcliffe Institute
- (executive producer) BornCurious (podcast) 40 episodes, Harvard Radcliffe Institute

=== Field Producer (television) ===
- Postcards from Buster – PBS Kids (1 episode)
- Fetch with Ruff Ruffman PBS Kids (9 segments, 1 full episode)

=== Field Producer/Editor(television) ===
- ZOOM – PBS Kids (11 segments)

=== Executive Producer/Director ===
- What's Your 20? – Travel Channel (pilot)
- Reunite Road Trip – Travel Channel (pilot)

=== Line Producer ===
- Journey to 10,000 BC – History Channel (90 minute primetime special)
