= Arthur season 21 =

Arthur
- Season 21
- No. of episodes: 7 (13 segments)

Release
- Original network: PBS Kids
- Original release: October 24, 2017 – February 15, 2018

Season chronology
- ← Previous; Season 20 Next → Season 22

The twenty-first season of Arthur aired on PBS Kids in the U.S. from October 24, 2017 to February 15, 2018. John Lewis guest starred in the episode "Arthur Takes a Stand". This is also the last season where Jacob Ursomarzo voices Arthur, Christian Distefano voices D.W. and Max Friedman Cole voices Brain.

== Episodes ==
No. overall	No. in season	Title	Written by	Storyboard by	Original release date
233a	1a	"Binky's 'A' Game"	Peter K. Hirsch	Michel Carbonneau	October 24, 2017
Muffy and Francine think Binky cheated on a test when he gets an A.
233b	1b	"Brain and the Time Capsule"	Cliff Ruby & Elana Lesser	Jean Banville	October 24, 2017
The Brain makes a time capsule, but soon gets frustrated when everyone wants to donate their objects.
234	2	"The Master Builders"	Peter K. Hirsch	Gerry Capelle and Michel Carbonneau	October 24, 2017
Buster and Fritz try building a birdhouse for the community garden, while Muffy and Francine work together to create cat toys.
235a	3a	"Francine & the Soccer Spy"	Vanessa Wiegel	Bernie Denk and Allan Jeffery	October 26, 2017
Ladonna befriends a member of the Mighty Mountain soccer team, and Francine is suspicious of Ladonna sharing the Lakewood team's secret plans.
235b	3b	"Sue Ellen & the Last Page"	Belinda Arredondo	Dev Ramsaran and Allan Jeffery	October 26, 2017
Sue Ellen tries to save the library after the city council votes to close it permanently.
236a	4a	"Muffy Misses Out"	Matt Hoverman	Allan Jeffery	February 12, 2018
Muffy takes a trip to Italy, but worries about her position in charge of Mrs. MacGrady's bake sale. When the bake sale is a success, Muffy thinks that her friends do not need her anymore.
236b	4b	"Arthur Takes a Stand" (Note: From this episode, these titles and other episode info are taken from the opening credits and the closing credits of each episode.)	Peter K. Hirsch	Cilbur Rocha	February 12, 2018
Arthur discovers that Mrs. MacGrady manages the cafeteria without any help, which he does not find fair. With the help of John Lewis, Arthur is able to convince the school board to hire an assistant for her.
237a	5a	"Slink's Special Talent"	Peter K. Hirsch	Cilbur Rocha	February 13, 2018
Slink doubts that he has a special talent. With Rattles’s help, he finds out that he is great at newspaper delivery.
237b	5b	"Take a Hike, Molly"	Cheri Magid	Nick Vallinakis	February 13, 2018
The Tough Customers force Molly to go on a hiking trail and she keeps disagreeing. So they film a documentary.
238a	6a	"The Lost Dinosaur"	Jessica Carleton	Cilbur Rocha	February 14, 2018
Bud loses his toy dinosaur and his imaginary friend, Rapty.
238b	6b	"The Princess Problem"	Matt Hoverman	Jean Banville, James Clayton Bourne, and Daniel Miodini	February 14, 2018
D.W. and Emily learn that Lydia (from “The Wheel Deal”) their substitute basketball teacher, hates princesses because they are all "perfect."
239a	7a	"Invasion of the Soccer Fans"	Lindsay Thompson	Denis Banville, Michel Carbonneau, Elie Klimos, and Nick Vallinakis	February 15, 2018
The Reads and the Molinas are having a soccer game watch party. Kate shows interest in the game, but Pal, Killer, and Amigo all think that Kate has been hypnotized and try to save her.
239b	7b	"Pal and the Big Itch"	Peter K. Hirsch	Gerry Capelle	February 15, 2018
Pal has a terrible itch, and his friends help him deal with the pain. When he recovers, he misses his special treatment.

== Voice cast ==
The following list of voice actors below are the actors for the characters in the 21st season of Arthur: (Note: The voice cast information is collected from the closing credits from each episode from Season 21.)

- Jacob Ursomarzo as Arthur Timothy Read
- Daniel Brochu as Buster Baxter
- Christian Distefano as Dora Winifred Read (A.K.A. D.W.), James MacDonald
- Jodie Lynn Resther as Francine Alice Frensky
- Mellisa Altro as Mary Alice Crosswire (A.K.A. Muffy)
- Max Friedman-Cole as Alan Powers (A.K.A. The Brain)
- Bruce Dinsmore as Shelley Barnes (A.K.A. Binky), David L. Read (A.K.A. Mr. Read), Bailey Carson Belvedere III
- Sonja Ball as Jane Read (A.K.A. Ms. Read)
- Arthur Holden as Nigel Charles Ratburn (A.K.A. Mr. Ratburn), Bionic Bunny
- Joanna Noyes as Grandma Thora Read
- A.J. Henderson as Grandpa Dave, Edward Edzel Crosswire (A.K.A. Mr. Crosswire and Ed)
- Tamar Koslov as Prunella Deegan
- Jessie Kardos as Sue Ellen Armstrong
- Devan Cohen as Tommy Tibble
- Samuel Faraci as Timmy Tibble
- Sally Isherwood as Emily
- Hayley Reynolds as Nadine Flumberghast (D.W.'s imaginary friend)
- Holly Gauthier-Frankel as Fern Walters
- Krystal Meadows as Ladonna Compson
- Eleanor Noble as George Lundgren
- Maggie Castle as Molly MacDonald
- Brigid Tierney as Jenna Morgan
- Robyn Thaler as Catherine Frensky
- Julie Lemieux as Bud Tucker Compson
- Bronwen Mantel as Leah MacGrady (Sara MacGrady before the production of the 13th season)
- Eramelinda Boquer as Rubella Deegan
- Mark Camacho as Oliver Frensky
- Jane Wheeler as Mrs. Barnes
- Ellen David as Bitzi Lynne Baxter (A.K.A. Mrs. Baxter)
- Katie Hutchison as Paige Turner
- Susan Glover as Mrs. Wood
- Simon Peacock as Pal
- Tracy Braunstein as Baby Kate (A.K.A. Kate Read)
- Michael Yarmush as Slink
- Scott Beaudin as Rattles
- Jonathan Potts as Mr. Compson

== Production ==
Oasis Animation produced the 21st season of Arthur.
