= Arthur's Nose =

Book by Marc Brown

- Author: Marc Brown
- Illustrator: Marc Brown
- Series: Arthur
- Genre: Children's picture book
- Publisher: Little, Brown and Company
- Publication date: 1976; 50 years ago
- Publication place: United States
- Media type: Paper
- Followed by: Arthur's Eyes

Arthur's Nose is a 1976 children's book written and illustrated by writer Marc Brown, the first book in the Arthur Adventure series. It focuses on the experiences of Arthur Read, a fictional anthropomorphic bipedal aardvark. The character of Arthur later acquired fame and inspired several other picture books and the PBS animated television series adaptation.

== Plot ==
Arthur is a young anthropomorphic aardvark residing in a world populated by anthropomorphic animals. His classmate, Francine, who sits in front of him, frequently complains about Arthur's lengthy nose. A few other remarks regarding the length of his nose inspire Arthur to have it fixed. He then visits a specialist, but decides against the idea of changing his nose even after viewing the other options. Arthur returns to school and is rarely taunted because of his nose, although Francine still complains mildly about it getting in her way.

== Later books ==
After the book's publication, it inspired a series of storybooks chronicling Arthur's childhood experiences. The books showed the progression of years Arthur's character design gradually changed. In earlier books, he—and his family—were aardvarks (real ones, with long snouts, paws and claws, and tails). In later books, their noses (aardvark snouts) gradually receded until they were reduced to a pair of tiny nostrils; their tails also disappeared. In the television series, neither were ever present. Arthur later acquired a pair of eyeglasses, although he got the glasses from the next book Arthur's Eyes because he could not see. Marc Brown's depictions of the other characters also slowly changed and shifted, as did his drawing style. The series would later go on to inspire a popular PBS educational animated television series.

The book was reissued in 2001 to mark its 25th anniversary, with additional drawings showing how Brown developed the character.
