= Tony Mendoza (artist) =

Cuban-American artist

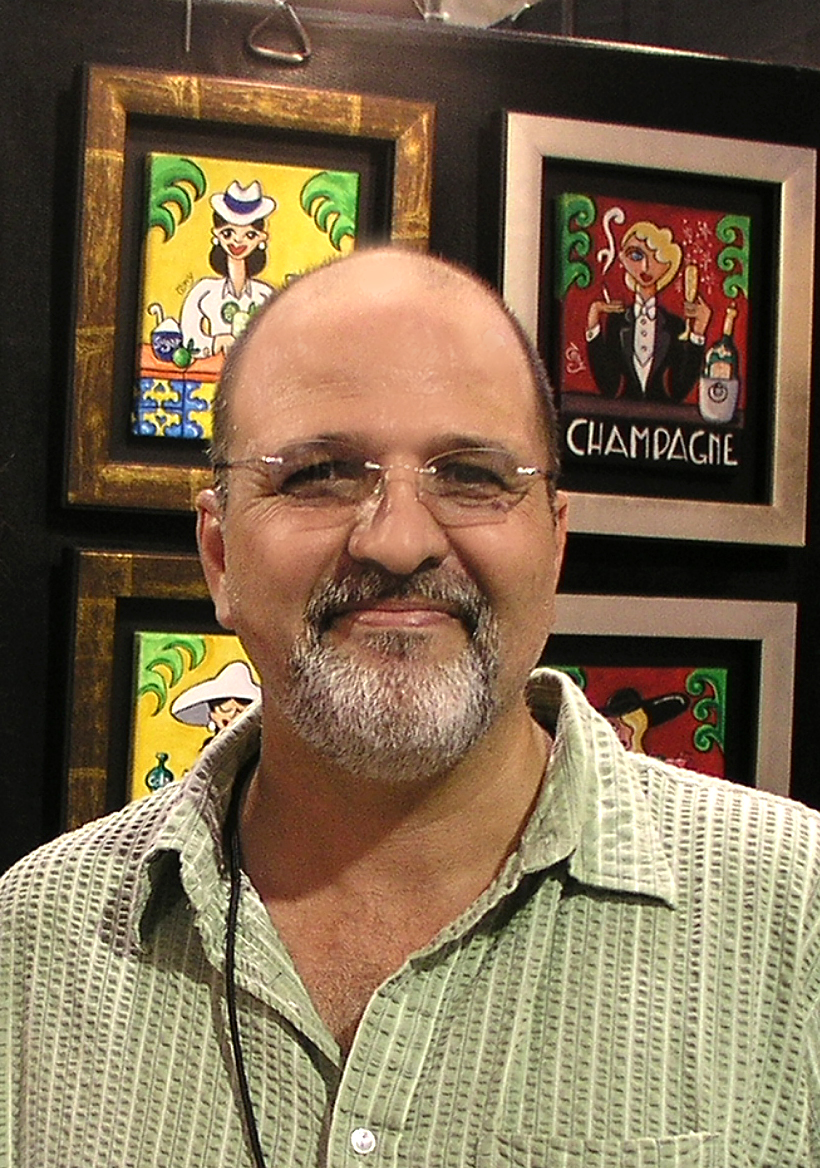
Tony Mendoza poses with some of his work at the Cuba Nostalgia Exhibit in Miami, Florida.

Tony Mendoza (born August 24, 1961 in Newburgh, New York) is a Cuban-American artist with a studio in Miami, Florida. Mendoza's style is Primitive Expressionist and "Caricaturista," a type of art that is whimsical in nature. Mendoza works mainly with acrylic on canvas.

Mendoza was born in New York to Cuban-born parents, but raised in the Little Havana neighborhood of Miami. "Mendoza's simple and colorful paintings uniquely capture the spirit and vibrancy of Miami with a unique style and a great sense of humor." Much of his work centers on the daily life of Little Havana, "the cradle of Cuban culture in Miami."

Mendoza is known for colorful, larger-than-life murals that have become Miami landmarks, "breathing new life into older buildings and creating unique tourist attractions." The murals have been used as a backdrop for TV and print advertising, including a popular television advertisement for the Ford Motor Company. Thousands of tourists have taken photographs in front of one of Mendoza's many murals in Miami.

Mendoza has exhibited his paintings at galleries and shows throughout Florida. His artwork has been featured in the Miami Herald, Miami New Times, Cigar Snob Magazine, Vanidades, Cigar City Magazine, and Selecta Magazine. Mendoza also made an appearance on the Public Broadcasting Service (PBS) series "Postcards from Buster." Mendoza is the winner of the "2007 Arte de América Hispana Competition."

== Main works ==
=== Selected commissions ===
- 2003 "Provincias Mural," Sentir Cubano Building, Miami, Fl
- 2003 "Names of Christ," design for a series of stained glass windows at South West Community Church, Miami, Fl
- 2003 "Calle Ocho Rooster Awards Series," 32 paintings for Kiwanis of Little Havana, Miami, Fl
- 2004 "Rum Cay Map," painting for Bella-Mar Estates, Bahamas
- 2004 "Florida Neighborhood," painting for Neighborhood Lending Partners, Tampa, Fl
- 2004 "Estampa Cubanas Mural," Sentir Cubano Building, Miami, Fl
- 2004 Book illustrations for "Alli Estan Mis Versos" and "Mi Cubania en Prosa" by poet – Lucrecia Rodriguez
- 2005 "Our Lady of the Expressway," painting for Mt. Carmel Catholic Church, Worcester, Ma
- 2005 "Playground," painting for Catholic Charities of the Archdiocese of Miami
- 2005 "El Gallo Mandon," scenery panels for Freddick Bratcher Dance Theater, Miami, Fl
- 2006 "Grace," painting for Catholic Charities of the Archdiocese of Miami
- 2007 Packaging for Javamo Coffee Company, Tampa, Fl
- 2007 Calendar for Leon Medical Centers, Miami, Fl
- 2007 Official Poster for Hollywood Festival of the Arts, Hollywood, Fl
- 2007 Record cover for Apollo Music, Miami, Fl
- 2007 "La Chef," Painting for the March of Dimes Signature Chef Event
- 2007 "Fiesta en el Malecon," Triptych for The Astri Group Inc. Coral Gables, Fl
- 2008 "Rowing," for The South Florida Sprints Rowing Regatta 2008 official poster
- 2009 "Havana Triptych," mural for Robert Sanchez Law, Hialeah, Fl
- 2009 Danzon Festival Poster for Latin Cultural Center
- 2010 "All the Ways We Are Smart," for Gulliver Schools, South Miami, Fl
- 2010 "Tampa Triptych," mural for Weekley, Schulte, Valdes, L.L.C., Tampa, Fl
- 2010 Poster for the AIA National Convention, Miami American Institute of Architects
- 2010 "Royal Palms on Biscayne Bay," large-scale mural at Miami-Dade Public Schools Administration Building, Miami, Fl
- 2011 "City of Schools ," large-scale mural at Miami-Dade Public Schools Administration Building, Miami, Fl
- 2002-2004 Exhibitor, Little Havana Cultural Friday Art Events, Miami, Fl

=== Selected exhibits ===
- 2003 AMCU Latin American Artist Group Show, Miami, Fl
- 2004 Walt Disney World @ Epcot Center "Art in the Garden," Orlando, Fl
- 2004 "Tony Mendoza's Little Havana Solo Exhibit," Brevard College, Cocoa, Fl
- 2004 "Hispanic Art Expressions Group Show," Latin Cultural Center, Miami, Fl
- 2004 "Solo Exhibit," Centro Ybor, Tampa, Fl
- 2005 "Solo Exhibit," Italian American Cultural Center, Worcester, Ma
- 2005 "Libertad Group Show," MDC Tower Theater, Miami, Fl
- 2005 "Hispanic Art Expressions Group Show," Latin Cultural Center, Miami, Fl
- 2006 Featured Artist, Ybor City State Museum, Tampa, Fl
- 2007 Solo Exhibit, Tre-Amici@The Bunker, Tampa, Fl
- 2007 Hispanic Colors & Flairs, Broward Community College, Ft. Lauderdale, Fl
- 2007 Solo Exhibit, The Havana Club, Miami, Fl
- 2008 Exhibit and Lecture, Lowe Art Museum, Coral Gables, Fl
- 2009 "World of Deco Group Exhibit," Historic City Hall, Miami Beach, Fl
- 2009 Solo Exhibit, Hialeah City Hall, Hialeah, Fl
- 2010 Solo Exhibit, South Florida Museum, Bradenton, Fl
- 2011 Solo Exhibit, Aperture Studios, Miami, Fl
- 2011 Exhibit of Limited Edition Prints, Buell Children's Museum, Colorado Springs, CO

=== Catalogs ===
- 2004 2010 Miami Dade County Hispanic Advisory Board's "Hispanic Art Expressions" Catalog
- 2007 Miami Dade County Hispanic Advisory Board's "Hispanic Art Expressions" Catalog, Cover Artist
- 2007 Broward Community College Hispanic Colors and Flairs Catalog
- 2008 Miami Design Preservation League Art Deco Weekend Catalog
- 2009 "Tony Mendoza Presented by the City Of Hialeah" Exhibit Catalog
