= Patricia Alvarado =

American television producer, director, and published photographer

- Born: Patricia Alvarado Núñez
- Education: Emerson College
- Occupations: Television producer; writer; photographer
- Years active: 1988–present
- Notable credit(s): PBS, PBS Kids, American Experience, WGBH-TV, Univision
- Spouse: Alan Catello Grazioso

Patricia Alvarado Núñez is an American television producer, director, and published photographer based in Boston, Massachusetts. She has created, produced, co-produced, executive produced, written and directed television and digitally distributed documentaries, music specials and series on social and cultural issues including the American Experience PBS primetime documentary Fidel in 2004, an episode of PBS Kids' Postcards from Buster which was nominated for a 2008 Daytime Emmy Award for Outstanding Children Series. She later served as the Creator and Series Producer of the WGBH series "Neighborhood Kitchens" which won a New England Emmy Award in 2014. Patricia was an Executive Producer of "Sing That Thing," an amateur choral group competition television series which ran for four seasons by broadcaster WGBH. Alvarado Núñez is currently the Executive Producer of WGBH's World Channel online, television, and podcast series "Stories from the Stage" which broadcast nationally on the PBS network and won two Webby Awards.

== Background ==
She attended Emerson College in Boston where she received a master's degree in global marketing communications and advertising. In 1999, she married independent filmmaker and Daytime Emmy Award nominated television producer Alan Catello Grazioso who's an executive producer of multimedia at Harvard University's Harvard Radcliffe Institute in Cambridge, Massachusetts. In November 2012, Alvarado Núñez debuted her blog series on WGBH.org with an article entitled "Five Gluten-Free Recipes from Around the World. She was series producer of one of the United States longest-running Latino public television series La Plaza at WGBH-TV which continuously broadcast for 34 years. At the invitation of the World Bank, Alvarado Núñez represented the United States public broadcasting industry as a panelist at the 4th International Public Media Forum "Sustainability, Inclusion and the New Latin American Reality" in Brasília, Brazil. and the 6th International Public Media Forum in Bogotá, Colombia. Patricia won her 5th Emmy Award on June 7, 2014 for "Outstanding Informational/Instructional Series" for her work on "Neighborhood Kitchens."

== Television work ==
During 2021, Alvarado won her second Webby Award as executive producer of the GBH national series “Stories from the Stage.” In 2004, Alvarado co-produced "Fidel," a two-hour documentary about the life of Fidel Castro. In 2001, Alvarado'sdocumentary Getting to Fenway aired on WGBH-TV and won Best Sports Special at the New England Emmy Awards. Alvarado produced the public television series María Hinojosa: One-on-One, a five-year running studio-based program hosted by Maria Hinojosa and distributed nationally by American Public Television, won Best National Informational Program at the Imagen Awards in Los Angeles.

Alvarado has produced interviews with notable celebrities including Tony winning playwright, American composer, lyricist, singer, actor, and Hamilton creator Lin-Manuel Miranda, Queen Noor of Jordan, entertainers Tony Plana, Phylicia Rashād, Jimmy Smits, Cheech Marin of Cheech & Chong, novelist Junot Díaz, Sapphire author of the book Push (novel), Grammy award-winning musicians Chucho Valdés, Danilo Pérez and Paquito D'Rivera, journalist Alfredo Corchado, Jorge Ramos (news anchor), and María Elena Salinas, sports legends such as Bill Lee (left-handed pitcher) and Luis Tiant, and others.

== Photography work ==
Alvarado's photography work has been featured in print and on-line on WGBH and PBS related websites including the PBS.org website MyType2, Neighborhood Kitchens online, WGBH High School Quiz Show online (seasons 1 & 2), WGBH Digital Mural. Her photography featured on RootCapital.org was taken in Peru, Rwanda and Kenya. Alvarado's photography work was published twice as the front cover of the September 2013 and May 2015 editions of WGBH Explore! Member Magazine and in The Boston Globe article by Glenn Yoder in the June 19, 2012 online and print editions.

== Awards and nominations ==
1. (Won) Gold Signal Award, Most Inspirational Podcast, 2026 - Stories from the Stage: Everyday Heroes - GBH/WORLD Channel - Boston
2. (Won) Gracie Award, Non-fiction Entertainment, 2025 - Stories from the Stage - GBH/WORLD Channel - Boston
3. (Won) Webby Award, 2021 - Stories from the Stage: Growing Up Black - GBH/WORLD Channel - Boston
4. (Won) Webby People's Voice Award, 2020 - Stories from the Stage: Gastor's Lesson in Heavy, High & Far - GBH/WORLD Channel - Boston
5. (Won) New England Emmy Award, 2014 - Neighborhood Kitchens - WGBH - Boston
6. (Won) Imagen Award, Best National Informational Program, 2011 - Maria Hinojosa: One-on-One - WGBH - Boston
7. (Nominated) Daytime Emmy Award, 2008 - Postcards from Buster - PBS Kids
8. (Won) Parents' Choice Award, 2008 - Postcards from Buster - PBS Kids

== Selected filmography & photography ==
=== Executive producer ===
- 2026, 2025, 2024, 2023, 2022, 2021, 2020, 2019, 2018, 2017 : Stories From The Stage (WGBH) (Season Ten - currently in production)
- 2019, 2018, 2017, 2016, 2015, 2014: Sing That Thing (WGBH) (Season One - produced six episodes, Season Two - produced eight episodes)

=== Senior news producer ===
- 2014: WGBH News (produced 15 television, radio and online stories - completed)

=== Series producer ===
- 2013: Neighborhood Kitchens (WGBH season two - produced 13 half-hour episodes - completed)
- 2011-2012: Neighborhood Kitchens (WGBH season one - produced 12 half-hour episodes - completed)
- 2011-2006: María Hinojosa: One-on-One (WGBH, APT - 5 seasons - produced 85 half-hour episodes)

=== Producer ===
- 2006: Postcards from Buster ("Your Friend, My Friend") which was nominated for a 2008 national daytime Emmy Award for Outstanding Children's Series at the 35th ceremonies of the Academy of Television Arts & Sciences at Lincoln Center in New York City.
- 2002: WGBH-TV 2003 production El Tiante: A Red Sox Story, featuring Boston Red Sox Hall of Fame pitcher Luis Tiant, which premiered at the Harvard Film Archives and on television on GBH Channel 2 (PBS-Boston).

=== Co-producer ===
- 2005: Fidel Castro - (2 hour PBS special - domestically aired on American Experience (PBS) and internationally on the National Geographic Channel)"

=== Photographer ===
- 2024: Portrait of Devi Lockwood: Radcliffe Moments: Friendship through the Archives—Outdoor and online exhibition celebrating the 25th anniversary of Harvard Radcliffe Institute of Harvard University. Display Location: Radcliffe Yard from September to December, 2024
- 2024: Portrait of Narges Mahyar: Radcliffe Moments: Communicating Climate Change—Outdoor and online exhibition celebrating the 25th anniversary of Harvard Radcliffe Institute of Harvard University. Display Location: Radcliffe Yard from September to December, 2024
