= Arthur season 22 =

Season of television series

Arthur
- Season 22
- No. of episodes: 4 (8 segments)

Release
- Original network: PBS Kids
- Original release: May 13 – May 16, 2019

Season chronology
- ← Previous; Season 21 Next → Season 23

The twenty-second season of Arthur started airing on PBS Kids in the United States from May 13, 2019 to May 16, 2019. Jane Lynch guest starred in the episode "Mr. Ratburn and the Special Someone", which achieved a nomination for the GLAAD Media Award for Outstanding Kids and Family Programming, though was withheld from broadcast on PBS' Alabama and Arkansas stations. In this season, Roman Lutterotti replaced Jacob Ursomarzo as Arthur, Ethan Pugiotto replaced Christian Distefano as D.W., and Evan Blaylock replaced Max Friedman Cole as Brain, thus becoming their respective characters' final voice actors in the television series (though The Arthur Podcast introduced further voice actor changes).

== Production ==
On March 28, 2018, Jessica Kardos, the voice of Sue Ellen Armstrong revealed on Twitter that she and Holly Gauthier-Frankel (the voice of Fern Walters) were recording new episodes of Arthur. New episodes were still being recorded as late as November 2018.

On May 25, 2018, Bruce Dinsmore (the voice of Binky Barnes, Mr. Read, and Bailey) confirmed that he had recorded new episodes, saying, "we got lots more coming" and "there's some good surprises". Dinsmore also revealed that there will be a guest star this season, who is "an actress everyone would know". (Note: This was later revealed to be Jane Lynch.)

The first official announcement of Season 22 came on June 4, 2018 when Oasis Animation confirmed that it would produce four more seasons of Arthur. This would take the show to Season 25.

On November 16, 2018, Dinsmore announced on Twitter that he had recorded his "very last session" for Arthur. (Note: This is specifically referring to the Arthur TV series. Dinsmore has subsequently voiced Binky Barnes in later Arthur-related content.) He later clarified that "he didn't intend to make an announcement of any kind", and that Arthur had "lots of new episodes coming". (Note: This is true, since the final four seasons were recorded together, the voice work for this season would have coincided with the voice work for Season 23, 24, and 25 (the final season).)

== Episodes ==
No. overall	No. in season	Title	Written by	Storyboard by	Original release date
240a	1a	"Mr. Ratburn and the Special Someone"	Peter K. Hirsch	Allan Jeffrey	May 13, 2019
Arthur and his friends are shockingly surprised that Mr. Ratburn is getting married. During the wedding, they learn that he has married a man. NOTE: The episode was withheld from airing by Alabama Public Television (APT) and the Arkansas Educational Television Network (AETN) as it showcased same-sex marriage.
240b	1b	"The Feud"	Jonathan Greenberg	Hélène Cossette & Nick Vallinakis	May 13, 2019
Arthur and Buster play a Dark Bunny video game, and when the game breaks, both of them accuse each other of sabotage and break up. Meanwhile, the rest of their friends choose sides and split into "teams" even after Arthur and Buster get over the fight. Together with Binky, they hatch a plan to squash the feud between their classmates.
241a	2a	"When Rivals Came to Roost"	Eliza Bent & Glen Berger	Jeremy O’Neill	May 14, 2019
A classroom at Mighty Mountain Elementary School gets flooded, and its students move to Lakewood Elementary with Mr. Ratburn's class.
241b	2b	"The Longest Eleven Minutes"	Sarah Katin & Nakia Trower Shuman	Karine Charlebois	May 14, 2019
Arthur, Muffy, Buster, and Ladonna must find something to do after the internet is out.
242a	3a	"Muffy's House Guests"	McPaul Smith	Jeremy O’Neill	May 15, 2019
Muffy is terrified when peregrine falcons build a nest outside her bedroom window.
242b	3b	"Binky Can't Always Get What He Wants"	Peter Ferland	Julien Dufour	May 15, 2019
Binky must choose between starring in a television commercial or performing in a talent show.
243a	4a	"Muffy's Car Campaign"	Matt Hoverman & Peter K. Hirsch	Hélène Cossette & Jeremy O'Neill	May 16, 2019
When Muffy is worried that a petition to help protect the environment may put Crosswire Motors out of business permanently, she starts a car campaign.
243b	4b	"Truth or Poll"	Sarah Katin & Nakia Trower Shuman	Daniel Miodini & Andreas Schuster	May 16, 2019
Binky and the Brain make biased polls, leading to unpopular changes around the school.
