= William Healy (actor) =

Canadian actor

- Born: September 29, 2001 (age 24); Toronto, Ontario, Canada
- Occupation: Actor
- Years active: 2011–present

William Healy (born September 29, 2001) is a Canadian television actor, known for Arthur (2014–2016), voicing the title character for the 18th and 19th seasons (replacing Drew Adkins), and also Warehouse 13 (2009).

== Biography ==
Healy was born September 29, 2001, in Toronto, Ontario, Canada, to actor/teacher Christopher Healy.

Healy continues his actor training and attends an Arts school in Toronto. He earned his black belt in Taekwondo with gold medals in competition.

== Filmography ==
Film
Year	Title	Role	Notes
2015	Crimson Peak	Young Alan	

Television
Year	Title	Role	Notes
2017	Titans	Matt	Episode: "101"
2011	Warehouse 13	Young Daniel Varley	Episode: "3...2...1"
2014–2016	Arthur	Arthur (voice)	Seasons 18 and 19

Preceded by Drew Adkins	Voice of Arthur Read; 2014-2016	Succeeded by Jacob Urzamarzo
