= Marc Brown (author) =

American author and illustrator (born 1946)

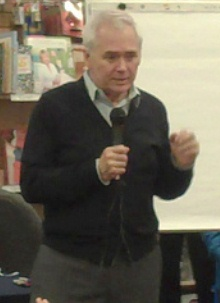
- Brown at a Naperville, Illinois bookstore in April 2011
- Born: Marc Tolon Brown; November 25, 1946 (age 79); Erie, Pennsylvania, U.S.
- Education: Cleveland Institute of Art
- Occupations: Author; illustrator; television producer
- Spouses: Stephanie Marini (m. 1968; div. 1977) Laurene Krasny (m. 1983)
- Children: 3
- Writing career
- Years active: 1969–present
- Genres: Children's books, television shows

Marc Tolon Brown (born November 25, 1946) is an American illustrator and children's book author best known for writing and illustrating the Arthur book series, which was later adapted into an animated TV series that aired on PBS Kids and other country channels. He has also written and illustrated other books, and collaborated with his wife Laurene Krasny Brown on the Dino Life Guides for Families series.

== Early life and education ==
Marc Brown was raised in Erie, Pennsylvania, where his father worked on the railroad. He grew up with his three younger sisters Bonnie, Colleen and Kim. As a child, Brown had a close relationship with his Grandma Thora who passionately encouraged him to pursue art from a young age, and captivated him with made-up stories (including scary tales told without her false teeth).

Many people in Brown's childhood, including Grandma Thora, were direct inspirations for characters he later wrote in the Arthur series. The character Mr. Ratburn is based on Brown's seventh grade algebra teacher, Gary Rathbun, and his own best friend, Terry Johnson, was the basis for Buster.

While attending McDowell High School, Brown began using watercolors at the suggestion of his art teacher, Nancy Bryan, who supported his future as an artist. In Brown's 2022 inspirational book which compiles quotes and life lessons from the Arthur books and TV series called Believe in Yourself: What We Learned from Arthur, he wrote that "one day she told me to get my portfolio and drove me to the Cleveland Institute of Art for an interview. I left that day with an invitation to return in the fall on a full scholarship."

== Career ==
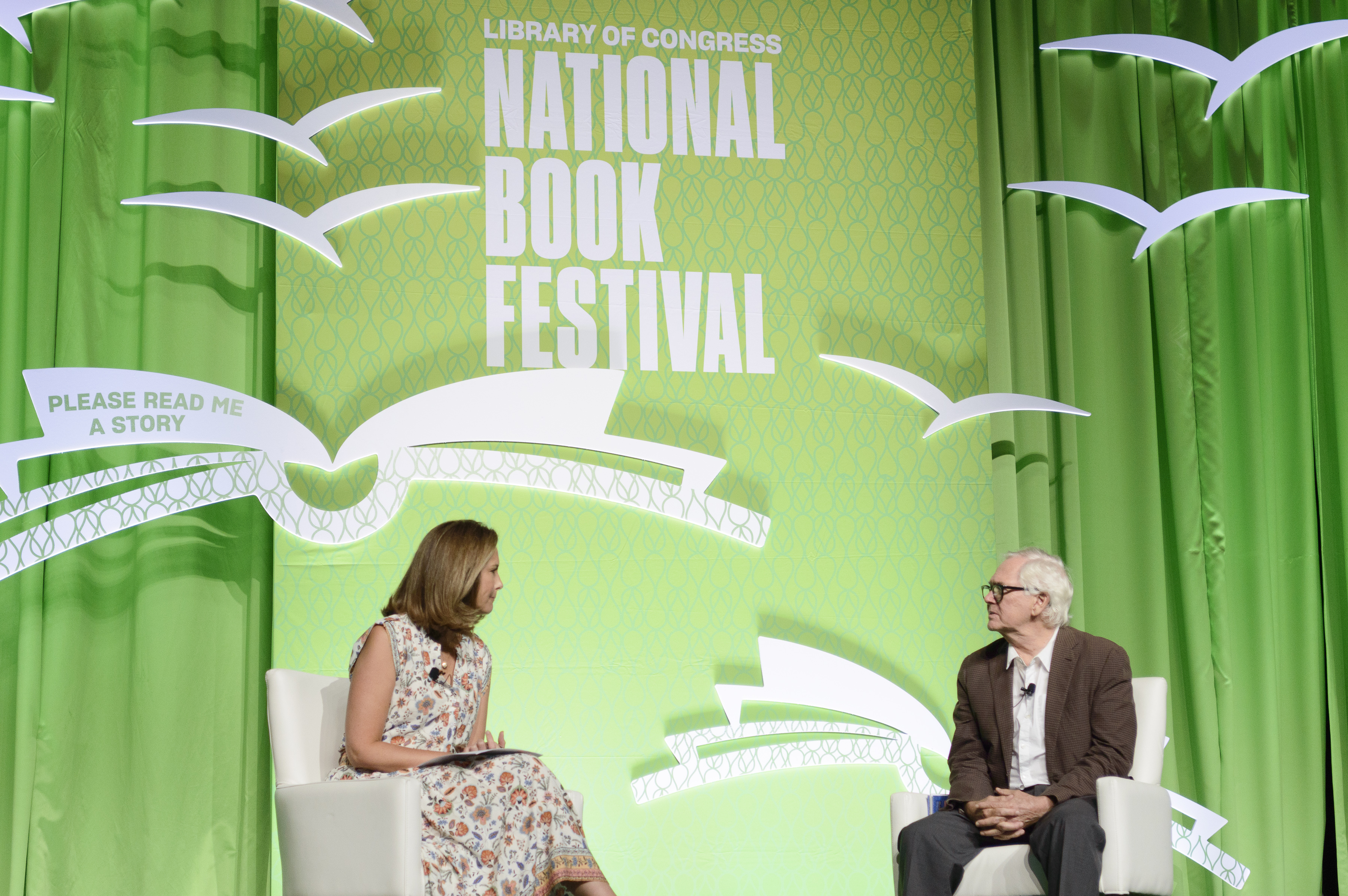
Brown interviewed by Alison Starling at the National Book Festival in 2022

Brown graduated from Cleveland Institute of Art in 1968 with a degree in graphic design. In 1970, Brown illustrated his first book, What Makes the Sun Shine by Isaac Asimov.

Before Brown pursued children's literature, he attempted a variety of jobs. He did not succeed as a truck driver due to poor sense of direction, and he lost his next job in the television industry. He got a job teaching art at Garland Junior College in Boston, but the college went bankrupt after a semester, leaving Brown unemployed. Meanwhile, his wife moved out of the house due to marital issues, eventually resulting in divorce.

"I was literally rescued by Arthur."
– Marc Brown, in the opening line of Believe in Yourself: What We Learned from Arthur

Around this time, Brown's 4-year-old son Tolon asked for a bedtime story about a weird animal, and Brown came up with the character of Arthur, an anthropomorphized aardvark. "I was kind of depressed. I didn’t know what I was going to do to put food on the table", Brown later said. In 1976, Brown published his first picture book, Arthur's Nose with Little, Brown. It was not immediately successful, but he continued to write and illustrate stories about the same characters, and popularity grew over several years until the series was well-known.

On October 7, 1996, an animated television series based on the Arthur books premiered on PBS Kids (then-known as PTV before it was rebranded in September 1999), produced by WGBH and CINAR Films of Montreal. The show surpassed Barney & Friends as PBS's top children's programming for three years (1997, 2000, 2001). Brown was an executive producer on the show for seasons ten through twenty-five, and is a three-time Emmy award winner. Aiming for an audience aged between five and ten years old, the show ran for nearly 25 years, officially ending on February 21, 2022. "I knew it couldn’t go on forever and ever. And 25 years seemed like a nice number", Brown said in an interview with Variety.

=== Inspiration and reception ===
Brown sees himself in all the characters, but especially Arthur. "I guess Arthur is most like me. Sometimes I really frighten myself when I look at a photo that was taken of me in the third grade. I’m wearing a bow tie just like Arthur." Brown credits artists like Marc Chagall and Maurice Sendak, author of Where the Wild Things Are, as influences.

In a 2001 interview, Brown said he received about 100,000 letters a year from fans of Arthur, and he said that if children call his home and ask for Arthur, his wife replied that Arthur was "at the library".

== Personal life ==
Brown married Stephanie Marini, a ballet dancer and college teacher, on September 1, 1968. They had two sons, Tolon and Tucker, before the marriage ended in divorce in 1977. On September 11, 1983, Brown married his second wife, Laurene Krasny, a writer and a psychologist at Harvard University. They had a daughter, Eliza. The names of Brown's children are hidden in the Arthur books' illustrations.

Brown said in a 2003 interview, "I like to rise early, watch the sun rise over Hingham Harbor, and work". He worked at night sometimes, too, and typically focused on multiple projects at one time.

== Bibliography ==
=== Arthur books ===
==== Arthur Adventure series ====
- 1976 – Arthur's Nose
- 1979 – Arthur's Eyes
- 1980 – Arthur's Valentine
- 1981 – The True Francine (later republished and retitled in 1996 as "Arthur and the True Francine")
- 1982 – Arthur Goes to Camp
- 1982 – Arthur's Halloween
- 1983 – Arthur's April Fool
- 1983 – Arthur's Thanksgiving
- 1984 – Arthur's Christmas
- 1985 – Arthur's Tooth
- 1986 – Arthur's Teacher Trouble
- 1987 – Arthur's Baby
- 1989 – Arthur's Birthday
- 1990 – Arthur's Pet Business
- 1991 – Arthur Meets the President
- 1992 – Arthur Babysits
- 1993 – Arthur's Family Vacation
- 1993 – Arthur's New Puppy
- 1994 – Arthur's Chicken Pox
- 1994 – Arthur's First Sleepover
- 1995 – Arthur's TV Trouble
- 1996 – Arthur Writes a Story
- 1997 – Arthur's Computer Disaster
- 1998 – Arthur Lost and Found
- 1999 – Arthur's Underwear
- 2000 – Arthur's Teacher Moves In
- 2011 – Arthur Turns Green

==== Arthur 8×8 paperbacks ====
- Arthur's Birthday Surprise
- Arthur's Heart Mix-Up
- Arthur's Jelly Beans
- Arthur Off to School
- Good Night, D.W.
- Arthur's Homework
- D.W.'s Perfect Present
- Arthur's Mystery Babysitter
- Arthur and the Big Snow
- D.W. the Big Boss
- Arthur Helps Out
- Arthur Tells a Story
- Arthur to the Rescue
- Arthur and the Dog Show
- Arthur Jumps into Fall
- Arthur's Tree House

==== Arthur chapter books ====
- Arthur's Mystery Envelope
- Arthur and the Scare-Your-Pants-Off Club
- Arthur Makes the Team
- Arthur and the Crunch Cereal Contest
- Arthur Accused!
- Locked in the Library!
- Buster's Dino Dilemma
- The Mystery of the Stolen Bike
- Arthur and the Lost Diary
- Who's in Love with Arthur?
- Arthur Rocks with Binky
- Arthur and the Popularity Test
- King Arthur
- Francine, Believe It or Not
- Arthur and the Cootie-Catcher
- Buster Makes the Grade
- Muffy's Secret Admirer
- Arthur and the Poetry Contest
- Buster Baxter, Cat Saver
- Arthur and the Big Blow-Up
- Arthur and the Perfect Brother
- Francine the Superstar
- Buster's New Friend
- Binky Rules
- Arthur and the Double Dare
- Arthur and the No-Brainer
- Arthur and the Comet Crisis
- Arthur and the 1,001 Dads
- Arthur Plays the Blues
- Arthur and the Bad-Luck Brain
- Arthur Loses His Marbles
- Arthur and the Nerves of Steal
- Arthur and the World Record

==== Good Sports chapter books ====
- Arthur and the Race to Read
- Arthur and the Seventh-Inning Stretcher
- Arthur and the Recess Rookie
- Arthur and the Best Coach Ever
- Arthur and the Goalie Ghost
- Arthur and the Pen-Pal Playoff

==== Arthur graphic novels ====
Illustrated by Jarrett J. Krosoczka

- Arthur Makes a Comic
- Arthur's Underwear

=== Beginner books ===
- 1982 – Wings on Things
- 1983 – Spooky Riddles

=== Other books written and illustrated by Marc Brown ===
- One, Two, Three: An Animal Counting Book
- Marc Brown's Full House
- Moose and Goose
- Lenny and Lola
- The Cloud Over Clarence
- Pickle Things
- Finger Rhymes
- Witches Four
- Your First Garden Book
- Count to Ten
- Marc Brown's Boat Book
- Dinosaurs, Beware! A Safety Guide (co-written with Stephen Krensky)
- The Silly Tail Book
- Perfect Pigs: An Introduction to Manners (also co-written with Stephen Krensky)
- What Do You Call a Dumb Bunny?: And Other Rabbit Riddles, Games, Jokes, and Cartoons
- There's No Place Like Home
- Hand Rhymes
- Play Rhymes
- Party Rhymes
- Marc Brown's Play-Pops: One, Two, Buckle my Shoe
- Marc Brown's Play-Pops: Can You Jump Like a Frog?
- Marc Brown's Play-Pops: Teddy Bear, Teddy Bear
- Marc Brown's Play-Pops: Two Little Monkeys
- Scared Silly!: A Book for the Brave
- Monster's Lunch Box
- Playtime Rhymes
- In New York
- Monkey: Not Ready for Kindergarten
- Monkey: Not Ready for the Baby
- Monkey: Not Ready for Bedtime

=== Other books illustrated by Marc Brown ===
- What Makes the Sun Shine? by Isaac Asimov
- The Iron Lion by Peter Dickinson
- I Found Them In the Yellow Pages by Norma Farber
- Ride! Ride! Ride! by Marcia Wiesbauer
- Four Corners of the Sky by Theodore Clymer
- Super Sam and the Salad Garden by Patty Wolcott
- My Doctor Bag Book by Kathleen N. Daly
- How the Rabbit Stole the Moon by Louise Moeri
- Little Owl by Janwillem Van de Wetering
- There Goes Feathertop! by Norma Farber
- Why the Tides Ebb and Flow by Joan C. Bowden
- Rabbit's New Rug by Judy Delton
- The Banza: A Haitian Story by Diane Wolkstein
- What's So Funny, Ketu? by Verna Aardema
- Swamp Monsters by Mary Blount Christian
- Little Witch's Big Night by Deborah Hautzig
- Oh, Kojo! How Could You! by Verna Aardema
- Go West, Swamp Monsters! by Mary Blount Christian
- Happy Birthday, Little Witch by Deborah Hautzig
- A World Full of Monsters by John Troy McQueen
- Read-Aloud Rhymes For the Very Young by Jack Prelutsky
- The Family Read Aloud Christmas Treasury selected by Alice Low
- The Family Read Aloud Holiday Treasury selected by Alice Low
- Wild About Books by Judy Sierra
- The Gulps by Rosemary Wells
- Born to Read by Judy Sierra
- Buying, Training, and Caring for Your Dinosaur by Laura Joy Rennert
- Dancing Feet! by Lindsey Craig
- Farmyard Beat by Lindsey Craig
- ZooZical by Judy Sierra
- Wild About You by Judy Sierra
- If All the Animals Came Inside by Eric Pinder
- Ten Tiny Toes by Todd Tarpley
- The Little Shop of Monsters by R. L. Stine
- Mary McScary by R. L. Stine
- Everyone Counts by Judy Sierra
- Why Did the Monster Cross the Road? by R. L. Stine

=== Books by Laurene Krasny Brown and Marc Brown ===
Dino Life Guides for Families series

- Dinosaurs Divorce: A Guide for Changing Families
- Dinosaurs Travel: A Guide for Families on the Go
- Dinosaurs Alive and Well!: A Guide to Good Health
- Dinosaurs to the Rescue!: A Guide to Protecting Our Planet (later republished and retitled as "Dinosaurs Go Green!: A Guide to Protecting Our Planet")
- When Dinosaurs Die: A Guide to Understanding Death
- How to Be a Friend: A Guide to Making Friends and Keeping Them
- Democracy for Dinosaurs: A Guide for Young Citizens

Other

- The Bionic Bunny Show
- Visiting the Art Museum
- Baby Time
- Toddler Time
- Yellow Fish, Blue Fish
- What's the Big Secret?: Talking about Sex with Girls and Boys
