= Arthur Read =

Fictional character

- Arthur character
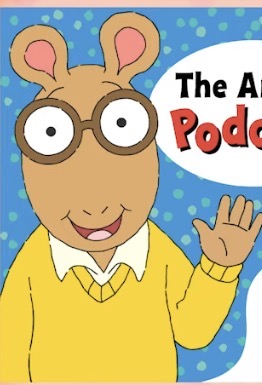
- First appearance: Arthur's Nose (1976)
- Created by: Marc Brown
- Voiced by: Duncan Wold (Living Books: 1992–1994); Michael Yarmush (1996–2000; 2022, All Grown Up); Kye Sones (Living Books, UK versions); Ben Ellis (Living Books: 1997–2001, Arthur's 1st Grade); Pamela Segall (Arthur's Math Carnival, Arthur's Thinking Games, Arthur's Reading Games); Philip Penalosa (singing voice in Arthur's Perfect Christmas); Justin Bradley (2001); Mark Rendall (2002–2003); Cameron Ansell (2004–2007); Carr Thompson (2006, Arthur's Missing Pal); Dallas Jokic (2008–2012); Drew Adkins (2012–2014); William Healy (2014–2016); Jacob Ursomarzo (2016–2019); Roman Lutterotti (2019–2022)

In-universe information
- Species: Aardvark
- Gender: Boy
- Family: David Read (father); Jane Read (mother); Dora Winifred "D.W." Read (younger sister); Kate Read (youngest sister); Pal (pet dog)
- Relatives: Grandma Thora Read (paternal grandmother); Grandpa Dave Read (maternal grandfather); Unnamed Paternal Grandfather; Unnamed Maternal Grandmother; Bud (uncle); Loretta (aunt); Ricky (cousin); Monique "Mo" (cousin); Bonnie (aunt); Sean (uncle); George (cousin); Lucy (aunt); Jessica (aunt); Richard (uncle); Cora (cousin); Fred (uncle); Theodore "Theo" Read (grand-uncle); Dora Winfred Read (paternal grand-aunt); Gustav (great-great grandfather); Matthew (great-great-great uncle); Minnie Read (aunt); Jimmy (cousin); Lorain; Chrissy (aunt); Ryder (cousin); Laurie (cousin); Miles (extended family)
- Birthday: May 25
- Best friends: Buster Baxter; Alan “Brain” Powers; Muffy Crosswire; Francine Frensky; Binky Barnes; George Lundgren; Alex Davidson; LaDonna Compson; Molly McDonald; Adil Akyuz
- Age: 8

Arthur Timothy Read is a fictional anthropomorphic aardvark created by the author Marc Brown. The titular main character of the book and television series Arthur, he is in the third grade and lives in the fictional city of Elwood City with his family, which include father David, mother Jane, and sisters Dora Winifred "D.W." and Kate Read, and many friends, including his best friend Buster Baxter.

A student of Lakewood Elementary School, Arthur is characterized as an average child and the moral center within his friend group. Arthur loves the library and reading books, and loves the superhero Bionic Bunny. He is calm and friendly, but if he is pushed to his limits, he can display bouts of anger.

== Character biography ==
An eight-year-old anthropomorphic aardvark, Arthur is the eldest child of the Read family, who include younger sisters Dora Winifred "D.W." Read and baby Kate Read. Arthur's parents are his mother, work-at-home accountant Jane, and father David, who runs a catering business; he also has a pet puppy named Pal. (Note: Pal's breed is never mentioned, but his father is an English Setter) At Lakewood Elementary, Arthur makes himself at home with his friends, which include Buster, Francine, Muffy, the Brain, Binky, and Sue Ellen. Despite being relatively calm and friendly, Arthur is prone to making misjudgements and has been shown to have bouts of anger if provoked. Arthur is commonly placed into problems revolving around his friends and family; most of all younger sister D.W., who displays bratty behavior towards her older brother. A moral center within his circle of friends, Arthur is depicted as an ordinary kid who likes to read books. He shares the same birthdate, May 25, with Muffy.

In addition to his nuclear family of five, Arthur is also shown to have grandparents, Grandma Thora (David's mother) and Dave (Jane's father), have appeared, along with uncles Fred (Jane's brother), Richard, Bud, and Sean, aunts Jessica, Loretta, and Lucy, cousins Cora, Monique, Ricky, George, and other unnamed relatives. However, the only two members of Arthur's extended family who have appeared more than once are his grandparents. Thora lives in a house not too far from Arthur's in Elwood City and is known to be a bad cook, but a loving grandmother and a world-class marbles player. She loves to play bingo every Friday night, and in some episodes has to watch over Arthur and D.W. She is good friends with Mrs. McGrady, the school cafeteria monitor. Grandpa Dave lives in a convalescent home and has a roommate who was a ship captain.

The future life of Arthur is depicted in some episodes; "The Contest" and "All Grown Up" depict him as a teenager and adult, respectively. The latter reveals him to have become a graphic novelist who would write a story about his own childhood.

== Development ==
While his character has mostly remained the same, Arthur's appearance has changed after the publication of Brown's first Arthur book, Arthur's Nose (1976). The character's most recognizable form is a light brown, slanted face with small ears and nostrils with signature round brown-rimmed eyeglasses. The book "Arthur's Eyes" depicts him getting his glasses for the first time, a trait that carries over to future depictions of the character.

Arthur's first appearance depicted him with a long nose, which makes him more closely resemble an actual aardvark, though as the books progressed (as seen in the first season of PBS's Reading Rainbow in its 13th episode, titled "Arthur's Eyes") and eventually became an animated TV series, his appearance changed. Normally, Arthur wears a yellow V-neck sweater over a white dress shirt, blue jeans along with red and white sneakers. He also occasionally wears a red rugby-style sweater. In the series finale ("All Grown Up"), Arthur's 28-year-old appearance features him with straight dark brown hair, slight facial hair, a green vest with a hood, and a red and yellow shirt with a Dark Bunny insignia.

== Voice actors ==
Numerous children voice actors from Canada have voiced the character of Arthur throughout its run.

- Michael Yarmush (Seasons 1–5) (1996–2000)
- Justin Bradley (Season 6) (2001)
- Mark Rendall (Seasons 7–8, season 6 redub) (2002–03)
- Cameron Ansell (Seasons 9–11) (2004–07)
- Dallas Jokic (Seasons 12–15) (2008–12)
- Drew Adkins (Seasons 16–17) (2012–14)
- William Healy (Seasons 18–19) (2014–16)
- Jacob Ursomarzo (Seasons 20–21) (2016–18)
- Roman Lutterotti (Seasons 22–25) (2019–22)

Michael Yarmush provided the voice for the character during the first five seasons from 1996 to 2000, before experiencing puberty. He later returned to voice the adult version of Arthur in the series finale, "All Grown Up," in 2022. In 2001, Justin Bradley took over for Season 6, marking a transition that coincided with his own puberty. Mark Rendall succeeded him for Seasons 7 and 8, from 2002 to 2003. Cameron Ansell voiced the character from Seasons 9 to 11 between 2004 and 2007, followed by Dallas Jokic, who took on the role in Seasons 12 to 15 from 2008 to 2012. Drew Adkins continued as the voice in Seasons 16 and 17 from 2012 to 2014, with William Healy following in Seasons 18 and 19 from 2014 to 2016. Jacob Ursomarzo voiced the character in Seasons 20 and 21 from 2016 to 2018, while Roman Lutterotti rounded out the series in the final four seasons from 2019 to 2022. Wyatt White provides his voice in The Arthur Podcast.

=== International voice actors ===
Since Arthur is shown in more than 80 countries, Arthur is dubbed by these young voice actors (in several languages) shown here:

- Alfredo Leal (Seasons 1–2), Hector Emmanuel Gómez (Seasons 3–5), Kalimba Marichal (singing voice) (Latin American Spanish)
- Diego Larrea, Caio César (second voice), Thiago Farias (third voice), Melania Pontillo (fourth voice), Wirley Contaifer (fifth voice) & José Leonardo (Brazilian Portuguese)
- Matko Knešaurek (Seasons 1–4) and Zoran Pribičević (Seasons 9–11) (Croatian)
- Jan Maxian (Czech)
- Olli Parviainen (Finnish)
- Lawrence Arcouette (Seasons 1–3), Kim Jalabert (Seasons 4–6) (First dub in Quebecois French), Vincent de Bouard (Seasons 7–15), and Émilie Guillaume (Seasons 16–present) (2nd dub in European French) (French)
- Konrad Bösherz (German)
- Argiris Paulidis (ERT), Andria Rapti (Audio Visual), Vasia Lakoumenta (Good Brothers Studios), Nektarios Theodorou (City Studios) (Greek)
- Baráth István (Hungarian)
- Debbi Besserglick and Shiri Gadni (Besserglick voiced Arthur from its first run until her death from cancer in 2005. After her death, she was replaced by Shiri Gadni as the voice of Arthur in the following seasons.) (Hebrew)
- Simone D'Andrea (Italian)
- Lee Mi-ja (Daekyo) and Jeong Ok-joo (EBS) (Korean)
- Iman Bitar (1st voice) and Eman Hayel (2nd voice) (Arabic)
- Fariba Shahin Moghadam (Persian)
- Håvard Bakke (Norwegian)
- Teresa Chaves (1st voice), Paula Seabra (2nd voice) and Carlos Martins (3rd voice) (European Portuguese)
- Petre Ghimbăşan (Romanian)
- Zoltán Karácsonyi (1st voice) and Marko Marković (2nd voice) (Serbian)
- Elisabet Bargalló (Castilian Spanish)
- Leo Hallerstam (Swedish)

== Reception ==
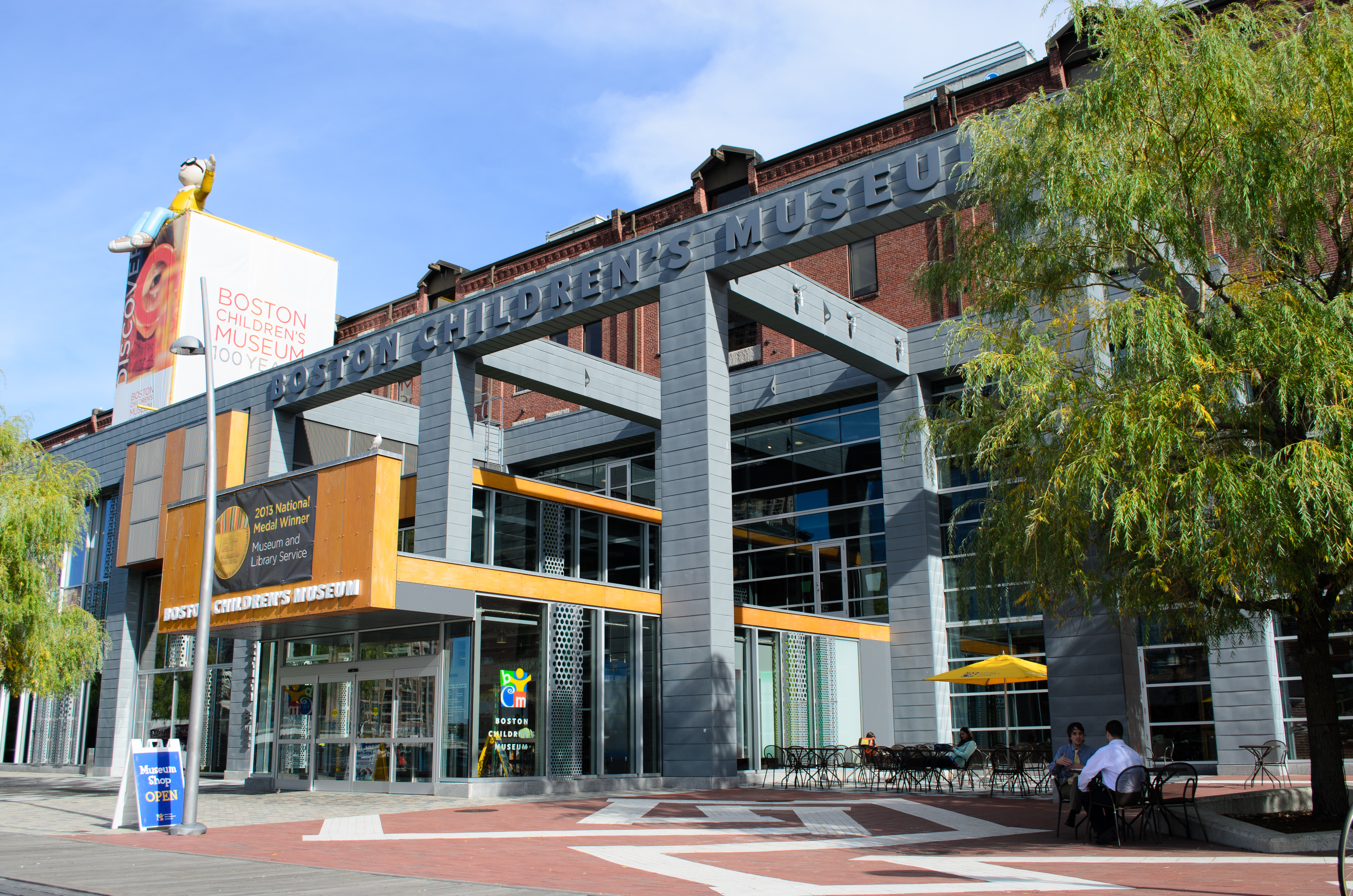
Boston Children's Museum displaying an inflatable Arthur on the roof to advertise the "Arthur and Friends" exhibit within.

The character received generally positive reviews from critics and audiences, praising him for his being relatable, calm nature and for being a good role model Arthur Read was listed as number 26 in the TV Guide article, 50 Greatest Cartoon Characters of All Time. A scene from the season four episode "Arthur's Big Hit" that depicts Arthur's clenched fist before he punched D.W. became an Internet meme. Arthur producer WGBH acknowledged the memes, but was dismayed due to their usage "outside of good taste." In 2025, the official Arthur Instagram account posted the fist meme around the same time that Executive Order 14290, which would end federal funding for PBS, was signed and made active. At the same time, the GBH online store began to stock merchandise featuring the fist meme.
