= Mind Your Manners =

Mind Your Manners may refer to:

- Mind Your Manners (film), a 1953 instructional short produced by Coronet Films
- "Mind Your Manners" (Chiddy Bang song) (2011)
- "Mind Your Manners" (Pearl Jam song) (2013)
- Mind Your Manners (TV series), a Netflix TV series featuring Sara Jane Ho

== Television episodes ==
- "Mind Your Manners" (Wimzie's House), a 1996 episode
- "Mind Your Manners" (Arthur), a 2007 episode
- "Mind Your Manners" (Jim Henson's Pajanimals), a 2013 episode

== See also ==
- Manners
- Politeness
