= Arthur season 10 =

Arthur
- Season 10
- DVD cover
- No. of episodes: 10 (19 segments)

Release
- Original network: PBS Kids Go!
- Original release: May 15 – May 26, 2006

Season chronology
- ← Previous; Season 9 Next → Season 11

The tenth season of the television series Arthur was originally produced in 2005 and broadcast on PBS Kids Go! in the United States from May 15 to May 26, 2006, and contains 10 episodes. The DVD set for the season was released in region 1 on March 25, 2008. This included downloadable teaching materials and described video for the visually impaired. The season's guest stars are Édgar Rentería, Mike Timlin, Johnny Damon, and Ming Tsai. This marks the final season in which Jason Szwimmer voices D.W. Read and the first season in which Tyler Brody-Stein voices Timmy Tibble (after having voiced his brother, Tommy Tibble, in the previous season), while Ryan Tilson voices Tommy. This is the second season of Arthur where the episodes aired in one month, following season 4.

2006 was marked as a 10-year milestone for the TV series Arthur and a 30-year milestone of the book series by Marc Brown. In celebration, a contest was run on the Arthur website called "Crazy 10's Scavenger Hunt", where viewers would search for hidden "10"s on the season's episodes for a chance to win a prize. The “10”s can also appear in the title cards themselves.

== Episodes ==
No. overall	No. in season	Title	Written by	Storyboard by	Original release date	Prod. code
126	1	"Happy Anniversary"	Peter K. Hirsch	Gerry Capelle & Elie Klimos	May 15, 2006	132A 133B
On Mr. and Mrs. Read's 10th anniversary, the family plan to go to a fancy restaurant; Arthur is supposed to go to Buster's house to sleep over, watch the Bionic Bunny 10th Anniversary Special and write a report about perspectives, and D.W. needs to find some tin as a gift. Their plans are thwarted when several mishaps occur: the Reads have to drive Grandpa Dave to a firefighter's ball, they get lost, and their car breaks down. The family stops at a nearby diner for help, where Arthur and D.W. have an argument that leads to them accidentally getting locked inside the storeroom. After the kids manage to escape, the entire Read family realize that just spending time together is as special as any planned celebration.
127a	2a	"The Squirrels"	Dietrich Smith	Jeremy O'Neill	May 16, 2006	128A
During a sleepover at the Baxters', Arthur and Buster watch a horror movie called The Squirrels (based on Alfred Hitchcock's film The Birds), and immediately become scared of squirrels. They learn that all of their friends (except Binky) have watched the movie, too, and everyone tries to conquer their fear by watching kiddie shows centered on squirrels. They get over their fear after Arthur and Buster rescue an injured squirrel.
127b	2b	"Fern and Persimmony Glitchet"	Stephanie Simpson	Elie Klimos & Ivan Tankushev	May 16, 2006	127B
Fern publishes her story, "Persimmony Glitchet" to the school newspaper under a pen name, but is worried when all of her friends dislike it.
128a	3a	"Desert Island Dish"	Daisy Scott	Jeremy O'Neill	May 17, 2006	126A
As the school year is almost over, Mr. Ratburn's class must find the one ideal food that each of them would choose if stranded on a desert island. The Brain researches many food items, and comes to the conclusion that a variety of foods is the best way to survive.
128b	3b	"The Secret About Secrets"	Stephanie Simpson	Stéfanie Gignac	May 17, 2006	133A
D.W. learns that her friend split his pants, but must keep it a secret, even when she is very tempted to tell people.
129a	4a	"Feeling Flush"	Glen Berger	Gerry Capelle	May 18, 2006	126B
Francine is worried that Elwood City is in a drought and is going to lose water, so she and Arthur bet to see who can conserve the most water.
129b	4b	"Family Fortune"	Joel Barkow & Stephanie Simpson	Jeremy O'Neill	May 18, 2006	130B
Arthur, D.W., and Grandma Thora search for something to bring to a television auction show.
130a	5a	"D.W. Aims High"	Rose Compagine	Gerry Capelle	May 19, 2006	130A
D.W. dreams of becoming an astronaut and being the first person to set foot on Mars, But the Tibbles try to scare her with myths about the planet.
130b	5b	"Flaw and Order"	Gentry Menzel	Stéfanie Gignac	May 19, 2006	127A
Buster and Arthur are falsely accused of breaking a cake plate that Mr. Read ordered. With help from their other friends, they manage to solve the case and find that it was a watch that got launched from a loose manhole cover that broke the plate.
131a	6a	"The Curse of the Grebes"	Stephanie Simpson	Elie Klimos & Jeremy O'Neill	May 22, 2006	135A
The Elwood City Grebes have made the World Championship, which they have not won since 1918. Buster begins to believe that he is out of luck for the team after attending three of the games, which they end up losing. Buster refuses to attend the final game, until he unexpectedly meets three of the Grebes' star players (voiced by Boston Red Sox players Édgar Rentería, Mike Timlin, and Johnny Damon), who encourage him to attend the final game, which he does, and the team ends up winning.
131b	6b	"Arthur Changes Gears"	Raye Lankford	Patricia Atchinson	May 22, 2006	128B
After purchasing a new bike, Arthur is hesitant in riding it for fear that he will get it dirty.
132a	7a	"Unfinished"	Dietrich Smith	Elie Klimos	May 23, 2006	131A
After finding an old novel titled 93 Million Miles in a Balloon, Arthur discovers that the final page of the book has been ripped out, so he tries to find out how the story ends.
132b	7b	"D.W., Bossy Boots"	Raye Lankford	Stéfanie Gignac	May 23, 2006	131B
D.W. is very bossy at Emily's birthday party and now, none of her friends wanna play with her until she has a fantasy that makes her discover her anger managing.
133a	8a	"Binky vs. Binky"	Raye Lankford	Patricia Atchinson	May 24, 2006	134A
Binky overcomes his fear of athletic competition when he takes up biking, and finds out that winning is not as important as finding the courage to continue. Note: This episode (along with its sister episode) was pulled from live TV in 2013 due to featuring a character named Vance Legstrong who is a parody of Lance Armstrong.
133b	8b	"Operation: D.W.!"	Stephanie Simpson	Jeremy O'Neill	May 24, 2006	134B
D.W. has a lack of hearing because her middle ears are gunky, so she has surgery to have tympanostomy tubes inserted, and is initially scared, so the other Reads help her and convince her to go through with the operation.
134a	9a	"Do You Speak George?"	Peter K. Hirsch	Stéfanie Gignac	May 25, 2006	135B
When everyone at school starts inventing their own languages, George tries to create one that is easy for everyone to use.
134b	9b	"World Girls"	Hilary Illick	Jeremy O'Neill	May 25, 2006	132B
Muffy, Sue Ellen, and Francine visit a brand new doll superstore called World Girl World. Muffy goes on a shopping spree in an attempt to complete her collection, Francine tries to find a doll she is interested in, and Sue Ellen tries to find an accessory for the only doll she owns.
135a	10a	"What's Cooking?"	Hilary Illick	Stéfanie Gignac	May 26, 2006	129A
A big cooking competition is coming up, and everyone is making a dish of their choice. When Arthur's chocolate cake is ruined, when he accidentally uses baking soda instead of baking powder, he then learns that making mistakes in cooking may lead to the creation of a new recipe: chocolate brownies. Guest star: Ming Tsai as himself.
135b	10b	"Buster's Special Delivery"	Cusi Cram	Elie Klimos	May 26, 2006	129B
Buster volunteers to deliver Lakewood's mail and finds out that this job is challenging work. When misplaced letters lead to cancelled field trips and stewed prunes for lunch, Buster is left holding the bag.
