= Arthur season 24 =

Season of television series

Arthur
- Season 24
- No. of episodes: 3 (5 segments)

Release
- Original network: PBS Kids
- Original release: March 8 – March 10, 2021

Season chronology
- ← Previous; Season 23 Next → Season 25

The twenty-fourth season of Arthur began airing on PBS Kids in the United States on March 8, 2021.

== Episodes ==
No. overall	No. in season	Title	Written by	Storyboard by	Original release date
247a	1a	"George Scraps His Sculpture"	Glen Berger	Karine Charlebois	March 10, 2021
George struggles to come up with ideas for a statue in an art show. Sculptor Kevin Sampson, appearing as himself, advises George to collect parts from the city dump for inspiration.
247b	1b	"Arthur's Big Meltdown"	Cliff Ruby & Elana Lesser	Gerry Capelle	March 10, 2021
When the Brain and Buster purposely spill Muffy’s spinach smoothie all over Arthur's new Bionic Bunny sneakers during an air hockey match, a furious Arthur loses his temper and inadvertently makes a mess of Muffy's game room. When rumors spread about the incident and his friends avoid him, Arthur seeks advice from D.W. on how to control himself.
248	2	"The Great MacGrady"	Peter K. Hirsch & Leah Ryan (uncredited)	Elie Klimos, Jeremy O’Neill, & Zhigang Wang	March 8, 2021
Mrs. MacGrady is diagnosed with cancer, and Arthur and D.W. rush to support her. Francine is worried, and Muffy is initially unaware of the severity of Mrs. MacGrady's condition, but jumps to action when she realizes how to help. Note: This is a remake of a season 13 of the same title that had been broadcast in 2009 but removed in 2013. Lance Armstrong was removed from the episode following his 2012 conviction in United States Anti-Doping Association v. Lance Armstrong, and further admission of erythropoietin (EPO) usage, which was common among professional cyclists of the era. See Doping at the Tour de France for explanation of EPO doping during that era.
249a	3a	"D.W.'s New Best Friend"	Peter Ferland	Tahir Rana & Dimitri Kostic	March 9, 2021
D.W. befriends a teenager and imitates her, straining her friendship with Bud.
249b	3b	"Freaky Tuesday"	Peter Ferland	Allan Jeffrey	March 9, 2021
Buster falls asleep in class and has a dream where he and Mr. Ratburn switch bodies after touching an electrified dish of spanakopita. Buster, in Mr. Ratburn's body, attempts to teach his class while Mr. Ratburn, in Buster's body, figures out how to reverse the effects.

== Production ==
Oasis Animation produced the 24th season of Arthur.
