= All Grown Up (disambiguation) =

All Grown Up! is an American animated television series.

All Grown Up may also refer to:

- All Grown Up, a 2016 album by Brokencyde
- All Grown Up, a 2017 novel by Jami Attenberg
- "All Grown Up", the series finale of Arthur
- "All Grown Up", a tagline used by WrestleMania 23
