= Strangers on a Train =

Strangers on a Train may refer to:

- Strangers on a Train (novel), Patricia Highsmith's novel
- Strangers on a Train (film), Alfred Hitchcock's adaptation of the novel
- Strangers on a Train (play), Craig Warner's play based on the novel
- Strangers on a Train (album), by The Left Banke
- "Strangers on a Train" (song), a 1980 song by The Sports
- "Strangers on a Train" (Shameless), an episode of American television comedy drama Shameless
- "Strangers on a Train", an episode from Arthur season 11
