= Best Day Ever (disambiguation) =

"Best Day Ever" is an episode of the animated television series SpongeBob SquarePants.

Best Day Ever or The Best Day Ever may also refer to:

- Best Day Ever (mixtape), a 2011 mixtape by Mac Miller
- The Best Day Ever, a 2006 SpongeBob SquarePants album
- Best Day Ever, a 2013 album by Rissi Palmer
- "Best Day Ever", a song by Blondie from the 2017 album Pollinator
- The Best Day Ever, an episode of the children's animated series Arthur
- "Best Day Ever!", a parade theme for the 2025 Tournament of Roses Parade.

== See also ==
- "This Is the Best Day Ever", a song by My Chemical Romance from the album I Brought You My Bullets, You Brought Me Your Love
