= Arthur season 25 =

Arthur
- Season 25
- No. of episodes: 4 (8 segments)

Release
- Original network: PBS Kids
- Original release: February 21, 2022

Season chronology
- ← Previous; Season 24

The twenty-fifth and final season of Arthur aired on PBS Kids in the United States on February 21, 2022. On July 27, 2021, executive producer Carol Greenwald announced that this would be the final season of Arthur for undisclosed reasons.

== Episodes ==
No. overall	No. in season	Title	Written by	Storyboard by	Original release date
250a	1a	"Binky Wrestles with a Story"	Jennifer Gibbs	Tahir Rana & Hélène Cossette	February 21, 2022
During a job-shadowing day, Binky follows Bitzi at the Elwood City Times, and Harry Mills (from "Bitzi's Beau" and "Bitzi's Break Up") teaches him how to write about mundane stories in an exciting way that will capture the reader's interest.
250b	1b	"All Will Be Revealed"	Greg Bailey	Jeremy O’Neill	February 21, 2022
Bud finally learns the real story behind how D.W.'s snowball (from "D.W.'s Snow Mystery" and "Return of the Snowball") disappeared from the freezer.
251a	2a	"Making Conversation"	Peter Ferland	Daniel Miodini & Hélène Cossette	February 21, 2022
George struggles to carry on conversations with adults, but when his mom brings him to a party, he meets a man with the same problem and makes a new friend.
251b	2b	"A Cloudy Day"	Jonathan Greenberg	Tahir Rana & Tom Nesbitt	February 21, 2022
Arthur and his friends see a silent movie at the Gaslight Theater when they are trapped inside during a rainstorm.
252a	3a	"Listen Up"	Peter K. Hirsch	Tom Cho & Hélène Cossette	February 21, 2022
When Muffy tries to console Francine after Bubby (from "Is That Kosher" and "Grandpa Dave's Memory Album") passes away, but fails to make her feel better, George teaches Muffy how to be a good listener.
252b	3b	"Arthur's New Old Vacation"	Peter Ferland	Allan Jeffrey	February 21, 2022
Arthur tries to convince his family to go to a theme park instead of their usual vacation spot, but discovers a new way to have fun when they end up back at the same old place.
253a	4a	"Blabbermouth"	Dietrich Smith	Jeremy O’Neill & Hélène Cossette	February 21, 2022
Buster's friendship with Arthur is strained over his inability to keep secrets.
253b	4b	"All Grown Up"	Peter K. Hirsch	Gerry Capelle & Tapani Knuutila	February 21, 2022
In the series' final segment, Arthur, Buster, Francine, and Muffy stumble across a board game in an old section of the library that predicts their future careers. However, the game gives vague answers and runs out of battery power before Arthur's future can be predicted. A patron at the library then recommends Arthur keep the book Ms. Turner accidentally gave him about how to draw animals, telling him how satisfying and successful the art industry can be. Twenty years later, Buster has become a college creative writing professor with Kate as a student; Francine runs a business selling tennis shoes; Muffy is running for Mayor of Elwood City; George owns the Sugar Bowl, which he has repurposed as the Sugar Bowl Café; Binky works as a TV weatherman; Bud returns to Elwood City, only to be ticketed by D.W., now in the police force; and Arthur is about to publish his own graphic novel based on his childhood, telling the story of his first pair of glasses (a reference to the show's first episode "Arthur's Eyes"). Note 1: Marc Brown, the creator of the Arthur franchise, voices the library patron who encourages Arthur to keep the animal drawing book. Note 2: Michael Yarmush, the first person to voice Arthur from seasons 1-5, voices Arthur as an adult in the final scene.

== Production ==
Oasis Animation produced the 25th season of Arthur.

All production of the season was completed by the end of 2019.
