= Arthur season 14 =

Arthur
- Season 14
- No. of episodes: 10 (20 segments)

Release
- Original network: PBS Kids Go!
- Original release: October 11, 2010 – April 28, 2011

Season chronology
- ← Previous; Season 13 Next → Season 15

The fourteenth season of the television series Arthur was originally broadcast on PBS Kids Go! in the United States from October 11, 2010 to April 29, 2011, and contains 10 episodes. Season 14 began screening at Israel in late August 2010 and on ABC2 of Australia on September 27, 2010. It has also screened in United Kingdom on CBBC since November 1, 2010. The second half started on Earth Day 2011 and ended the day before the Royal Wedding the next day.

This is the first season to feature Dakota Goyo and Jake Sim as the voices of Timmy and Tommy Tibble.

== Episodes ==
No. overall	No. in season	Title	Written by	Storyboard by	Original release date	Prod. code
166a	1a	"The Wheel Deal"	Raye Lankford	Daniel Miodini	October 11, 2010	177A
The Brain is put in a wheelchair after he injures his leg during basketball and copes with the encouragement of Lydia, a disabled girl who also uses a wheelchair.
166b	1b	"The Buster Report"	Ken Scarborough	Zhigang Wang & Lisa Whittick	October 11, 2010	177B
The class is assigned to do a report on someone they admire, and George picks Buster.
167a	2a	"The Agent of Change"	Gentry Menzel	Gerry Capelle	October 12, 2010	174A
After noticing the lack of female leads in movies, Francine, Muffy, and Molly set out to create their own movie.
167b	2b	"D.W. Unties the Knot"	P. Kevin Strader	Greg Hill	October 12, 2010	174B
After watching a reality program, D.W. plans her own dream wedding, but is confused when she is reminded that she needs someone to marry.
168a	3a	"Nicked by a Name"	Ken Pontac	Jim Craig & Rob Clarke	October 13, 2010	169A
The Brain starts to give people nicknames, but is frustrated when he is constantly asked for them.
168b	3b	"The Play's the Thing"	P. Kevin Strader	Chris Damboise, Jean-Marc Paradis & Dev Ramsaran	October 13, 2010	169B
The children abandon the playground to look at Muffy's new smart phone, and the Tough Customers are enraged that there is nobody to pick on. So they attempt to make the playground popular again.
169a	4a	"Falafelosophy"	David Steven Cohen & Peter K. Hirsch	Elise Benoît & François Brisson	October 25, 2010	184A
Sue Ellen goes to guest star Neil Gaiman's book signing, and he encourages her to write her own graphic novel. Although her friends are confused by her story, Neil Gaiman encourages her to keep writing. Note: This episode was pulled from re-runs (along with its sister episode) in 2024 due to allegations against Neil Gaiman.
169b	4b	"The Great Lint Rush"	Peter K. Hirsch	Louis Piché	October 25, 2010	184B
Pal loses all the socks in the Read's to a rich toad. To get them back, he and Amigo try to convince the toad that lint is more valuable than socks.
170a	5a	"Tales of Grotesquely Grim Bunny"	David Steven Cohen	Elise Benoît	October 29, 2010	176A
Arthur and Buster are pressured into reading a scary graphic novel.
170b	5b	"Pet Projects"	Scott Gray	Rob Clark	October 29, 2010	176B
Arthur, Francine, Buster, and Muffy make videos about Pal and Nemo, but to the pets' dismay, they aren't liking the results.
171a	6a	"Follow the Bouncing Ball"	Peter K. Hirsch	Ivan Tankushev	April 22, 2011	166A
Alberto loses his signed "El Boomerang" soccer ball, and it bounces all over town, especially knocking George's domino contraption over twice.
171b	6b	"Buster Baxter and the Letter from the Sea"	Mathayu Warren Lane & Peter K. Hirsch	Ivan Tankushev	April 22, 2011	166B
Buster finds a letter in a bottle and believes it is from sea people of Atlantis.
172a	7a	"Around the World in 11 Minutes"	Jonathan Greenberg	Louis Piché	April 25, 2011	167A
Pal, Amigo, Kate and Mei Lin take a trip around the world while competing with Nemo.
172b	7b	"Muffy and the Big Bad Blog"	Jonathan Greenberg	François Brisson	April 25, 2011	167B
Muffy becomes addicted to blogging after chronicling her holiday to Costa Rica on her blog. After Francine suggests she should spend less time blogging, the two begin feuding online.
173a	8a	"Arthur Unravels"	Susan Kim	François Brisson	April 26, 2011	171A
Grandma Thora teaches Arthur how to knit, but he is embarrassed about his new hobby.
173b	8b	"All the Rage"	Claudia Silver	Louis Piché & Al Jeffery	April 26, 2011	171B
Muffy tries to come up with fashion trends, but they don't catch on.
174a	9a	"D.W., Queen of the Comeback"	Peter K. Hirsch	Greg Hill	April 27, 2011	178B
After more teasing from the Tibbles, D.W. asks for advice on comebacks.
174b	9b	"In My Africa"	Ken Pontac	Gerry Capelle	April 27, 2011	178A
The Brain's African cousin from Senegal, Cheikh Powers, moves to Elwood City. After D.W. draws a picture with a misinterpretation of Africa, she, Brain, and Cheikh write their own duet educating about the countries of the continent.
175a	10a	"Buster Spaces Out"	Ron Holsey	François Brisson	April 28, 2011	179A
Buster decides to build a model rocket ship, and recruits Arthur, George, Carl, Francine, and Muffy to help him. Chaos ensues until he receives advice from guest star Michael Fincke.
175b	10b	"The Long Road Home"	Peter K. Hirsch	Louis Piché	April 28, 2011	179B
Thinking he performed badly in a running race, George decides to walk from Crown City to Elwood City to raise money for autism research. Arthur finds the El Boomerang soccer ball (from "Follow The Bouncing Ball") and plans to give it to Alberto on his birthday.

=== Australian air dates ===
Season 14 began screening on the Australian Broadcasting Corporation's iView service and ABC2 on September 27, 2010. The episode order does not agree with the list above, instead being listed in the series' original production order. The episodes that didn't air in the U.S. from October 2010 to April 2011 were aired as season 15.

No. overall	No. in season	Title	Australian air date
166	1	"Follow the Bouncing Ball" "Buster Baxter and the Letter From the Sea"	September 27, 2010
167	2	"Around the World in 11 Minutes" "Muffy and the Big Bad Blog"	September 28, 2010
168	3	"I Wanna Hold Your Hand" "Whistling in the Wind"	September 29, 2010
169	4	"Nicked by a Name" "The Play's the Thing"	September 30, 2010
170	5	"Buster's Garden of Grief" "Through the Looking Glasses"	October 1, 2010
171	6	"Arthur Unravels" "All the Rage"	October 2, 2010
172	7	"S.W.E.A.T." "To Eat or Not to Eat"	October 3, 2010
173	8	"Muffy's Classy Classics Club" "Best Enemies"	October 4, 2010
174	9	"The Agent of Change" "D.W. Unties the Knot"	October 5, 2010
175	10	"The Trouble With Trophies" "The Butler Did... What?"	October 6, 2010
176	11	"Tales of Grotesquely Grim Bunny" "Pet Projects"	October 7, 2010
177	12	"The Wheel Deal" "The Buster Report"	October 8, 2010
178	13	"In My Africa" "D.W., Queen of the Comeback"	October 9, 2010
179	14	"Buster Spaces Out" "The Long Road Home"	October 10, 2010
180	15	"Buster's Secret Admirer" "The Last King of Lambland"	October 11, 2010
181	16	"Fifteen"	October 12, 2010
182	17	"Buster the Lounge Lizard" "Cents-less"	October 13, 2010
183	18	"Grandpa Dave's Memory Album" "Buster's Carpool Catastrophe"	October 14, 2010
184	19	"Falafelosophy" "The Great Lint Rush"	October 15, 2010
185	20	"What's in a Name?" "Prunella the Packrat"	October 16, 2010

== Production ==
In September 2009, Cookie Jar Group confirmed production of this season and 185 episodes by 2010. Like season 12, this season produced 20 episodes for the broadcast span of two years (or television seasons). Because of this, many countries outside of the U.S. released the episodes earlier than scheduled for PBS.

Additionally, overseas this was the first season to be produced in 1080i HD (the previous two seasons were aired in widescreen in some markets but were still produced in 480i regardless of the aspect ratio), and was the first season to use previews for the episode on the title cards instead of the animated ones. In the US, the show continued to be aired in 480i and in the 4:3 aspect ratio, and still used the animated title cards up until season 16.

=== All Kids Can Character Search ===
In January 2009, WGBH and CVS Caremark announced a character design contest for children aged 6 – 12. The contest was designed to educate children about the importance of inclusion and how children of all abilities can play together. Entries required an illustration and description of a character with a disability. Jacqui Deegan, senior director of Arthur comments, "We're looking for an exciting new character, who can show the gang in Elwood City that children come in all shapes, sizes and abilities. Over the years, ARTHUR has helped children to embrace other kids' unique characteristics as well as their own, and this new character will continue that tradition." The contest ran from February 1, 2009, to March 31, 2009, and the winner was announced in June 2009. Connor Gordon's character, Lydia Fox, was featured on the season premiere, "The Wheel Deal."
