= Arthur season 15 =

Arthur
- Season 15
- No. of episodes: 10 (19 segments)

Release
- Original network: PBS Kids Go!
- Original release: October 10, 2011 – June 15, 2012

Season chronology
- ← Previous; Season 14 Next → Season 16

The fifteenth season of the television series Arthur was originally broadcast on PBS Kids Go! in the United States from October 10, 2011, to June 15, 2012, and contains 10 episodes, all of which are from the season 14 production, which have previously aired in other countries. This is the last season featuring Dallas Jokic, Robert Naylor, Lyle O'Donohoe, Dakota Goyo, and Alexina Cowan as the respective voices of Arthur Read, D.W. Read, Alain "Brain" Powers, Timmy Tibble, and Catherine Frensky. This is also the final season to be produced by Cookie Jar Entertainment, animated with traditional animation, and air in 4:3 in the US. In the next season, 9 Story Media Group produces this series and the show switches to Flash animation and would also be the first season in the US to air in the 1080i widescreen format where it was previously only done in foreign markets.

== Episodes ==
No. overall	No. in season	Title	Written by	Storyboard by	Original release date	Prod. code
176	1	"Fifteen"	Jonathan Greenberg	Daniel Miodini & Greg Hill	October 10, 2011	181
George appears on a radio quiz show to earn money for his school. Arthur forgets his class report on Michelangelo Buonarroti, which helps his class get a no-homework day, and after overhearing, Pal and Kate try to help get it to him. They find a postcard with a picture of the Mona Lisa on it, thinking that it is part of the report. However, Nemo steals the postcard and Nadine informs the two that the picture is part of a formula to get rid of imaginary friends. Pal then tries to get the picture back from Nemo. Note: This episode celebrates Arthur's 15th season and year.
177a	2a	"I Wanna Hold Your Hand"	Raye Lankford	Daniel Miodini	October 11, 2011	168A
On a trip to the mall, Binky is caught with the uncoolest things in the world. He is embarrassed about being seen holding his mother's hand, and threatens George not to tell anyone.
177b	2b	"Whistling in the Wind"	Dietrich Smith	Elise Benoît	October 11, 2011	168B
Timmy is frustrated when he finds out that Tommy can whistle, but he can't.
178a	3a	"Buster's Secret Admirer"	Allan Neuwirth & Peter K. Hirsch	Elise Benoît	October 12, 2011	180A
Buster receives a box of chocolates in the mail from a "secret admirer" and it's driving him crazy. He tries to find out who it is, asking everyone from Arthur to Molly.
178b	3b	"The Last King of Lambland"	Tolon Brown	Robert Yap	October 12, 2011	180B
James receives a stuffed toy lamb from his uncle in Scotland. He thinks that the toy will give him special powers, but his classmates decline it when the Tibbles treat him like a king because of it. Note: This episode was written by Tolon Brown, the series' creative producer and son of Arthur creator Marc Brown.
179a	4a	"Cents-less"	Scott Gray	Gerry Capelle	October 13, 2011	182A
Mr. Ratburn decides it's time for his class to learn a little about dollars and cents. For the entire weekend, nobody can spend their moolah. Not even one.
179b	4b	"Buster the Lounge Lizard"	Raye Lankford	Rob Clark	October 13, 2011	182B
Buster has a new electronic car, the “Dark Bunny Dark Buggy,” complete with a grappling hock and intercom commands. But the car goes into the teacher's lounge, and he must get it back with Binky's help.
180a	5a	"To Eat or Not to Eat"	Ken Pontac	Rob Clark, Karine Charlebois & Guy Lamoureux	October 14, 2011	172B
Buster investigates a new candy bar when his classmates become hyperactive after eating it, as the main ingredient reveals to be Tri-Enzomated Zorn Jelly. When Buster shows the candy to Bitzi, she doesn't want the same thing to happen to him.
180b	5b	"S.W.E.A.T."	Claudia Silver	Daniel Miodini & Lisa Whittick	October 14, 2011	172A
Mr. Ratburn's Class is stressed about their upcoming S.W.E.A.T. aptitude tests. Sue Ellen panics that she doesn't have any #2 (HB) pencils, the Brain worries he will do badly after he accidentally skips a question on the practice test, and Arthur struggles to find a place to study quietly.
181a	6a	"Grandpa Dave's Memory Album"	Ken Scarborough	François Brisson	June 15, 2012	183A
Grandpa Dave is moving closer to the Reads. But he has a very bad memory and forgets all sorts of things, so Arthur and D.W. try to help him.
181b	6b	"Buster's Carpool Catastrophe"	Elliott Thomson	Tapani Knuutila, Jean Lajeunesse & Rob Clark	June 15, 2012	183B
Muffy, Arthur, and Buster carpool to their cooking class, but the trio doesn't get along well.
182a	7a	"Prunella the Packrat"	Guy Lancaster & Peter K. Hirsch	Daniel Miodini & François Brisson	April 16, 2012	185A
Prunella saves everything and she and Arthur are assigned to work together for the upcoming Earth Day fair at school, but Arthur learns that Prunella has kept several beloved items (including an old sock and birthday cards) over the years and they have been piling up in her closet. While Arthur and Rubella try to help Prunella learn to let go, she resists and still tries to save what she can.
182b	7b	"What's in a Name?"	John Marsh	Gerry Capelle & Robert Yap	April 16, 2012	185B
After Muffy gets a weeklong timeout from recess for using her phone during Binky's speech in class, she learns that Binky's real name is "Shelley", and plans to get revenge by uncovering his secret to the whole class. Binky is very upset about having a "girl's name" until Mrs. Barnes tells him a story about how his great grandfather, Shelley Barnes, saved a circus. Afterward, Binky shares the tale with the class, much to their amazement.
183a	8a	"Muffy's Classy Classics Club"	Susan Kim	Jean Lajeunesse, Patrick Boutin & Gerry Capelle	May 23, 2012	173A
Muffy buys the entire Pretty Pioneers collection and starts a book club with Arthur, Francine, and the Brain, but refuses to read any other books the others suggest after her own suggestions prove unpopular.
183b	8b	"Best Enemies"	Jonathan Greenberg	Jean-Marc Paradis & Alex Greychuck	May 23, 2012	173B
Mrs. Read's new client has a daughter D.W.'s age named W.D. However, D.W. and W.D. are complete opposites and don't get along well. After learning that the family has been invited to spend the week at W.D.'s house, the two girls come up with an idea to end the visit short.
184a	9a	"Buster's Garden of Grief"	Dietrich Smith	Gerry Capelle	May 24, 2012	170A
Fritz puts Buster in charge of the community garden for a few weeks until his broken ankle heals, but it proves to be too much for just one person. When Buster is gone on a trip, he must ask Arthur's friends to take care of the garden for him.
184b	9b	"Through the Looking Glasses"	Pennel Bird	Jeremy O'Neill, Jean-Luc Trudel & Patrick Boutin	May 24, 2012	170B
Arthur's old glasses (from "Arthur's Eyes") are gone, and he has to get a new pair. He receives praise for them, causing his attention to go straight into his head, which nearly costs him his friendship with Buster.
185a	10a	"The Butler Did... What?"	Wolfram Breuer	François Brisson	May 25, 2012	175B
After Bailey goes missing, Muffy discovers a series of clues and wonders who exactly IS Bailey. She realizes that she doesn't know anything about him when she tries to find him.
185b	10b	"The Trouble With Trophies"	Cusi Cram	Louis Piché & Guy Lamoureux	May 25, 2012	175A
After George wins an award for Most Improved Student, Muffy tries to get Fern to admit that she wants a trophy too. It turns out that Fern couldn't care less about victory.
