= Arthur season 12 =

Arthur
- Season 12
- No. of episodes: 10 (20 segments)

Release
- Original network: PBS Kids Go!
- Original release: October 6, 2008 – April 24, 2009

Season chronology
- ← Previous; Season 11 Next → Season 13

The twelfth season of the television series Arthur was originally broadcast on PBS Kids Go! in the United States from October 6, 2008, to April 24, 2009, and contains 10 episodes. The 10 episodes listed below were broadcast as season 12, and the other 10 were broadcast as season 13. This resulted all of season 13 episodes airing in several countries such as Canada and United Kingdom for many months prior the U.S. broadcast. This season was created and originally aired in the 16:9 widescreen format in non-US markets though still in 480i; in the U.S., they were and continued to be aired in 4:3, with the left and right sides cropped out. The animation was produced by Animation Services HK Ltd. instead of by AKOM. This was the first season where two seasons (12 & 13 in this case) were now produced simultaneously. This was also the first season where Michael Hirsh was credited as the executive producer.

Joan Rivers guest starred as Francine's grandmother and Camel on the season's premiere episode "Is That Kosher?". Lance Armstrong guest starred in the episode "Room to Ride" as himself. Dallas Jokic, Lyle O'Donohoe, Chris Lortie, and Jake Roseman take over the voices of Arthur Read, Alan "Brain" Powers, and Timmy and Tommy Tibble, replacing Cameron Ansell, Paul-Stuart Brown, Tyler Brody-Stein, and Ryan Tilson, respectively. Additionally, Samantha Reynolds temporarily replaces Eleanor Noble as the voice of George Lundgren before Noble's return in season 14.

== Episodes ==
| No. overall | No. in season | Title | Written by | Storyboard by | Original release date | Prod. code |
|---|---|---|---|---|---|---|
| 146a | 1a | "Is That Kosher?" | Allan Neuwirth | Robert Yap | October 6, 2008 | 147A |
Francine's grandmother, Bubby Frensky, visits for a Jewish holiday, Yom Kippur. Francine tries to fast 24 hours that day, but is tempted when Arthur has a pizza party. Guest star: Joan Rivers
| 146b | 1b | "Never, Never, Never" | Dietrich Smith | Gerry Capelle | October 6, 2008 | 146A |
After being asked by Mrs. Read to part with a few toys, D.W. gives all of her toys to someone who "really loves her": the Tibbles.
| 147a | 2a | "Room to Ride" | Martha Atwater, Ken Olshansky & Peter K. Hirsch | Ivan Tankushev | October 13, 2008 | 146B |
Wanting more freedom to ride, Binky, Arthur, Buster, and the Brain take to the streets and start a campaign to convince Elwood City to build more bike lanes. As all is lost, Binky gets a helping hand from Lance Armstrong. Note: This episode (along with its sister episode) was pulled from live TV in 2012 due to controversy over Lance Armstrong. Guest star: Lance Armstrong as himself.
| 147b | 2b | "The Frensky Family Fiasco" | Peter K. Hirsch | Nick Vallinakis | October 13, 2008 | 147B |
When Francine fears that her family is breaking apart, she proposes a weekly "Frensky Family Night", but nobody can agree on which activity to do and spending quality time together soon turns out to be harder than Francine expected.
| 148a | 3a | "D.W.'s Stray Netkitten" | Matt Steinglass | Gerry Capelle | October 20, 2008 | 148A |
D.W. is panicked when a scary clown computer virus attacks Mrs. Read's computer. She asks Arthur and Emily to take care of her netkitten, Tickly, but is she really ready to relinquish control?
| 148b | 3b | "Bats in the Belfry" | Susan Kim | Elise Benoît, Elie Klimos & Jeremy O'Neill | October 20, 2008 | 148B |
Arthur and D.W. are thrilled when Grandma Thora lets them turn her attic into a clubhouse. They have Buster for a visit and each has their own fantasy vision of what it should look like... but their war is interrupted by a live bat, Can the trio appreciate their unwanted visitor?
| 149a | 4a | "For the Birds" | Susan Kim | Ivan Tankushev | October 27, 2008 | 151A |
The Brain dreams of being the first to spot a rare bird species, the "green-tailed grebe". As Mr. Ratburn hosts a bird-watching club at Lakewood, the Brain is anxious that someone else will find the grebe first and ruin his chances at fame and fortune. Luckily, he learns that nature is a gift for everyone to share.
| 149b | 4b | "Ungifted" | Joe Purdy | Gerry Capelle & Michel Carbonneau | October 27, 2008 | 149B |
When Arthur trades away one of Buster's gifts, Buster is enraged and Arthur has to apologize to him before things go worse.
| 150a | 5a | "The Chronicles of Buster" | Dietrich Smith | Ivan Tankushev & Jeremy O'Neill | November 3, 2008 | 152B |
Buster is addicted to the extended DVD version of "The Chronicles of Ahmayzzia" with 1,001 hours of behind-the-scenes footage. He is so engrossed that he neglects his training for a rock-climbing trip. After jeopardizing his relationship with Arthur, Buster learns that special effects can't take place of hard work when conquering real mountains.
| 150b | 5b | "On This Spot" | Dietrich Smith | Daniel Decelles | November 3, 2008 | 152A |
Arthur is thrilled when he learns that Sitting Bull once passed through Elwood City as part of Buffalo Bill's Wild West Show. He rallies the citizens to mark the spot of a legend's visit with a monument, but is dismayed when his friends care more about celebrity sightings than local history.
| 151a | 6a | "The Cherry Tree" | Leah Ryan | Daniel Miodini, Nick Vallinakis & Sylvie Lafrance | April 20, 2009 | 155A |
Muffy will do everything to have a bouncy castle at her upcoming party, but she is upset when her favorite cherry tree is chopped down to make room for it. Then to make matters worse, she learns that cutting down trees harms the environment.
| 151b | 6b | "Matchmaker, Match Breaker" | Allan Neuwirth | Zhigang Wang | April 20, 2009 | 155B |
Francine and Muffy scheme to set up Chip and Catherine by playing matchmaker for them, thinking if they marry, the two of them will become sisters. But plans go awry and neither can agree on merging families.
| 152a | 7a | "War of the Worms" | Gentry Menzel | Elise Benoît, Elie Klimos, Zhigang Wang & Sylvie Lafrance | April 21, 2009 | 151B |
The Brain is always taking the fun out of Fern's storytelling by correcting her facts. Fern teaches the Brain a lesson by spinning a tall tale that he can't help but recognize. Things go out of whack when she convinces him there are giant worms attacking Elwood City.
| 152b | 7b | "I Owe You One" | Dietrich Smith | Daniel Decelles | April 21, 2009 | 149A |
Buster is always asking Arthur for favors, but he is anxious that he has to repay all of them at once. So he goes on a frenzy, helping everyone whom Arthur owes a favor to in hopes of escaping from the debt.
| 153a | 8a | "The Blackout" | Cusi Cram | Jeremy O'Neill, Daniel Miodini & Nadja Cozic | April 22, 2009 | 161A |
It's the hottest day in Elwood City as another terrible power outage threatens the entire neighborhood. The Reads get advice from the Molinas on how to withstand the heat and enjoy life even under the toughest weather conditions.
| 153b | 8b | "Mei Lin Takes a Stand" | Peter K. Hirsch | Nick Vallinakis | April 22, 2009 | 161B |
Mei Lin (from "Big Brother Binky") isn't keen on learning to walk and would rather stick to crawling. Sale and Pepe (from "Flea to Be, You and Me") share a tale of a little princess in the land of Hanzan-Niis, who learns to walk in order to serve her beloved court jester. Will Mei Lin be inspired to take her stand?
| 154a | 9a | "Home Sweet Home" | Peter K. Hirsch | Gerry Capelle | April 23, 2009 | 156A |
Buster reluctantly attends summer camp, anxious that he won't know anyone. But equipped with stories of summer camp battles and triumphs from Fritz (from "Buster's Green Thumb"), Buster realizes that it's simple to make new friends.
| 154b | 9b | "Do You Believe in Magic?" | Jonathan Greenberg | Daniel Decelles | April 23, 2009 | 156B |
Arthur feels jealous when Buster's magic tricks outshine his own. With Buster hired as a magician for D.W.'s birthday party, Arthur is tempted to show the kids that Buster’s tricks aren't so magical.
| 155a | 10a | "The Perfect Game" | Elliot Thomson | Jeremy O'Neill & Daniel Miodini | April 24, 2009 | 162A |
Francine is excited for Mr. Ratburn's coolest assignment yet he's asked them to design their very own model cities. From minarets to fancy lights, Francine got plenty of good ideas by making her own baseball stadium. But as the deadline looms, she is addicted to making everything perfect, that she can't seem to get the model complete in time.
| 155b | 10b | "D.W.'s Furry Freak-out" | David Steven Cohen | Elie Klimos & Élise Benoît | April 24, 2009 | 162B |
A kitty finds its way to D.W., and she is accepted into the Read's. But the kitty soon turns out to be a lot more than a mortified D.W. expected and wreaks havoc all over her life, especially seeing an advertisement for a horror film. When Dr. Fugue (from "Arthur Plays the Blues" and "Tipping the Scales") receives the kitty back as he is her main owner, D.W. isn't brave for a pet after all.
