= Arthur season 11 =

Arthur
- Season 11
- No. of episodes: 10 (19 segments)

Release
- Original network: PBS Kids Go!
- Original release: June 25 – September 7, 2007

Season chronology
- ← Previous; Season 10 Next → Season 12

The eleventh season of the television series Arthur was originally broadcast on PBS Kids Go! in the United States from June 25 to September 7, 2007, and contains 10 episodes. This is the last season to feature Cameron Ansell, Paul-Stuart Brown, Tyler Brody-Stein, and Ryan Tilson as the voices of Arthur Read, Alan "Brain" Powers, and Timmy and Tommy Tibble, respectively; Ansell would later return to voice the new character Rafi in season 16. It is also the first season to feature Robert Naylor as the voice of D.W. Read, replacing Jason Szwimmer.

== Episodes ==
No. overall	No. in season	Title	Written by	Storyboard by	Original release date	Prod. code
136a	1a	"Swept Away"	Peter K. Hirsch	Jean Lacombe	June 25, 2007	137A
Arthur, D.W., and Buster are spending a few days at the beach. There, they discover the simple joys of building sandcastles. But endless tidal waves hit shore as they try to make their perfect and sandy masterpieces.
136b	1b	"Germophobia"	Dietrich Smith	Elie Klimos, Elise Benoît & Nick Vallinakis	June 25, 2007	137B
Arthur's friends are fed up with Buster's sloppy habits, but they have gone too far when Buster develops mysophobia and starts seeing germs everywhere.
137a	2a	"Arthur Sells Out"	Raye Lankford	Ivan Tankushev	June 26, 2007	136A
Arthur is willing to have the newly released video game, "Revenge of the Moomies". He tries to sell his old toys to save plenty of money for the game, but will he lie about how great his toys are to earn an allowance for something he wants?
137b	2b	"Mind Your Manners"	P. Kevin Strader	Robert Yap & Nick Vallinakis	June 26, 2007	142B
Upon realizing that they forget about Grandparents Day, the Tibbles decide to surprise their grandmother by taking her out to dinner, but she would rather stay home. But their table manners have something to do with her turning down their invitation.
138a	3a	"Buenas Noches, Vicita"	Cusi Cram	Gerry Capelle	June 27, 2007	136B
Vicita loses her favorite book so she can't sleep. Arthur and D.W. try to cheer her up by re-writing their own version of the book.
138b	3b	"Prunella Packs It In"	Susan Kim	Elie Klimos, Elise Benoît & Jean Lajeunesse	June 27, 2007	139B
An anxious Prunella discovers that college is for well-rounded students. Without tuition to offer a prospective program, she piles on extracurricular activities. Can Prunella crack under the heavy load?
139a	4a	"Phony Fern"	Peter K. Hirsch	Gerry Capelle	June 28, 2007	138B
Fern gets a Portilex cell phone for emergencies, but is addicted to it with severe texts and calls from Muffy. When the phone's battery dies, Fern drops the device onto a crosswalk and a truck runs it over.
139b	4b	"Brain's Shocking Secret"	Glen Berger	Stéfanie Gignac	June 28, 2007	138A
Everyone knows that the Brain is the smartest kid in class. What they don't know is that he got held back in kindergarten, and the reason why: he was not yet fully emotionally developed. That's a fact the Brain would like to keep as a secret.
140a	5a	"Baby Kate and the Imaginary Mystery"	Peter K. Hirsch	Elie Klimos & Elise Benoît	June 29, 2007	141B
When Nadine is missing, Kate and Pal try to find out where she went, suspecting that the Tibbles have kidnapped her.
140b	5b	"Strangers on a Train"	Gentry Menzel	Gerry Capelle	June 29, 2007	140B
During a weekend trip to Crown City, Sue Ellen finds a diary on an old train and wonders who it belongs to.
141a	6a	"The Making of Arthur"	Peter K. Hirsch	Jeremy O'Neill	September 3, 2007	145B
Matt Damon guest stars in animated form as a presenter of Arthur's favorite TV program, "Postcards from You". His character asks viewers to send in homemade movies, which sparks a craze amongst Arthur and his friends.
141b	6b	"Dancing Fools"	Cusi Cram	Stéfanie Gignac & Nick Vallinakis	September 3, 2007	144A
Mrs. Molina is teaching a dance class for the students as Francine and George are paired together. Who would have guessed that George and Francine could be the next Fred and Ginger?
142a	7a	"Hic or Treat"	Kathy Waugh	Robert Yap	September 4, 2007	144B
It's Halloween in Elwood City and D.W. has the hiccups again (from "Arthur vs. the Piano"). As it continues, none of the other Reads remedy work, she miserably contemplates spending the rest of her life with her hiccups, so Arthur helps her cure them before going trick-or-treating.
142b	7b	"Mr. Alwaysright"	Peter K. Hirsch	Jeremy O'Neill	September 4, 2007	143A
An annoyed Buster blames the Brain for being right about everything, he'll screw up eventually and Buster pesters him until he finally gets something wrong.
143a	8a	"Francine's Pilfered Paper"	Raye Lankford	Jean Lacombe, Ivan Tankushev & Robert Yap	September 5, 2007	139A
It's Thanksgiving in Elwood City and Mr. Ratburn assigns his class to write essays about different Thanksgiving topics. Francine cheats by plagiarizing an essay off the Internet about Pilgrim cuisine. When she learns that plagiarism is illegal, she rewrites her assignment and confesses to Mr. Ratburn what she did.
143b	8b	"Buster Gets Real"	Dietrich Smith	Elie Klimos & Elise Benoît	September 5, 2007	143B
Everyone that is, is into the new supermarket reality show on TV, except for Arthur. When Buster quits watching Bionic Bunny and is addicted to the new series, Arthur is anxious that their friendship will be over permanently.
144a	9a	"D.W. on Ice"	Raye Lankford	Jean Lacombe & Robert Yap	September 6, 2007	141A
D.W. tells her playgroup friends about her perfect skills at ice skating. The truth is, she can barely stand on ice. Due to the upcoming part of Emily's skating party, will D.W.'s friends find out that she is lying?
144b	9b	"Spoiled Rotten!"	Peter K. Hirsch & Wolfram Breuer	Stéfanie Gignac	September 6, 2007	140A
Accused of being spoiled by her friends, Muffy sets about to prove them wrong by being the most charitable person around, but Francine is unimpressed by Muffy's token efforts. Finally, a used clothing store helps Muffy discover her true talents, and the true meaning of charity.
145	10	"Big Brother Binky"	Stephanie Simpson	Stéfanie Gignac, Elie Klimos & Elise Benoît	September 7, 2007	142A 145A
Binky is excited when Mr. and Mrs. Barnes decide to adopt a Chinese baby girl whom they name her Mei Lin. The thought of a baby sister makes Binky relieved, until he realizes there are some changes in store. A year later, the Barnes' travel to China to meet Mei Lin. Binky then realizes that not only having a sister in their house is harder than he thinks, but also that being a big brother has its own rewards too.
