= The Great MacGrady =

- Arthur episode
- Episode no.: Season 13; Episode 1
- Directed by: Greg Bailey
- Written by: Peter Hirsch; Leah Ryan
- Production code: 1301
- Original air date: October 19, 2009

Guest appearance
- Lance Armstrong

Episode chronology
← Previous "D.W.'s Furry Freakout"	Next → "The Silent Treatment"
- Arthur season 13

"The Great MacGrady"
- Arthur episode
- Episode no.: Season 24; Episode 2
- Directed by: Greg Bailey
- Written by: Peter Hirsch; Leah Ryan (uncredited)
- Production code: 2402
- Original air date: March 8, 2021

Episode chronology
← Previous "Arthur's Big Meltdown"	Next → "D.W.'s New Best Friend"
- Arthur season 24

"The Great MacGrady" is the first episode of the 13th season of Arthur, which aired October 19, 2009. The episode tackles the difficult topic of cancer and features cancer survivor and cyclist Lance Armstrong. Following Armstrong's doping case, the episode was removed from rotation, and Armstrong's character was replaced with a generic "Uncle Slam" before the episode was re-released under the same title in the 24th season.

== Plot ==
The school's beloved lunch lady, Mrs. MacGrady, is not at school. Instead, her nephew Skip Bitterman fills in despite lacking in cooking skills. After about a week, Mr. Ratburn reveals that Mrs. MacGrady is on leave because she has cancer.

The students all react differently to the news. Muffy doesn't entirely grasp the situation, and stays optimistic while she shops for her father's birthday presents. Francine, who lost her grandfather to cancer, starts acting out in various ways, including intentionally losing a soccer game because it won't make Mrs. MacGrady feel any better. Arthur and D.W. deliver homemade chicken noodle soup to Mrs. MacGrady.

At Mr. Crosswire's birthday, Muffy laments about Francine being too sad to help her shop for a proper gift. Her father explains that Francine is just upset about Mrs. MacGrady's illness and encourages her to visit Mrs. MacGrady and maybe bring her a care package.

Francine stays home after having a nightmare that Mrs. MacGrady will never return to work. After school, she's visited by Binky and Buster, who are planning to bring gifts to Mrs. MacGrady and invite Francine to come along. Francine declines, but before they leave, Binky tries to cheer her up by giving her the email address of Lance Armstrong (professional wrestler Uncle Slam in the revised edition), which he got after meeting him at the Elwood City Bike-A-Thon. He explains to a surprised Francine that Armstrong (Uncle Slam) had cancer two years ago and encourages her to write to him. Francine reluctantly does so, but to her and her friends' surprise, he writes back and offers to meet with her when he visits Elwood City the following week. Muffy, who is planning on visiting Mrs. MacGrady, offers to bring Francine along so she can share the news, but Francine again refuses to visit.

Muffy arrives just as Arthur and D.W. deliver more gifts to Mrs. MacGrady, including more jars of chicken noodle soup and a giant stuffed bear. Muffy compliments Mrs. MacGrady's bandana, only to learn Mrs. MacGrady is wearing it as she has lost her hair from the chemotherapy treatment. After Arthur and D.W. leave, Muffy takes a moment to apologize for being insensitive about Mrs. MacGrady's illness. Mrs. MacGrady replies that cancer is difficult, but she assures Muffy that she intends to get better.

Armstrong (Uncle Slam) arrives in Elwood City and goes for a walk in the park with Francine. He talks to her about how he got through his cancer diagnosis through medicine and the support of his biking (wrestling) community. Francine expresses her surprise that someone of Armstrong's (Uncle Slam's) stature could get diagnosed with cancer, but he tells her it can happen to anyone, and that his doctors were unsure about his survival rate. However, Armstrong pulled through and made his return to biking (Uncle Slam made his return to wrestling with a Cancer Benefit Wrestling Tournament to raise money and awareness of the disease). This gives Francine a similar idea to hold a cancer benefit bike race, "Pedal for a Cure".

Muffy returns to Mrs. MacGrady's house just as her sister Martha is taking her to a doctor's appointment. Noticing the state of the house, Muffy offers to wash the dishes while they're gone, but has trouble doing so. When Arthur and D.W. arrive with more gifts, Muffy points out there are different ways of helping than just bringing gifts. So they join Muffy in cleaning up the entire house, leaving a note for Mrs. MacGrady when she returns, assuring her that they're her "support team".

The "Pedal for a Cure" is a huge success. At the finish line, Francine apologizes to Mrs. MacGrady for not visiting. Mrs. MacGrady assures her she understands, remarking it can be frightening to see someone you care about when they're sick.

After more than a month of Skip's terrible meals, Buster and the rest of the students almost start a revolt, as that day's lunch looks like a sponge. Buster goes up to ask what that lunch is, with Skip replying that it is "A little bit of this, a little bit of that. I call it, Whatchamacooking." Their uprising is thwarted by the return of Mrs. MacGrady—while not totally cancer-free, she's at least healthy enough to return to work. Skip claims that "cooking is not for me, I'll stick to banking." Buster corrects his school lunch almanac with a prediction that the food will be unknown, but will taste great.

== Reception ==
"The Great MacGrady" is a rare instance of children's television media focusing on the topic of a cancer diagnosis. Before this, Why, Charlie Brown, Why? was one previous example of a children's television program about the sensitive topic, released in 1990.

It received positive praise from most critics.

The episode aired reruns on PBS until 2012, when it was pulled from the national schedule rotation, coincident with the Lance Armstrong doping case. It was also removed from many streaming platforms. A revised edition of the episode was released in 2021 as part of Arthur's 24th season. The plot remains essentially identical to the original, except all references to Lance Armstrong are substituted with an in-universe professional wrestler named Uncle Slam Wilson, a minor background character previously established in the series. The episode was re-animated using the same animation studio for the remainder of Season 24, and all voice work was redubbed by modern voice actors for the season. On some cable and television providers, the Season 24 episode is listed in the episode listing and the info sections as the season 13 episode.
