= Arthur season 13 =

Arthur
- Season 13
- No. of episodes: 10 (19 segments)

Release
- Original network: PBS Kids Go!
- Original release: October 12, 2009 – April 9, 2010

Season chronology
- ← Previous; Season 12 Next → Season 14

The thirteenth season of the television series Arthur was originally broadcast on PBS Kids Go! in the United States from October 12, 2009, to April 9, 2010, and contains 10 episodes. All episodes from this season aired on several countries outside the U.S., such as CBBC in United Kingdom and TVOKids in Canada, prior to their U.S. air dates.

It is the last season to feature Samantha Reynolds, Chris Lortie, and Jake Roseman as the voices of George Lundgren and Timmy and Tommy Tibble, respectively.

== Episodes ==
No. overall	No. in season	Title	Written by	Storyboard by	Original release date	Prod. code
156	1	"The Great MacGrady"	Peter K. Hirsch & Leah Ryan	Zhigang Wang	October 19, 2009	163B 164B
Mrs. MacGrady is diagnosed with cancer, and the children react differently: Arthur and D.W. rush to support her, Francine is worried, and Muffy is initially unaware of the severity of Mrs. MacGrady's condition, but jumps to action when she realizes how to help. Lance Armstrong guest stars for the second time in the series but is replaced in a remake of this episode in Season 24. Note: This episode was dedicated to the loving memory of Leah Ryan. This episode was pulled from live TV in 2012 due to controversy over Lance Armstrong happening shortly after this episode was released and in its place is the Season 24 remake of the same episode.
157a	2a	"The Silent Treatment"	Claudia Silver	Robert Yap	October 13, 2009	153B
Being silent, a shy George wonders if any of Arthur's friends notice him, and he has a great idea: he decides to remain that way until being noticed. When Arthur's friends throw a party as soon as they finally notice silent George, it backfires when they need to avoid him while planning the event.
157b	2b	"Kung Fool"	Claudia Silver	Robert Yap	October 13, 2009	163A
Fern volunteers to help an elderly Asian neighbor, Tony Wu, with his household chores and she learns is a retired kung fu master. Fern then imagines being a student and she becomes a kung fu master herself.
158a	3a	"Arthur's Number Nightmare"	Peter K. Hirsch	Elie Klimos & Élise Benoît	October 14, 2009	154B
When Arthur's friends discover what looks like a class-ranking list in Mr. Haney's office, they are all in for a big surprise. If Arthur's really #2, he must be really smart. #11 for Buster is his new lucky number, but there must be a way for Francine to move up a rank. Fortunately, all numbers come to mean much more than they should to all the Lakewood students on the list.
158b	3b	"Brain Gets Hooked"	Matt Steinglass	Aliaksei Kazakou & Michel Carbonneau	October 14, 2009	154A
The Brain gets hooked on a latest tween reality series, "Junior Island". When he starts to avoid his friends and fall behind on his schoolwork, he knows he's got a problem. With Fern's help, the Brain gets over his addiction by skipping to the final episode of the show.
159a	4a	"MacFrensky"	Jonathan Greenberg	Michel Carbonneau & Stéfanie Gignac	October 15, 2009	159A
Francine is in the lead for Student of the Month until the Brain did several good deeds that put him ahead of her. Muffy persuades Francine into framing the Brain for stealing Buster's alien toy, so Francine can take back the lead. The scheme works, but Arthur and Buster don't think the Brain stole Buster's toy, and the girls frame them for cheating on a test in anxiety of being caught from their first scheme.
159b	4b	"The Good, the Bad, and the Binky"	Claudia Silver	Gerry Capelle	October 15, 2009	159B
As Binky babysits Emily for a day, he introduces his charge to the world of professional wrestling and teaches her some fierce moves. But when Emily ruffles the feathers of other preschoolers on the playground, Binky is let down that he hasn't been the best role model in wrestling.
160a	5a	"No Acting, Please"	Cusi Cram	Elie Klimos, Nadja Cozic & Élise Benoît	October 12, 2009	158B
Actor Philip Seymour Hoffman guest stars as director William Toffman about theater and the arts. When Fern lands a role in Elwood City's community production of "It Began With a Whistle", she is anxious that she won't be talented very well for a star actress. Luckily, Mr. Toffman teaches Fern how to enjoy her moment and truly shine.
160b	5b	"Prunella and the Disappointing Ending" "Prunella Deegan and the Disappointing Ending"	Jonathan Greenberg	Robert Yap	October 12, 2009	157A
The final volume of the Henry Screever series has been released and Prunella and Marina compete to see who can finish the novel first, but the duo learns that "speed-reading" does not always pay off. Note: In other countries, this episode is titled "Prunella Deegan and the Disappointing Ending".
161a	6a	"When Carl Met George" "George and the Missing Puzzle Piece"	Peter K. Hirsch	Gerry Capelle & Nick Vallinakis	April 5, 2010	164A
George is excited about spending time with his new friend, Carl. who seems to know all kinds of cool facts about steam engines and... well a lot of things. Suddenly, George learns that Carl has Asperger syndrome, a form of autism that makes Carl see the world differently than most people. Note: In other countries, this episode is titled "George and the Missing Puzzle Piece."
161b	6b	"D.W. Swims with the Fishes"	Cydne Clark & Steve Granat	Robert Yap	April 5, 2010	150A
D.W. and James enter the preschool swim meet and recruit their older siblings to coach them. It all goes swimmingly until Arthur and Molly take their jobs too seriously, prompting the youngsters to wonder just who this race is about.
162a	7a	"A Portrait of the Artist as a Young Tibble"	Peter K. Hirsch	Nick Vallinakis & Daniel Miodini	April 6, 2010	150B
The Tibbles set out on their new business venture and sell their preschool art masterpieces for money to buy the coveted Krummy Kreepy Kastle.
162b	7b	"The Secret Guardians"	Guy Lancaster	Daniel Decelles	April 6, 2010	160A
When Arthur, Binky, and Sue Ellen discover a private woodland oasis, they vow to keep the place a secret. However, they find evidence of human habitation by sailing a model ship on the river.
163a	8a	"Fernlets by Fern"	David Steven Cohen	Zhigang Wang	April 7, 2010	158A
As part of her latest business venture, Muffy talks to Fern about writing poetry for greeting cards, and they both become Elwood City's big hit. However, when booming business causes Fern to burn out, can she and Muffy make writing fun again?
163b	8b	"Prunella and the Haunted Locker"	Gentry Menzel	Nick Vallinakis & Sylvie Lafrance	April 7, 2010	157B
Prunella has to use a locker that is rumored to be haunted and she denies believing this, until mysterious and unexplained obstacles cause Prunella's mind to play tricks on her. Can Prunella get to the bottom of the frightening mystery, or will she have seven years of bad luck?
164a	9a	"Paradise Lost"	Jonathan Greenberg	Nick Vallinakis & Daniel Miodini	April 8, 2010	153A
As Kate is beginning to grow up, she's started saying her first words. But strangely, the more words she learns, the less she seems to understand Pal. They head to a children's zoo in search of a "Dolly Llama" for an explanation, and to see if they can reverse the process. Luckily, they soon learn that growing up is inevitable and not too unsettling.
164b	9b	"The Pride of Lakewood"	Peter K. Hirsch	Zhigang Wang, Jeremy O'Neill, Nick Vallinakis & Gerry Capelle	April 8, 2010	165B
To boost school pride, Arthur's friends form the Lakewood Pride Committee, fervently adding a lot of members and creating special chants. Although the Brain and Sue Ellen are feeling too pressured to join in and are accused of hating Lakewood Elementary, they both can prove that they are proud of this school.
165a	10a	"Looking for Bonnie"	David Steven Cohen	Daniel Miodini & Jeremy O'Neill	April 9, 2010	165A
Dean Lomax, a famous rock musician, visits Elwood City and asks Mr. Lundgren to fix his equally also-famous guitar, Bonnie. Legend says that Bonnie is magical, and Buster and George are convinced that one strum will give them special powers. They sneak into Mr. Lundgren's garage during a sleepover to find out if it's true.
165b	10b	"The Secret Origin of Supernova"	Jonathan Greenberg	Robert Yap	April 9, 2010	160B
Arthur is dismayed when he learns that an energy drink endorsed by his favorite comic character is overloaded with sugar, and it won't give him energy or magic powers, so he ends up inventing his own superhero.

== Production ==
Episodes from this season were produced together with season 12. As a result, the episodes from this season were aired on several countries such as Canada, United Kingdom, and Australia, prior to the U.S.

One of the most notable episodes, "The Great MacGrady" (co-sponsored by the Lance Armstrong Foundation) deals with the topical issue of cancer (a topic that had only been addressed once in an animated series). Executive producer Jacqui Deegan comments on the WGBH press release:

Cancer affects nearly everyone in some way. We hope that this two-part episode will empower kids, families and caregivers to talk about all the feelings that can come up when a loved one has cancer, and how they can work together and remain positive and hopeful through difficult times.

The episode premiered during the week-long programming block A Very Special Arthur. The episode's ending features a dedication to Leah Ryan, who died in 2008. The character of Mrs. MacGrady was renamed Leah MacGrady in Ryan's honor.

"No Acting, Please / Prunella and the Disappointing Ending" is listed as the fifth episode of this season on PBS's official episode guide and "The Great MacGrady" as the first, although they are flipped in order according to original U.S. airdate.

=== Celebrity guests ===
Philip Seymour Hoffman guest starred as himself on the episode "No Acting, Please".

Lance Armstrong guest starred as himself — for the second time on the series — on the episode "The Great MacGrady".

=== Promotion ===
A book version of the episode has been released on the PBS Kids website in English and Spanish before its airing date, along with information about cancer.

The Lance Armstrong Foundation Headquarters and WGBH Boston Studios have shown pre-screenings of "The Great MacGrady" a week before its television premiere. In addition to viewing the episode, children had the opportunity to participate in activities in response to the contents of the episode. WITF Public Media Center also held a pre-screening event along with several other public libraries.

==== A Very Special Arthur ====
"The Great MacGrady" was aired on October 19, 2009 at Arthur's regular time. This programming block was promoted as A Very Special Arthur. A promotional video was shown the week before the programming block in between Arthur and other PBS Kids GO! television programs.

The decision for A Very Special Arthur was made by PBS and the Lance Armstrong Foundation. Their goal was to make the episode as accessible as possible to children, families, and educators so they would have the tools to discuss about the heavily impacting topic.
