= Mind Your Manners (film) =

1953 film

Mind Your Manners is a Hollywood short drama film, produced by Coronet Instructional Media, and starring John Lindsay. The film demonstrates the benefits of being unfailingly polite and well mannered to everyone by showing teenagers how being polite and well-dressed is the key to making everyone like them. The film was released in 1953.

== Cast ==
- John Lindsay as a Jack Connors.
