= Arthur season 16 =

Arthur
- Season 16
- No. of episodes: 10 (19 segments)

Release
- Original network: PBS Kids
- Original release: October 15, 2012 – May 10, 2013

Season chronology
- ← Previous; Season 15 Next → Season 17

The sixteenth season of the television series Arthur was originally broadcast on PBS Kids in the United States from October 15, 2012 until May 10, 2013 and consists of 10 episodes. This season was the first to be distributed internationally by 9 Story Media Group, as Cookie Jar Entertainment merged with DHX Media. Among the networks licensing season 16 of Arthur were CBC in Canada, CBBC in the UK, ABC TV in Australia, and Noga in Israel.

Season 16 was the first to switch from traditional animation to in-house Flash animation. The Flash animation for the episodes of this season are made with Adobe Flash by 9 Story Media Group.

== Episodes ==
No. overall	No. in season	Title	Written by	Storyboard by	Original release date
186	1	"Based on a True Story"	Peter K. Hirsch	Gerry Capelle & Cilbur Rocha	October 15, 2012
A new girl named Ladonna Compson and her younger brother, Bud Compson, move to Elwood City from Louisiana with Mr. and Mrs. Compson. In order to make friends, she tells the Lakewood students stories about her life. As she continues with her tales, the kids get bored when she tells the same ones multiple times. Ladonna begins to fabricate her stories and is caught by Brain when she makes a factual mistake. When something amazing does happen to Ladonna, nobody believes her, and she has to prove it. Meanwhile, Bud tries to befriend D.W.
187a	2a	"Flippity Francine"	Matt Hoverman	Allan Jeffery	October 16, 2012
Francine becomes popular after starring in an embarrassing video, but she gets tired of everyone bringing it up, and tries to get famous for something she is proud of.
187b	2b	"Muffy Takes the Wheel"	Jonathan Greenberg	Gerry Capelle	October 16, 2012
Muffy asks Ed for help with a car model-building assignment for the Lakewood Derby, and he promptly takes over.
188a	3a	"All About D.W."	Claudia Silver	Ken Cunningham	October 17, 2012
D.W. wants to play Little Red Riding Hood in her preschool play, but is jealous when Emily gets the part. She tries to get Emily to quit the play, and when Emily is ill, D.W. ends up as her understudy.
188b	3b	"Blockheads"	Jonathan Greenberg	Robert Yap	October 17, 2012
At preschool, D.W. and Emily build their very own dream house out of blocks.
189a	4a	"Get Smart"	Claudia Silver	Cilbur Rocha	October 18, 2012
Mr. Ratburn's class is given the chance to test out HUGO, an interactive whiteboard that is supposedly 100% accurate. When HUGO corrects Mr. Ratburn in front of the class, the Brain locates evidence that Mr. Ratburn was correct.
189b	4b	"Baby Steps"	P. Kevin Strader	Gerry Capelle	October 18, 2012
Worried that Kate may never mature, D.W. tries to get Kate to demonstrate her intelligence. Meanwhile, she and Pal are confused by D.W.'s odd behavior, and try to find a cure.
190a	5a	"Night of the Tibble"	Dietrich Smith	Allan Jeffery	October 19, 2012
The Tibbles invite James to their sleepover. Worried for James' safety, D.W. and Emily try to help James to back out of the invitation.
190b	5b	"Read and Flumberghast"	Peter K. Hirsch	Robert Yap	October 19, 2012
When Bud accuses Tommy Tibble of stealing a cupcake from him, D.W. has a court trial, and is on the case of the stolen cupcake.
191a	6a	"The Last Tough Customer"	P. Kevin Strader & Peter K. Hirsch	Cilbur Rocha	May 6, 2013
Binky decides that the Tough Customers should quit bullying after noticing it is not effective anymore. Slink and Rattles both agree with Binky, but Molly refuses to change. The boys try anything to get her to change her mind, but nothing works. However, after realizing that James is starting to copy her bullying, Molly decides to change her behavior.
191b	6b	"Brain's Chess Mess"	Peter K. Hirsch	Allan Jeffery	May 6, 2013
The Brain starts a chess club to beat Los Dedos at school, but Rattles is the only one who takes it seriously.
192a	7a	"Baseball Blues"	David Steven Cohen	Ken Cunningham	May 7, 2013
George is very knowledgeable about baseball, but his first season doesn't go like he planned, so he learns that he needs to play good as well.
192b	7b	"Brain's Biggest Blunder"	Matt Hoverman	Robert Yap	May 7, 2013
The Brain tutors Buster at math to win a competition.
193a	8a	"Buster's Book Battle"	Jonathan Greenberg	Gerry Capelle	May 8, 2013
Lakewood Elementary has just instituted IRP, a program where kids can earn points and prizes for reading. Buster struggles between choosing to read a boring series to earn a prize, or an appealing book that does not give him points.
193b	8b	"On the Buster Scale"	Dietrich Smith	Ken Cunningham	May 8, 2013
Buster and the Brain never agree about movie ratings, so they fight over them, with Buster rating everything a "10+" and the Brain disliking all of them.
194a	9a	"Fern and the Case of the Stolen Story"	Craig Carlisle	Jeremy O'Neill	May 9, 2013
Fern suffers from writer's block and writes a detective series heavily based on some of Ladonna's tales, without her permission.
194b	9b	"Sue Ellen Vegges Out"	Jacqui Deegan	Raymond Jafelice	May 9, 2013
Sue Ellen goes vegan, which inspires Muffy and Francine to take it up. Muffy sees it as a trend but soon lapses, causing Francine to bet she can be "meatless". Muffy goes too far when she hosts a meat-themed potluck dinner to trick Francine into eating meat, and Sue Ellen points out they are just looking for an excuse to fight with each other.
195a	10a	"So Funny I Forgot to Laugh"	Peter K. Hirsch	Allan Jeffery	May 10, 2013
When Sue Ellen receives a new sweater from her pen pal, Arthur teases her about it, but is unaware how much his bullying is bothering her. Mr. Ratburn tells Arthur to write an apology letter to Sue Ellen, but his letter is insincere when he tells her she overreacted. He then mistakenly sends her an insulting picture and soon realizes how much of a bully he has been.
195b	10b	"The Best Day Ever"	Andy Yerkes	Gerry Capelle	May 10, 2013
Arthur and his friends recount their best days ever.

== Voice casting ==
The voice actors for Arthur, D.W., Brain, Timmy, and Catherine have all been replaced by new actors : Drew Adkins has taken over the role of Arthur, stepping in to replace Dallas Jokic. Jake Beale has recently taken over the role of D.W. from Robert Naylor. Siam Yu has recently taken over the pivotal role of Brain, succeeding Lyle O'Donohoe. Jacob Ewaniuk has replaced Dakota Goyo as Timmy, and Robyn Thaler has replaced Alexina Cowan as Catherine. Beale previously voiced James in seasons 11 through 15.

This season marked a significant introduction to the storyline with the debut of two new characters, Ladonna Compson and Bud Compson, both voiced by Krystal Meadows and Julie Lemieux, respectively.
