= List of Arthur characters =

This is a list of characters featured in the PBS Kids television show Arthur, based on the book series by Marc Brown.

Arthur Read is the main character and protagonist of the series. Other major characters include D.W., Buster, Muffy, Francine, Binky, the Brain, Sue Ellen, Mr. Ratburn, Kate, and Arthur's parents. Minor characters—such as Fern, George, Prunella, the Tibble Twins, Emily, and Jenna—have been gradually expanded upon throughout the series. Over the years, character roles and relationships have changed and expanded as episodes have developed the secondary and supporting characters.

== Children ==
=== The Read Family ===
- Arthur Read (Note: In "Arthur's Big Hit", Jane calls out to Arthur, referring to him by his full name: Arthur Timothy Read.) (voiced by Michael Yarmush 1996–2000, 2022; Justin Bradley 2001; Mark Rendall 2002–2003; Cameron Ansell 2004–2007; Dallas Jokic 2008–2012; Drew Adkins 2012–2014; William Healy 2014–2016; Jacob Ursomarzo 2016–2018; Roman Lutterotti 2019–2022) is an 8-year-old aardvark. He is the eldest child of the Read family and attends third grade at Lakewood Elementary School in Elwood City. He has two younger sisters, D.W. and Kate, and a dog named Pal. He plays the piano, wears a yellow sweater with a white collared shirt underneath, blue jeans, and round brown glasses. He is shown to love Bionic Bunny, Dark Bunny, comics and Love Ducks.
- Dora Winifred (D.W.) Read (Note: First revealed in "D.W.'s Name Game": "Bleep":) (voiced by Michael Caloz 1996–1999; Oliver Grainger 1999–2001; Jason Szwimer 2002–2006; Luciano Rauso 2006; Ryan Ehrenworth 2007; Robert Naylor 2007–2012; Jake Beale 2012–2014; Andrew Dayton 2014–2016; Christian Distefano 2016–2018; Ethan Pugiotto 2019–2022; Nissae Isen 2022) is the middle child of the Read family and Arthur's younger sister. She is 4 years old and a preschooler who is also the older sister of Kate. She has light brown, slightly curled/waved hair in the form of a bob cut, as well as bangs.
- Kate Read (voiced by Tracy Braunstein) is the youngest child of the Read family and Arthur and D.W.'s younger sister. As a baby, she can communicate with animals such as Pal, Killer, Toady, Mr. Toad, Amigo, Nemo, and Pepe the Flea, as well as other babies such as Mei-Lin Barnes. As she grows up, she loses communication with some of these characters. However, she comes to understand her family's speech better.

=== Arthur's friends ===
- Buster Baxter (voiced by Daniel Brochu; credited as Conway Bruce in Arthur's Missing Pal) is Arthur's best friend. He is a white rabbit who wears a turquoise long-sleeve polo shirt and jeans. He loves eating and keeps expired food in his room and school desk. He has asthma, is quite obsessed with aliens, loves telling jokes, is an amateur detective, practices gardening, and plays the tuba. He is an only child whose parents divorced when he was a little kid. He created and celebrates a no-frills holiday called "Baxter Day" with his mother. His father travels the world as a pilot; Buster features his travels with his father on the spin-off series Postcards from Buster.
- Mary Alice (Muffy) Crosswire (voiced by Melissa Altro) is a monkey who usually has long red hair, which she usually wears in two braids adorned with purple bows that usually match her purple and white dress. She was firstly drawn with two front buck-teeth in the books and early episodes, though this was soon changed through time. She and her older brother, Chip, are the two children of Ed Crosswire, the owner of the used car dealership Crosswire Motors, and his wife, Millicent. Muffy is the quintessential daddy's girl, with Ed believing that his daughter can do no wrong and constantly buying expensive, trendy items such as cell phones and designer clothing.
- Francine Alice Frensky (voiced by Jodie Lynn Resther, credited as Jodie Resther in earlier seasons) is a monkey who has short brown hair clipped with two yellow barrettes on both sides and usually wears blue jeans and a maroon sweater. She is a tomboy, and enjoys playing sports, horseback riding, playing the drums, and singing. Her family is Jewish and in some episodes is seen observing Yom Kippur, Hanukkah, and attending a cousin's Bar Mitzvah. Francine's best friend is Muffy, with both sharing the same middle name. In earlier seasons, Francine teased on Arthur—such as when he got glasses, and when his baby tooth would not come out. However, they became good friends afterwards. She has an older sister named Catherine.
- Alan "The Brain" Powers (voiced by Luke Reid 1996–1999; Steven Crowder 2000–2001; Alex Hood 2002–2005; Paul-Stuart Brown 2004–2007; James Buckholder 2006; Lyle O'Donohue 2008–2012; Siam Yu 2012–2014; Max Friedman Cole 2014–2018; Evan Blaylock 2019–2022) is a bear of Senegalese descent who usually wears a grey sweater. He is highly academic and well-educated in many subjects, especially science and math, and has an "A" grade average. His classmates call him "Brain" or, when referring to him in third-person, "The Brain". His family celebrates Kwanzaa and owns an ice cream parlor, where his classmates frequently visit after school and on weekends. He was held back in kindergarten for crying a lot and being afraid of swimming, but can be seen swimming in some episodes. He revealed that his uncle has Asperger's syndrome in "When Carl Met George".
- Shelley "Binky" Barnes (voiced by Bruce Dinsmore) is a bulldog who usually wears an orange shirt, blue jeans, and brown shoes. He is in third grade for the second time after failing and having to retake it. He plays the clarinet, catches butterflies, loves art, and enjoys ballet. In "Binky Goes Nuts", it is revealed that he has a severe allergy to peanuts. Binky has an adopted baby sister from China named Mei-Lin. He is a bully and a member of the Tough Customers, a group of thugs and bullies, but has a soft side and is close with Arthur and his friends. In the episode "Binky Barnes, Art Expert", he tries to help Arthur and Buster. In the episode "Big Horns George", he compliments George's guitar by saying, "Woah, nice guitar! Can I see?" and after returning the guitar, says he likes the chord George plays. Despite not being very good at school, in "Binky's A Game", he reads his assigned book and receives an A on the test.
- Sue Ellen Armstrong (voiced by Patricia Rodriguez, or "Rodrigues" in early credits, 1996–2003; Jessica Kardos, 2004–2022) is a third-grader cat and one of Arthur's classmates at Lakewood Elementary School. She is usually depicted wearing a teal dress, a cream vest with red buttons, red high-top shoes with a lime green "slouch" socks, and curly orange hair bound up in pigtails by lime green scrunchies. She officially moved to Elwood City in the winter of her third-grade school year (but has appeared in Mr. Marco's second-grade class). Her father is a diplomat, so her family has lived in various spots around the world. Unlike Emily, Tommy, and Timmy, she traveled with her parents. She is also deeply interested in world culture and is skilled in martial arts. She practices karate (taekwondo in earlier seasons) and plays the saxophone. Sue Ellen was born as an only child and kept in touch with her brother-like pen pal, Tenzin Wangdu, in Tibet. She is very close to nature and becomes a vegetarian in Season 16.
- Fern Walters (voiced by Holly Gauthier-Frankel) is a light brown dog and one of Arthur's classmates. She usually wears a purple long-sleeved blouse with yellow collars and cuffs, yellow pants, and a red ribbon on her head. Fern is usually a very timid and nervous girl, but when pushed far enough can be assertive enough to stand up for herself. She enjoys reading poetry and novels (especially "Sherlock Holmes" and "Frankenstein's Monster") and is particularly interested in gothic and horror themes. She writes poems and stories, holds group poetry readings at the library, and is an amateur detective. Her close friend is George, as they both have similar personalities and sometimes act like detectives.
- George Lundgren (George Nordgren before season 11) (voiced by Mitchell Rothpan 1996–2002; Evan Smirnow 2003; Samantha Reynolds 2008–2010; Eleanor Noble 2004–2007, 2010–2022) is a moose of Norwegian and Swedish descent who wears an orange shirt with khaki pants and green sneakers. It is revealed in Season 6 that he has dyslexia. He is very adept at building and construction, as his father is a woodworker, and constantly wins school's creation contests. George likes to practice ventriloquism with his giraffe dummy "Wally" that his father gifted him one Christmas. Wally acts as his much more sassy, outgoing alter ego. George is usually a very timid and introverted boy, but as the series goes on, the others gradually accept him. Finally, in Season 20, he is appointed as Lakewood Elementary's hall monitor.
- Prunella Deegan (voiced by Tamar Kozlov) is a poodle. In 2011, however, PBS said that she was a rat, but in 2013, Marc Brown confirmed that she is actually a poodle. She is a fourth grader who usually wears a blue dress with a white collar and a purple bow in her hair. She initially was characterized as something of a know-it-all, but that trait was toned down in following seasons. She is interested in yoga, fortune telling, and paranormal phenomena. She loves the fictional Henry Skreever books (based on Harry Potter) and has studied braille. Prunella struggled with hoarding, as outlined in the episode "Prunella the Packrat".
- Tommy Tibble and Timmy Tibble are identical twin bear brothers who are four years old and routinely exasperate others with their destructive antics. Tommy wears a red scarf, and Timmy wears a blue scarf. They stay with their grandmother while their parents work overseas and travel around the world, giving them souvenirs and gifts. The twins torment D.W. and occasionally manipulate her into doing silly and unusual things that only get her into trouble, even though D.W. has acknowledged many times that they always lie.
  - Tommy: voiced by Jonathan Koensgen (1996–2002), Aaron Grunfeld (2002–2003), Tyler Brody-Stein (2004–2005), Madison Danielle (2006), Ryan Tilson (2006–2007), Jake Rosemaan (2008–2010), Jake Sim (2010–2016), Devan Cohen (2016–2022), Benjamin Hum (2019)
  - Timmy: voiced by Ricky Mabe (1996–2000), Samuel Holden (2001–2005), Max Henry Wolf (2006), Tyler Brody-Stein (2006–2007), Chris Lortie (2008–2010), Dakota Goyo (2010–2012), Jacob Ewaniuk (2012–2016), Samuel Faraci (2016–2022), Matthew Mucci (2019)
- Emily Leduc (voiced by Vanessa Lengies Season 1–7 1996–2002; Sally Taylor-Isherwood 2003–2022) is a white rabbit with blonde hair, wearing a pink dress before Season 6, and a blue dress since Season 6. She is D.W.'s best friend in preschool. She is an expert in gymnastics and is knowledgeable in French culture. She has a French nanny named Marie Hélène.
- Maria Pappas (voiced by Stacey DePass, credited as Stacey Depasse) is a rabbit with brown hair in Mr. Ratburn's class. Her clothing usually consists of a striped shirt with a blue dress; Maria's original character design included glasses. Maria participates in many clubs and activities but never is the center of attention. She appears in many episodes in the background, except for "Francine Goes to War", in which Francine insults her a lot, and her breakout episode, "Maria Speaks", which reveals that she talks with a stutter when she is chosen to be the reporter for the school's news program. Her best friend is Jenna Morgan.
- Jenna Morgan (voiced by Brigid Tierney) is a gray cat who usually wears a pink dress with yellow buttons. She is one of Arthur's classmates, and really dislikes being the center of attention. She is lactose intolerant, plays badminton, helps coach soccer, and received an "Athlete of the Year" award from Michelle Kwan. In "Binky Goes Nuts", it is revealed that she has a milk allergy. Jenna is rather very shy, and in "Jenna's Bedtime Blues", she dreads an invitation to Muffy's slumber party due to her fear that her friends will discover that she has nocturnal enuresis.
- Alex Davidson (voiced by Riley Moreau) is a gray rabbit usually wearing a tan collared sweater, long brown jeans, and blue and white sneakers. In the episode "Buster's Dino Dilemma", Alex wore a white shirt that had purple on it, purple shorts with green on it, long green socks, and red and white sneakers.
- Ladonna Compson (voiced by Krystal Meadows) is a rabbit with a brownish-tan complexion who speaks with a dominant southern accent and is native to New Orleans, Louisiana. She is Bud's older sister, and Madison and Gussie's younger sister, who first appeared in Season 16 in the episode "Based on a True Story". She is a new student at Lakewood Elementary School. Ladonna and her family end up moving to Oregon when her father Rufus is transferred there with the Corps of Engineers in "When Duty Calls". However, she still appears in later episodes that narratively predate "When Duty Calls".

=== Other recurring children ===
- Adil Akyuz (voiced by Aaron Grunfeld) is a brown bear and Arthur's Turkish pen pal, who was introduced in "Dear Adil".
- Alberto Molina (voiced by Johnny Griffin in "Follow the Bouncing Ball"; Benjamin Israel in "The Long Road Home"; and Daniel DeSanto) is a teenage boy who is one of Arthur's neighbors. He is a dark brown cat. He and his family are from Ecuador, and were first introduced during Season 6, following the departure of Mr. Sipple. He practices kendo in his spare time and is very good at golf. In a continuous storyline throughout all of Season 14, his soccer ball, lost by Francine, makes a long journey around the world and can be seen in every episode.
- Alouysious Zimmerplotz is a kid in D.W.'s preschool class who has trouble writing his long name. He is a cat with yellow square glasses and a white shirt with a red jacket.
- Billy Bittles and Bobby Bittles are two vegetarian fraternal twin bear cubs in the preschool class with D.W. Read. They appeared in Season 3.
- Bud Tucker Compson (voiced by Julie Lemieux) is Ladonna, Madison, and Gussie's younger brother, who also first appeared in "Based on a True Story". He is a rabbit with a light brown complexion who usually wears black rain boots, blue jeans, a lime T-shirt, a blue vest, and a red hat. He has an imaginary friend named Rapty, who everyone else sees as his beloved stuffed T-Rex. Bud is assertive, rugged, and not afraid of the Tibble Twins. He attends the same preschool as D.W. Read.
- Carl Gould (voiced by Dylan Hoerner) is a cream rabbit with brown hair and blue glasses. He is on the autism spectrum (until 2013, he is shown to have Asperger's syndrome), and his best friend is George Lundgren. He plays the accordion, flies kites, and is highly knowledgeable in locomotives (to the point where he can create detailed drawings of them from memory), lions, and space. His favorite color is blue. He states that he prefers to drink "apple juice from a box, not a bottle".
- Catherine Frensky (voiced by Patricia Rodriguez 1997–2002; Alexina Cowan 2003–2012; Robyn Thaler Hickey 2012–2022) is Francine's older sister. She is in high school and likes to read teen magazines. Catherine is outgoing and skilled at horseback riding. She occasionally babysits for the Reads. She is quite embarrassed to tell people her father is a sanitation worker. She usually wears a white-sleeved jean jacket with a white oversized sweater/sweatshirt with black leggings, red slouchy socks, black and white shoes, and always wears her hair with bangs and a ponytail with a scrunchie.
- Cheikh (pronounced "Shake") (voiced by Thamela Mpumlwana) is Brain's cousin from Senegal who moves to Elwood City in the episode "In My Africa" and begins attending D.W.'s preschool. He and his parents become American citizens via naturalization in the episode "Citizen Cheikh".
- Chip Crosswire (voiced by Cory Doran) is Muffy's older brother, who is a college student at Tallahassee Tech, a fictional school. He was first shown in Muffy's family portrait in the 1982 book Arthur Goes to Camp. His name was first subtly revealed in "Arthur's Perfect Christmas" (there were separate Christmas stockings for Chip and Muffy side-by-side on their fireplace) and later directly mentioned in the episode "Phony Fern". He wears a blue v-neck college sweater and a white turtleneck underneath. His first appearance was in "Matchmaker, Matchbreaker", where he comes home from college and Muffy and Francine introduce him to Francine's sister Catherine.
- Cousin Cora is a bratty cousin of Arthur, D.W., and Kate who appears in "D.W. Thinks Big". She acts like a spoiled brat when left alone with D.W., but acts like a nice girl when adults are around. Her bratty nature is later exposed at their Aunt Lucy's wedding. It is unknown who does her voice.
- Monique/"Mo" (voiced by Melissa Pirrera) is Arthur's, D.W.'s, and Kate's oldest cousin, whom Arthur remembers as being awful to him at past family reunions; he tries to avoid her until it is revealed that Mo really isn't as bad as Arthur thought. She, like Arthur, plays the piano and says that Arthur is her favorite relative. Mo is the daughter of Loretta and has an athletic younger brother close to Arthur's age and a younger sister close to D.W.'s age.
- Cousin Ricky is Mo's brother and Bud's and Loretta's son. He is very athletic and somewhat bossy. His skin color changes in each episode he appears in. It is unknown who does his voice.
- Cousin Ryder is Arthur's age and lives on the family farm in Ohio. While he and Arthur used to be close, they discover in "The Rhythm and Roots of Arthur" that they are pretty different and come to terms with their differences. Laurie is Ryder's baby sister. Cousin Miles grew up in Cleveland, but he has spent so many years living and working on the Read family farm that he has become a part of the family. He is the chief llama breeder on the farm. It is unknown who does his voice.
- Isabella is a student at Mighty Mountain Elementary School who is a local chess master. She is known for tapping her fingernails during chess games, which earned her the nickname "Los Dedos" (Spanish for "The Fingers"). At first, she is slightly snobby, as she is seen calling Brain "an amateur" after beating him at chess on numerous occasions. It is unknown who does her voice.
- Gussie Compson (voiced by Robert Tinkler) is Bud, Madison and Ladonna's brother who works at the alligator sanctuary.
- James MacDonald (voiced by Robert Naylor 2003; Jesse Camacho 2004–2006; Nicholas Wheeler-Hughes 2007–2009; London Angelis 2010; John Flemming 2012–2014; Christian Distefano 2014–2022) (not to be confused with James MacDonald the sound effects artist) is a white rabbit who wears glasses. He is usually very shy and quiet. He is in Ms. Morgan's class at preschool, and has an older sister named Molly MacDonald.
- Madison Compson (voiced by Melissa Altro) is Bud, Ladonna and Gussie's older sister.
- Molly MacDonald (voiced by Maggie Castle) is close friends with Binky. She is a white rabbit and a senior member of the Tough Customers. She became a thug and a bully herself after being bullied in preschool, which she later avoided after discovering she was being imitated by her younger brother James. She is very good at giving advice, but really dislikes that everybody comes to her for it. She became good friends with Arthur and D.W. and is an effective babysitter for the Tibble Twins. Molly has long maroon hair that mainly covers her eyes, often wears sleeveless shirts, and has a "2000s punk kid" personality.
- Slink (voiced by Michael Yarmush) is a 4th grader rabbit and member of the Tough Customers. In his first episode in 1997, he convinced Buster to be "cool" by doing bad things. Decades later, in the 2018 episode "Slink's Special Talent", he was revealed to be a good paper delivery boy.
- Rattles (voiced by Scott Beaudin) is another member of the Tough Customers. Rattles has been a Tough Customer member since the first season. His species is somewhat of a mystery; he appeared as a grey cat in the earliest seasons, then was made a dog in Season 8, and then was given rounded ears, like a bear, in Season 18 for unknown reasons. He wears a backward baseball hat, black leather jacket, green T-shirt, blue jeans, and high tops. He speaks with a Northern New Jersey accent and has a pit bull named Crusher. It was revealed in "Arthur Unravels" that he has an affinity for knitting. He is also quite skilled at playing chess.
- Lori is an eight-year-old rabbit living next door to Ladonna at her new home in Oregon. She appeared in the episode "When Duty Calls".
- Lydia Fox (voiced by Barbara Mamabolo) is a physically disabled fox who helps Brain get over his temporary reliance on a wheelchair in "The Wheel Deal". Through her tutoring, he learns how to play basketball in a wheelchair and almost wins a charity game of free throws (though Lydia winds up taking over for the last few shots). Lydia was the winning entry of a children's contest to design a new character, sent in by Connor Gordon from Savage, Minnesota. In Season 14, the TV credits gave Lydia the last name Gordon, but Season 19 reverted her name to Lydia Fox. Lydia reappears in the Season 19 episode "Little Miss Meanie" and the Season 21 episode "The Princess Problem".
- Marina Datillo (voiced by Helena Evangeliou) is a blind white rabbit in the 4th grade who attends Mighty Mountain Elementary School. She befriends Prunella after she inadvertently ordered a Braille copy of a Henry Skreever book and let Marina borrow it. Like Prunella, she is a big fan of Henry Skreever.
- Mei Lin Barnes (voiced by Carrie Finlay) is Binky's baby sister, a bear, who was adopted from China. She is also Baby Kate's best friend.
- Rubella Deegan (voiced by Eramelinda Boquer) is Prunella's older sister. She is very spiritual and practices psychic and paranormal phenomena. She is typically depicted as mystical and speaks dramatically, often chiding Prunella.
- Sally MacGill is Arthur's babysitter in "Crushed". She is a 16-year-old bear hired by Arthur's parents. Arthur developed a crush on her because of her skill in video games. However, Arthur was heartbroken when he found out she actually had a boyfriend.
- Tenzin is Sue Ellen's pen pal who originally lived in poverty in Tibet. He helped fill a void that Sue Ellen felt because Sue Ellen is an only child and doesn't have much in common with her friends. As a result, Sue Ellen mistakenly called him her "Little Brother". Later, he moved to Dharamsala, India, where he started to email Sue Ellen. They eventually met, revealing that Sue Ellen and Tenzin are the same age. He is a panda and originally had black fur; this was later retconned.
- Vicita Molina (voiced by Alyson Wener) is the Read family's new neighbor. Her age is "three and seven-eighths", and, as a result, D.W. believes herself to be a role model for Vicita. Vicita and her family are from Ecuador, and moved to Elwood City in Season 6, replacing Mr. Sipple.
- W.D. Merkle (full name is Wilhelmina Dagmar Merkles) (voiced by Raphael Cohen-Demers) is a bear girl and tomboy foil to D.W. She has an imaginary friend named Maxine. Her parents, Herman and Ursa, are great friends with the Reads; however, W.D. and D.W. originally did not get along. Later, they develop a friendship, despite their clashing personalities.
- Irwin and Sanjeev are two dog boys who are Buster's cabin mates at Camp Meadowcroak in the episode "Home Sweet Home". They are best friends who have their own secret handshake and attend P.S. 22 (Public School 22) as third-graders. Despite Buster's initial reluctance at attending summer camp without anyone he knows going with him, Irwin and Sanjeev are very kind and welcoming to him. Irwin is a light yellow dog boy with pointed ears, and Sanjeev is a brown dog boy of Indian descent with long shaggy black hair.

== Adults ==
=== The Read family ===
- David Leonard Read (voiced by Bruce Dinsmore) is Arthur's, D.W.'s, and Baby Kate's father and husband of Jane Read. His mother is Grandma Thora, and he has three sisters: Loretta, who is older, Bonnie, who is younger, and Minnie, who lives in France. Mr. Read runs a catering business from home and is frequently shown garnishing trays of hors d'œuvres either in the family kitchen or in a custom-designed workshop behind the garage. He delivers his food in a dedicated commercial vehicle. Many of his recipes are questionable at first glance, and Arthur and D.W. often refuse to eat them, but at times they genuinely appreciate his cooking. He usually wears a white sweater with blue accents and khaki pants, and sometimes has an apron and chef's hat on. His paternal family is originally from Ohio and still owns a llama breeding farm there, where David spent his summers as a boy.
- Jane Read (née Story; voiced by Sonja Ball) is Arthur's, D.W.'s, and Baby Kate's mother and wife of David Read. She has a younger sister, Lucy, an older sister, Jessica, and an older brother, Fred. Her father is Grandpa Dave. Mrs. Read is a work-at-home tax accountant. She has short, shaggy brown hair and wears a pinky sweater, a white collared shirt, and blue jeans. In the books, she generally wears different clothes. She is from the Pittsburgh area and knew Fred Rogers as a child.
- Grandma Thora Read (voiced by Joanna Noyes) is Arthur's, D.W.'s, Mo's, Ricky's, George's, and Kate's apparently widowed (her husband's sole mention implies he died when Arthur's father was around his age) paternal grandmother. In the episode "The Rhythm and Roots of Arthur", it is mentioned that she spent summers at the Read family farm in Ohio when she was a girl. Grandma Thora is a columnist. In a flashback in "Clarissa is Cracked", Thora had three brothers. Grandma Thora is David, Loretta, Bonnie and Minnie's mother. It is revealed in "April 9th" that she was in a car accident (but was not hurt) when David was Arthur's age. Grandma Thora is based on Marc Brown's own grandmother Thora, who encouraged him by saving his childhood drawings in a bottom drawer.
  - Thora's mother is David Read's maternal grandmother, and Arthur's, D.W.'s, Mo's, Ricky's, George's, and Kate's paternal great-grandmother. She is seen as a young woman in "Clarissa is Cracked" and as an elderly grandmother in "Arthur's Cousin Catastrophe", where she wins the egg and spoon race.
- Grandpa Dave (voiced by A.J. Henderson) is Arthur's, D.W.'s, Cora's, and Kate's apparently widowed (his wife is never seen nor mentioned) maternal grandfather and the father of Fred, Jessica, Jane, and Lucy. He lives on the family farm in the country, which has been in the family for over 150 years. In "Grandpa Dave's Memory Album", he is revealed to be in the early stages of Alzheimer's disease which he forgot Arthur's name until it was revealed.
- Uncle Bud and Aunt Loretta are Arthur's, D.W.'s, and Kate's paternal uncle and aunt; they are the parents of Monique, Ricky, and an unnamed daughter.
- Uncle Sean and Aunt Bonnie are Arthur's, D.W.'s, and Kate's paternal uncle and aunt; they are mother and father of George.
- Uncle Fred is Arthur's, D.W.'s, and Kate's maternal uncle, and Jane's, Jessica's, and Lucy's brother. He is known throughout the family to be very clumsy. Fred has a Labrador Retriever named Rory, who is awkward like him.
- Aunt Jessica and Uncle Richard are the maternal aunt and uncle of Arthur, D.W., and Kate, and the parents of Cousin Cora. They appear in "D.W. Thinks Big" during Aunt Lucy's wedding. Jessica spoils her daughter Cora and takes her side even when she's wrong.
- Aunt Lucy is Arthur's, D.W.'s, and Kate's aunt. She is an aardvark with blonde hair. She appears in the episode "D.W. Thinks Big", where D.W. saves her wedding ring on her wedding day. In the episodes "Go to Your Room, D.W.", "D.W.'s Perfect Wish", "D.W. Unties the Knot", and "Grandpa Dave's Memory Album", Arthur and D.W. mistakenly refer to Lucy as their cousin instead of their aunt.
- Additional Read family members:
  - In the episode "The Rhythm and Roots of Arthur", the family celebrates the 85th birthday of Theodore Read (known as Theo), who is the brother of Grandma Thora's father. Everyone considers him to be the family patriarch. His long-deceased sister was named Dora Winifred and was D.W.'s namesake. Theo lives on the family farm in rural Ohio, along with Chrissy, the mother of Ryder and Laurie.
  - An "'Uncle John", serving in the military overseas but who earlier lived on the family farm, is mentioned. In the same episode, the farm is visited by Cousin Jimmy and Cousin Lorraine, as well as by Minnie, who is D.W.'s and Arthur's aunt. She has a sophisticated look with embroidered pants, suits, loafers, cat-eye eyeglasses, and a bob with severe bangs. She is a vegetarian and does not like the Read family's farm, where she spent some time as a girl.

=== Other recurring adults ===
- Mr. Armstrong (voiced by Tony Robinow) is Sue Ellen's father, a retired diplomat. His job has required him to move all across the world. However, he and his family enjoy the travel opportunities that come with it.
- Mrs. Armstrong is Sue Ellen's mother, a homemaker with a penchant for exotic clothes. She enjoys making clay pottery and sculptures.
- Bailey Carson Belvedere III (voiced by Bruce Dinsmore) is Muffy's chauffeur and sometimes the Crosswire family butler. He is a grey bloodhound in a dark grey suit, and is often seen carrying several bags of luggage. He follows Muffy's orders without question, even when her instructions are extreme, such as driving the limo dangerously or towing Muffy while on her bicycle. In the episode "The Butler Did What?", it is revealed that he plays the trumpet, went to the same elementary school as Mr. Ratburn (where the two played in the school band), and is a jazz fan. He has a notable talent for creating kinetic art. He was initially called James; the name Bailey is based on the show director of Arthur, Greg Bailey.
- Becky is an aardvark and a Meadowcroak camp counselor and librarian.
- Ed Billings is the neighbor of Grandpa Dave. He always offers to help aging Dave around his farm, but Dave is too proud to accept, until his grandchildren show him the value of accepting help from others, after which Dave asks Ed what he knows about tractor engines.
- Bubby (voiced by Joan Rivers) is Francine's and Catherine's maternal grandmother who was first seen in "Arthur's Perfect Christmas". She later dies offscreen in the Season 25 episode "Listen Up", due to Joan Rivers' death in 2014. In "The Great McGrady", Francine told Muffy that her grandfather died from cancer. Although, it is unclear if that was Bubby's husband or paternal grandfather.
- Mr. Barnes (John Moore; Peter Cugno) is Binky's father. He is revealed to work in a copy shop in the game "Arthur's 2nd Grade".
- Mrs. Barnes (Jane Wheeler; Liz MacRae) is Binky's mother, a nurse. She is protective of her son, especially in the episode "Binky Goes Nuts".
- Bitzi Lynne Baxter (voiced by Ellen David) is Buster's mom, who is divorced. She is the editor of the Elwood City Times. In early episodes, she was frantic and over-protective of Buster, but calmed in later seasons. In the early Arthur books, she had blonde hair, although the last books and TV show depict her with auburn hair. The episode "Fright Night" reveals that she had the surname Baxter even before she married Bo Baxter.
- Bo Baxter is Buster's father, who is divorced. He is a pilot. Buster flies with him around the United States in the spin-off Postcards from Buster series. In Postcards from Buster, he is shown with short brown hair and glasses. However, his physical appearance has changed several times. In early appearances, he was partially concealed by various methods, such as reading a newspaper, Buster covering his eyes while on his shoulders, or dressing as Santa Claus when meeting Buster.
- Buster's Grandmother is Buster's maternal grandmother. She is seen briefly in "Arthur Cleans Up", "Buster Makes the Grade", and the Postcards from Buster episode "Among the Hmong".
- Miss Blank is a past substitute teacher for Mr. Ratburn's class. She was the class's favorite substitute teacher because she never showed up, and the class had to be taught by Miss Sweetwater, who let them do coloring and gave them snacks.
- Coach Bumpus is a rabbit gym coach from earlier episodes. He often argues with Coach Grimsled over petty things like the last line of the nursery rhyme "Itsy Bitsy Spider".
- Mrs. Bofini is a past substitute teacher for Mr. Ratburn's class. The class disliked her because she chewed with her mouth open and sucked her teeth in front of the class.
- Ms. Bryan is the Lakewood Elementary School art teacher.
- Mrs. Cardigan is Arthur's former piano teacher who eventually retires and suggests he take lessons from Dr. Fugue. She, like Miss Sweetwater and Mrs. Fink, offered each student cookies for having a wonderful lesson.
- Mrs. Grouse is one of Arthur's and D.W.'s babysitters who always make them do dances.
- Edward Edsel "Ed" Crosswire (voiced by A.J. Henderson) is a very wealthy man who is Muffy's and Chip's father and the owner of a large car dealership called "Crosswire Motors". He is a stereotypical fat cat, who almost always wears a suit and a tie. It was revealed that he never attended college; rather he received an honorary degree from Ivy University after his donation of a library. He is also the current coach of Lakewood's soccer team. He was first shown in Muffy's family portrait in the 1982 book Arthur Goes to Camp and wasn't shown again until the first season of the cartoon show, where his appearance changed drastically.
- Millicent Crosswire (voiced by Jennifer Seguin) is Muffy's and Chip's aristocratic mother. She enjoys going to operas, as well as attending and hosting fancy parties. She was first shown in Muffy's family portrait in the 1982 book Arthur Goes to Camp and wasn't shown again until the first season of the cartoon show, where her appearance changed drastically.
- Cisely Compson is Ladonna's and Bud's mother. According to Ladonna, she played in a band until she was 25, but got so broke she had to sell her trumpet; a soldier (whom she later married) then bought it back for her. She made Ladonna wear the snow hat her Aunt Bo gave her in "Based on a True Story".
- Mrs. Datillo is Marina's sighted mother. She was first seen in her daughter's second appearance in the Season 7 episode "Prunella Sees the Light".
- Wanda Deegan is Rubella's and Prunella's mother. She enjoys yoga.
- Ms. Featherfoffer is a journalist that once babysat for Arthur. She was the worst of his babysitters, as she spent all her time watching soap operas, and sent him to bed during the day simply for making noise during her show.
- Flossie is a hairdresser who owns and runs the Salon de Beauté, where Muffy gets her hair done. She also did Francine's hair in "Francine's Bad Hair Day".
- Mr. Elkin is a past substitute teacher for Mr. Ratburn's class. He was troublesome because his large antlers would accidentally knock students out of their seats.
- Mrs. Fink is one of the third-grade teachers at Lakewood Elementary School. She and Miss Sweetwater do fun things with their classes, in contrast to Mr. Ratburn, whose class is hard work.
- Nurse Flynn works at Lakewood Elementary.
- Oliver Frensky (voiced by Mark Camacho) is Catherine's and Francine's dad, who works as a sanitation engineer for the local city dump. He states he was formerly a volunteer firefighter. He coaches the Lakewood baseball team. He is good-humored and sometimes childlike, but can be stern and authoritative when he needs to.
- Laverne Frensky (voiced by Jane Woods) is Catherine's and Francine's mother.
- Grandpa Frensky is Oliver Frensky's father and Catherine's and Francine's grandfather who owns an unnamed "hamburger castle" (a paraody of White Castle) with unique hamburgers that is still open in the episode "Background Blues". He also mentions Vingo Frensky, a barber for Abraham Lincoln in the show.
- Dr. Frederique Fugue is Arthur's current piano teacher, after Mrs. Cardigan retired. He later filled in for Ms. Krasny to take Mr. Ratburn's class on a choir field trip to Crown City (the show's version of New York City). He was a chorister as a child and later sung with the Whiffenpoofs, implying he attended Yale University. He is an extremely strict teacher and "fires" many of his students. However, he shows a softer side during the Crown City trip, openly encouraging his students to have fun with their singing. He has a pet cat named Für Elise.
- Ted Glass is the Lakewood Elementary Crossing Guard. In his first appearance in "Arthur vs. the Very Mean Crossing Guard" he tried to fool Arthur and Brain into thinking there was a new $10 fee to cross the street and they believe him, becoming scared after he threatens to send goons to collect the money after they wait too long to pay up. After being told off by Grandma Thora he lets Arthur and Brain in on his joke and they join along in the fun.
- Coach Grimsled (voiced by Jeniffer Seguin) is a 4th grade gym coach at Lakewood. She has various debates with Coach Bumpus.
- Mrs. Gutter is one of Arthur's past babysitters. Arthur disliked her because she would play golf in the house.
- Harry Mills works at Bitzi Baxter's newspaper as a sportswriter. Bitzi started dating him for a couple of seasons, but then broke off because she wanted more time to pursue other interests. Despite the break-up, he remained good friends with Buster and his mother.
- Francis Haney (voiced by Walter Massey in 1996–2014, before his death) is the lovable yet absentminded principal of Arthur's school. Like George, he has dyslexia. He also seems to have bad luck: something goes wrong almost everywhere he goes. A running gag in early episodes was a random item falling on his head, usually unintentionally caused by another character, such as Francine throwing a baseball way off course in "Arthur Makes the Team" and Loretta flipping the burgers too high in "Arthur's Cousin Catastrophe". In the Season 20 episode "The Hallway Minotaur", he was revealed to have moved away to Tanzania to build a school.
- Mr. Higgins is an Elwood City mail carrier.
- Dr. Iris is an eye doctor who suggested that Arthur needed glasses in the first episode "Arthur's Eyes". She is a cat.
- Mr. Kone (voiced by Marc Graue) is the owner of an ice cream factory appearing in "Arthur's Missing Pal". He helps Pal escape from the ice cream factory, while also avoiding two ferocious dogs named Sugar and Spice.
- Ms. Krasny is the Lakewood Elementary School music teacher. Her last name is named after Marc Brown's wife's maiden name.
- Fritz Langley is the caretaker of the Elwood City Community Garden who sometimes has arthritis in his hands while working. He eventually moves to a retirement community.
- Mr. Leduc is Emily's father who is only seen during the episodes "Emily Swallows a Horse" and "The Good, the Bad, and the Binky". In the former episode, he is in bed, and his head is turned away, hiding his face. In a later episode, it is revealed that unlike his daughter and wife who are rabbits, he is a monkey. Emily is seen with her French nanny Marie-Hélène more than her parents, which shows that they do not have much time for her.
- Mrs. Leduc is Emily's mother, who looks very different from her daughter. She makes many brief appearances, and in "Emily Swallows a Horse" she is seen adorning herself in a gown, suggesting that she enjoys formal events. She is also seen in "The Good, the Bad, and the Binky".
- Neal Lundgren is the father of George Lundgren, and a carpenter who runs a private wood repair shop in his garage. He also teaches a shop class that his son sometimes attends.
- Mrs. Lundgren is George's mother who is seen much less than her husband; in fact, she only appears in the episode "Kids are from Earth, Parents are from Pluto" and briefly in "April 9".
- Leah MacGrady (Sara MacGrady before Season 13) is in charge of the cafeteria at Lakewood Elementary school. She is full of unconventional wisdom, and is Grandma Thora's bingo buddy. She commonly wears a pink shirt and white pants. Like Prunella, she enjoys fortune telling. In "The Great MacGrady", she was diagnosed with cancer, but has since continued to work at Lakewood, suggesting that she ultimately recovered. She was also a member of the band U Stink in the movie special "Arthur, It's Only Rock' N' Roll", a clip of which is seen while Francine writes a letter asking for advice to help her cope with MacGrady having cancer.
- Mr. Marco is Arthur's second-grade teacher. He is often seen during the series, but Arthur is only seen in his class through flashbacks. He was a moose in the books, but an aardvark like Arthur in the show. He is slightly stern, has zero tolerance for cheating, and is friends with Mr. Ratburn.
- Marie-Hélène is Emily's French nanny, who takes care of Emily more than her parents and teaches her some French words.
- Herman Merkle (voiced by Andrew Sabiston) is a bear and is W.D.'s father. He is friends with David Read, and the two go canoe fishing together.
- Ursa Merkle (voiced by Tracey Hoyt) is a bear and is W.D.'s mother. She is friends with Jane Read, who helps her with tax papers. Ursa performs biology and geology research for fun.
- Ramon Molina is Arthur's new Ecuadorian neighbor, who moves in Mr. Sipple's old house with his family. He is revealed to own and run an Ecuadorian cuisine restaurant.
- Mrs. Molina (voiced by Dawn Ford) is married to Ramon Molina, and mother of Vicita and Alberto. In "Dancing Fools", she teaches a children's dance class.
- Carl Manino is the longtime owner of the Sugar Bowl.
- Mr. Morgan is Jenna's father who was seen and heard from in the episode "Jenna's Bedtime Blues".
- Mrs. Morgan is Jenna's mother who very briefly appears in "Muffy's New Best Friend" and "Elwood City Turns 100". She helps make costumes for the play using her sewing machine; it appears that she has a talent for sewing.
- Ms. Morgan is D.W.'s preschool teacher, and a gymnastics instructor. She is a bear, an indication that she is not related to Jenna's family, who are all cats.
- Mr. Morris (voiced by Al Gravelle) is the beagle Lakewood Elementary School janitor, who moves to Roswell, New Mexico to live with his daughter after breaking his leg during the Lakewood fire on "April 9". He is seen in the Postcards from Buster episode "Alien Adventure", where Buster visits New Mexico, seeming to have recovered from his injury. Although he moved away, he is seen in the background of several episodes after "April 9". Like Buster, he has asthma. He does it for free.
- Mrs. Pariso is Francine's next-door neighbor, who is very good at horseback riding and also won prizes at Wimbledon. She appeared in the episode "Francine Goes to War" and in an episode of Postcards from Buster. She banged on Francine's wall when she first moved into their apartment building, which made Francine think she was a spirit who scares others to death, starting a brief rivalry; luckily, the two became good friends in the end when they both discover they like soda and horseback riding. Francine later explained that the reason Mrs. Pariso was mean was because she was lonely. She ignored Francine and Prunella when they disturbed her. When Buster called her a witch, she didn't seem to mind it (unlike Francine) and told a story about when she once met a warlock.
- Patrick Ratburn (voiced by Marcel Jeanin) is Mr. Ratburn's husband; the two are married in the episode "Mr. Ratburn & the Special Someone". He sells chocolate—including a particular chocolate that he refers to as a "Frida Kahlo"—at Patrick's Chocolates in Elwood City.
- Signore Pelato is a clown barber who owns and runs the Signore Pelato Barber Shop in "D.W., Queen of the Comeback". In the same episode, he cuts D.W.'s hair too short, causing the Tibble Twins to nickname her "Dennis".
- Pickles is a local circus clown who does gigs in Elwood City, including birthday parties and Elwood City's annual Downtown Day. He's incredibly allergic to dogs.
- Mr. Powers (voiced by Terrence Scammell) is Brain's father, who appears to have average intelligence compared to The Brain. Not much is known about him.
- Mrs. Powers (voiced by Susan Glover) is Brain's mother, who owns and runs the ice cream shop. She was originally shown with a brown complexion and brown hair, but she is later seen with a light complexion and blonde cream-colored hair.
- Mr. Pryce-Jones is an extremely strict teacher at Glenbrook Academy, where knowledge (and classwork) is unlimited. He is Mr. Ratburn's favorite teacher. Mr. Pryce-Jones is "irreplaceable" as he hadn't retired by the time Arthur and his classmates attended the Medieval Fair; Pryce-Jones was teaching a class of seemingly unbeatable rival students. Mr. Haney was impressed by Glenbrook's performance and hired Pryce-Jones to be a tutor for his niece and nephew.
- Nigel Charles Ratburn (Emil Ratburn in Season 1) (voiced by Arthur Holden) is Arthur's third- and fourth-grade teacher. He attended Glenbrook Academy, where his passion for learning and teaching was guided by his teacher, Mr. Pryce-Jones. Various running gags involving Mr. Ratburn include his strictness and love of homework, food, and dessert (especially cake). While his students are often chagrined at his hefty homework assignments and rules, they respect him greatly and are fond of him. He usually drives a small red convertible but also bought a minivan and canoe online. He is a fanatic of the series "Spooky-Poo!", a spoof of "Scooby-Doo". In the Season 22 episode "Mr. Ratburn and the Special Someone", Mr. Ratburn is revealed to be gay when he marries his same-sex partner, Patrick, in a wedding attended by his students. The episode, which also had lesbian actress Jane Lynch voice Mr. Ratburn's older sister and wedding planner Patty, was praised by LGBTQ groups as helping to normalize same-sex marriage, but attracted some controversy from conservative groups for displaying a same-sex wedding on a children's TV show. The episode was withheld from airing by Alabama Public Television (APT) and Arkansas Educational Television Network (AETN) as it showcased same-sex marriage.
- Rodentia Ratburn is Mr. Ratburn's sister, who once was a substitute teacher for Mr. Ratburn when he had laryngitis. The students initially liked the simplicity of her methods, but they proved way too childish for their age and were actually happy to have Mr. Ratburn back. In the later episode "Desk Wars", it is implied that she gave birth to a child, since Mr. Ratburn left for a phone call in which his sister told him he was an uncle.
- Mrs. Robertson is a Lakewood Elementary School Kindergarten teacher who is now retired. Her retirement diorama risked exposing Brain's secret that he was held back in kindergarten.
- Mr. Sanders is the grumpy building superintendent who works for the apartment building where the Frensky family lives.
- Mrs. Shmigaedy is one of Arthur's old babysitters, a moose who makes great cookies but is rather clumsy because of her large antlers.
- Mr. Sipple (voiced by Mark Camacho) is Arthur's next-door neighbor from Seasons 1–6, who enjoys grilling fish late at night and comes from a place where making faces on a bike means "bring me a cabbage". When he first appears, he was mowing his lawn and almost killed Toady Wartface. His name is revealed when D.W. learns to ride a bicycle. He moves out of the neighborhood in Season 6, and the Molinas move into his home.
- Dr. Sozio is the Read family dentist. A running gag involves parents forbidding children from putting their hands in his "mouth" (a plastic model displaying teeth). He is a bear and wears glasses.
- Miss Sweetwater is another third-grade teacher at Lakewood Elementary School. She does fun things with her students like singing songs (especially "I Like Fudge") while playing her guitar. In the early Arthur books, she was depicted as a cat, but in later books and the cartoon she was a rabbit.
- Mrs. Terracini is a grandmother to one of the children in D.W.'s class. She is very old and can neither see nor remember names very well, as she called the "Tibble Twins" the "Toggle Twins".
- Mrs. Tibble is the grandmother of Tommy and Timmy Tibble. She lives with the twins and has gray hair tied in a high bun. In early Arthur books, Mrs. Tibble is a human; however, many newer books and the cartoon depict her as a bear.
- Miss Tingley is Principal Haney's secretary and the assistant principal of Lakewood Elementary School. One time she was afraid of Miss Sweetwater's singing and Mr. Haney's sawing-in-half magic trick. She is an excellent public speaker compared to Mr. Haney, and sometimes rephrases and concludes his long, confusing speeches. In Season 20, she becomes the temporary principal after Mr. Haney resigned.
- Mrs. Tremello is a past substitute teacher of Mr. Ratburn's class. She was disliked by the class because she mumbled everything she said.
- Paige Turner (voiced by Katie Hutchinson) is the librarian in charge of the Elwood City Library (thus, her name is a pun). She is a rabbit who wears glasses and has numerous watches. Her hair color has changed from dark brown to light brown throughout the show's run. She is friendly, polite, and calm to library patrons. Nonetheless, a running gag is the widespread fear of her by library patrons due to worrying about their responsibilities with books and behaviors in the library.
- Mr. Walters is Fern's father. He appears much less frequently than Fern's mother and is first seen in the episode "Phony Fern", plus in the episode "Fernlets by Fern". He is a brown dog in a blue jacket. He teaches Fern about computers.
- Doria Walters is Fern's mother. She works for a real estate company. Her hair, which hides her ears, is a noticeably different style than Fern's. She has an outgoing personality and is very confident and encouraging to her daughter (who would prefer if she wasn't).
- Mrs. Wood is Perky's owner. Her grouchy dog, Perky (also known as "Jaws"), is Pal's mother.

== Guest stars ==
- Art Garfunkel appears in animation as a moose in two Arthur episodes: first in "The Ballad of Buster Baxter", and then later in "Elwood City Turns 100!" as one of the guests that Muffy invites to the play.
- Arthur Ganson appears in the episode "Muffy's Art Attack".
- The Backstreet Boys (Nick Carter, Howie Dorough, Brian Littrell, AJ McLean, and Kevin Richardson) appear in the movie special "Arthur, It's Only Rock 'N' Roll".
- Click and Clack, The Tappet Brothers (Tom and Ray Magliozzi) appear in the episode "Pick a Car, Any Car", where Arthur calls them about the family car to save it from the junkyard.
- Matt Damon appears in the episode "The Making of Arthur" as the host of a show "Postcards from You" (inspired by the "Postcards from You" segment used as the mid-show feature on Arthur since Season 11 and the feature on the second season of Postcards from Buster).
- Édgar Rentería appears in the episode "The Curse of the Grebes" as Bateria, a member of the Elwood City Grebes.
- Frank Gehry appears in the episode "Castles in the Sky", and helps the gang create a new tree house, although they don't know he is Frank Gehry until he gives them a signed photo of the Guggenheim Museum in Bilbao.
- Fred Rogers appears on the episode "Arthur Meets Mr. Rogers". Fred is an old friend of Jane Read; when he visits Arthur's family, Arthur is embarrassed because he and his friends think that Mister Rogers' Neighborhood is a "baby show". But when Mr. Rogers visits Arthur's class, they gain a new appreciation for the show.
- Idina Menzel appears in the episode "Shelter from the Storm" as Dr. Paula, a therapist who consoles Brain when he starts to have anxiety attacks after a hurricane hit Elwood City.
- Jack Prelutsky appears in the episode "I'm a Poet" as the judge of a poetry contest. At the end of the contest, he can't decide who's the winner, so he says: "I hate contests. You 'all' win."
- Johnny Damon appears in the episode "The Curse of the Grebes" as Playmon, a member of the Elwood City Grebes.
- John Lewis appears in the episode "Arthur Takes a Stand" when he speaks at Lakewood Elementary. He knew Mrs. MacGrady, who participated in the March on Washington for Jobs and Freedom with him, and joins a sit-in led by Arthur.
- Joshua Redman appears in the episode "My Music Rules" as Francine's mother's second cousin, twice removed, who they call "Uncle Josh". He gets invited over by Arthur and Francine. The episode ends with him and Yo-Yo Ma discussing the merits of different types of music.
- Koko Taylor appears in the episode "Big Horns George" and is The Brain's favorite blues musician.
- Lance Armstrong appears in "Room to Ride" as a pale, slightly aged rabbit, where he encourages Binky Barnes on his bike lane campaign. He reappears in "The Great MacGrady" and helps Francine feel less afraid about Mrs. MacGrady having cancer.
- Larry King appears in the live-action mid-show segment "And Now a Word From Us Kids" of the episode "Elwood City Turns 100!" and interviews the gang.
- Michelle Kwan appears in the episode "The Good Sport" as the hostess of the Athlete of the Year Award at Lakewood Elementary. It is also stated that she graduated from Lakewood Elementary.
- Mike Fincke appears in the episode "Buster Spaces Out", when Buster, Arthur, Francine, Muffy, George, and Carl are trying to launch a rocket. He speaks of his ordeal during the first EVA of Expedition 9 in 2004.
- Mike Timlin appears in the episode "The Curse of the Grebes" as Winlin, a member of the Elwood City Grebes.
- Ming Tsai of Simply Ming appears in the episode "What's Cooking?" as a judge for a kids' cooking contest at Arthur's school.
- Neil Gaiman appears in the episode "Falafelosophy", where he offers Sue Ellen advice about the graphic novel she is writing after meeting her at a falafel stand.
- Rodney Gilfry appears in the episode "Lights, Camera... Opera!" with a role in the Carmen opera that Muffy and Ed Crosswire attend.
- R. L. Stine appears as Buster's uncle Bob Baxter.
- Taj Mahal appears in the episode "Big Horns George" with Koko Taylor.
- Yo-Yo Ma appears in the episode "My Music Rules" with Joshua Redman. After D.W. attends his concert, she invites him to perform at the local library. The episode ends with him and Joshua Redman discussing the merits of different types of music.
- Alex Trebek appears as a fictional version of himself, Alex Lebek, as the host of the game show "Riddle Quest", on which Arthur is a contestant.

== Imaginary friends ==
- Maxine is W.D.'s imaginary friend. She appears as an elephant with an exotic purple hair style.
- Nadine Flumberghast (voiced by Hayley Reynolds) is D.W.'s imaginary friend. She appears as a brownish-yellow squirrel with small buck teeth and long, platinum-white blonde hair styled exotically in three pigtails atop her head. Unlike all the other characters, she has a tail. She represents D.W.'s conscience and usually appears when D.W. feels guilty, scared, or angry. Both D.W. and Nadine are aware that Nadine is imaginary. However, Kate, Mei-Lin, animals, and other characters' imaginary friends can see and communicate with her. In the episode DW's Time Trouble she is shown with D.W. when she is much older; in Baby Kate & the Imaginary Mystery, D.W. is shown to need Nadine less than before. She can create and destroy imaginary items with magic, as shown in Bleep!. Her last name was revealed to be "Flumberghast" in the episode, Read and Flumberghast.
- Rapty is Bud's imaginary friend. He is a big green dinosaur. Though he is actually a toy, Bud imagines him as real. In D.W. & Bud's Higher Purpose, it is shown that he can communicate and talk to Nadine.
- Platy is Ladonna's plush platypus who covers for Rapty as Bud's imaginary friend when he loses him in The Lost Dinosaur. Platy speaks in an Australian accent. He claims the only eggs he lay are "bad jokes".
- Waldo is Muffy's imaginary friend who she made when she was little and forgets about until she is 8. He is a plush elephant and smells, but the smell is a cologne in which all of the stuffed elephants are using.
- Squinty Magee was Francine's imaginary friend who was mentioned in one episode and is a crocodile. He told great stories, and they were all about her older sister, Catherine.
- Top Eye, Billy Snailgoat, Frumpus, Pudding Pal, and Junior were Buster's imaginary friends who were mentioned in one episode. They later all took a cruise to the Bermuda Triangle and vanished.
- Trini is Vicita's imaginary friend. She is a very intelligent and truthful fairy, and, in the episode Baby Kate in the Imaginary Mystery, where the imaginary friends team to find Nadine, she is the unelected leader of the group.
- Uncle Wormy is the Tibble Twins' imaginary friend. He is a giant slimy worm with one, red eye, and wears a belt with the initials "U.W." on it, standing for his own name.

== Animals and pets ==
- Amigo (voiced by Robert Brewster) is the Molinas' pet bulldog. Like Pal, Amigo has been shown to speak in some episodes. "Amigo" means "friend" (or "pal") in Spanish.
- Ben St. Bernardky is a St. Bernard who is the Chairpet of The Footwear Reserve.
- Bluebell is a white Alpine goat who belongs to Farmer Garvin in the Thanksgiving special "An Arthur Thanksgiving".
- Bobo is Clown Face's pet poodle. It only appeared in "Do You Believe in Magic", where Punchinello sprinkled itching powder on it and it ran away.
- Bowser is a Golden Retriever and James' dog who only appears as a dream in "D.W. Unties the Knot".
- Brain's dog is occasionally seen with The Brain, appearing in "And Now Let's Talk to Some Kids" and the title card.
- Bronco is a gray horse that Francine meets and rides in "Francine Frensky, Olympic Rider".
- Carrot Cake is a brown dog who belongs to Buster's aunt.
- Cookie is a Shih Tzu who Mr. Morris was grooming at the 1967 Annual Dog Show.
- Crusher is a pit bull that belongs to Rattles.
- Dr. Yowl (voiced by Richard Allen Campbell) is the distant cousin of Pal who lives in Pluto in "Carried Away".
- Fireball is a kitten from the Bionic Bunny show that belongs to the villain Hothead.
- Fur Elise is Dr. Frederique Fugue's pet cat from the episode "D.W.'s Furry Freakout" and is named after the song Für Elise by Beethoven.
- General Higgins is Ladonna's pet rat. He can do tricks, and is very smart for a rat.
- Goldie is a goldfish that belongs to Maria.
- Hans is a Dachshund who is the chauffeur of Mr. Toad, a sly business toad who participates in the Sock Market and often carries Mr. Toad to places on his back.
- Inky is a black cat who lives in 1428 Elm Street with Mr. and Mrs. Krueger and their daughter.
- Killer (voiced by Melissa Pirrera) is a stray dog found on Grandma Thora's porch. She has been to the pound many times and is known for being vicious. It is unknown who her previous owner was, but her current owner is Grandma Thora. Pal and Amigo were once afraid of her because of her bite, but her reputation was saved when she rescued Nemo by barking at some firefighters on a rainy day. Killer is shown in the very early books as Grandma Thora's dog, but was not introduced on the TV series until Season 9.
- Larry is a lop rabbit who is the preschool class pet that D.W. volunteers to take home during vacation week in "Bunny Trouble".
- Mittens is a bicolor cat who is put up for adoption in "Binky Can't Always Get What He Wants".
- Mr. Toad is a toad and stereotypical business investor who invested in "The Sock Market" as well as "The Lint Rush". He is married to Toady Wartface.
- Nemo (voiced by Greg Kramer) is Francine's tuxedo cat, and Pal's archenemy. However, they were friends in Nemo's debut episode. Arthur also disliked him at first, mistaking his playful antics for hostility due to his general dislike of cats. His facial features changed drastically after his debut. Before he was called "Nemo", he was called "Rose Petal" by Catherine, Francine's older sister. For some reason, even though Pal and Nemo were friends in "Francine and the Feline", they are enemies in every later episode except "Pet Projects".
- Nicky is a dog at the animal shelter near Chestnut Street in Elwood City. Despite living with the Reads for a time, his only appearance is in the Thanksgiving special "An Arthur Thanksgiving".
- One-Eyed Cornelius is a one-eyed cat that Binky adopted.
- Pal (voiced by Michael Yarmush seasons 1–2; Arthur Holden seasons 3–5; Simon Peacock from Season 6 onwards; Yvette Kaplan in "Arthur's Missing Pal"; with vocal effects by Frank Welker) is Arthur's pet puppy. His father was an English Setter. D.W. often refers to him as "Arthur's crazy dog". In earlier episodes, he was easily excited and often destroyed the house, but Arthur was able to train him. He is revealed to be able to speak in some episodes, but no one can understand him except Kate and most other animals. When he does speak, he speaks properly with an English accent in an adult voice, despite being a puppy.
- Pepe (voiced by Rick Jones) is an Italian flea friend of Pal and Kate who tells stories. He is first introduced in "Flea to Be You and Me", and later reappears in "Mei-Lin Takes a Stand" and "Around the World In 11 Minutes".
- Perky is Pal's mother who appears in the episode "Arthur's Pet Business". She was once infamous for harboring a grouchy attitude, which caused the mailman to nickname her "Jaws", but it might have been because she was pregnant. Along with Pal, Perky had two other puppies.
- Penny is an alligator who lives at the alligator sanctuary where Gussie works.
- Petunia is a friendly and excitable St. Bernard dog that Pal meets in the Thanksgiving special "An Arthur Thanksgiving." At first she chases him away, but then apologizes and offers him some of her leftovers. Later, she helps Pal to arrange a feast for the shelter dogs.
- Pixel is a Chihuahua and the pet dog of Capri DiVapida.
- Potato is a cat who belongs to the pet store owner. He is so fat that Muffy wonders whether the owner feeds him other cats. He is also lazy.
- Ragù is a red dog that Buster gives a tomato in "Buster's Green Thumb". He is named after the Italian meat-based sauce.
- Rory is a Labrador Retriever and the pet dog of Uncle Fred in Arthur's Perfect Christmas.
- Sadie is dog that was displaced by Hurricane Sadie and was later adopted by Kaylie Lamott.
- Sebastian Winkleplotz (voiced by Alan Cumming) is an award-winning poodle.
- Sirius the Super Dog is a superhero dog who is Supernova's sidekick.
- Snowball is D.W.'s "pet" snowball that disappeared one day. D.W. got very upset over it and thinks that Arthur stole it. In a later episode, D.W. thinks that she found her snowball, but it is lost once again. It is revealed that the second snowball was actually a sno-cone without syrup flavoring on it that Arthur ordered for D.W. to end her complaining about the first one. Later, in the episode "All Will Be Revealed", it is revealed that Nadine kept the snowball safe while aliens had accidentally taken a crochet ball.
- Snowball (not to be confused with D.W.'s snowball) is Muffy's pet hamster.
- Spanky is D.W.'s pet parakeet. He died in "So Long, Spanky" and was buried in a grave. He is seen again in "I'd Rather Read it Myself" as a bald eagle in D.W.'s imagination.
- Spot and Dot are a pair of Dalmatians who are fire dogs. They appeared in the episode "It Came From Beyond." In that episode, Amigo mentioned their names. It is possible that Spot and Dot are twins.
- Sugar and Spice are two ferocious dogs of Mr. Kone, who try to kill Pal in "Arthur's Missing Pal".
- Sunny is Killer's uncle.
- Toady Wartface is a toad formerly owned by D.W.; she was found near Spanky's grave and became D.W.'s pet, filling the void Spanky left. She is later released. She later appears in "The Great Sock Mystery" and "The Great Lint Rush", revealing that she now lives in the Reads' yard and has since married Mr. Toad.
- Tosca is a budgerigar who is Frederique Fugue's pet.
- Vladimir and Estragon are Mr. Ratburn's pet goldfish. Their first appearance was in "Cents-less", where their names were also revealed.
- Walter (voiced by Michael Caloz) is a deer that D.W. meets in the outdoors. D.W. wants to take Walter home, but her parents don't allow it. Walter is also seen in other episodes when D.W. daydreams or imagines her perfect world.
