= Tanaya Beatty =

Canadian actress (born 1991)

- Born: October 9, 1989 (age 36); Vancouver, British Columbia, Canada
- Education: Vancouver Film School
- Occupation: Actress
- Years active: 2011–present

Tanaya Beatty (born October 9, 1989) is a Canadian actress. She is known for her lead role as Annie in a film adaptation of Joseph Boyden's novel Through Black Spruce, as Avery in Yellowstone and Rachel Black in the movie adaptation of The Twilight Saga: Breaking Dawn - Part 1. She's also had starring roles as Jessica Finch in True Justice, Caitlin Janvier on the hit Canadian television series Arctic Air, and Sacagawea in the stalled production HBO miniseries Lewis and Clark. In 2016, she was added to the cast of NBC's The Night Shift as Dr. Shannon Rivera. In 2018.

== Early life ==
Tanaya Beatty was born on October 9, 1989, in Vancouver, British Columbia. Beatty's mother is of Awaetlatla First Nations descent while her father is South Asian. She was adopted and raised by a family of Italian descent. Beatty spent her childhood living in the interior of British Columbia, including Midway, Nelson, and Grand Forks.

== Career ==
In December 2010, Beatty graduated from the Vancouver Film School, successfully completing the full-time Essentials and Acting Program. Prior to this, she earned a certificate from a social work program.

Beatty has been included in the group of Native American actresses considered with "both the talent and the beauty to be an A-List", and was cast in the role of Sacagawea for the planned HBO miniseries, Lewis and Clark, which has been in development hell since 2016. In 2017, she appeared opposite Christian Bale and Wes Studi in Hostiles. She has the lead role in Through Black Spruce, an adaptation of Joseph Boyden's novel of the same name.

== Filmography ==
=== Film ===
Year	Film	Role	Notes
2011	The Twilight Saga: Breaking Dawn – Part 1	Rachel Black	
2013	Words and Pictures	Tammy	
2016	The Last Hunt	Crystal	Short film
2017	Hochelaga, Land of Souls	Akwi	
2017	Hostiles	Living Woman	
2018	Through Black Spruce	Annie	
2022	Crimes of the Future	Berst	
2022	God's Country	Gretchen	
2022	Murder at Yellowstone City	Violet Running Horse	
2024	The Birds Who Fear Death	Constance	
2026	In the Blink of an Eye	Neanderthal Mother	
2026	Breeder		Post-production

=== Television ===
Year	Title	Role	Notes
2012	True Justice	Jessica Finch	Recurring role; 7 episodes
2012	Blackstone	Sandra	Episode: "Hitchin"
2012–2014	Arctic Air	Caitlin Janvier	Main role; 18 episodes
2013	Continuum	Rebecca	Recurring role; 3 episodes
2014	The 100	Mel	Recurring role; 2 episodes
2016–2017	The Night Shift	Dr. Shannon Rivera	Main role (Season 3–4); 23 episodes
2018–2022	Yellowstone	Avery	Guest role (season 1), Recurring role (season 2, 4); 8 episodes
