= Through Black Spruce (film) =

2018 film by Don McKellar

- Theatrical release poster
- Directed by: Don McKellar
- Written by: Barbara Samuels
- Produced by: Tina Keeper; Robert Lantos; Barbara Samuels
- Starring: Tantoo Cardinal; Graham Greene; Tanaya Beatty; Parveen Kaur; Roseanne Supernault
- Cinematography: Douglas Koch
- Edited by: Lindsay Allikas
- Music by: Alaska B
- Production company: Serendipity Point Films
- Distributed by: Gravitas Ventures
- Release date: September 8, 2018 (TIFF)
- Running time: 111 minutes
- Country: Canada
- Languages: English, Cree

Through Black Spruce is a 2018 Canadian drama film, directed by Don McKellar. An adaptation of Joseph Boyden's novel Through Black Spruce, the film stars Brandon Oakes, Tantoo Cardinal, Graham Greene, Tanaya Beatty, Parveen Kaur and Roseanne Supernault. The film was shot primarily in Moosonee, Ontario.

== Plot ==
Annie Bird, a Cree woman from Moosonee, is the identical twin of Suzanne Bird, a model who had last been seen in Toronto before disappearing with her abusive boyfriend Gus. While living with her mother Lizette, Annie is close to her uncle Will, a hunter and former bush pilot. At the invitation of a friend, Annie travels to Toronto for a vacation, but stays behind to look for her sister. When Annie leaves for their vacation, a local Moosonee drug dealer named Marius takes this as an indication that one of her family members anticipates a need to go into hiding. Marius accuses Will of being a snitch and hires associates to have him followed.

In Toronto, Annie contacts Suzanne's modelling agency and collects the last paycheque that she was owed. The agency refers her to Jesse, the last photographer to undertake a project with Suzanne. The two meet while Jesse is debuting the resulting photo series at a local gallery. After describing the depression Suzanne was in, Jesse gives Annie the address where she last stayed. There, Annie meets Geeta, who is the other tenant. Geeta welcomes Annie and describes the shock of receiving the missing person's report for her roommate. Taking her to Suzanne's former room, Geeta encourages Annie to stay there for as long as necessary.

Meanwhile, Marius escalates his threats against Will's family and attempts to firebomb his house at night. The police chief dismisses Will's report due to his alcoholism and inability to provide a license plate number. Taking matters into his own hands, Will later aims a rifle at Marius from afar and fires a bullet into his head. Will escapes by plane to a remote island, and encounters a group of fellow Cree travelers after setting up a campsite. After being convinced that he cannot hide forever, Will returns to Moosonee. His sister Lizette tells him that Marius survived the shot to the head, albeit with brain damage. The police chief comes to speak with Will, and initially announces that the attempted murder is being ruled as a "biker hit". However, before driving off, he tells Will to have better aim next time.

Meanwhile, in Toronto, Annie begins a relationship with Jesse and offers to take Suzanne's place in an upcoming photo shoot. At a club that Suzanne used to frequent, Geeta introduces Annie to an acquaintance named Danny. Jesse warns her that Danny is a drug dealer, but Geeta continues to include him in their circle of friends. Annie looks at some of Suzanne's production stills and sees that signs of drug use have been photoshopped away. She berates Jesse for his dishonesty and prepares to leave Toronto. While she is telling Geeta, Danny corners the two of them and reveals that he has killed Gus in an effort to reclaim stolen drugs. While choking Annie, he accuses her of conspiring with her sister to keep the stash hidden.

Danny then comes to Moosonee in order to continue searching for Suzanne. He throws boiling water at Lizette and beats Will with a golf club. Before he can deliver the killing blow, Annie arrives with Will's rifle. She kills Marius and Danny in time to help carry her uncle to the hospital.

== Cast ==
- Tanaya Beatty as Annie Bird
- Brandon Oakes as Will
- Kiowa Gordon as Jesse
- Tantoo Cardinal as Mary-Lou
- Graham Greene as Leo
- Wesley French as Marius
- Parveen Kaur as Geeta
- Lily Gao as Lauren
- Roseanne Supernault as Eva
- Don McKellar as NOW reporter

== Release ==
Through Black Spruce premiered at the 2018 Toronto International Film Festival.

The film received two Canadian Screen Award nominations at the 7th Canadian Screen Awards in 2019, for Best Actor (Oakes) and Best Original Score (Alaska B). Alaska B won the award for Best Original Score. Cinematographer Douglas Koch also received a nomination for the Canadian Society of Cinematographers Award for Theatrical Feature Cinematography.

In the United States, the film was released on DVD and Blu-ray as Black Spruce on December 17, 2019.

== Reception ==
On review aggregator website Rotten Tomatoes, the film holds a 40% approval rating based on 10 reviews, with an average rating of 4.7/10. Norman Wilner of Now Toronto called the film "bland and uninvolving".

== See also ==
- Missing and murdered Indigenous women
- List of Canadian films
