= Rose Point =

Rose Point may refer to:

- Rose Point, Pennsylvania, an unincorporated community in east central Slippery Rock Township, Lawrence County, Pennsylvania, United States
- Rose Point, Massachusetts, a very small peninsula located in the town of Wareham, Massachusetts, United States
- Rose Point, Ontario, a community in the township of Seguin, Ontario
- Rose Point (Antarctica), a point on the coast of Marie Byrd Land, Antarctica
- Rose Point Swing Bridge, former name for Wasauksing Swing Bridge, between Rose Point and Parry Island, near Parry Sound, Ontario.
