= 2008 in Canadian literature =

This is a summary of the year 2008 in Canadian literature.

== Events ==
- January 8 - A television series based on Douglas Coupland's novel jPod debuts on CBC Television.
- February 29 - Paul Quarrington's 1987 novel King Leary wins the 2008 edition of Canada Reads.
- June 12 - Rawi Hage's 2006 novel De Niro's Game wins the 2008 International Dublin Literary Award.
- July 1 - Writers Maria Campbell, George Elliott Clarke and Audrey Thomas are inducted into the Order of Canada.
- November 11 - Joseph Boyden's novel Through Black Spruce wins the 2008 Scotiabank Giller Prize.
- November 18 - 2008 Governor General's Awards.

== Books ==
=== Fiction ===
- David Adams Richards, The Lost Highway
- André Alexis, Asylum
- David Bergen, The Retreat
- Joseph Boyden, Through Black Spruce
- Austin Clarke, More
- Anthony De Sa, Barnacle Love
- Cory Doctorow, Little Brother
- Emma Donoghue, The Sealed Letter
- Marina Endicott, Good to a Fault
- Steven Galloway, The Cellist of Sarajevo
- Bill Gaston, The Order of Good Cheer
- Rawi Hage, Cockroach
- Kenneth J. Harvey, Blackstrap Hawco
- Maggie Helwig, Girls Fall Down
- Mark Anthony Jarman, My White Planet
- Ibi Kaslik, The Angel Riots
- Patrick Lane, Red Dog, Red Dog
- Pasha Malla, The Withdrawal Method
- Andrew Pyper, The Killing Circle
- Paul Quarrington, The Ravine
- Nino Ricci, The Origin of Species
- Robert J. Sawyer, Identity Theft and Other Stories
- Mary Swan, The Boys in the Trees
- Miriam Toews, The Flying Troutmans

=== Non-fiction ===
- Margaret Atwood, Payback: Debt and the Shadow Side of Wealth
- Stephen Clarkson, My Life as a Dame: The Personal and the Political in the Writings of Christina McCall
- Charles Foran, Join the Revolution, Comrade
- Mark Frutkin, Erratic North: A Vietnam Draft Resister's Life in the Canadian Bush
- Stephen Henighan, A Report on the Afterlife of Culture
- Val Ross, Robertson Davies: A Portrait in Mosaic
- Norman Snider, The Roaring Eighties and Other Good Times
- Drew Hayden Taylor, Me Sexy: An Exploration of Native Sex and Sexuality

=== Poetry ===
- R. M. Vaughan, Troubled

== Deaths ==
- February 17 - Val Ross, writer and journalist
- June 11 - James Reaney, novelist
- July 14 - Lawrence Ytzhak Braithwaite, writer and musician
