= List of The Twilight Saga cast members =

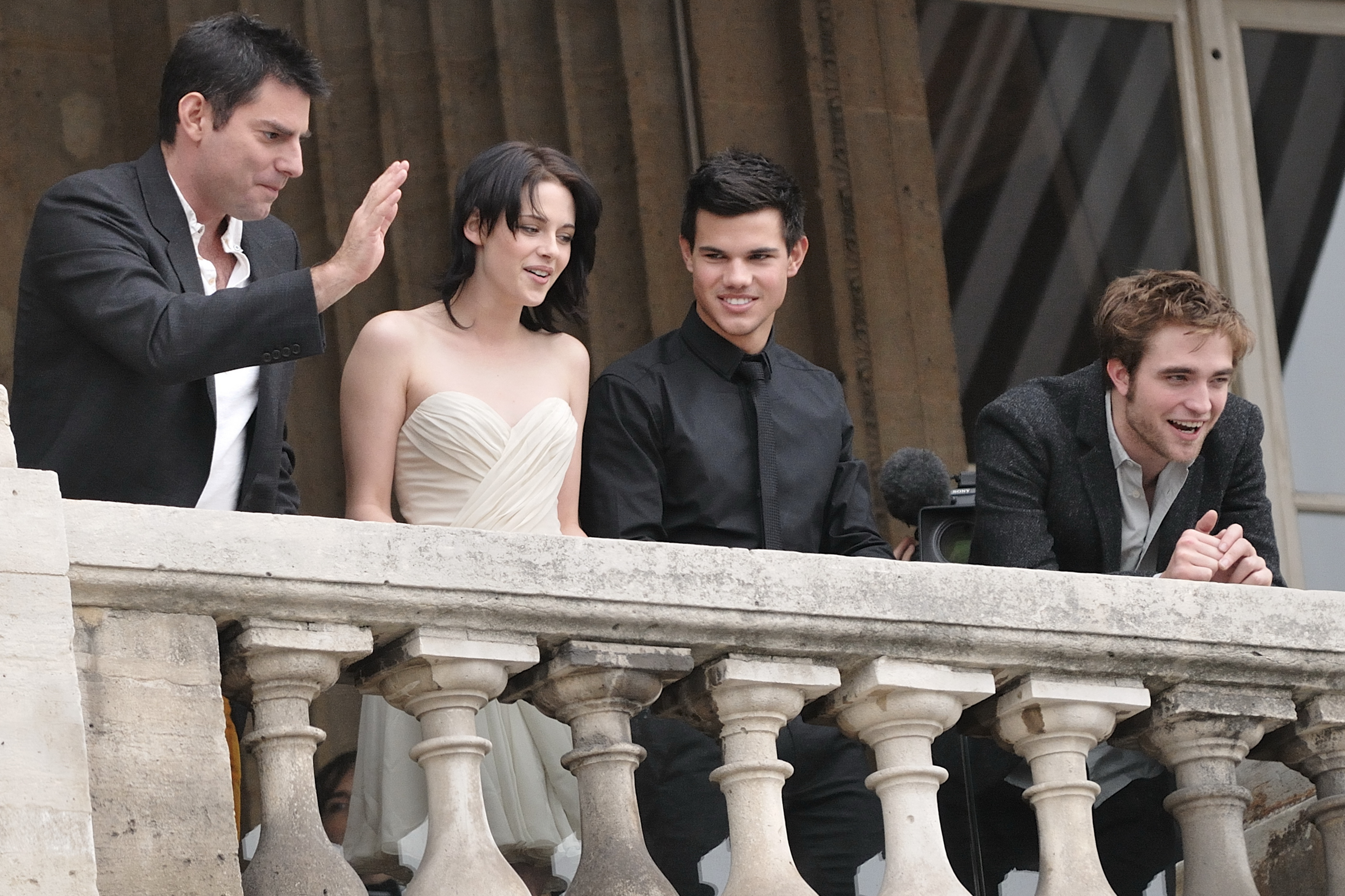
(Left to right) Director Chris Weitz, Stewart, Lautner, and Pattinson attending the photocall for New Moon on November 10, 2009, in Paris, France

This is a list of the cast members from The Twilight Saga film series, which is based on the novels by Stephenie Meyer. The main stars of the films are Kristen Stewart as Bella Swan, Robert Pattinson as Edward Cullen, and Taylor Lautner as Jacob Black. Twilight (2008) is based on the New York Times best selling novel of the same name (2005) and was directed by Catherine Hardwicke. The second film, The Twilight Saga: New Moon (2009) is based on the first book's sequel (2006). It was directed by Chris Weitz. The third film, The Twilight Saga: Eclipse, directed by David Slade, was released on June 30, 2010. and is based on the third installment in the series (2007). The filming of Breaking Dawn Part 1 started on November 1, 2010. The Twilight Saga: Breaking Dawn – Part 1 (commonly referred to as Breaking Dawn – Part 1) released in theatres on November 18, 2011, and released to DVD on February 11, 2012, in the United States. The film grossed over $712 million worldwide. The Twilight Saga: Breaking Dawn – Part 2 (commonly referred to as Breaking Dawn – Part 2) was released on November 16, 2012, by Lionsgate in the United States, in consequence of the merger between Lionsgate and Summit Entertainment. Both Breaking Dawn films were directed by Bill Condon. The film (101 days in release) was a box-office success, grossing over $829 million worldwide, becoming the 34th highest-grossing film, the 6th highest-grossing film of 2012, and the highest-grossing film of the Twilight series.

== Cast ==
List indicators

This section includes characters who have appeared in the film series.

- An empty grey cell indicates the character was not in the film.
- ^{A} indicates an appearance through archival footage or audio.
- ^{U} indicates an uncredited appearance.

Character	Twilight	New Moon	Eclipse	Breaking Dawn – Part 1	Breaking Dawn – Part 2
Character	2008	2009	2010	2011	2012
=== Principal characters ===
Isabella "Bella" Cullen (née Swan)	Kristen Stewart	Kristen Stewart	Kristen Stewart	Kristen Stewart	Kristen Stewart
Edward Cullen	Robert Pattinson	Robert Pattinson	Robert Pattinson	Robert Pattinson	Robert Pattinson
Jacob Black	Taylor Lautner	Taylor Lautner	Taylor Lautner	Taylor Lautner	Taylor Lautner
Charlie Swan	Billy Burke	Billy Burke	Billy Burke	Billy Burke	Billy Burke
Carlisle Cullen	Peter Facinelli	Peter Facinelli	Peter Facinelli	Peter Facinelli	Peter Facinelli
Esme Cullen	Elizabeth Reaser	Elizabeth Reaser	Elizabeth Reaser	Elizabeth Reaser	Elizabeth Reaser
Alice Cullen	Ashley Greene	Ashley Greene	Ashley Greene	Ashley Greene	Ashley Greene
Emmett Cullen	Kellan Lutz	Kellan Lutz	Kellan Lutz	Kellan Lutz	Kellan Lutz
Rosalie Hale	Nikki Reed	Nikki Reed	Nikki Reed	Nikki Reed	Nikki Reed
Jasper Hale	Jackson Rathbone	Jackson Rathbone	Jackson Rathbone	Jackson Rathbone	Jackson Rathbone
Renesmee Cullen (Note: Actresses Christie Burke, Rachel St. Gelais, Sierra Pitkin, and Eliza Faria also have bit parts playing Renesmee at various ages in Breaking Dawn.)					Mackenzie Foy
=== Amazon Coven ===
Senna					Tracey Heggins
Zafrina					Judi Shekoni
=== Denali Coven ===
Laurent	Edi Gathegi	Edi Gathegi			
Eleazar				Christian Camargo	Christian Camargo
Carmen				Mía Maestro	Mía Maestro
Irina				Maggie Grace	Maggie Grace
Kate				Casey LaBow	Casey LaBow
Tanya				MyAnna Buring	MyAnna Buring
Vasilii				Billy Wagenseller	Billy Wagenseller
Sasha					Andrea Powell
=== Egyptian Coven ===
Amun					Omar Metwally
Kebi					Andrea Gabriel
Benjamin					Rami Malek
Tia					Angela Sarafyan
=== French Coven ===
Henri					Amadou Ly
Yvette					Janelle Froehlich
=== Irish Coven ===
Maggie					Marlane Barnes
Siobhan					Lisa Howard
Liam					Patrick Brennan
=== Romanian Coven ===
Stefan					Guri Weinberg
Vladimir					Noel Fisher
=== Volturi ===
Demetri		Charlie Bewley	Charlie Bewley	Charlie Bewley	Charlie Bewley
Felix		Daniel Cudmore	Daniel Cudmore	Daniel Cudmore	Daniel Cudmore
Alec		Cameron Bright	Cameron Bright		Cameron Bright
Jane		Dakota Fanning	Dakota Fanning		Dakota Fanning
Aro		Michael Sheen		Michael Sheen	Michael Sheen
Caius		Jamie Campbell Bower		Jamie Campbell Bower	Jamie Campbell Bower
Marcus		Christopher Heyerdahl		Christopher Heyerdahl	Christopher Heyerdahl
Heidi		Noot Seear			
Santiago					Lateef Crowder
=== American Nomads ===
Victoria	Rachelle Lefevre	Rachelle Lefevre	Bryce Dallas Howard	Rachelle Lefevre^{A}	
James	Cam Gigandet				
Garrett					Lee Pace
Mary					Toni Trucks
Peter					Erik Odom
Charlotte					Valorie Curry
Randall					Bill Tangradi
=== European Nomads ===
Alistair					Joe Anderson
=== Other vampires ===
Bree Tanner			Jodelle Ferland		
Cold One			Peter Murphy		
Cold Woman (Note: In The Twilight Saga: Eclipse, Monique Ganderton played the role of the "Cold Woman". However, the name of the character was changed to "Beautiful Vampiress".)			Monique Ganderton		
Lucy			Kirsten Zien		
Maria			Catalina Sandino Moreno		
Nettie			Leah Gibson		
Riley Biers			Xavier Samuel		
Huilen					Marisa Quinn
=== Half-vampires ===
Nahuel					J.D. Pardo
Renesemee Cullen					Mackenzie Foy
=== Shape-shifters ===
Sam Uley	Solomon Trimble (Note: Solomon Trimble was credited as "Jacob's friend" in the Twilight film, but was widely recognized as playing the part of Sam.)	Chaske Spencer	Chaske Spencer	Chaske Spencer	Chaske Spencer
Embry Call	Krys Hyatt^{U} (Note: Krys Hyatt was recognized as playing the part of Embry in the Twilight film, though his role was uncredited.)	Kiowa Gordon	Kiowa Gordon	Kiowa Gordon	Kiowa Gordon
Quil Ateara		Tyson Houseman	Tyson Houseman	Tyson Houseman	Tyson Houseman
Paul Lahote		Alex Meraz	Alex Meraz	Alex Meraz	Alex Meraz
Jared Cameron		Bronson Pelletier	Bronson Pelletier	Bronson Pelletier	Bronson Pelletier
Leah Clearwater			Julia Jones	Julia Jones	Julia Jones
Seth Clearwater			Booboo Stewart	Booboo Stewart	Booboo Stewart
Taha Aki			Byron Chief-Moon		
=== Humans ===
Billy Black	Gil Birmingham	Gil Birmingham	Gil Birmingham	Gil Birmingham	
Jessica Stanley (Note: The characters Jessica Stanley and Lauren Mallory from the book were combined to create the role of Jessica, which was played by Anna Kendrick.)	Anna Kendrick	Anna Kendrick	Anna Kendrick	Anna Kendrick	
Mike Newton	Michael Welch	Michael Welch	Michael Welch	Michael Welch	
Angela Webber	Christian Serratos	Christian Serratos	Christian Serratos	Christian Serratos	
Eric Yorkie	Justin Chon	Justin Chon	Justin Chon	Justin Chon	
Renée Dwyer	Sarah Clarke		Sarah Clarke	Sarah Clarke	
Phil Dwyer	Matt Bushell			Ty Olsson	
Diner Customer / Wedding Guest	Stephenie Meyer			Stephenie Meyer	
Tyler Crowley	Gregory Tyree Boyce				
Mr. Molina	José Zúñiga				
Waylon Forge	Ned Bellamy				
Cora	Ayanna Berkshire				
Waitress	Katie Powers				
Ms. Cope	Trish Egan				
Emily Young		Tinsel Korey	Tinsel Korey	Tinsel Korey	Tinsel Korey
Harry Clearwater		Graham Greene			
Gianna		Justine Wachsberger			
Sue Clearwater			Alex Rice	Alex Rice	Alex Rice
Royce King II			Jack Huston		
John			Ben Geldreich		
Third Wife			Mariel Belanger		
Vera			Sabrina Frank		
Rachel Black				Tanaya Beatty	
Claire Young				Sienna Joseph	
Kaure				Carolina Virguez	
Gustavo				Sebastiao Lemos	
Bianca				Ali Faulkner	
Kim				Caitlin Mooney Fu	
J. Jenks					Wendell Pierce
