= Parveen Kaur =

Parveen Kaur may refer to:

- Parveen Kaur (Canadian actress) (born 1988)
- Parveen Kaur (Indian actress)
