= Francis Pegahmagabow =

Canadian First Nations soldier, politician and activist

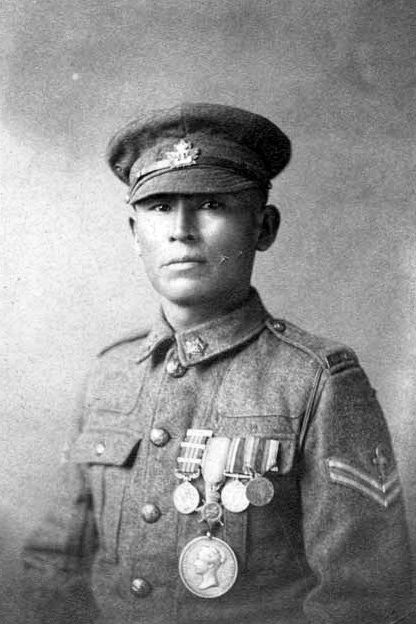
- Pegahmagabow shortly after World War I
- Born: March 9, 1891; Parry Sound, Ontario
- Died: August 5, 1952 (aged 61); Parry Sound, Ontario
- Military career
- Allegiance: Canada
- Branch: Canadian Expeditionary Force
- Service years: 1914–1919
- Rank: Warrant Officer
- Nickname: "Peggy"
- Conflicts: First World War: Second Battle of Ypres; Battle of the Somme (WIA); Battle of Passchendaele; Second Battle of Passchendaele; Hundred Days Offensive; Second Battle of the Somme; Battle of the Scarpe
- Awards: Military Medal & Two bars; 1914–15 Star; British War Medal; Victory Medal National Historic Person
- Other work: Chief of Wasauksing First Nation (1921–25 and 1942–45); Tribal councillor (1933–36); Supreme chief of the Native Independent Government

Francis Pegahmagabow (/ˌpɛɡəˈmæɡəboʊ/ peg-ə-MAG-ə-boh; March 9, 1891 – August 5, 1952) was an Ojibwe soldier, politician and activist in Canada. He was the most highly decorated Indigenous soldier in Canadian military history and the most effective sniper of the First World War. Three times awarded the Military Medal and seriously wounded, he was an expert marksman and scout. Credited with killing 378 Germans and capturing 300 more, he is considered as one of the deadliest snipers in history. Later in life, he served as chief and a councillor for the Wasauksing First Nation, and as an activist and leader in several First Nations organizations. He corresponded with and met other noted aboriginal figures including Fred Loft, Jules Sioui, Andrew Paull and John Tootoosis.

== Early life ==
Francis Pegahmagabow was born on March 9, 1891, (Note: Other sources have given Pegahmagabow's birth year as 1888 or 1891.) on what is now the Shawanaga First Nation reserve in Nobel, Ontario. In Ojibwe his name was Binaaswi ("the wind that blows off"). When Francis was three years old, his father died and his mother subsequently left him to return to her home in the Henvey Inlet First Nation. He was raised by elder Noah Nebimanyquod and grew up in Shawanaga, where he learned traditional skills such as hunting, fishing, and traditional medicine. Pegahmagabow practiced a mix of Catholicism and Anishinaabe spirituality.

In January 1912 Pegahmagabow received financial aid for room and board to complete his public school education with the help of the Parry Sound crown attorney Walter Lockwood Haight. He had left school at the age of 12 and worked at lumber camps and fishing camps; he eventually became a marine firefighter.

== Military career ==
Following the outbreak of World War I, Pegahmagabow volunteered for service with the Canadian Expeditionary Force in August 1914, despite Canadian government discrimination that initially excluded minorities. He was posted to the 23rd Canadian Regiment (Northern Pioneers). After joining the Canadian force he was based at CFB Valcartier. While there he decorated his army tent with traditional symbols including a Caribou, the symbol of his clan. In early October 1914 he was deployed overseas with the 1st Canadian Infantry Battalion of the 1st Canadian Division—the first contingent of Canadian troops sent to fight in Europe. His companions there nicknamed him "Peggy".

In April 1915, Pegahmagabow fought in the Second Battle of Ypres, where the Germans used chlorine gas for the first time on the Western Front; it was during this battle that he began to establish a reputation as a sniper and scout. Following the battle he was promoted to lance corporal. His battalion took part in the Battle of the Somme in 1916, during which he was wounded in the left leg. He recovered in time to return to the 1st Battalion as they moved to Belgium. He received the Military Medal for carrying messages along the lines during these two battles. Initially, his commanding officer, Lieutenant Colonel Frank Albert Creighton, had nominated him for the Distinguished Conduct Medal, citing his disregard for danger and "faithfulness to duty", but it was downgraded.

On November 6/7, 1917, Pegahmagabow earned a Bar to his Military Medal for his actions in the Second Battle of Passchendaele. During the fighting, Pegahmagabow's battalion was given the task of launching an attack at Passchendaele. By this time, he had been promoted to the rank of corporal and during the battle he was recorded playing an important role as a link between the units on the 1st Battalion's flank. When the battalion's reinforcements became lost, Pegahmagabow was instrumental in guiding them and ensuring that they reached their allocated spot in the line.

On August 30, 1918, during the Battle of the Scarpe, Pegahmagabow was involved in fighting off a German attack at Orix Trench near Upton Wood. His company was almost out of ammunition and in danger of being surrounded. Pegahmagabow braved heavy machine gun and rifle fire by going into no man's land and brought back enough ammunition to enable his post to carry on and assist in repulsing heavy enemy counter-attacks. For these efforts he received a second Bar to his Military Medal, becoming one of only 39 Canadians to receive this honour.

The war ended in November 1918 and in 1919 Pegahmagabow was invalided back to Canada. He had served for almost the whole war, and had built a reputation as a skilled marksman. Using the much-maligned Ross rifle, he was credited with killing 378 Germans and capturing 300 more. By the time of his discharge, he had served in the appointment of sergeant-major and had been awarded the 1914–15 Star, the British War Medal, and the Victory Medal.

== Political life ==
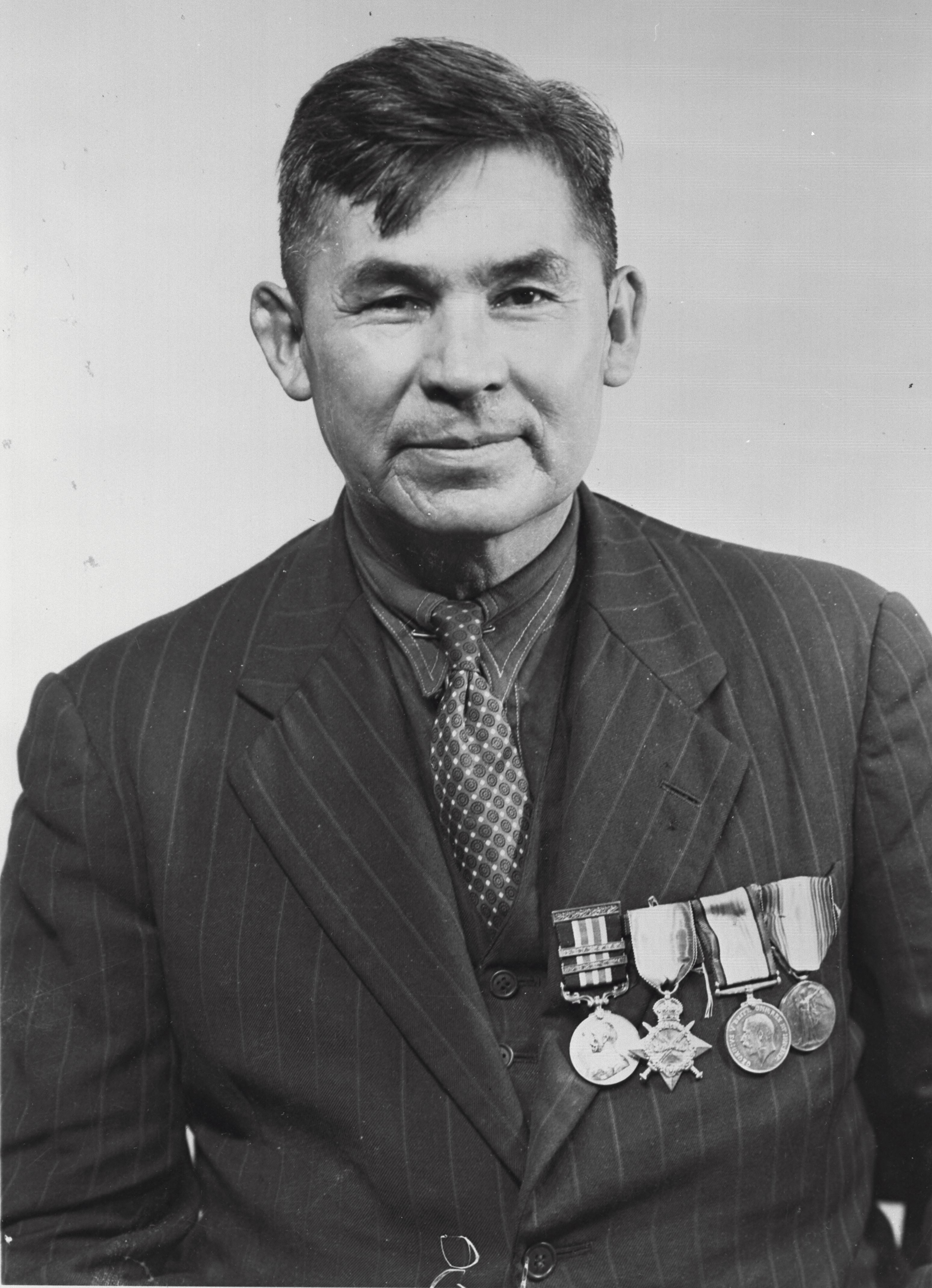
Pegahmagabow in 1945 while attending a conference in Ottawa where the National Indian Government was formed.

Upon his return to Canada he continued to serve in the Canadian Militia as a member of The Northern Pioneers (known today as the Algonquin Regiment) as a non-permanent active member. Following in his father's and grandfather's footsteps, he was elected chief of the Parry Island Band from February 1921. Once in office he caused a schism in the band after he wrote a letter calling for certain individuals and those of mixed race to be expelled from the reserve. He was re-elected in 1924 and served until he was deposed via an internal power struggle in April 1925. Before the motion could go through, Pegahmagabow resigned. A decade later, he was appointed councillor from 1933 to 1936. In 1933 the Department of Indian Affairs (DIA) changed its policies and forbade First Nation chiefs from corresponding with the DIA. They directed that all correspondence, as of the spring of 1933, go through the Indian agent. This gave huge power to the agent, something that grated on Pegahmagabow as he did not get along with his own agent, John Daly. First Nation members who served in the army during World War I were particularly active as political activists. They had travelled the world, earned the respect of the comrades in the trenches, and refused to be sidelined by the newly empowered Indian agent. Historian Paul Williams termed these advocates "returned soldier chiefs", and singled out a few, including Pegahmagabow, as being especially active. This caused intense disagreements with Daly and eventually led to Pegahmagabow being deposed as chief. Daly and other agents who came in contact with Pegahmagabow were incredibly frustrated by his attempts, in his words, to free his people from "white slavery". The Indian agents labelled him a "mental case" and strove to sideline him and his supporters.

In addition to the power struggle between the Indian council and the DIA with which Pegahmagabow took issue, he was a constant agitator over the islands in Georgian Bay of the Huron. The Regional First Nation governments claimed the islands as their own and Pegahmagabow and other chiefs tried in vain to get recognition of their status.

During World War II Pegahmagabow worked as a guard at a munitions plant near Nobel, Ontario, and was a Sergeant-major in the local militia. In 1943, he became the Supreme Chief of the Native Independent Government, an early First Nations organization.

== Family ==
A married father of six children, Pegahmagabow died on the Parry Island reserve in 1952 at the age of 61. He is a member of the Indian Hall of Fame at the Woodland Centre in Brantford, Ontario, and his memory is also commemorated on a plaque honouring him and his regiment on the Rotary and Algonquin Regiment Fitness Trail in Parry Sound. He was honoured by the Canadian Forces by naming the 3rd Canadian Ranger Patrol Group HQ Building at CFB Borden after him.

== Legacy ==
Canadian journalist Adrian Hayes wrote a biography of Pegahmagabow titled Pegahmagabow: Legendary Warrior, Forgotten Hero, published in 2003, and another titled Pegahmagabow: Life-Long Warrior, published in 2009. Canadian novelist Joseph Boyden's 2005 novel Three Day Road was inspired in part by Pegahmagabow. The novel's protagonist is a fictional character who, like Pegahmagabow, serves as a military sniper during World War I, although Pegahmagabow also appears as a minor character.

A life-sized bronze statue of Pegahmagabow was erected in his honour on National Aboriginal Day, June 21, 2016, in Parry Sound, near Georgian Bay. The figure has an eagle on one arm, a Ross rifle slung from its shoulder, and a caribou at its feet, representing the Caribou Clan that Pegahmagabow belonged to. The Eagle was his spirit animal. The artist Tyler Fauvelle spent eight months sculpting the statue, which spent a further year in casting. Fauvelle chose to erect it in Parry Sound rather than Wasauksing to reach a larger public and educate them on the contributions of First Nations people to Canada.

Sounding Thunder, The Song of Francis Pegahmagabow is a musical that has been touring Canada since 2018.

In 2019, the history-themed power metal band Sabaton released a song dedicated to Pegahmagabow, titled "A Ghost in the Trenches", on their album The Great War.

Pegahmagabow is the focus of the biographical short story "Peggy" by David A. Robertson in the 2019 graphic novel anthology This Place: 150 Years Retold.

Binaaswi was one of eight 2020 finalists for the $5 bill in Canada's eighth series of banknotes.

Pegahmagabow was portrayed by Keenan Keeshig in the 2022 movie The Ace and the Scout (also known as Battle for the Western Front).

The Two Battles of Francis Pegahmagabow is a play launched in 2024 by Edmonton's Shadow Theatre.

=== Awards ===
- He was first awarded the Military Medal while fighting at the second battle of Ypres, Festubert and Givenchy, for courage above fire in getting important messages through to the rear.
- Earned his first bar to the Military Medal at the Battle of Passchendaele.
- His second bar to the Military Medal came at the battle of The Scarpe, in 1918. Only 38 other Canadian men received the honour of two bars.
- The 1914–15 Star
- The British War Medal
- The Victory Medal

In 2003 the Pegahmagabow family donated his medals and chief head dress to the Canadian War Museum where they can be seen as of 2010 as part of the World War I display. While researching his 2005 novel Three Day Road, Boyden was asked about why he thought that Pegahmagabow had not received a higher award like the Distinguished Conduct Medal or the Victoria Cross. Boyden speculated it was due to Pegahmagabow being a First Nations soldier, and that there may have been jealousy on the part of some officers who he felt might have been suspicious of the number of Germans Pegahmagabow claimed to have shot because he did not use an observer while sniping.

== See also ==
- Tommy Prince (October 25, 1915 – November 25, 1977) was one of Canada's most decorated First Nations soldiers, serving in World War II and the Korean War.

== Bibliography ==
Notes

References

- Bethune, Brian (May 30, 2005). "Windigo in the First World War". Maclean's. Archived from the original on April 3, 2012.
- Brownlie, Robin (2003). A Fatherly Eye: Indian Agents, Government Power, and Aboriginal Resistance in Ontario, 1918–1939 (2003 ed.). University of Toronto Press. ISBN 978-0-19-541784-5. Archived from the original on 2021-04-16. - Total pages: 204
- Canadian Forces (August 2006). "Ranger headquarters named after Canada's most decorated aboriginal soldier". Canadian Forces. Archived from the original on June 10, 2011.
- Veterans Affairs Canada (2010). "Native Soldiers – Foreign Battlefields – A Peaceful Man". Veterans Affairs Canada. Archived from the original on August 25, 2007.
- Canadian War Museum (August 27, 2003). "Cpl. Francis Pegahmagabow's Medals donated to the Canadian War Museum". pub. Archived from the original on July 28, 2011.
- Drainie, Bronwyn (March 2015). "Review: Three Day Road". Quill & Quire. Archived from the original on 2015-03-14.
- Hayes, Adrian (2005). Parry Sound: Gateway to Northern Ontario (2005 ed.). Dundurn Press Ltd. ISBN 978-1-896219-91-2. Archived from the original on 2021-11-05. - Total pages: 253
- Hayes, Adrian (2003). Pegahmagabow: Legendary Warrior, Forgotten Hero (2003 ed.). Fox Meadow Creations. ISBN 978-0-9681452-8-9.- Total pages: 95
- Hele, Karl (2014-05-28). "Francis Pegahmagabow: controversial hero". Anishinabek News. Archived from the original on 2015-04-12.
- Koennecke, Franz M. (2008). "Francis Pegahmagabow". Archived from the original on 2021-11-05.
- Mackey, Doug (December 12, 2003). "Legendary Soldier – Native Leader". Community Voices. Past Forward. Archived from the original on November 5, 2021.
- Pegler, Martin (2006). Out of Nowhere: A History of the Military Sniper (2006 ed.). Osprey Publishing. ISBN 978-1-84603-140-3. - Total pages: 352
- Powers, Lucas (2016-06-21). "WW I hero Francis Pegahmagabow given Aboriginal Day honour". CBC News. Archived from the original on 2016-06-22.
- Schmalz, Peter S. (1991). The Ojibwa of Southern Ontario (1991 ed.). University of Toronto Press. ISBN 978-0-8020-6778-4. "The Ojibwa of Southern Ontario." - Total pages: 334
- Wyile, Herb (2007). Speaking in The Past Tense: Canadian Novelists on Writing Historical Fiction (2007 ed.). Wilfrid Laurier University Press. ISBN 978-0-88920-511-6. Archived from the original on 2021-11-05. - Total pages: 327
