= Battle of the Bulge (1991 film) =

1991 Canadian short film

- Directed by: Arlene Hazzan Green
- Written by: Arlene Hazzan Green
- Produced by: Arlene Hazzan Green
- Starring: Suzanne Cyr; Deborah Kirshenbaum
- Cinematography: Douglas Koch
- Production company: Artizzan Films
- Release date: 1991
- Running time: 24 minutes
- Country: Canada
- Language: English

Battle of the Bulge is a Canadian comedy short film, directed by Arlene Hazzan Green and released in 1991. An exploration of women's body image issues, the film stars Suzanne Cyr as Victoria, a woman whose obsession with thinness results in the creation of Vanna (Deborah Kirshenbaum), a significantly fatter alter ego who shows up to taunt Victoria whenever she looks in a mirror or eats food, with their battle of wills building until breaking out into a food fight.

The film received selected film festival screenings, including winning the awards for Best Drama Under 30 Minutes and Best Script at the 1992 Yorkton Film Festival, but was distributed primarily as an episode of Global Television Network's First Time Producers Series of short films by emerging directors.

The film won the Genie Award for Best Live Action Short Drama at the 13th Genie Awards.
