= White Night (2017 film) =

- Film poster
- Directed by: Sonny Atkins; P.H. Bergeron; Brian Hamilton; Matt Purdy; Dan Slater
- Written by: Matt Purdy; Dan Slater
- Produced by: Marcus Le; Matt Levine; Jake Raymond
- Starring: Adam Booth; Natalie Brown; Jonathan Keltz; Sara Mitich; Parveen Kaur
- Cinematography: Danny Dunlop; Nick Kachibaia; Adam Madrzyk
- Edited by: Dan Slater
- Music by: Dillon Baldassero
- Production companies: Multiname Productions; Torch Head Productions
- Release date: April 2, 2017 (UK)
- Running time: 86 minutes
- Country: Canada
- Language: English

White Night is a Canadian anthology film released in 2017. It comprises six stories set during Toronto's Nuit Blanche arts festival. Musical interludes are provided by Stephen Joffe and the indie bands Beams and Birds of Bellwood.

== Cast ==
- Jonathan Keltz as Sully
- Sara Mitich as Violet
- Natalie Brown as Stacey
- Adam Booth as Frank
- Kimberly Laferriere as Melanie
- Parveen Kaur as Emily
- Darrell Faria as Ryley
- Eric Hicks as Geoff
- Devan Cohen as Dillon
- Dennis Long as Thief
- Tara Yelland as Sophie
- Tommy Matejka as Allen
- Wayne Burns as Ryan
- Stephen Joffe as Stevie
- Darren Eisnor as Jimmy
- James Chillingworth as Firing Boss
- Jason Szwimer as Kyle
- Christina Notto as October
- Jake Raymond as Brock
- Sugith Varughese as Emily's Dad

== Reception ==
Critical reception to White Night was lukewarm.

Now's Norman Wilner compared the film's style to the works of Richard Linklater, but felt that its editing could have been tighter.

Bruce DeMara of the Toronto Star enjoyed White Night's music and cinematography, though thought that it seemed like "an extended promo" for Nuit Blanche, and at times found it "a bit wearing, just like the real event."

Gayle MacDonald of The Globe and Mail gave it 2 1/2 stars out of 4, praising the performance of Darrell Faria, but writing "the film doesn't quite pull off the challenge of fusing the visions of five filmmakers into one cohesive whole."
