= American Hangman =

2019 Canadian thriller film

- Film poster
- Directed by: Wilson Coneybeare
- Written by: Wilson Coneybeare
- Produced by: Wilson Coneybeare; Meredith Fowler; Jim Sternberg
- Starring: Donald Sutherland; Vincent Kartheiser
- Cinematography: Mark Irwin
- Edited by: Michael Pierro
- Music by: Dillon Baldassero
- Production company: Hangman Justice Productions
- Distributed by: Aqute Media
- Release date: January 4, 2019
- Running time: 99 minutes
- Country: Canada
- Language: English

American Hangman is a 2019 Canadian thriller film written and directed by Wilson Coneybeare and starring Donald Sutherland and Vincent Kartheiser. The film premiered on Netflix on January 4, 2019, and showed in theatres in Canada on March 8, 2019.

== Synopsis ==
An unidentified man posts a livestreaming on social media showing that he has kidnapped two strangers and intends to kill one before the day is out. His intention is to hold a capital "trial" online. As the authorities recognize what's happening, it becomes apparent that the online public is going to act as judge and jury.

== Cast ==
- Donald Sutherland as Judge Straight
- Vincent Kartheiser as Henry David Cole
- Oliver Dennis as Lieutenant Roy
- Al Sapienza as Detective Steptoe
- Paul Braunstein as Ron
- Lucia Walters as Harper Grant
- Joanne Boland as Stokely
- Jess Salgueiro as Darnley
- Parveen Kaur as Kaitlyn
- Genelle Williams as Barbara
- Alex Crowther as Josh Harkridge

== Reception ==
The film has a 44% rating on Rotten Tomatoes, based on nine reviews with an average rating of 6.6/10. Jeffrey M. Anderson of Common Sense Media awarded the film three stars out of five. Bobby LePire of Film Threat awarded the film seven and a half stars out of ten.
