= Douglas Koch =

Canadian cinematographer

- Education: Ryerson Polytechnical Institute
- Occupation: Cinematographer

Douglas Koch is a Canadian cinematographer who has won honours at the Canadian Screen Awards and Canadian Music Video Awards.

Koch is from Vancouver and studied film at Ryerson Polytechnical Institute in Toronto, finishing in 1983. He went on to shoot music videos for artists such as Anne Murray and Sarah McLachlan, winning a cinematography award at the MuchMusic Video Awards in 1994 for "And if Venice Is Sinking".

He was nominated for the Genie Award for Best Cinematography for I've Heard the Mermaids Singing (1987) and Last Night (1998), as well as for the Canadian Society of Cinematographers Award for Best Cinematography in a Theatrical Feature for Last Night. In 2015, he won the Canadian Screen Award for Best Photography in a Comedy Program or Series for HBO Canada and Bell Media's episode "The Three Sisters" in the TV series Sensitive Skin. He was nominated for the Canadian Society of Cinematographers Award for Theatrical Feature Cinematography for the 2018 Through Black Spruce.

== Filmography ==
=== Film ===
Documentary film

Year	Title	Director	Notes
1984	Snowscreen	Robert Shoub	With Robert Shoub
1987	The Sexiest Animal	Stephen Withrow	With Rhett Morita
1991	The Falls	Kevin McMahon	

Feature film

Year	Title	Director	Notes
1987	I've Heard the Mermaids Singing	Patricia Rozema	
1987	Night Friend	Peter Gerretsen	
1988	Martha, Ruth & Edie	Deepa Mehta; Norma Bailey; Danièle J. Suissa	
1988	Dear John	Catherine Lord	
1988	Turnabout	Don Owen	With John Herzog
1989	Friends, Lovers, & Lunatics	Stephen Withrow	
1990	Defy Gravity	Michael Gibson	
1995	When Night Is Falling	Patricia Rozema	
1998	Last Night	Don McKellar	
2002	Bollywood/Hollywood	Deepa Mehta	
2003	The Republic of Love	Deepa Mehta	
2013	The Grand Seduction	Don McKellar	
2018	Through Black Spruce	Don McKellar	
2020	Funny Boy	Deepa Mehta	
2022	Crimes of the Future	David Cronenberg	
2024	Humane	Caitlin Cronenberg	
2024	The Shrouds	David Cronenberg	

Short film

Year	Title	Director	Notes
1991	Battle of the Bulge	Arlene Hazzan Green	
1993	Collateral Damage	Leonard Farlinger	
1999	Rusty	Jeremy Hindle	
2000	A Word from the Management	Don McKellar	Segment of Preludes
2008	The Catsitter	Tim Hamilton	
2015	It's Not You	Don McKellar	
2023	Moments Away	Stephanie Morgenstern	
2023	Alone	Charles Uwagbai	
2023	Meta Mom	Simone Stock	
2023	Black Paris	Sid Zanforlin	
2025	Pick One	Julian De Zotti	

=== Television ===
TV movies

Year	Title	Director
1987	The Kidnapping of Baby John Doe	Peter Gerretsen
2002	Untitled Secret Service Project	Rupert Wainwright
2004	Meltdown	Jeremiah S. Chechik
2017	Perverts Anonymous: Episodes 1-3	Tim Hamilton
2017	Perverts Anonymous: Episode 1, Disguises	Tim Hamilton

TV series

Year	Title	Director	Notes
2007	Not This But This	Mark Mainguy	
2007	The Bronx Is Burning	Jeremiah S. Chechik	Miniseries
2008	The Middleman	Jeremiah S. Chechik	Episode "The Pilot Episode Sanction"
2011–2017	Michael: Every Day	Don McKellar; Alison Maclean; Patricia Rozema	All 18 episodes
2013	Bodyslam	Robert Budreau	TV special
2014–2016	Sensitive Skin	Don McKellar	All 12 episodes
2015	The Second City Project	Tim Hamilton	
2022	Children Ruin Everything	Renuka Jeyapalan; Melanie Orr	Season 1
