= Amanda Boyden =

American novelist

Amanda Boyden is an American novelist.

Born in Northern Minnesota and raised in Chicago and St. Louis, Boyden studied creative writing at the University of New Orleans, where she and her ex-husband, Canadian writer Joseph Boyden, were faculty members until 2012. In addition to writing, Amanda Boyden is a trapeze artist who founded Aerialists, Inc., her own all-female troupe, and performed as Lady Hummingbird. Her memoir, I Got the Dog (2020), details personal aspects of her marriage and divorce, while "offering little in the way of schadenfreude."

== Works ==
- Pretty Little Dirty (2006)
- Babylon Rolling (2008)
- I Got the Dog (2020)
