= The Orenda =

2013 novel by Joseph Boyden

- First edition
- Author: Joseph Boyden
- Genre: Canadian literature, First Nations
- Publisher: Hamish Hamilton
- Publication date: September 10, 2013
- Publication place: Canada
- Media type: Print (Hardback)
- Pages: 490 (Hamish Hamilton) (Penguin Group) hardcover edition
- ISBN: 978-0-670-06418-2 (Penguin Group Canada)
- Preceded by: Through Black Spruce

The Orenda is a historical novel by Canadian author Joseph Boyden. It was published by Hamish Hamilton in 2013.

== Summary ==
The novel takes place in what was to become Canada in the early 17th century and is narrated by a Wendat (Huron) warrior named Bird, a young Haudenosaunee girl named Snow Falls, and a French Jesuit missionary named Christophe.

=== Part one ===
Bird's family has been murdered by members of the Haudenosaunee tribe. In retaliation he vows to kill at least a hundred members of that tribe per victim. During one of his retaliatory attacks he captures Snow Falls, whom he decides to raise as his own daughter. Snow Falls cannot shake the knowledge that he murdered her family and rejects him as an adoptive father. Christophe is another captive that Bird calls Crow, keeping him in the belief that he will be of use in future trades with other colonialists. Christophe feels that the Wendat who captured him are savage and godless and tries to convert them to Christianity. While Christophe's initial efforts are mocked because of his physical frailty and poor understanding of their language, Bird begins to grow suspicious when his lover, Gosling, warns Bird that Christophe will soon begin converting members of the tribe.

At Gosling's suggestion, Bird makes a plan to allow Christophe to be murdered by the Haudenosaunee when he and a band of warriors go to visit the French colonists to participate in trade that summer. On the journey Snow Falls decides to make it so Bird can never forget her; she does this by cutting off his pinky finger in the night and mistakenly her own as well. Bird has the opportunity to do away with Christophe when members of Snow Falls' village attack members of his, promising that worse is to come if he fails to return the girl and a meeting is set for him to return her to them. However, because of an accident of Christophe's, the arranged meeting to return Snow Falls does not go as planned. Bird and his companions murder the party and when an opportunity to allow Christophe to die presents itself, Bird finds himself saving his life.

Bird's party makes their way to New France where they are greeted by Champlain. Bird asks for his help in defeating their mutual Haudenosaunee enemies. Champlain agrees, and gives Bird one gun, asking in return that Bird, and the members of his village, listen to Christophe and accept more priests into their community.

Meanwhile, Snow Falls is attacked by a French guard, saved from being raped by Christophe. As a punishment, the man who assaulted her is whipped and Bird and his men, taking this as a sign of loyalty, take two more priests on the return voyage to their village. The section ends with the Haudenosaunee attacking the travelling party who are saved by Bird's new gun.

=== Part two ===
The second part of the novel begins three years after the end of the last section. Bird's village has been decimated by a plague. The only thing saving their village from being attacked by their enemies is that they too have been infected. It is now a race to see who can recover the quickest.

In the time that has passed Snow Falls has slowly grown accustomed to life in the village. Knowing that soon she will begin menstruating, the women take her in to teach her their customs. She becomes especially close to Gosling, who promises to teach her magic. Snow Falls also develops a crush on a boy around her age, Carries an Axe, but he shows no interest in her. The boy does give Snow Falls a raven he shot as a present, which she and the women of the village preserve.

Meanwhile, Christophe has slowly been collecting a greater audience for his preaching, including an older women he names Delilah and a young boy he names Aaron. The little audience he gains is quickly taken away when Bird and members of a neighbouring village depart for the summer on a trading mission. When a drought nearly destroys the village's three sisters tensions between the villagers and Christophe and his fellow priests quickly escalate. He decides to throw a ten-day mass to pray for rain, and to his surprise he is successful and a few of the villagers return to evening prayers. However, after Gosling cures a sick woman in front of the entire village, the people turn on Christophe and his fellow priests once more. In a desperate move he throws a feast for the entire village, but that too is unsuccessful.

Bird returns from his trading village with three prisoners. The two older men are tortured to death, but Snow Falls begs Bird to adopt the youngest boy into their family and he agrees. The boy becomes strange after watching his clans men tortured. Bird also brings with him news from the governor of New France who informs Christophe and his fellow priests they are to have enough supplies and fellow priests to form a new village. Bird ends up sending his new adoptive son to live with the priests and they also gain a handful of converts from neighbouring villages.

The new arrivals seem to bring with them a plague even worse than the one from three years before. One to two thirds of the members of his village die, Bird sends Snow Falls along with Carries an Axe travel to the colonist's village to protect her. After the plague has passed, on his way to retrieve her, he hears that a huge neighbouring village of allies has been destroyed by the Haudenosaunee who are on their way to attack his own village. He is also informed that Christophe, Aaron, Snow Falls, her new brother, and Carries an Axe were last seen on their way to the now destroyed village in an attempt to gather converts.

=== Part three ===
The final section of the novel begins with Snow Falls, Gosling and Carries an Axe arriving at the colonists' village. Despite Bird believing it will be a refuge, it is just as diseased and miserable as the other infected villages. Snow Falls desires to leave but Christophe asks that she watch him preach in a neighbouring village before leaving. There she sees her former tribe, the Haudenosaunee, torturing members of the village from afar and realizes she no longer belongs to them. Meanwhile, her brother leaves them to rejoin his tribe after telling Christophe that his men have been raping him. She and her party are overtaken by Haudenosaunee who try to rape her and kill the rest of the men but they are saved by herself and Carries an Axe.

Bird and Snow Falls leave, but later return to ask for guns and more protection from their French allies. Christophe is unable to give them more aid and is struggling to lead his village after discovering that members of his order may have been raping young converts and are drinking alcohol against his orders. Meanwhile, on this visit, Snow Falls is raped by Aaron who has become addicted to alcohol and shortly after becomes pregnant. She decides to marry Carries an Axe and raise the child as their own despite being unsure who the father of her child is. Shortly thereafter Gosling reveals she is pregnant as well.

After discovering that their corn crop has been infected, leaving them with minimal supplies for winter, Bird, and the rest of his village are forced to go to the colonists' village where supplies are more plentiful.

Soon after arriving, Aaron goes missing and is discovered to have hanged himself. The following winter Snow Falls gives birth to a daughter and news comes that Bird's village has been attacked leaving only 30 or so survivors. The Haudenosaunee attack the colonists' village a few days later. After a three-day battle the Haudenosaunee are successful in taking over the village. Carries an Axe and his father are killed in the battle. Snow Falls and Delilah are poisoned by a Jesuit who has already been through the torture of the Haudenosaunee and believes that death is preferable. Her child, her mother-in-law, and her mother-in-law's baby are all adopted into the Haudenosaunee tribe.

Christophe is tortured to death. Bird, Gosling and a handful of his village are able to escape and survive on an island in the 'Sweet Water Sea' where Bird buries Snow Falls. Gosling gives birth to twins, a boy and a girl, and tells him that the next summer they will live with her people, the Anishnaabe.

== Reception ==
The National Post called it "a timeless [novel]; born a classic". Quill & Quire dubbed it a "magnificent literary beast". The novel has been criticized for its depictions of the Wendat, Haudenosaunee and orenda. It has been described as a "comforting narrative to Canadians" and argued that the "Haudenosaunee are not represented well at all."

== Awards and nominations ==
The novel was a shortlisted nominee for the 2013 Governor General's Award for English fiction. The novel was also longlisted for the 2013 Scotiabank Giller Prize, but failed to make the shortlist.

The novel was selected for the 2014 edition of Canada Reads, where it was championed by journalist (and future Manitoba premier) Wab Kinew. On March 6, 2014, the novel won the competition.
