= Alor (company) =

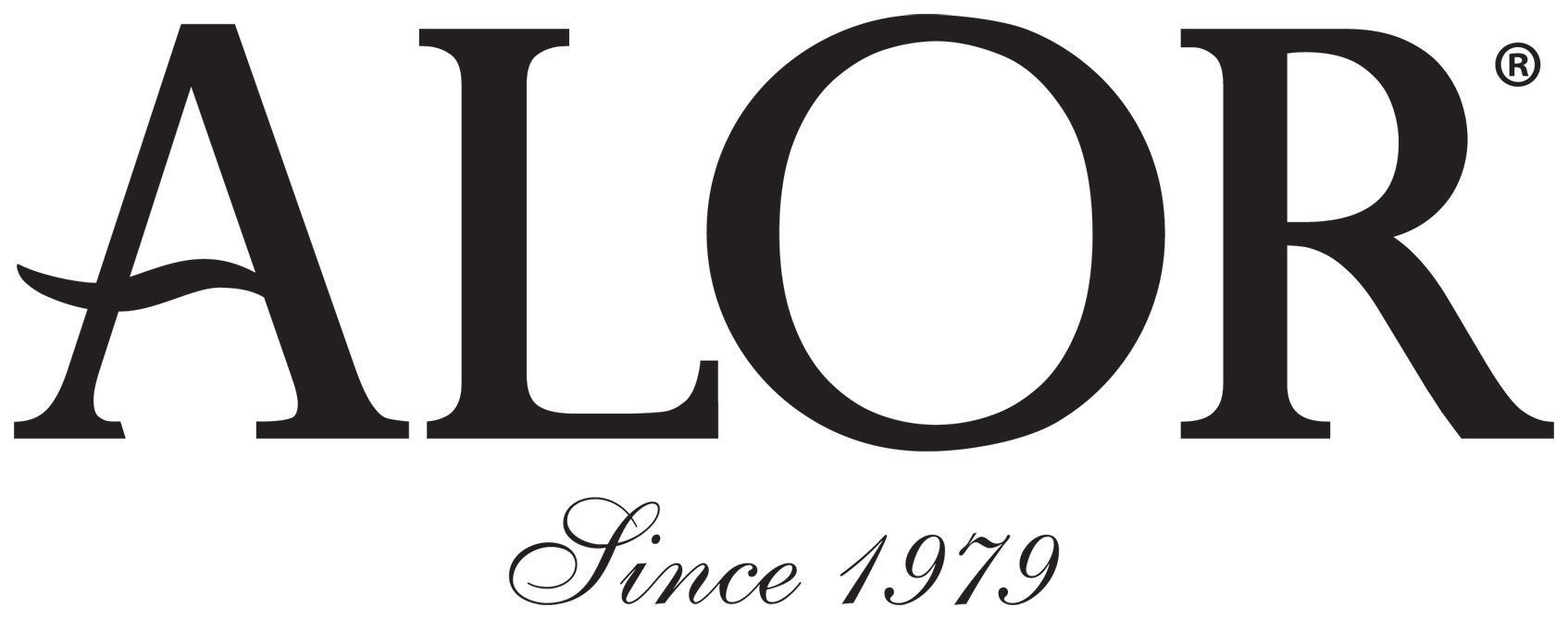
- Company type: Private
- Industry: Jewelry, Watch
- Founded: 1979
- Founders: Jack Zemer; Sandy Zemer
- Headquarters: San Diego, California
- Key people: Jack Zemer (Founder & Chairman); Sandy Zemer (Founder & President)
- Products: Luxury jewelry, watch and lifestyle
- Website: www.alor.com

Alor is an American luxury jewelry brand, largely utilizing stainless steel cable in their items to create jewelry pieces and accessories. It is headquartered in San Diego, California.

== History ==
Alor was founded in 1979 in California by Jack and Sandy Zemer. Jack was a former nuclear engineer at General Electric. The company's name "Alor" was derived from the names of Jack and Sandy's sons, Tal and Ori, who are currently the Principals and Presidents of the company. Alor first publicly displayed its nautical cable motif jewelry in the early 1980s.

From 1970 to 1992, Alor sold stainless steel cable, along with 18-karat gold and diamond jewelry under the "Alor" name.

In 1992, Alor began a partnership with Phillipe Charriol International and formed Charriol USA. While ALOR International Ltd. remained the parent company, all Alor jewelry designs were sold under the name Charriol USA throughout the U.S. and the Caribbean. The partnership ended in early 2014, with ALOR International Ltd. reverting to its original brand name Alor. They carried out a national advertising campaign as a rebranding strategy, which featured model Noot Seear photographed by Justin Coit.

As of February 2024, Alor currently sells to retailers in Australia, the Caribbean, China, Hong Kong, and Mexico.

In 2013, Ori and Tal Zemer launched Alor Swiss Watches, featuring details such as stainless steel cable bands and 18-karat gold and diamond embellishments.

In 2015, Alor released its Black Label jewelry collection. The Black Label pieces are made of 18-karat gold, featuring overlapping circles and ovals set with rubies, and black, colorless, and canary diamonds.

In 2017, ALOR partnered with EMA Jewelry to launch a bridal collection called Down the Aisle. EMA handles distribution and sales as Alor’s global licensee. In addition to Down The Aisle, ALOR will partner with Diamond Foundry to bring a fully lab-grown designer collection of bridal rings to the marketplace, called ALOR EcoEarth. ALOR and EMA have also teamed with the non-profit organization, 1% For the Planet to donate a portion of all proceeds back to preserving the precious resources of our planet.

== Partnership with Empowerment ==
From November 2013 through 2014, Alor was the exclusive watch and jewelry sponsor for the women’s leadership and revitalization overnight camp, Campowerment. As sponsors, Alor gave the "camper of the day" a watch from their Swiss watch collection. Alor also provided relaxation lounges at all camp sessions, as well as scholarships to attend other Empowerment retreats.

== Advertising campaign ==
In 2015, Alor unveiled a new advertising campaign. In a departure from past campaigns featuring models or other high-profile faces, its cable jewelry was the sole focus in new ads.
