= The Tofus =

Animated television series

- From left to right: Mom, Lola, and Chichi, with Curly the sheep in the background.
- Genre: Animated series; Comedy
- Created by: Fabrice de Costil; Bertrand Victor
- Developed by: Sandrine Laprévotte
- Directed by: Bruno Bianchi
- Voices of: Maria Bircher; Marcel Jeannin; Brigid Tierney; Aaron Grunfeld; Sonja Ball; Cary Lawrence; Daniel Brochu; Jesse Vinet; Kayla Grunfeld; Harry Standjofski; Jason Szwimer; Sarah Allen; Pauline Little; Michael Yarmush
- Composers: Alain Garcia; Noam Kaniel; Michael Tavera
- Countries of origin: France; Canada
- Original language: English
- No. of seasons: 2
- No. of episodes: 26 (52 segments) (list of episodes)

Production
- Executive producers: Olivier Dumont; Jacques Pettigrew; Jacqueline Tordjman; Michel Lemire
- Producers: Bruno Bianchi; Danielle Marleau
- Running time: 22 minutes (11 minutes per segment)
- Production companies: SIP Animation; CinéGroupe

Original release
- Network: Jetix (international); France 3 (France); Teletoon (Canada)
- Release: September 6, 2004 – February 13, 2005

The Tofus (French: Les Tofou) is an animated sitcom produced by SIP Animation and CinéGroupe. It is a satirical parody of the environmentalist lifestyle epitomized by its title family, which consists of Mom, Pop, Chichi, Lola, and Buba. The show is set in the fictional town of Beauvillage, and lampoons many aspects of the environmental movement, including environmental organizations, animal rights, and pacifism.

Since its debut on September 6, 2004 on Teletoon in Canada, the program aired twenty-six episodes consisting of fifty-two segments over two seasons.

== Premise ==
Environmental activists Mom and Pop Tofu, concerned that their family is suffocating from urban routine, decide to move to a farmhouse in the town of Beauvillage and embrace a more natural way of life, much to the horror of their pre-teen children, Chichi and Lola. They would rather watch TV and go shopping than amuse themselves with Grandma Buba's animals: Cracker the Rooster, Curly the Sheep, and Suzie the Goat. The siblings must cope with their parents' ecology-friendly world vision and the humiliation that results from their efforts to encourage others to protect the environment.

The neighbourhood that the family settles in is filled with electronically able individuals, contrasting the Tofus' all-organic lifestyle. Unlike her mechanical-genius brother Chichi–who believes in peace within the family–Lola is more cynical and averse to being deemed oddballs in their new home. She occupies herself with her attraction to Billy Hubbub, the boy next door, despite his parents objections.

== Characters ==
Chichi (Aaron Grunfeld)

Meek but smart. Has a crush on a local teen named Candy. Good friends with Candy and Phil.

Lola (Brigid Tierney)

Loyal to her brother, best friends with Lily. Has a crush on her neighbour, Billy Hubbub.

Mom (Maria Bircher)

She's a zen mother trying to keep her house in line.

Pop (Marcel Jeannin)

He's considered oblivious a lot of the time which ends up proving false since he's usually fairly early in discovering what's going on in his house. He is also something of a handy-man, as he is often seen inventing machines made of environmentally friendly material, or otherwise run on clean fuel.

Buba (Sonja Ball)

Lola and Chichi's grandmother. She's the one who grew up in the farm land and it's the life she knows.

April (Jesse Vinet)

She is a girl who often hangs around the Tofu household. Since her parents work in the emergency ward, she is often left lonely and so grew attached to the more attentive and sincere Tofus. She also developed a quick attraction to Chichi, giving him pet names like 'Chichi honey-bun'.

William "Billy" Hubbub (Daniel Brochu)

Son of Titus and Beth Hubbub, he's Lola's next door neighbour and biggest all-time crush. The only real thing keeping him from pursuing her is disrupting the families, who will often determine that they don't want the polluter's and the biodegraded's kids together.

Titus Hubbub (Harry Standjofski)

Master of Alarms, Titus is Billy's father and number one hater of the Tofu family. He is also their next-door neighbour.

Elizabeth "Beth" Hubbub (Pauline Little)

She runs the restaurant Burger Palace and this tends to cause a lot of conflict between the families since the Tofus don't like that she uses artificial ingredients.

Phillip "Phil" (Jason Szwimer)

The neighbour on the other side of the Tofu household. He is Chichi's best friend and confidant.

Lillian "Lily" (Kayla Grunfeld)

Lola's best friend and confidant. She is a bit quirky, being a hopeless romantic and a boatload of advice.

Cherie (Sarah Allen)

Lola's rival and the queen bee of her school.

Nicolas "Nick"

Chichi's rival. The leader of the team of the bullies at Beauvillage.

Susan "Suzie", Cottontail "Curly", Cracker

Buba's farm animals. Suzie is a goat. Suzie likes to eat everything and accidentally destroys it. Curly is a sheep with a lot of hair. Cracker is a rooster.

Beatrice (Cary Lawrence)

Kris (Michael Yarmush)

== Episodes ==
=== Season 1 (2004) ===
No. overall	No. in season	Title	Written by	Storyboard by
1a	1a	"That Fashion Itch"	Fabrice de Costil, Bertrand Victor	Patrick Claeys
Lola is forced to wear a dress knitted by Buba to school, just as she tries to get invited to rock concert with Billy. Meanwhile, after he and Phil accidentally destroyed the star's guitar, Chichi decides to use Pop's guitar to help.
1b	1b	"Eureka!"	Claire Paoletti	Jean-Charles André
Chichi works with Pop on an original invention for a physics test. Meanwhile, April tries to get a lot of hairstyles to force Chichi to say she looks cute.
2a	2a	"Hey, Who Turned Out the Lights?"	Jean-Rémi François	Thierry Martin
Kids at school become hooked on playing a video-game called Blast-Masters. Chichi tries to play it, but the power keeps going out from a lack of wind.
2b	2b	"Getting the Hang of Yang"	Claire Paoletti	Jean-Charles André
Lola competes with rival Cherie for a leading part in the annual school play. Mom and Bea decide to help Lola with Feng Shui.
3a	3a	"Strictly for the Birds"	Marc Larmigny	Philippe Amador
Chichi is accused of stealing a CD player from a store. Lola, Phil and Lily try to prove that the real thief is Chris and Chichi is innocent. Meanwhile, Pop calls a lot of birds to fly with them, Chichi and Lola around the sky.
3b	3b	"Rooster Crime Watch"	Sophie Decroisette, Jean-Rémi François	Isabelle Rifaux
Titus Hubbub prohibits the Tofus from coming to his upcoming garden party after being attacked by Cracker. Lola sneaks to the party to reveal her love to Billy.
4a	4a	"Tough Guys Can Cry"	Fabrice de Costil & Bertrand Victor	Thierry Martin
Chichi and class bully Nick enter into a feud while Buba prepares Curly for a contest.
4b	4b	"Lovesick"	Jean-Rémi François	Angel Marcano
Billy's family leaves Beauvillage, traumatizing Lola. Mom, Pop, Lily and Bea try to help.
5a	5a	"The Tofu Zoo"	Catherine Cuenca	Isabelle Rifaux
Lola and Lily get into a fight with one another. Meanwhile, the Tofus cure a lot of the animals.
5b	5b	"Running Away at Christmas Time"	Marine Locatelli, Héloïse Cappocia	Jean-Charles André
Lola runs away from home on account of her parents' inability to have an ordinary Christmas.
6a	6a	"Prime Time Panic"	Pascal Mirleau & Tony Scott	Angel Marcano
The Tofus are invited to appear on a TV show that ridicules their environmentalist lifestyle. Chichi and Lola try to stop this or the whole public will find out all about the Tofus.
6b	6b	"Crying Over Spilled Milk"	Isabelle Dubernet & Eric Fuhrer	Philippe Amador
Chichi sells goat's milk to students wanting good grades on their tests. Meanwhile, after an accident, Lola has a milk on her hair and lies to her friends this is Buba's shampoo.
7a	7a	"This'll Make a Man Out of You, Son!"	Claire Paoletti	Céline Balandreau
Chichi goes on a survival mission in the forest to "become a man" because he got a crush on Candy.
7b	7b	"Kidnapping"	Marc Larmigny	Isabelle Rifaux
Accused, the Tofus investigate the theft of Titus Hubbub's garden gnomes.
8a	8a	"Just Call Me April Tofu"	Karine Mazloumian	Philippe Amador
April "breaks up" with her parents to get adopted by the Tofus.
8b	8b	"The Greening of Burger Palace"	Nathalie Reznikoff, Séverine Vuillaume	Bruno Issaly
The Burger Palace fast-food restaurant is approached by demonstrators, who turn it into the site of a sit-in. Secretly, Chichi and Lola went to the restaurant to eat, but, however, Curly shows up there too and they try to hide her and themselves from demonstrators.
9a	9a	"A Star is Almost Born"	Jérôme Richebon, Justine Cheynet	Philippe Amador
To be popular at school, Chichi starts a radio station.
9b	9b	"Extreme Bio-Babble"	Marc Larmigny	Jean-Charles André
An environmental guru named Master Biozen stays at the Tofu residence. Chichi and Lola want to banish Master Biozen because they have their own things for Phil and Lily. It turns out that Master Biozen isn't the person he claims to be.
10a	10a	"Urban Jungle"	Marine Locatelli, Héloïse Cappocia	Bruno Issaly
Mom and Pop consider moving back to the city. Chichi and Lola take Suzie and Curly along to disrupt the move because their friends are important.
10b	10b	"The Visit of the Great Oneness"	Nathalie Reznikoff & Séverine Vuillaume	Christophe Hutwhol
Chichi claims to have met an alien known as the "Great Oneness".
11a	11a	"The Wrong Rite of Spring"	Claude Gras, Jean-Rémy François	Cécile Lavocat
Lola throws a party while her parents are out of the house.
11b	11b	"Downhill Competition"	Justine Cheynet, Claire Paoletti	Bruno Issaly
A school ski trip is interrupted by the Tofu parents' demonstration against deforestation made by Hubbubs' to build Burger Palace. Lola tries to get Billy away from it to let him teach her skiing.
12a	12a	"Locked In"	Hadrien Soulez Larivière	Isabelle Rifaux
Lola, Billy and Suzie are locked in the Hubbubs' house due to an alarm malfunction. While being trapped, Lola and Billy accidentally kiss.
12b	12b	"A Whale of a Valentine's Day"	Justine Cheynet	Thierry Martin
Lola seeks to reunite Lily and her true love, Christian.
13a	13a	"That's What I Call Hubbub!"	Jérome Richebon, Florence Sandis	Angel Marcano
Titus Hubbub petitions for the Tofu family's removal from the neighbourhood. Chichi and Lola try to disrupt it being pretending under their houses is an underground secret passage way with the treasures.
13b	13b	"Microchip vs. Macrosheep"	Karine Mazloumian	Christophe Hutwhol
Lola works on a school project with Buba's twin sister, Ramona.

=== Season 2 (2005) ===
No. overall	No. in season	Title	Written by	Storyboard by
14a	1a	"The Beast of Beauvillage"	Karine Mazloumian	Philippe Amador
A dangerous wolf is on the prowl in the hills outside Beauvillage, frightening residents. Chichi wants to prove that wolf is the Beast of Beauvillage.
14b	1b	"Chichi the Speedster"	Isabelle Dubernet & Eric Furher	Jean-Charles André
Chichi enters a mini-car race, but is pressured by his parents into building an ecologically-sound vehicle. Meanwhile, Lola isn't interested in races, but becomes interested when Billy asks her to ride with him as a team in a race.
15a	2a	"Tomato Blackmail"	Fabrice de Costil, Bertrand Victor	Philippe Amador
Buba produces a new delicious breed of organic tomato. Cherie and Chris plan to trick Lola into cheating in math test to get Buba's tomatoes to deli.
15b	2b	"Hubbubmobile"	Sebastien Dejardin	Philippe Amador
Lola hides in the Hubbubs' new camping car to go on a picnic with Billy, but the car is hijacked. The hijackers are revealed to be Mom and Pop.
16a	3a	"School Dinner Blues"	Claude Scasso	Christophe Hutwhol
Mom replaces the Head Cook in the school cafeteria. Lola is upset for that because she's at the school advice. Most of the school kids are angry because they have to eat organic food.
16b	3b	"Buba's Ark"	Karine Mazloumian	Isabelle Rifaux
A rain storm forces the Hubbubs to lodge with the Tofus. Meanwhile, Chichi collects a lot of frogs.
17a	4a	"Secret Agent Tofu X-08"	François Déon & Bertrand Veyne	Christophe Villez
Chichi and Phil become secret agents. They try to defeat Titus Hubbub's new security robot.
17b	4b	"The Pebble of Mount Uluru"	Nathalie Reznikoff, Séverine Vuillaume	Angel Marcano
Mom discovers a stone said to have healing powers. Meanwhile, April continues to get closer to Chichi.
18a	5a	"Sacked!"	Jean-Rémi François	Philippe Amador
Pop is fired from his job for a mistake made by Chichi.
18b	5b	"Chichi's Big Splash!"	Stéphane Piera	Celine Balandreau
Chichi wins a contest at Beauvillage Aqua-Park. However, Mom, Pop and Buba try to disrupt it because the Aqua-Park is toxic. Chichi, Lola, Billy and Phil sneak there to prove there aren't any toxic until they find out there's a lot of toxic underwater.
19a	6a	"Fried Gift Inside!"	Jérôme Richebon, Florence Sandis	Bruno Issaly
Lola gets a job working at the Burger Palace to pay for her mother's birthday gift. However, Pop spots her there and this makes Mom very upset. Lola tries to do something.
19b	6b	"Cash and Trash"	Karine Mazloumian	Isabelle Rifaux
Pop and Mom volunteer as trash collectors while Beauvillage's regulars are on strike. Meanwhile, Lola tries to give Billy back his compass, but fails and soon the compass has disappeared.
20a	7a	"The Great Escape!"	Isabelle Dubernet, Eric Fuhrer	Jean-Charles André
The Tofus rescue circus animals they believe are being held illegally. Meanwhile, Chichi becomes obsessed with Jackie Chan's martial arts.
20b	7b	"Lemon Confidential"	Catherine Cuenca	Jean-Charles André
Mom prints an ecology newsletter on Lola's diary pages, which were written with invisible ink. Lola tries to get the diary pages from neighbourhood or Billy will find out she got a crush on another guy.
21a	8a	"The Revenge of the Pumpkins"	Nathalie Reznikoff, Séverine Vuillaume	Philippe Amador
Billy holds a Halloween party. Chichi and Lola try to get there, but are interrupted by a pumpkin ghost, who's in reality Titus Hubbub who's stuck in a pumpkin.
21b	8b	"All Tyred Out"	Catherine Cuenca	Jean-Charles André
The Tofu parents embark on a rubber-recycling project.
22a	9a	"When Worms Attack"	Luc Larivière	Angel Marcano
Phil's rare worms are unleashed upon the town during a gardening competition.
22b	9b	"Cauliflower is Wasted on the Young"	Stéphane Piera	Bruno Issaly
Chichi and Lola play a prank on the neighbours by convincing them that their grandmother's great-niece Gertrude is a younger version of Buba after having eaten cauliflower from the Tofus' garden.
23a	10a	"Zen Blowpipe"	Nathalie Reznikoff, Séverine Vuillaume	Isabelle Rifaux
Chichi gets into trouble for supposedly cheating in class. Mom learns Zen Blowpipe and the teacher, Mrs. Clara, appears, who's in reality the school curator to check how the Tofus raise Chichi and Lola.
23b	10b	"Lights, Camera, Goats"	Sandrine Laprévotte, Jérôme Richebon	Isabelle Rifaux
Upon learning that the goat is considered sacred to some cultures, the Tofus begin treating Suzie like a goddess. Chichi hires Suzie to be a star of the movie.
24a	11a	"Just Who Are You, Pop?"	Florence Sandis	Bruno Issaly
Pop suffers amnesia after a blow to the head. Meanwhile, Lola searches for the key of the barn where she hidden Billy's birthday cake.
24b	11b	"Operation Biorhythm"	Nathalie Reznikoff, Séverine Vuillaume	Bruno Issaly
The Tofu parents urge their children to respect other peoples' biorhythms. Chichi takes the biorhythm calculator to respect the school kids' biorhythms, but Mrs. Starchy doesn't want it.
25a	12a	"Out, Out, Fake Spot!"	Isabelle Dubernet, Eric Fuhrer	Jean-Charles André
Chichi fakes illness to avoid taking a math test. The math test is taken to another day because the school goes for a whole day to Splash Land. Chichi tries to leave, but is interrupted by his parents to give him a very long therapy.
25b	12b	"The Treasure of the Beauvillage River"	Catherine Cuenca	Jean-Charles André
Chichi and Phil go on a treasure hunt. Meanwhile, a new form of algae has been proliferating there, thus depriving the eels in the river of oxygen.
26a	13a	"Megacity Kids Go Tofu"	Justine Cheynet, Stéphane Piera	Philippe Amador
Students from a large city, Megacity, lodge with Beauvillage residents for a student exchange program.
26b	13b	"A Hair-Raising Model Shoot"	Stéphane Piera	Isabelle Rifaux
Chichi and Lola trick their mother into allowing Lola to appear in an egg shampoo commercial.

== Production ==
The Tofus was co-produced by SIP Animation and CinéGroupe. It was directed by Bruno Bianchi, and produced by Bianchi and Danielle Marleau with the assistance of several other executive producers out of Maple Pictures Corp., and scripted by twenty-six writers, including series creators Fabrice de Costil and Bertrand Victor. All the scripts were story edited by Florence Sandis in charge of the script directing. Original music was composed by Alain Garcia and Noam Kaniel.

Each episode of The Tofus was budgeted at US$230,000, and each thirty-minute time block was divided into two fifteen minute-long episodes.

The first episode of France 3's French-language version of The Tofus premiered on January 3, 2005. As Fox Kids Europe was renamed Jetix Europe in July 2004, the program was broadcast under the new brand Jetix when it arrived in other European countries in 2006.

There were five main cast members who voiced The Tofus. Aaron Grunfeld performed the voice of Chichi, while Brigid Tierney performed the voice of Lola. Maria Bircher played Mum, Marcel Jeannin voiced Pop, and Sonja Ball took the role of Buba. Voice direction was overseen by Terrence Scammell.

== Development ==
The show's development was first revealed in April 2002 under the name of Tofu Family, when Saban International Paris (before their renaming to SIP Animation in October) announced that they had pre-sold the series to ITV in the United Kingdom to air on their CITV programming strand, while France 3 was attached as well. The show was originally put into production solely at SIP.

By March 2003, the production for the series was started, and it was confirmed that Teletoon and Fox Kids Europe had joined in the production for the series as well. By June 2003, SIP announced that CinéGroupe in Canada would co-produce the series and that Fox Kids Europe's broadcast deal also included merchandise rights and a first broadcast window on their Fox Kids channels worldwide except in the UK and France, due to the existing deals with ITV and France 3 respectively.

The rights to the series were shared between CinéGroupe, SIP and FKE. CinéGroupe handled Canada, SIP Animation handled France and other French-speaking territories, while Fox Kids Europe handled the rest of the world. Distribution services were handled by Buena Vista International Television except for Canada.

== Reception ==
The Tofus was generally well-received by viewers. It has been called "a modern gloss on the classic family sitcom [that] aptly skewers the granola-munching righteousness of the eco-hippie archetype," and has been commended for its use of ecology as a unique background theme. The Tofus also received top audience ratings among the France 3 Youth Programs in 2005.

Alex Kucharski of the Toronto Star gave the film a negative review, writing, "From the theme song to the plot to the graphics to the end credits this show is just ghastly! Even though the plot is very original, this show is definitely not funny." The Gazette's Kathryn Freenaway said the series has "negative storylines".

== See also ==
- The Goode Family
- The Modern Parents
- What's with Andy?
