= Three Day Road =

Novel by Joseph Boyden

- First edition
- Author: Joseph Boyden
- Genre: Historical Fiction, Canadian Literature, World War I, First Nations
- Publisher: Viking Canada
- Publication date: March 17, 2005
- Publication place: Canada
- Media type: Print (Hardback & Paperback)
- Pages: 400 p. (Penguin Group Canada trade paperback edition)
- ISBN: 0143017861 (Penguin Group Canada)
- Followed by: Through Black Spruce

Three Day Road is the first novel from Canadian writer Joseph Boyden. Joseph's maternal grandfather, as well as an uncle on his father's side, served as soldiers during the First World War, and Boyden draws upon a wealth of family narratives. This novel follows the journey of two young Cree men, Xavier and Elijah, who volunteer for that war and become snipers during the conflict. The book was generally critically well received.

== Plot ==
Set in 1919, following the end of World War I, the novel takes place in the wilderness of Northern Ontario and on the battlefields of France and Belgium. Niska, an Oji-Cree medicine woman, is the remnant of her native relatives who refused to assimilate in the 19th century. She rejected European beliefs and culture and continues to thrive in the bush in a manner befitting her and her traditions. Niska's voice is one of two narratives that complete the novel. After getting word that her closest thing to living family, Elijah, is coming back from the war, she paddles the three-day journey to meet him in town. She finds, however, that it is not Elijah but her nephew Xavier who has returned from battle. In an attempt to heal her only relative, who has clearly been sucked dry of his soul and has hardened with nightmares from the war and turned hollow by morphine, she begins to recount the stories of her past. She believes that perhaps this will revive Xavier and the Three Day Road will not be one to his demise. Similarly, Xavier attempts to stumble over his story for his aunt and unearths ghosts of his bullet-riddled past.

The novel was inspired in part by real-life Indigenous World War I heroes Francis Pegahmagabow and John Shiwak. In addition it seems relevant that Boyden's father Raymond Wilfrid Boyden was a medical officer renowned for his bravery, who was awarded the Distinguished Service Order and was the most highly decorated medical officer of World War II.[1]

== The significance of the title ==
As Xavier, one of the protagonists reflects in the novel, the number three is especially relevant not only to Indigenous cultures but Europeans alike. It would appear to Xavier that the number three can be found everywhere. There is the front line, the support line, and the reserve line, for example. There is the infantry, the cavalry, and the artillery. In moments off battle, there is food, then rest, then women. In church, the Father, Son, and Holy Ghost. There is even superstition about lighting three cigarettes with one match. Xavier remembers specifically though, about what his aunt Niska told him about those ready for death having to walk the Three Day Road. In the novel, we accompany Xavier on what would seem to be his Three Day Road; his journey back to his home with Niska and her stories trying to heal him.

== Themes ==
Among other ideas the book explores the cultural gulf between European settlers in Canada and the Indigenous peoples.

== Awards and recognition ==
- Nominee for the 2005 Governor General's Awards.
- Winner of the McNally Robinson Aboriginal Book of the Year Award.
- Winner of the Rogers Writers' Trust Fiction Prize for 2005.
- Selected for inclusion in Canada Reads 2006, where it was championed by filmmaker Nelofer Pazira.
- Winner, 2006 Amazon/Books in Canada First Novel Award
