= Jason Szwimer =

Canadian voice actor (born 1991)

- Born: December 20, 1991 (age 34); Montreal, Quebec, Canada
- Occupation: Voice actor
- Years active: 1997–present

Jason Szwimer (born December 20, 1991) sometimes mistakenly credited and known as Jason Szwimmer, is a Canadian voice actor. He was the voice of Dora Winifred Read on Arthur. He provided the voice of Elf in the Télétoon TV series Caillou's Holiday Movie and voiced Phil in the Teletoon TV series The Tofus.

He has developed a podcast, titled Finding D.W., wherein he looks for all of the actors who have voiced the character of D.W. Read.

== Filmography ==
- Arthur, It's Only Rock and Roll – Dora Winifred "D.W." Read (2002)
- Arthur – Dora Winifred "D.W." Read (2002–2006)
- Caillou's Holiday Movie – Elf (2003)
- The Tofus – Phil (2004–2006)
- Postcards from Buster – Dora Winifred "D.W." Read (2004-2006)
- White Night – Kyle (2017)
