= Muskrat Magazine =

Indigenous art and culture online magazine

- Publisher & Editor-in-Chief: Rebeka Tabobondung (Wasauksing Ojibway)
- Staff writers: Erica Commanda (Pikwakanagan Algonquin/Ojibway)
- Categories: literary magazine
- Format: digital
- Founder: Rebeka Tabobondung and David Shilling
- Founded: 2010
- First issue: November 15, 2010
- Country: Canada
- Based in: Toronto, Ontario
- Language: English, primarily
- Website: muskratmagazine.com
- OCLC: 969665888

Muskrat Magazine is an online Indigenous literary, art, and culture publication, published in Toronto. It includes profiles of Indigenous peoples engaged in the arts including literature, film, music, and visual and performing arts.

The publication's name was inspired by the central role of the muskrat in a creation story re-told by Anishnabe storyteller Basil H. Johnston (Wasauksing Ojibway) in his work Ojibway Heritage.

Muskrat Magazine was established by Rebeka Tabobondung (Wasauksing Ojibway) and David Shilling (Ojibway). The founding editor was author Cherie Dimaline (Métis).

The online publication was launched in November 2010, with Tabobondung and Shilling working from their Beverley Street apartment in Toronto. Tabobondung has stated that one of the goals for Muskrat is to explore the history and culture of Canadian Indigenous people in urban cities, where more than 50 percent now live. She and Shilling are cofounders of Maaiingan Productions, a collective of Aboriginal writers and commercial artists who work for a range of corporate and nonprofit clients. Tabobondung and Shilling felt there was a need to start their own publication when one of Maaiingan's clients, the Toronto Native publication Spirit magazine folded in 2008.
