= Joseph Boyden =

Canadian writer

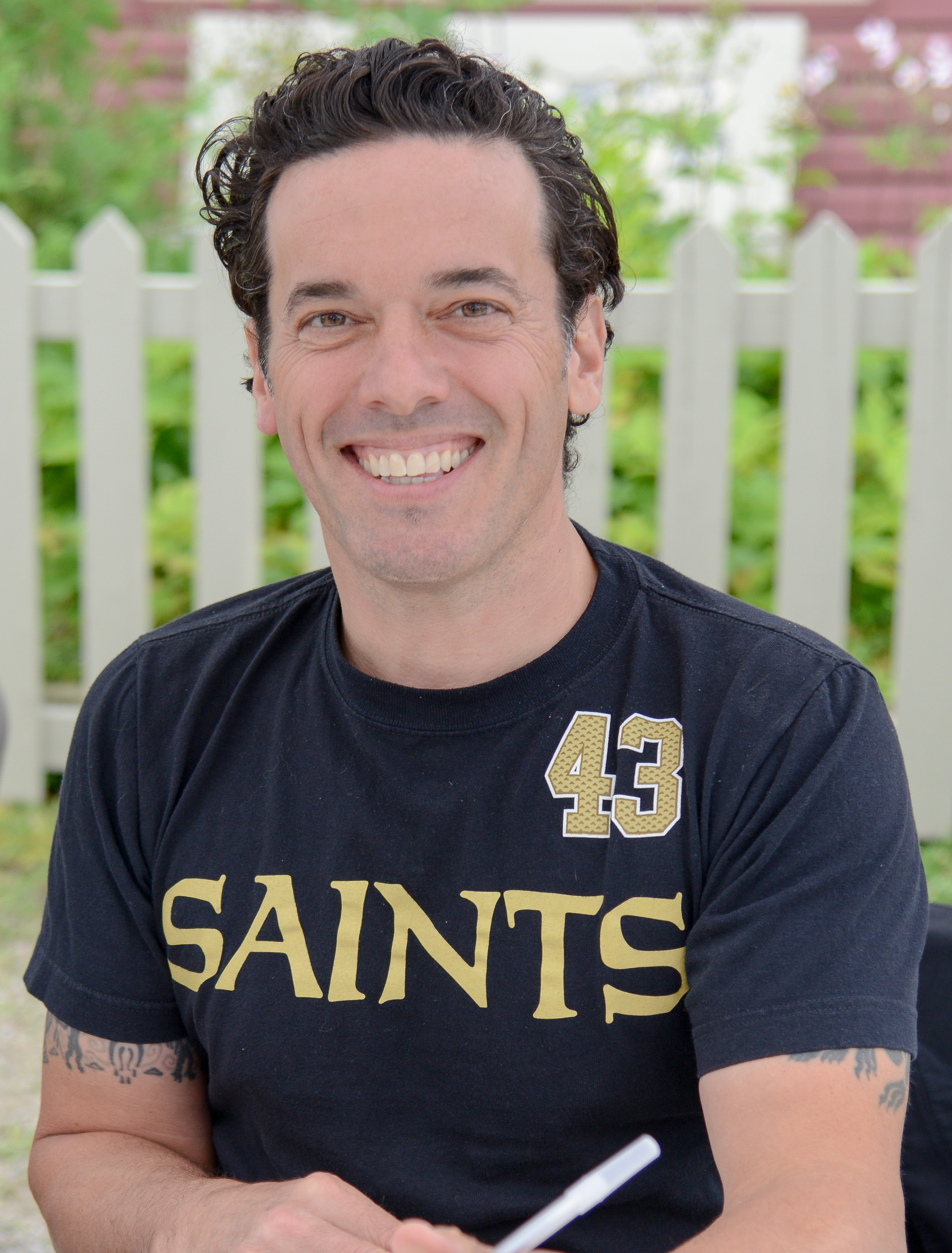
- Boyden at the Eden Mills Writers' Festival in 2013
- Born: October 31, 1966 (age 60); Willowdale, North York, Ontario, Canada
- Education: Brebeuf College School; York University, University of New Orleans
- Occupations: professor, writing mentor, novelist and short story writer
- Writing career
- Genres: historical fiction, First Nations heritage and culture
- Notable works: Three Day Road, Through Black Spruce, The Orenda

Joseph Boyden CM (born October 31, 1966) is a Canadian novelist and short story writer. He is best known for writing about First Nations culture. Three Day Road, a novel about two Cree soldiers serving in the Canadian military during World War I, was inspired by Ojibwa Francis Pegahmagabow, the legendary First World War sniper. Joseph Boyden's second novel, Through Black Spruce, follows the story of Will, son of one of the characters in Three Day Road. The third novel in the Bird family trilogy was published in 2013 as The Orenda.

== Life and career ==
Joseph Boyden grew up in Willowdale, North York, Ontario, and attended the Jesuit-run Brebeuf College School. The ninth of eleven children, he is the son of Blanche (Gosling) and Raymond Wilfrid Boyden, a medical officer renowned for his bravery, who was awarded the Distinguished Service Order and was the most highly decorated medical officer of World War II.

Boyden studied humanities at York University and received an MFA in Fiction from the University of New Orleans in 1995. He was a professor in the Aboriginal Student Program at Northern College during 1995–1997. He taught at the University of New Orleans during 1998–2010, where he served as writer-in-residence. He was also a lecturer with the University of British Columbia's Creative Writing Program during 2013–2015.

In 2014, Boyden accepted a commission from the Royal Winnipeg Ballet to write a ballet about residential schools in Canada. His ballet Going Home Star – Truth and Reconciliation premiered in 2014 and travelled across the country.

== Politics ==
In 2015, Boyden condemned Stephen Harper during the 2015 Canadian federal election, calling his politics "race-baiting" and "fear-mongering".

== Personal life ==
Boyden was married to author Amanda Boyden from 1995 to 2018. In 2020, Amanda Boyden published a memoir, I Got the Dog, in which she wrote about the circumstances that brought on the end of their marriage.

Boyden lives near Georgian Bay, Ontario with his wife Laura and their two sons. In 2019, Boyden wrote about coming home and finding new life in Georgian Bay Today magazine. He is the co-creator of Sweetwater Writers Workshop in Parry Sound, Ontario, Canada. Sweetwater Writers Workshop offers one-on-one mentorships, creative writing workshops and hosts retreats.

== Identification as First Nations ==
Joseph Boyden is primarily of Irish and Scottish ancestry, but has also said he has First Nations heritage. Boyden's self-identified Indigenous heritage became the subject of public dispute when Jorge Barrera published an investigation into Boyden's statements for APTN National News on 23 December 2016. The article focused on inconsistencies in Boyden's accounts of Indigenous heritage and a lack of support for his statements in his family tree. Boyden had previously said he had Mi'kmaq and Métis ancestry, and later said he had Nipmuc and Ojibway heritage. He had previously registered with the Ontario Métis Aboriginal Association, also known as the Woodland Métis Tribe. Barrera also described a 1956 article about Boyden's uncle Earl Boyden, an artist in Algonquin Park who was known as "Injun Joe", which reported that Earl had no "Indian blood". However, Boyden's mother said that her son was researching her family's history, not her husband's. In response to the article, Boyden continued to assert his maternal Ojibway and paternal Nipmuc roots, but said he had only meant he was of mixed blood when he used the term Métis. Rebeka Tabobondung, editor of Muskrat Magazine, said that Boyden had previously told her he was from the Wasauksing First Nation, like her, but she had been unable to confirm this. Boyden's family did own a private island near the community, however.

A number of Indigenous writers and researchers have stated that Boyden is not Indigenous, and that he does not have the right to speak on behalf of Indigenous communities. Indigenous writers, activists and politicians who have responded to Boyden's claims include Wab Kinew, Drew Hayden Taylor Hayden King, and Ryan McMahon. Critics questioned whether his work was authentic, whether he had profited from his self-identification at the expense of people who were recognized First Nations citizens, and whether his statements or presentation of Indigenous subjects were harmful. Some commentators said that positions he had taken publicly undermined ongoing work in Indigenous communities. David Newhouse, chairman of Indigenous studies at Trent University, said that he thought Boyden's self-identification was genuine but that his claims were vague and therefore could not be proven.

In January 2017, Boyden said he had erroneously identified himself as Mi'kmaq in the past and that he was a "white kid with native roots". He said he had not relied on his identity as an Indigenous person to popularize his books, and had only won one literary prize based on heritage which awarded only a small amount of money. He apologized for taking up too much of the "air space" and stated he would do less public speaking, thus allowing Indigenous voices to be heard in the media. Later that year, Boyden said he had taken a DNA test which listed "Native American DNA"; critics said a DNA test was not proof of Native American identity.

Subsequent reports by Canadaland and others questioned several inconsistencies in Boyden's recent statements, and failed to corroborate any Native ancestry. After his own investigation into Boyden, journalist Eric Andrew Gee said:

Months of research, travel spanning Ontario, and dozens of interviews with scholars, colleagues, friends and extended family members have not yielded a definitive answer about whether Boyden is "really" Indigenous, and probably never could. In part, that is a challenge peculiar to him. Neither Boyden nor any member of his immediate family would agree to be interviewed for this article. Boyden has taken care to maintain control of his story.

When the public discourse about Boyden's heritage impacted the release of his new novel, Ojibway filmmaker Lisa Meeches said she would adopt Boyden as a spiritual sibling, saying she was motivated both by her brother's recent death and by a desire to protect Boyden's work.

== Honours ==
=== Honorary doctorates and degrees ===
Institution	Award	Year Awarded
Nipissing University	Honorary Doctor of Letters	2009
Wilfrid Laurier University	Honorary Doctor of Letters	2012
Algoma University	Honorary degree	2013
Humber College	Honorary degree	2013
Trent University	Honorary Doctor of Letters	2014

=== Others ===
Boyden was awarded the Queen Elizabeth II Diamond Jubilee Medal in 2013. He was on the board of the Canadian Civil Liberties Association.

On December 30, 2015, Boyden was appointed as a Member of the Order of Canada "for his contributions as an author, who tells stories of our common heritage, and for his social engagement, notably in support of First Nations".

== Bibliography ==
=== Novels ===
- Three Day Road. Toronto: Penguin Canada, 2005. (winner, the inaugural McNally Robinson Aboriginal Book of the Year Award; winner, the Amazon/Books in Canada First Novel Award; winner, the Rogers Writers' Trust Fiction Prize, 2006; included in Canada Reads 2006; longlisted for the 2007 International Dublin Literary Award; nominated for the 2005 Governor General's Awards)
- Through Black Spruce. Toronto: Penguin Canada, 2008. (winner of the Scotiabank Giller Prize, November 2008)
- The Orenda. Toronto: Hamish Hamilton, 2013. (longlisted for the 2013 Scotiabank Giller Prize, shortlisted nominee for the 2013 Governor General's Award for English fiction, winner of the 2014 Canada Reads competition)
- Wenjack. Toronto: Penguin Canada, 2016.

=== Short stories ===
- Born With a Tooth Toronto: Cormorant Books, 2008 (from publishers page in book)

=== Non-fiction ===
- From Mushkegowuk to New Orleans: A Mixed Blood Highway. Edmonton: NeWest, 2008
- Extraordinary Canadians: Louis Riel And Gabriel Dumont. Toronto: Penguin Canada, 2010
- Kwe: Standing With Our Sisters. (editor) Toronto: Penguin Canada, 2014. (An anthology with more than fifty contributors to raise awareness of the crisis facing Indigenous women in Canada, with all proceeds going to Amnesty International's No More Stolen Sisters campaign)
