= Parveen Kaur (Canadian actress) =

Canadian actress

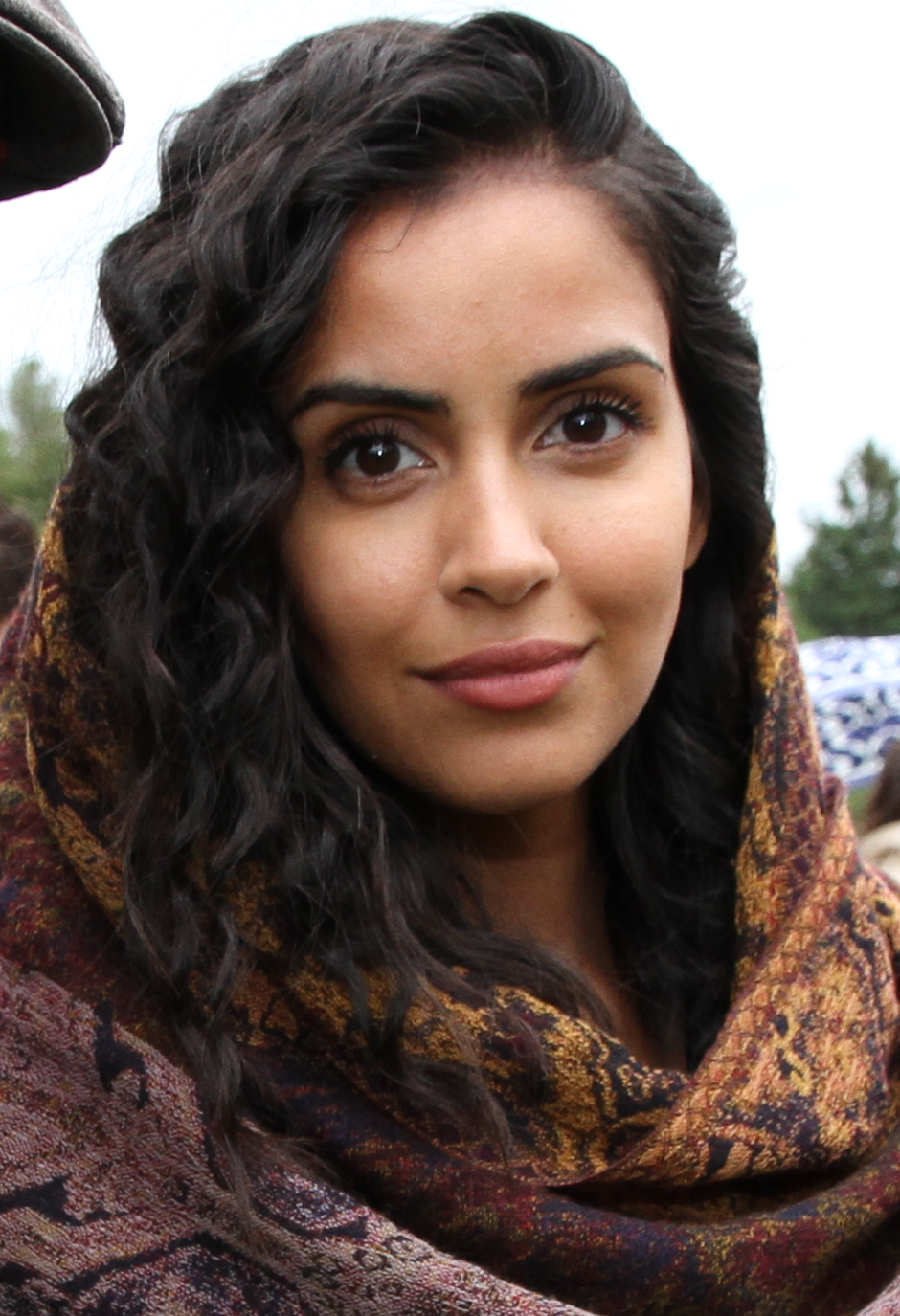
- Parveen Kaur in 2015, filming the short film Chameleon.
- Born: Okanagan, Canada
- Occupation: Actress
- Years active: 2013–present
- Works: Full list

Parveen Kaur is a Canadian actress. In her early career, Kaur had roles in the television series The Strain (2015), Saving Hope (2015–2016), and Beyond (2017–2018). She gained recognition for portraying scientist Saanvi Bahl in the NBC/Netflix supernatural drama series Manifest (2018–2023) and has also acted in the Canadian films White Night (2017), Through Black Spruce (2018), and American Hangman (2019).

== Early life ==
Parveen was born and raised in the Okanagan Valley, British Columbia, Canada. She is of Indian origin, her parents having moved to Canada from Mumbai, Maharashtra, India before she was born. At the age of 18, she moved to Toronto.

== Career ==
Kaur only decided to pursue an acting career in her 20s after leaving high school early. Kaur’s first recurring role came in 2015, in Guillermo del Toro’s horror drama series The Strain. The same year she landed a recurring role as Doctor Asha Mirani in the Canadian supernatural medical drama television series Saving Hope.

In 2018, Kaur starred in the movie Through Black Spruce, which premiered at the 2018 Toronto International Film Festival. Kaur starred in a main role as Saanvi for 4 seasons (62 episodes) of Manifest between 2018 and 2023.

== Awards ==
Kaur received the 2017 MISAFF Star presented by ACTRA at the 6th annual Mosaic International South Asian Film Festival in Mississauga, Ontario.

== Filmography ==
=== Film ===
Year	Title	Role
2013	Five Dollars (Short)	Natalie
2014	Latter (Short)	Cass
2014	The Strain	Madji
2015	Chameleon (Short)	Poorti
2017	White Night	Emily
2017	Worst Part (Short)	Graphic Designer
2017	Ruby's Tuesday (Short)	Anu
2018	Through Black Spruce	Geeta
2018	Edging	Bree
2018	Acquainted	Michelle
2019	American Hangman	Kaitlyn
2025	What We Dreamed of Then	Navleen

=== Television ===
Year	Title	Role	Notes
2013	Played	Jewelry Store Woman	Episode - Money
2014	Working the Engels	Vanessa	Episode - Picture Night
2015	Defiance	Augusta - 307	Episode - The Beauty of Our Weapons
2015	The Strain	Aanya Gupta	4 episodes
2015–2016	Saving Hope	Dr. Asha Mirani	11 episodes
2017–2018	Beyond	Christine	8 episodes
2017	American Gods	Young Persian Woman	Episode - Come to Jesus
2018	Workin' Moms	Lucy Crushner	3 episodes
2018	9-1-1	Savita Kapoor	Episode - Point of Origin
2018–2023	Manifest	Dr. Saanvi Bahl	Main role
2020	Find a Way or Make One	Kaitlyn	Episode - Are You Still?
