= Noot Seear =

Canadian fashion model and actress (born 1983)

- Born: Renata Seear; October 5, 1983 (age 43); Vancouver, British Columbia, Canada
- Modeling information
- Height: 1.75 m (5 ft 9 in)
- Hair color: Light Brown
- Eye color: Blue
- Agency: One Management (New York); Viva Models (Paris)

Noot Seear (born Renata Seear, October 5, 1983) is a Canadian fashion model and actress.

== Life and career ==
Seear was born in Vancouver, British Columbia. She was discovered in a shopping mall by a scout from the Look agency in Vancouver when she was 14 years old. She then began modelling in her home town in 1996. In 1997, she moved to New York City in order to further her career and gain more exposure. Seear's catwalk debut came in September 1998 at New York Fashion Week, where she walked for Calvin Klein, Daryl K and Ralph Lauren.

She has appeared in advertising campaigns for brands such as Chanel, Giorgio Armani, Kenzo, Alor, Pantene Pro-V, Ralph Lauren Polo Jeans, Kenneth Cole, Neiman Marcus, Alberta Ferretti, Rolex and Yves Saint Laurent, where she was memorably styled as the Mona Lisa by Leonardo da Vinci for the Rive Gauche ad campaign in 1998. Notably, she has been the face of two fragrances: Calvin Klein ck one and Vera Wang by Vera Wang.

Seear has appeared on the cover of Elle Germany, Amica (Italy), D (Italy) and Vogue Nippon and has been photographed by Patrick Demarchelier, Mario Sorrenti and Paolo Roversi.

During her career, she has walked the runway for designers such as Balenciaga, Lanvin, Karl Lagerfeld, Alexander Wang, Proenza Schouler, Ralph Lauren, Diane von Furstenberg, Givenchy, Chanel and Alexander McQueen.

Seear has also pursued a career as an actress, and played the role of Heidi in the sequel to the movie Twilight, New Moon. Seear also made a guest appearance in season 2 of House of Lies in the episode "Damonschildren.org".

== Filmography ==
Film and television roles
Year	Title	Role	Notes
1999	Cold Squad	Cindy	TV series (Episode: "Dead End")
2001	Head Over Heels	KC Girl	
2006	Whistler	Holy	TV series (Episode: "Scratching the Surface")
2007	Kaya	Kissing Model	TV series (Episode: "Sympathy for the Devil")
2009	The Twilight Saga: New Moon	Heidi	
2010	The Suitcase	-	Short film
2011	Special Things to Do	Cat Cedar / CC	Short film
2011	Burial	Jessie	Short film
2012	Scruples	Melanie Adams	TV film
2013	House of Lies	Supermodel	TV series (Episode: "Damonschildren.org")
2014	Electric Slide	Amazonian Twin	
