= Wasauksing First Nation =

Indian reserve in Ontario, Canada

Wasauksing First Nation Waaseyakosing
- Indian reserve
- Parry Island First Nation Indian Reserve
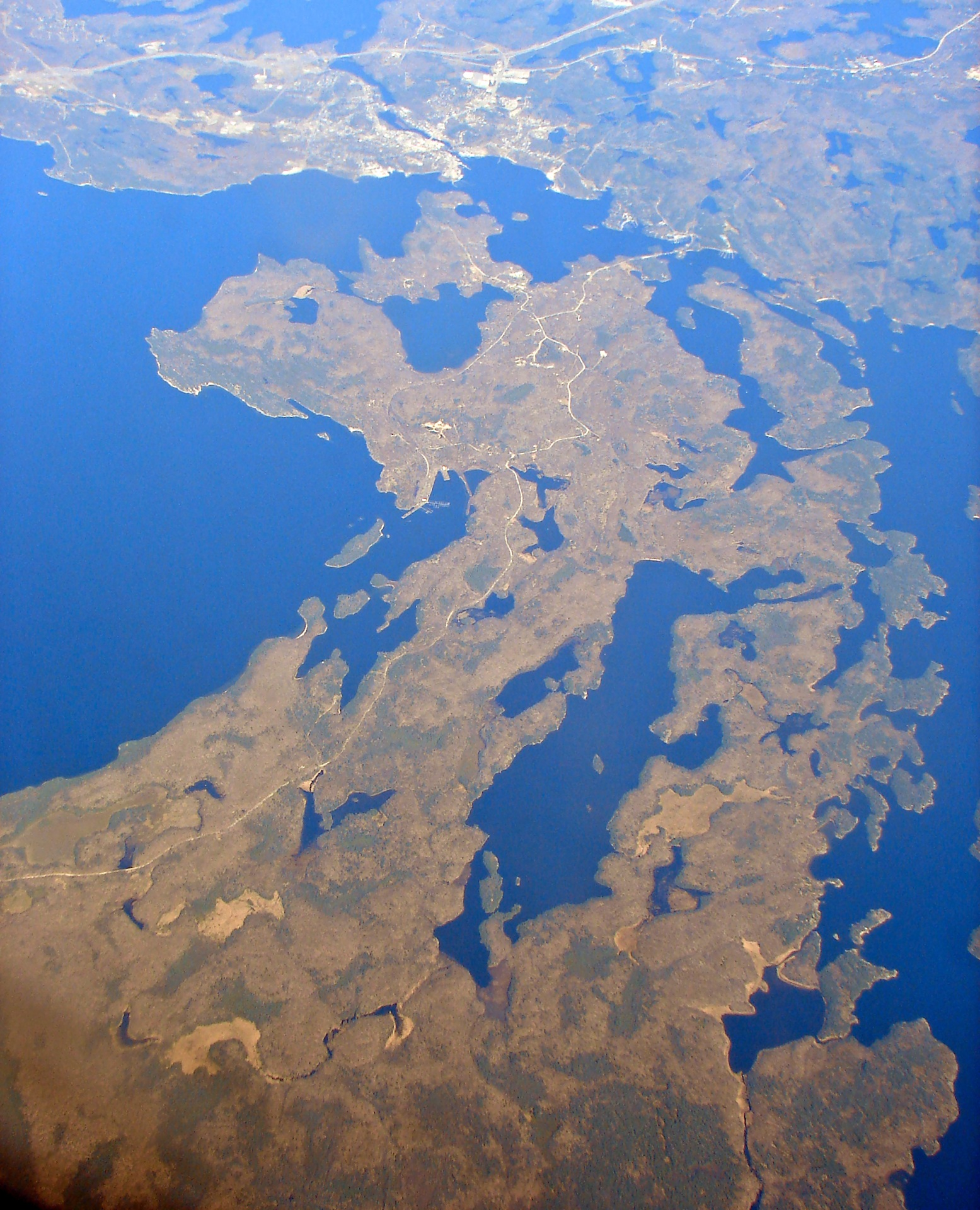
- Aerial view of Parry Island, with the town of Parry Sound visible at the top.

- Location within Southern Ontario
- Coordinates: 45°17′N 80°09′W
- Country: Canada
- Province: Ontario
- District: Parry Sound
- First Nation: Wasauksing

Area
  - Land: 72.36 km^{2} (27.94 sq mi)

Population (2011)
  - Total: 419
  - Density: 5.8/km^{2} (15/sq mi)
- Website: www.wasauksing.ca

Wasauksing First Nation (formerly Parry Island First Nation; Ojibwe: Waaseyakosing, meaning "Place that shines brightly in the reflection of the sacred light") is an Ojibway, Odawa and Pottawatomi First Nation band government whose reserve is located near Parry Sound in Ontario, Canada.

The reserve constitutes Parry Island in Georgian Bay. The island is about 19,000 acres (77 km^{2}) with 78 miles (126 km) of lakeshore, making it one of the larger islands in the Great Lakes. The Wasauksing First Nation now occupies the entire island, although the ghost town of Depot Harbour on the island was historically a non-aboriginal settlement.

== History ==
The Indigenous people first came to the shores of Mnidoo-gamii (The Great Lake of the Spirit), or Georgian Bay, during a great travel from the eastern areas of Canada from around 900CE to 1600CE. Many of the Indigenous travellers settled to protect others on their travels from attacks from the Haudenosaunee, and later on early European Settlers. Due to its navigable waterways, rich local hunting grounds, and spiritual significance, the region became an important hub for the Anishinaabek.

By the 1800s Parry Island was settled by three different Indigenous groups. Following the signing of the Robinson-Huron Treaty and the establishment of the Nation's boundaries. They settled in two locations known as Niisaakiing (Upper Village) and Nishnaabe-oodenaang (Lower Village). Around the 1880s, two additional villages of Potawatomi and Ojibwe people settled in Gamiing (Middle Village).

The Wasauksing Swing Bridge was created in 1887 by the OA&PS, connecting the island to the main land. In 1892, a non-Indigenous settlement was made on the island. Depot Harbour was founded in 1892 as a railway company town by John Rudolphus Booth, owner of the Ottawa, Arnprior and Parry Sound Railway (OA&PS) as the western terminus for his railway. Depot Harbour would go on to become one of the most important Great Lakes shipping ports. Depot Harbour featured the best natural harbour on the Great Lakes and was the shortest route for shipping grain to the Atlantic Ocean. Trains bringing goods were arriving and departing every twenty minutes. Goods were brought in from by ship from Chicago, Duluth and Milwaukee, and transported by the railway to ports in Montreal and Portland, Maine, where they were loaded onto Canada Atlantic Transit Company ships. Booth sold the railway to the Grand Trunk Railway in 1904, who continued to operate the Depot Harbour port. In 1923, the Grand Trunk became part of Canadian National Railways.

Several factors lead to the decline of Depot Harbour, such as the construction of the Welland Canal in 1932. The portion of the railway line in Algonquin Provincial Park was abandoned in 1933, when trestle near Cache Lake was damaged beyond repair. As a result, trains no longer traveled to Depot Harbour from Algonquin Park. On 14 August 1945, while the grain elevators were being torn down, they caught fire. A strong wind carried embers across the harbour and ignited the warehouses. The fire brightly illuminated Parry Sound, seven kilometres to the north. From 1926 to the late 1970s the area slowly became abandoned. The area was returned to the First Nation in 1987.

The First Nation is also known for being the community of Canadian WW1 hero, Francis Pegahmagabow (1891–1952). Pegahmagabow became the most highly decorated Indigenous soldier in Canadian military history and the most effective sniper of the First World War. Later on he became Chief of Wasauksing First Nation in 1921 to 1925 and again from 1942 to 1945. In 1943, he became the Supreme Chief of The Native Independent Government, an early First Nations organization.

Furthermore, the First Nation is known for electing one of the first female First Nation's chiefs, Florence Adelette (Partridge) Tabobondung (1921 - 2006), in 1959. Ms Tabobondung led the First Nations community for 27 years, between 1959 and 1986. Flora was one of the Chiefs that travelled to England in 1982 when the Constitution was brought back to Canada. Flora is a recipient of the Order of Canada and received an honorary degree from York University in 1998.

== Community ==
The reserve is home to a community radio station, CHRZ-FM. In addition, the indigenous magazine MUSKRAT is located Wasauksing First Nation community as well.

== Transportation ==
The reserve's main road crosses to the mainland via the Wasauksing Swing Bridge, connecting to Rose Point Road in Seguin Township south of Parry Sound. The road continues to Parry Sound itself, becoming Emily Street at the municipal boundary of Parry Sound and Seguin.

== Notable members ==
- Basil Johnston (1929 - 2015), historian and cultural essayist
- Barry "Hawk" Tabobondung (1961 - 2000), Canadian ice hockey player.
- Francis Pegahmagabow (1891 - 1952), the most highly decorated Indigenous soldier in Canadian military history,
- Florence Tabobondung (1921 - 2006), former Chief of Wasauksing First Nation.
- Waubgeshig Rice (1979 - living), writer and broadcaster.
- William McGrath (2006 - living), Canadian folk/country musician and performing artist.
