= Wasauksing Swing Bridge =

Coordinates: 45°18′54″N 80°2′40″W

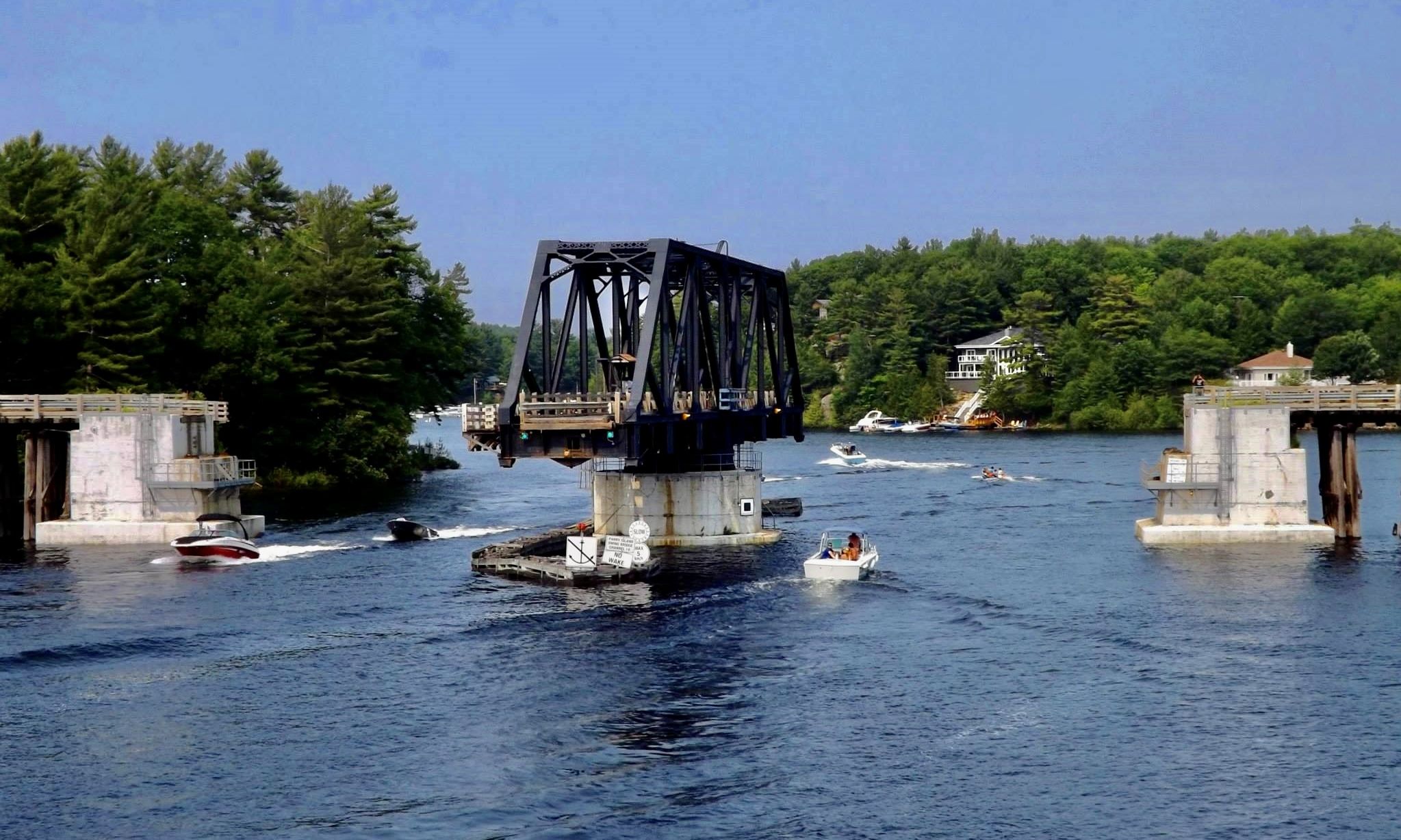
Wasauksing Swing Bridge as seen from aboard the Island Queen V in 2015

The Wasauksing Swing Bridge spans the South Channel, a narrow channel of Georgian Bay between the Rose Point on the mainland and an island commonly known as Parry Island (the Wasauksing First Nation), near Parry Sound, Ontario, Canada.

The bridge was built by the Ottawa, Arnprior and Parry Sound Railway to provide rail access to Depot Harbour. The bridge is sometimes referred to by its former name, the "Rose Point Swing Bridge".

A bridge was first built at this location in 1887 (139 years ago) (some sources indicate 1888) and was replaced by the current structure in 1912 (114 years ago). The twin-towered Rose Point station was formerly located immediately adjacent to this bridge on the mainland side.

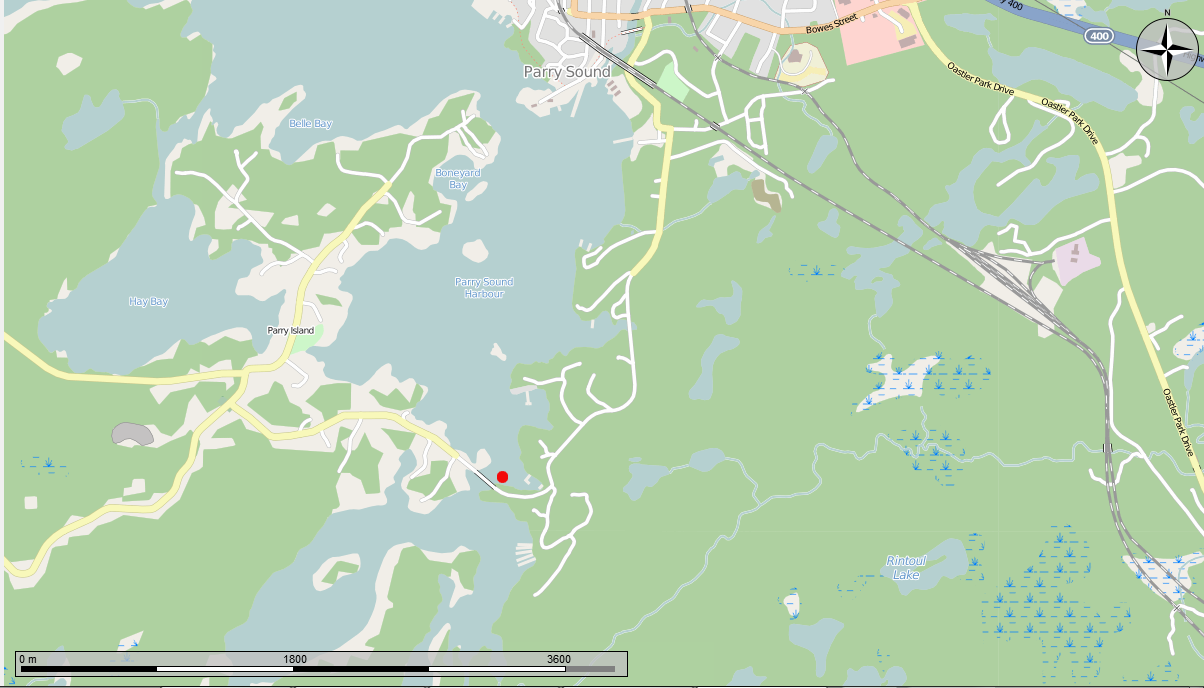
Wasauksing Swing Bridge marked with a red dot. The railway tracks are far-removed from the actual bridge, to the right of the image.

The bridge was built for rail traffic only, but was modified for use by both rail and vehicle traffic at a later date. Rail service ended and the rails were removed in 1989. The bridge is now used for one lane of vehicular traffic, and still opens regularly to allow passage of boats. There are traffic lights at each end both to regulate traffic in alternate directions and also (along with barricades), to provide protection when the bridge is open. The bridge is the only road access for members of the Wasauksing First Nation, as well as many summer cottages located on the island. A sidewalk has also been added to one side of the bridge.

In 1997, the bridge piers received a rehabilitation by Underground Services (1983) Ltd. A speed limit of 5 km/h (speed over ground) was put in place in 1998 for vessels passing through this bridge.
