= Rose Point, Massachusetts =

Coordinates: 41°44′19″N 70°44′58″W

Rose Point is a very small peninsula located in the town of Wareham, Massachusetts, United States. It is formed by the splitting of the Sippican River into the Weweantic River. In 2005, sewer lines were extended to Rose Point and nearby Briarwood Beach to reduce pollution from reaching the rivers.

== Geography ==
Rose Point begins just east of Interstate 195, as a relatively wide swath of land from southwest to northeast and then gradually narrows toward its south easternmost point at the junction of the two rivers. The physical landscape is gently sloping, with elevation ranging from sea level along the river shore to approximately 45 ft/13.7 m along the upper portion of Barlow Avenue. Despite very sandy soil, the point is heavily wooded. Vegetation consists primarily of white pine, pitch pine, cedar, and scrub oak with a few maples and other coniferous and deciduous trees sprinkled throughout.

== Climate ==
The climate is Humid Continental: Warm Summers, typical of the south coast of Massachusetts. The rivers and nearby Buzzards Bay often provide refreshing breezes on otherwise uncomfortably hot and humid summer days, especially along the southwestern side of the Point. Winters are also moderated to a slight degree by the surrounding water bodies.
