= Through Black Spruce =

Book by Joseph Boyden

- First edition
- Author: Joseph Boyden
- Genre: Canadian literature, First Nations
- Publisher: Viking Canada
- Publication date: September 9, 2008
- Publication place: Canada
- Media type: Print (Hardback)
- Pages: 360 p. (Viking Canada (Penguin Group) hardcover edition)
- ISBN: 978-0-670-06363-5 (Penguin Group Canada)
- OCLC: 225774686
- Preceded by: Three Day Road
- Followed by: The Orenda

Through Black Spruce is a novel by Canadian writer Joseph Boyden, published in 2008 by Viking Press. It is Boyden's second novel and third published book.

Through Black Spruce was named the winner of the 2008 Scotiabank Giller Prize on November 11, 2008.

== Plot summary ==
Through Black Spruce is set in Moosonee, Ontario and is narrated by Will Bird and his niece Annie Bird with the narration switching between chapters.

Will, a former bush pilot, is in a coma. Over the course of the novel Will recounts to his nieces, Annie and Suzanne, the events of the previous year which led to him being in a coma. Meanwhile, in the present day, Annie recounts the previous year of her life and her sojourns to Toronto, Montreal, New York City and Moose Factory Ontario to see Will in an attempt to help him revive from his coma.

== Film adaptation ==
A film adaptation by Don McKellar was released in 2018, receiving two Canadian Screen Award nominations at the 7th Canadian Screen Awards in 2019, for Best Actor (Brandon Oakes) and Best Original Score (Alaska B), winning the latter.
