= Flybar =

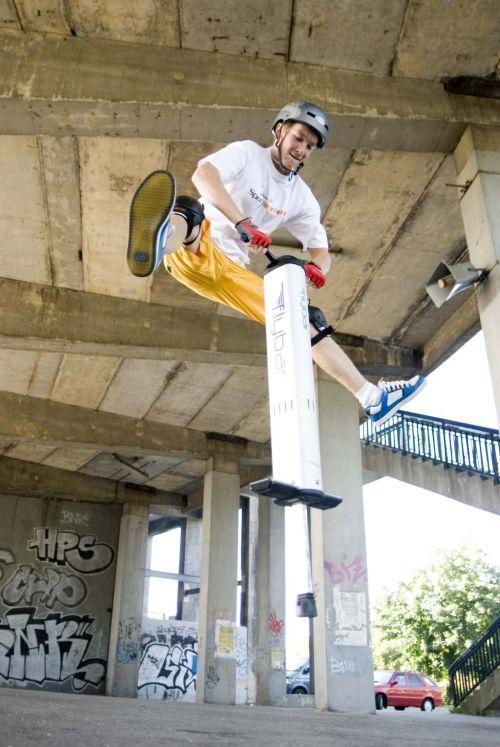
Flybar 1200 2006 starts Prague Strahov

Flybar may also refer to an element of the helicopter rotor.

The Flybar is a modification of the traditional pogo stick design which allows riders to propel themselves up to a world record 8 feet 6 inches into the air according to the Flybar's website. Developed in a collaborative effort between SBI Enterprises, Bruce Middleton and Andy Macdonald, it utilizes in place of the usual steel spring in a regular pogo stick 12 elastic bands used for propulsion, also known as thrusters. It weighs 20 pounds (9 kilograms) and is capable of producing up to 1,200 pounds-force (5,300 newtons) of thrust. The Flybar comes in another model, the Flybar 800, which is intended for lighter people.

== See also ==
- Stunt Pogo
- Pogo Stick
- Vurtego
- Powerbocking
