= Arthur season 3 =

Arthur
- Season 3
- European DVD cover (Note: This release is marketed on the cover as the fourth season, but this release actually has every episode from the third season.)
- No. of episodes: 15 (30 segments)

Release
- Original network: PBS
- Original release: November 16, 1998 – January 1, 1999

Season chronology
- ← Previous; Season 2 Next → Season 4

The third season of the television series Arthur was originally broadcast on PBS in the United States from November 16, 1998 to January 1, 1999 and contains 15 episodes. This season, like seasons 1 and 2, was released on DVD in Europe only (as "Series 4").

This was the last season in which Michael Caloz voiced the character D.W. Read, due to his voice deepening after the end of the season.

Funding for Arthur's third season was provided by the Corporation for Public Broadcasting, PBS viewers, and corporate sponsors Juicy Juice, Polaroid Corporation, and Baby GAP.

== Episodes ==
No. overall	No. in season	Title	Written by	Storyboard by	Original release date	Prod. code
51a	1a	"Buster's Back"	Joe Fallon	Gerry Capelle	November 16, 1998	51B
Buster is returning to Elwood City (after leaving in "Arthur's Faraway Friend"), and while Arthur is initially excited, he worries that Buster has changed during his travels. Fearing that Buster will find him lame after his exciting travels, Arthur reads books on the places Buster has visited. When Buster returns, he says that he never changed and is looking forward to hanging out with Arthur, and the two play checkers to celebrate.
51b	1b	"The Ballad of Buster Baxter"	Joe Fallon	Stéfanie Gignac	November 16, 1998	52A
Buster feels left out because of the things he unexperienced while he was away, while rumors about his travels cause his friends to consider him a snob. Arthur throws a surprise party for him, with everyone joining in to help, but when Buster is unable to show, Muffy thinks this affirms the rumors until they realize that they did not invite him at all. When Buster attends the party, he enjoys it and reunites with his friends. A singing moose narrates Buster's story throughout the episode. Guest star: Art Garfunkel as a singing moose.
52a	2a	"D.W. All Fired Up"	Peter K. Hirsch	Stéfanie Gignac	November 17, 1998	56B
D.W. is scared of an upcoming fire drill in her preschool, so the other Reads names her a fire warden and runs fire drills in their house to ease her fears. During the drill, D.W. is able to calm her friends down and lead them outside safely.
52b	2b	"I'd Rather Read It Myself"	Joe Fallon	Robert Yap	November 17, 1998	55B
D.W. wants to prove to the Tibbles that she can do something they can't do, so she pretends to read them a book, while instead making up a story about a D.W. look-alike named "B.W." Arthur thinks that the Tibbles will find out about D.W.'s trick, while D.W. is glad that she could be better than them for the day. The Tibbles ask to borrow the book, and when their grandmother reads it to them, they learn that it is instead about Leonardo da Vinci, but think it is a "magic book" that changes whenever it is read.
53a	3a	"Arthur Goes Crosswire"	Chris Moore	Nick Rijgersberg & Jeremy O'Neill	November 18, 1998	53A
Arthur and Muffy are paired up for a class project about an animal of their choice. They choose to report on a whale and go whale watching as part of it. While at sea, Arthur and Muffy rescue famous actor Wilbur Rabbit, causing Arthur to copy Muffy's uptight behavior. Arthur's other friends try to get him to change back to normal by imitating his behavior during a baseball game, and Arthur quits copying Muffy.
53b	3b	"Sue Ellen and the Brainasaurous"	Chris Moore & Ken Scarborough	Robert Yap	November 18, 1998	57B
Sue Ellen and the Brain choose to build a dinosaur model for their animal project. Sue Ellen wants to help, but the Brain refuses to let her, paranoid that her model will be inaccurate. When the Brain ends up doing the entire project by himself and neglects to use Sue Ellen's model, they fight with each other and end up dropping the Brain's model; Sue Ellen turns this into a dig site exhibit, which gets them a good grade. Meanwhile, Francine is paired with Buster, who avoids her so he does not have to work. Note: This episode is set as the same time in “Arthur Goes Crosswire”
54a	4a	"Background Blues"	Peter K. Hirsch	Robert Yap	November 19, 1998	53B
The class is asked to research their ancestors for a school project. Muffy and Francine try to best one another with who their ancestors were, with Muffy believing that her family has descended from royalty, while Francine believes her ancestors are famous. Both separately became disappointed that their ancestors were just "plain folks". However, Francine's grandfather teaches her about an ancestor of hers who advised Abraham Lincoln to trim his beard, which Francine presents for the project.
54b	4b	"And Now Let's Talk to Some Kids"	Joe Fallon	Stéfanie Gignac	November 19, 1998	58B
TV series called The Magic Toolbox is coming to Mr. Ratburn's class to put the kids on television. The kids practice their various talents, but the Brain is the only one with no interest in appearing on the show. When the rest of the class are interviewed on the show and struggle to answer the science questions they are given, the Brain helps them.
55a	5a	"The Chips Are Down"	Joe Fallon	Stéfanie Gignac	November 20, 1998	54B
Arthur and Buster trick D.W. into thinking that the big, green potato chip she ate was poisonous. Rather than admit to eating it, D.W. becomes friends with Binky, who had eaten one as well. Believing he is close to death, Binky is motivated to reveal his private passion of ballet, impressing his friends.
55b	5b	"Revenge of the Chip"	Dietrich Smith	Mario Cabrera	November 20, 1998	56B
When the story of D.W. believing the green potato chip is poison (from "The Chips Are Down") becomes a story in the newspapers, she promptly blames Arthur for telling about it. D.W. finds out that Mrs. Read is the one telling people about the story, and tells her how upsetting it is. Mrs. Read apologizes and promises not to repeat the story. D.W., in turn, apologizes to Arthur, who invites D.W. to a live show where Binky performs a ballet about his experience with eating a green chip. However, while waiting in line for the show to start, D.W. overhears her mother talking to Mrs. MacGrady about the newspaper article. Thinking she broke her promise, an upset D.W. runs to a nearby pier, where Binky is warming up for the ballet. Mrs. Read explains to D.W. why she was talking about the story. They reconcile and Mrs. Read agrees to not discuss the green chip article to protect her daughter. Arthur, D.W., and Mrs. Read then enjoy Binky's ballet.
56a	6a	"Binky Rules"	Sandra Willard	Robert Yap	November 23, 1998	51A
When graffiti reading "Binky Rules" mysteriously appears on the walls of the school, Binky is blamed for it. Buster and Fern act as detectives to prove Binky's innocence, but it leads to a debate between the boys and girls over who can solve the mystery better. To make matters worse, Buster teases Fern for her detective style and also annoys her with nicknames and weird slang she cannot understand. After listening to a song, they find out that the graffiti was caused by a local radio station promoting a new band called "BINKY". Note: The song by "BINKY" is performed by Finnish band Värttinä.
56b	6b	"Meet Binky"	Sandra Willard	Jeremy O'Neill & Larry Jacobs	November 23, 1998	55A
BINKY, the band (from "Binky Rules"), becomes a huge hit in Elwood City, and a concert is planned to expose a big secret about the band. Arthur is able to go backstage due to Mr. Read catering the concert, and worries that if he invites his friends, it will interfere with him befriending the band. He changes his mind and lets them come, thinking that it would be more fun to go with his friends. However, Arthur learns that BINKY is actually a group of holograms and is not real. Note: The song by "BINKY" is performed by Finnish band Värttinä.
57a	7a	"Arthur Rides the Bandwagon"	Peter K. Hirsch	Robert Shedlowich & Mario Cabrera	November 24, 1998	52B
Arthur is unimpressed with new cute toys called "Woogles", but after seeing how popular they are, he tries to get one. After several failed attempts, he gets a Woogle from Grandma Thora, but then he starts playing with a bottle cap and starts a new fad.
57b	7b	"Dad's Dessert Dilemma"	Sandra Willard	Jeremy O'Neill & Alex Greychuck	November 24, 1998	59A
Arthur brings a cake Mr. Read made to a party in Mr. Ratburn's class celebrating Galileo's birthday. Everyone enjoys the cake, so Arthur brings in even more desserts to build his school popularity, unaware of the work he is imposing on Mr. Read until he sees that he made him fall behind on a crucial order for Ed. Arthur and D.W. then assist Mr. Read with his baking. Throughout the episode, Mr. Ratburn keeps using a spring reading list as an excuse to join Arthur's parties and eat all of his cakes.
58a	8a	"Popular Girls"	Sandra Willard	Jeremy O'Neill	November 25, 1998	57A
Francine inadvertently takes Catherine's backpack to the community center and discovers a magazine called Popular Girl. After taking a personality quiz, Sue Ellen and Fern change their personalities to be more "likable". Sue Ellen goes from being an expert to quiet and not speaking up, while Fern becomes loud and bossy, both causing chaos in their groups.
58b	8b	"Buster's Growing Grudge"	Joe Fallon	Robert Yap & Daniel Decelles	November 25, 1998	60B
Buster holds a growing grudge against Binky for telling a joke in class that Buster intended to tell. Arthur tries to console him before the grudge overtakes Buster. In the end, Buster settles his grudge by talking with Binky, who was unaware how under the weather Buster was.
59a	9a	"Arthur's Treasure Hunt"	Stephen Krensky	Mario Cabrera & Rich Vanatte	November 26, 1998	54A
When Buster finds an ancient arrowhead in Bitzi's garden, Arthur digs up his backyard to find treasure, but his search goes too far when it quickly spreads to the front yard, where Mrs. Read told him it was the "no-dig zone". When she arrives home, she is disappointed and Arthur is sentenced to his room for two weeks.
59b	9b	"The Return of the King"	Peter K. Hirsch	Mario Cabrera	November 26, 1998	61B
Mr. Ratburn's class is at a medieval fair, competing for a trophy against a very intelligent and alternative Lakewood class (who bear striking resemblances to Arthur and his classmates) led by Mr. Ratburn's former teacher, Mr. Pryce-Jones. Mr. Ratburn's class loses constantly until Arthur beats the other class in a "sword in the stone" challenge by figuring out the riddle the challenge's caller recites. Arthur is crowned king of the medieval fair, cheered on by both classes and congratulated by Mr. Pryce-Jones and Mr. Ratburn. Mr. Pryce-Jones realizes that Mr. Ratburn taught his class something he himself never did: to think for themselves.
60a	10a	"Attack of the Turbo Tibbles"	Joe Fallon	Robert Yap	November 27, 1998	58A
The Tibbles watch a violent cartoon and start dressing and acting like the protagonists: a duo of superhero crime-fighting robots. They play roughly while pretending to fight crime and throw a swing into D.W.'s face, sending her to the emergency room. They apologize and agree not to watch the show anymore, and D.W. forgives them.
60b	10b	"D.W. Tricks the Tooth Fairy"	Joe Fallon	Stéfanie Gignac	November 27, 1998	60A
D.W. wants her loose tooth pulled out so that the Tooth Fairy can leave her dollars for a toy barn for her unicorn doll. When her plans fail, she tries to trick the Tooth Fairy with a fake tooth. Arthur replaces the tooth with his money, worried that the Tooth Fairy could be offended by the fake tooth.
61a	11a	"Double Tibble Trouble"	Peter K. Hirsch	Stéfanie Gignac	December 28, 1998	65A
Tommy is upset and less active because Timmy is ill. Although D.W. and Emily would like to have the Tibbles less hyperactive, they try to help Tommy out by playing like a Tibble, but they are not as hyperactive as the twins.
61b	11b	"Arthur's Almost Live Not Real Music Festival"	Joe Fallon & Ken Scarborough	Robert Yap	December 28, 1998	65B
Arthur and Buster have an imaginary music festival, with the entire cast performing music videos of Library Card, Jekyll and Hyde, Leftovers Goulash, Just A Little Homework, and Library Card: Reprise from the Arthur and Friends: The First Almost Real Not Live CD (or Tape) soundtrack record.
62a	12a	"What Scared Sue Ellen?"	Bruce Akiyama	Stéfanie Gignac	December 29, 1998	62B
Sue Ellen, who dismisses Arthur, Buster, and Binky's scary stories, is frightened by a mysterious howl in the woods, which she thinks is Baba Yaga, a kappa, or a banshee. She enlists the help of Arthur, Buster, and Binky to investigate the ruckus. They find out that the howl is coming from Mrs. Woods' dog, Perky (from "Arthur's Pet Business"), who got stuck in a tree stump.
62b	12b	"Clarissa is Cracked"	Sandra Willard	Bulent Karabagli & Marcos Da Silva	December 29, 1998	63B
D.W. borrows Grandma Thora's porcelain doll, Clarissa, and plays with her every day, but the doll is broken in pieces. She tries to fix Clarissa, and Arthur brings her to Mr. Ratburn to repair her.
63a	13a	"Arthur's Dummy Disaster"	Peter K. Hirsch	Mario Cabrera	December 30, 1998	59B
George Lundgren's new ventriloquist's giraffe dummy, Wally, makes him popular and starts a short-lived ventriloquism fad at school. He starts acting less rationally as Wally begins falling apart, and Arthur tries to convince George that he does not need Wally to make friends.
63b	13b	"Francine and the Feline"	Sandra Willard	Robert Yap	December 30, 1998	61A
Francine's family gets a new cat, who Catherine tries to name "Rose Petal" and pampers him, but the cat grows fond of Francine and she renames him "Nemo". When she tries to show Nemo to her friends, Arthur is shown to hate cats and he is furious as he believes they are evil, which jeopardizes his and Francine's friendship, especially when Nemo and Pal become play-pals (with Arthur thinking Nemo is really attacking Pal).
64a	14a	"Mom and Dad Have a Great Big Fight"	Joe Fallon	Robert Yap	December 31, 1998	63A
Mr. and Mrs. Read are frantically making preparations for a planned dinner, but when they have an accident with a pitcher of milk and a bowl of batter, D.W. and Arthur overhear them arguing and fear that the incident will split their family for good, fantasizing about what would happen if they were not in love anymore.
64b	14b	"D.W.'s Perfect Wish"	Joe Fallon	Stéfanie Gignac	December 31, 1998	64A
D.W. is unimpressed about her fifth birthday when she is told by Emily that her childhood is over. Arthur goes over events from previous episodes with D.W. to cheer her up and make her excited about her future. During her party, she cannot figure out what to wish for until she gets advice from Grandma Thora, so D.W. secretly wishes for Arthur to have an accident with her cake, which he does.
65a	15a	"Arthur and D.W. Clean Up"	Anne-Marie Perrotta & Tean Schultz	Robert Yap & Jeremy O'Neill	January 1, 1999	64B
Arthur and D.W. need to clean their rooms and work together to get things done quicker. However, both are fussy about what stays and what goes and how it all goes together.
65b	15b	"The Long, Dull Winter"	Joe Fallon	Jeremy O'Neill	January 1, 1999	62A
Arthur and his friends are feeling different, but can not put a finger on it. They eventually realize that they have not had a holiday in a while, so they attempt to make a new one, but when the others are overcome by the commercial side of holidays, Arthur has to make them realize that holidays mean more than TV specials, candy, or fireworks.

== Reception ==
Going into the premiere of this season, Arthur was ranked as the #1 kids program on PBS, and the #1 program on TV for kids ages 5 – 12.
