= Dan Brown (blogger) =

American vlogger and entertainer (born 1990)

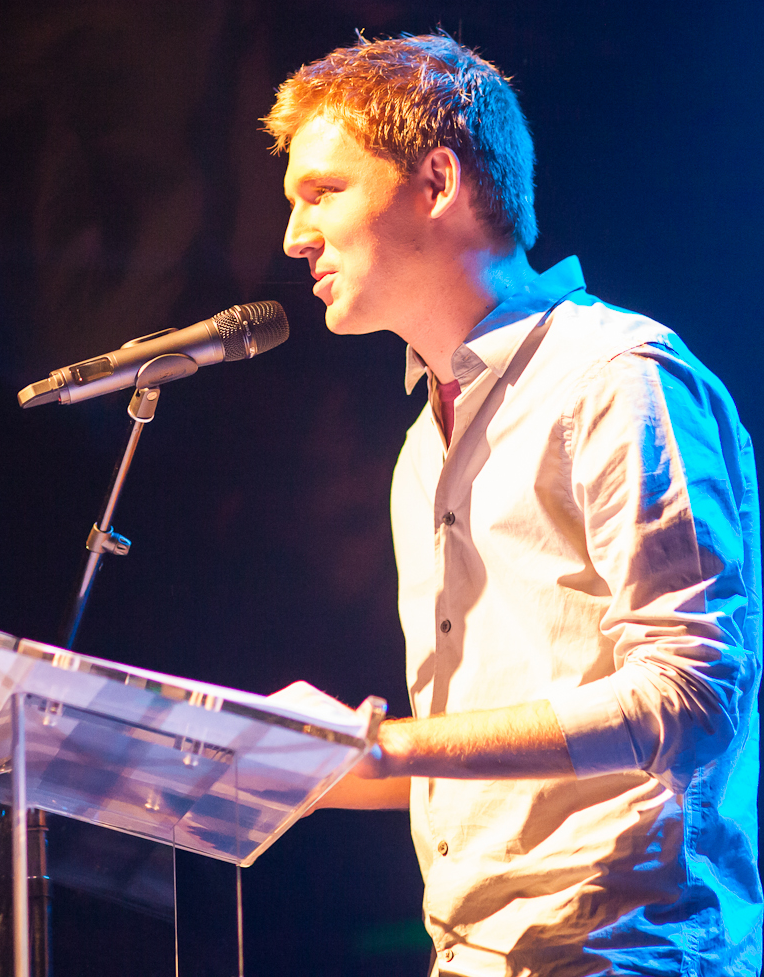
- Brown speaking at the 3rd Annual FlashFWD Ceremony in May 2012
- Born: Daniel Scott Zahller Brown; May 15, 1990 (age 36); Ohio, U.S.
- Education: Chatham University (BA)
- Years active: 2005–2020, 2024, 2025-present
- Employer: Discovery Digital Networks
- Known for: Comedy, politics, discussions
- Notable work: How to solve the Rubik's Cube; DAN3.0; Delicious Steak

YouTube information
- Channel: Dan Brown
- Years active: 2006–2020, 2024, 2025-present
- Subscribers: 255 thousand
- Views: 68.6 million
- Last updated: June 19, 2026

Daniel Scott Zahller Brown (born May 15, 1990) is an American blogger and discussion host, under the YouTube alias Pogobat. Brown has been noted in the media for his newly and widely viewed videos, focusing mainly on how-to videos as well as current events discussion and comedy. Brown is also the founder of the Pogopalooza - the annual world championship of the sport of stunt pogo - which he founded at the age of 14.

On August 2, 2010, Dan launched a project entitled "Dan 3.0," in which viewers would suggest tasks for him to complete, and therefore the viewer would run his life. On April 1, 2011, Dan quit the project for personal reasons, and moved on to the vlog/news show "Delicious Steak". On May 6, 2012, Dan released a video called "The Last Episode Of Delicious Steak", in which he explained that he is no longer committed to a "show", but rather making videos as a hobby.

Beginning in May 2012, he reinvented his video style to heavily focus on current affairs and political or moral debates, utilizing his viewership to provoke and take part in discussions, including topics such as gun law, healthcare, drug legislation, same-sex marriage, and online media. The reaction to this change has been positive.

Since 2016, Dan has been sporadically active on Pogobat, instead focusing on education and other personal matters. He issued a statement to his channel in 2020, stating that he no longer finds joy in video blogging, and wants to keep a distance from social media for mental health purposes. However, he has since stated in a video uploaded in June of 2024 that he enjoys occasionally making videos and is open to posting more in the future, but likely not at the pace he once did.

== Fuse ==
Brown was employed by Fuse, as an interviewer and media personality, appearing regularly on the show Trending 10.

== Personal life ==
Dan grew up in a Christian household. His mother, Rebecca Zahller Brown, is a pastor with the East Lincoln Christian Church. He has two brothers, one older and one younger. He was born in Ohio, lived in Lincoln, Nebraska, during his childhood, and graduated from Lincoln East High School. He briefly attended the University of Nebraska–Lincoln but dropped out to primarily focus on his YouTube career, which took off after a tutorial video on how to solve a Rubik's Cube went viral. He then moved to San Francisco for Dan 3.0, then New York City for his job at Fuse. He currently lives in Pittsburgh where he has been running a Magic: The Gathering commander league for a little bit over a year at a store named Mimic's Market in Bloomfield as of November 2024.

== Other work ==
On January 21, 2010, he appeared on the US version of Who Wants To Be A Millionaire as a contestant and ended up winning $5,000 after incorrectly answering his $10,000 question. In 2013, Dan appeared in a documentary called Please Subscribe: A Documentary About YouTubers, which featured Dan and many other YouTubers. The film was directed by Dan Dobi and the film premiered for one night only on February 5, 2013. The film is now available on iTunes and Netflix.
