= Dmitry Arsenyev =

Russian athlete

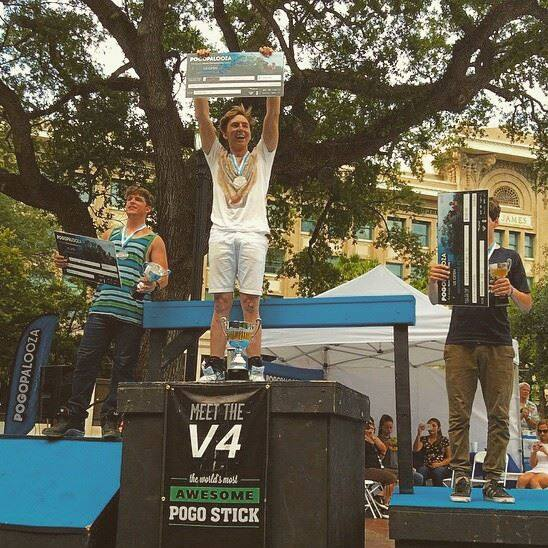
Dmitry Arsenyev got 1st place in Freestyle in Pogopalooza US Open Jacksonville, FL

Dmitry Arsenyev is an Xpogo pro athlete born and raised in St. Petersburg, Russia. Dmitry holds the World Records for Most Consecutive Front Flips (7) and High Jump (10 ft 0.5 in). He also won first place at the 2015 Pogopalooza U.S. Open Freestyle championship. Previously he has held the record for most consecutive backflips and won the Pogopalooza France Best Trick Competition with the Vodka Flip.

Currently he shows his skills in the Show JUMP! by Karl Magee at Phantasialand.
