= Arthur season 2 =

Season of television series

Arthur
- Season 2
- European DVD cover featuring the first ten half-hour episodes; labeled as "The Complete Series 2"
- No. of episodes: 20 (40 segments)

Release
- Original network: PBS
- Original release: October 20, 1997 – April 17, 1998

Season chronology
- ← Previous; Season 1 Next → Season 3

The second season of the television series Arthur was originally broadcast on PBS in the United States from October 20, 1997, to April 17, 1998, and contains 20 episodes. This season, like seasons 1 and 3, was released on DVD in Europe only; because this was actually two production seasons (the first ten episodes encompassing the first and the last ten encompassing the second) combined into one long season for US airings, the first ten episodes for this season can be found on the "Series 2" DVD and the last ten can be found on "Series 3."

Funding for Arthur's second season was provided by the Corporation for Public Broadcasting, PBS viewers, the National Endowment for Children's Educational Television, the Arthur Vining Davis Foundations, and corporate sponsors Juicy Juice, Polaroid Corporation, and GAP.

== Production ==
In September 2021 episode of Jason Szwimer's podcast Finding D.W., Daniel Brochu (Buster Baxter's voice actor) revealed that the inspiration for "Arthur's Faraway Friend" originated when he decided to take a sabbatical to Australia. As the producers did not want to replace him, it was written into the show that Buster would be traveling with his father, much like Brochu himself.

== Episodes ==
No. overall	No. in season	Title	Written by	Storyboard by	Original release date	Prod. code
31a	1a	"Arthur Meets Mister Rogers"	Ken Scarborough	Denis Banville	October 20, 1997	39B
Fred McFeely Rogers (a.k.a. Mister Rogers) stays at Arthur's house while visiting Elwood City. Arthur is embarrassed to tell anyone that because his friends think that his TV show is just for "babies". His avoiding actions cause Prunella, Rubella, and the Brain to jump to the inaccurate conclusion that zombies are the reason for his behavior. They try to find out what is happening, and get the police called on them by Mrs. Tibble, who mistakes them for robbers. The next day, Mister Rogers visits Lakewood Elementary School and Arthur works up the courage to explain to his friends why he has been acting weird.
31b	1b	"Draw!"	Joe Fallon	Eric Bergeron & Gerry Capelle	October 20, 1997	34A
When Francine makes fun of Fern for liking Mr. Ratburn's puppet shows, Fern retaliates by drawing a comic that makes fun of Francine. The comic becomes really popular, and soon the whole class is drawing their own embarrassing cartoons about her. But as the teasing gets worse and worse, the kids don't realize how much they're hurting Francine. Then, they overhear Francine telling Mrs. MacGrady that she just wants the teasing to stop. That's when they realize they've taken things too far and decide to apologize.
32a	2a	"Binky Barnes, Art Expert"	Joe Fallon	Harry Rasmussen	October 21, 1997	34B
Arthur and Buster have to work with Binky on an art report, but they are worried when Binky claims that a certain abstract picture in the museum is framed the wrong direction. They try to distract Binky and finish the assignment on their own, and are surprised when it turns out that Binky is right.
32b	2b	"Arthur's Lucky Pencil"	Peter K. Hirsch	Stéfanie Gignac	October 21, 1997	31A
After several days of bad luck, Arthur feels he is "cursed" until he finds a pencil on the sidewalk. Suddenly, his pencil starts to change his luck: it buys him free soda and better school lunches, and soon his friends all want to use it. With the pencil draining, Arthur hides it to keep his luck safe, but soon cannot remember where it went.
33a	3a	"D.W., the Picky Eater"	Anne-Marie Perrotta	Denis Banville	October 22, 1997	33B
After D.W. throws a tantrum at a restaurant because she has to eat a spinach salad for dinner, she is banned from going to restaurants until she learns to control her behavior and is willing to try new foods. Arthur is determined to help D.W. expand her palate before Grandma Thora’s upcoming birthday dinner at a popular fairytale restaurant. If D.W. doesn’t improve her eating habits, the celebration will have to be moved to the Reads’ house instead.
33b	3b	"Buster and the Daredevils"	Peter K. Hirsch	Grace Lam	October 22, 1997	37A
Arthur and Buster want to hang out with two daredevils, Toby and Slink, and Buster does their embarrassing "dares" while seeking their approval. Arthur discovers that Toby and Slink are tricking Buster, and makes him realize that they are making a fool out of him for their own amusement.
34a	4a	"Arthur Makes a Movie"	Peter K. Hirsch	Robert Yap	October 23, 1997	38A
Arthur and his friends are too young to watch a James Hound movie because it is rated PG-13, so they film their own. While the filming goes wrong, they end up enjoying their outtakes.
34b	4b	"Go to Your Room, D.W."	Kathy Waugh	Alex Szewczuk	October 23, 1997	32B
D.W. is impatient when she is sentenced to a ten-minute timeout in her room after being mean to Kate. She thinks back to her past behavior, and with Nadine's help, she discovers how badly she acted toward her little sister.
35a	5a	"Arthur's Underwear"	Peter K. Hirsch	Jean Lajeunesse	October 24, 1997	33A
When Binky accidentally splits his pants in class, Arthur believes it is funny, until he starts having nightmares about losing his pants. Buster tries to help Arthur with various ways to end his nightmares, but none of them work. When Arthur accidentally rips his pants in the cafeteria at school, Binky and Mrs. MacGrady give him advice on how to live with the brief embarrassment, putting an end to Arthur's nightmares. However, Buster starts having nightmares about losing his pants too.
35b	5b	"Francine Frensky, Olympic Rider"	Kathy Waugh	Denis Banville	October 24, 1997	37B
Francine attends horse riding lessons, and her older sister, Catherine Frensky, has to take her there. Catherine decides to take lessons too and quickly becomes better than Francine, as well as getting a crush on Stanley, the riding instructor. Francine gets jealous and considers quitting her lessons.
36a	6a	"Buster Baxter, Cat Saver"	Joe Fallon	Denis Banville	October 27, 1997	35B
After Buster gets a cat down from the tree when it smells his Rocky Trout ice cream cone, he is considered a hero until it goes to his head. Meanwhile, Arthur is being constantly annoyed by D.W. and her new "Crazy Bus" CD.
36b	6b	"Play it Again, D.W."	Joe Fallon	Harry Rasmussen	October 27, 1997	38B
D.W. is still playing her "Crazy Bus" CD a thousand times (from "Buster Baxter, Cat Saver") and Arthur is furious by it, even threatening that he will break it to pieces. When the CD goes missing, an enraged D.W. blames Arthur for taking it, with no one believing his rejections. Luckily, while Mr. and Mrs. Read attend their high school reunion, Mrs. Read said that Mr. Read accidentally took the CD.
37a	7a	"Arthur's TV-Free Week"	Peter K. Hirsch	Stéfanie Gignac	October 28, 1997	32A
Arthur and his friends sign a petition at school to survive one week without television. Everyone tries to resist the temptation of TV while they go through their week, with Arthur and Buster struggling in particular.
37b	7b	"Night Fright"	Joe Fallon	Gerry Capelle	October 28, 1997	31B
Binky has a night light and tries to go without it when Arthur sleeps over. Binky goes through another nightmare, and Arthur finds out about it. He thinks that Arthur will tell everyone his secret, though Arthur is not particularly interested. Even so, Binky tries to pamper Arthur to keep his secret until Binky finally chooses to confess it to avoid Arthur possibly telling everyone.
38a	8a	"Arthur vs. the Piano"	Joe Fallon	Harry Rasmussen	October 29, 1997	36B
Arthur's music class has an upcoming recital and everyone except for an anxious Arthur, is practicing. Arthur is confident that he knows everything well enough, until a nightmare makes him worry that he may miss a note, and he tries to restore his confidence. Meanwhile, D.W. has endless hiccups, despite numerous attempted remedies.
38b	8b	"The Big Blow-Up"	Joe Fallon	Alex Hawley	October 29, 1997	36A
Francine and the Brain war over a play during soccer practice that carries into school and through the next several soccer matches. Arthur and Buster decide to resolve things between Francine and the Brain with fake apology letters before the last game of the season that determines if they will make the playoffs or not.
39a	9a	"Lost!"	Kathy Waugh	Gerry Capelle	October 30, 1997	40A
Arthur has to take a city bus to the Elwood City Indoor Pool for his swimming lesson, but while reading a book, he falls asleep on the bus, only to miss his stop. Ending up at the edge of town, Arthur tries to find his way home, while D.W. becomes truly scared for Arthur's safety. Arthur stops at a nearby diner for help, where he talks to a friendly bus driver named Sam, who takes him back home.
39b	9b	"The Short, Quick Summer"	Joe Fallon	Denis Banville	October 30, 1997	40B
Arthur loses his to-do list he planned for the summer and another new school year is quickly approaching. As summer ends, he feels upset that his friends did fun things and he didn't. On the last day of summer vacation, Arthur finds his list taped to his bedroom door and realizes that he did everything he wanted to.
40a	10a	"D.W. Goes to Washington"	Joe Fallon	Gerry Capelle	October 31, 1997	39A
The Reads visit Washington, D.C. for their holiday weekend. They tour the popular landmarks, including the White House, but D.W., who wishes to go to "Pony Land", abruptly separates from the tour group and meets the President.
40b	10b	"Arthur's Mystery Envelope"	Sheilarae Carpentier Lau	Gary Scott & Nelson Dewey	October 31, 1997	35A
Mr. Haney gives an envelope to Arthur to give to Mrs. Read. Arthur is worried about the contents of the envelope, thinking that he might go to summer school (if he failed Mr. Ratburn's big history test, Binky thought), so he tries to hide it from her. D.W. insists on showing the envelope, so she can see how much Arthur is going to get into trouble. When Arthur finally reveals the envelope, it turns out to be Mr. Haney's tax documents, as Mrs. Read is his accountant.
41a	11a	"D.W.'s Deer Friend"	Joe Fallon	Robert Yap	April 6, 1998	44B
The Reads spend the weekend camping and D.W. befriends a deer, whom she names him Walter. Willing to take him home, Mr. and Mrs. Read teach D.W. a lesson that taking away an animal from its habitat is forbidden and against the law.
41b	11b	"Buster Hits the Books"	Joe Fallon	Jeremy O'Neill & Ivan Tankushev	April 6, 1998	50B
Buster needs to write a book report, but has never managed to finish a book. His friends try to find one that is easy for him to read, but Buster can't pay attention long enough to read one in its entirety, until he finds one that interests him: Robin Hood.
42a	12a	"Arthur's Faraway Friend"	Joe Fallon	Brian Anderson	April 7, 1998	43A
Arthur and Buster finish reading Robin Hood (from "Buster Hits the Books"), and decide to write their own continuation of the book, but it gets sidetracked when Buster tells him that he is leaving for a couple of months with his father, who is a pilot. Arthur tries to find a way for Buster to stay, until Sue Ellen points out how it will be hard for him to go away. Arthur has to become supportive to Buster until he leaves, and both are upset. Buster soon sends Arthur a surprise gift in the mail: chapters of their book based on his travels.
42b	12b	"Arthur and the Square Dance"	Peter K. Hirsch	Gerry Capelle	April 7, 1998	41A
Arthur and Francine are made partners for Mrs. MacGrady's square dancing class. Binky thinks that Francine is in love with Arthur and starts a rumor about it. The two avoid each other because they are afraid of getting cooties.
43a	13a	"Water and the Brain"	Peter K. Hirsch	Robert Yap	April 8, 1998	42B
Muffy is throwing a party at a water park, and everyone is invited, except the Brain. Arthur and Binky discover that the Brain is afraid of water and try to help him get over this fear so he can go to Muffy's party.
43b	13b	"Arthur the Unfunny"	Joe Fallon	Stéfanie Gignac	April 8, 1998	41B
In a letter to a far-away Buster, Arthur tells him that he is struggling with being funny when his friends act as clowns for a carnival. Arthur cannot learn any clown tricks, and his friends fear that he will ruin the carnival. Arthur learns that he has his own style of being funny that works: playing the piano while making faces with Kate.
44a	14a	"Sue Ellen's Lost Diary"	Peter K. Hirsch	Ivan Tankushev	April 9, 1998	45B
Sue Ellen loses her diary in the library, so Muffy, Francine, Binky, and Arthur team up to find it, and think that it contains her opinions on them and whether to open it or return it unread.
44b	14b	"Arthur's Knee"	Sheilarae Carpentier Lau	Marisol Gagnon & M. Cuadrado	April 9, 1998	44A
Arthur sneakily goes into the Elwood City dump to retrieve a wheel for his school project, but accidentally cuts his knee on a sharp can lid. He hides the injury and makes D.W. promise not to tell anyone because it is prohibited to trespass into the dump. D.W., with the Brain’s help, tries to persuade him, that he has to confess to Mr. and Mrs. Read before his wound gets more infected.
45a	15a	"Grandma Thora Appreciation Day"	Kathy Waugh	Angus Bungay	April 10, 1998	42A
Arthur and D.W. feel sorry for Grandma Thora because she does not have cable TV, cannot eat any good snacks, and has to keep her dentures in a glass. They plan a surprise party for her, but struggle to make things work and do not want any help planning the party.
45b	15b	"Fern's Slumber Party"	Sandra Willard	Nelson Dewey	April 10, 1998	43B
Fern's mother, Mrs. Walters, wants her to host her own slumber party to help her expand her social skills, but Fern is very reluctant. Her guests, Francine, Muffy, Jenna Morgan, Sue Ellen, and Prunella, get bored quickly, and the party is a fiasco. When Francine's bracelet goes missing, Fern uses her detective skills learned from Sherlock Holmes to solve the mystery.
46a	16a	"Love Notes for Muffy"	Sandra Willard	Robert Yap	April 13, 1998	48A
The Brain and Francine use fake love notes to get revenge against Muffy after her science project gets more praise. Their joke has unintended consequences, which means they must fix it before things get worse.
46b	16b	"D.W. Blows the Whistle"	Barry Rinehart & Ian Saunders	Robert Yap	April 13, 1998	50A
When D.W. saves a little boy from getting run over by a car by blowing her whistle, she becomes an overzealous safety control freak. Arthur and his friends try to stop her from ruining the upcoming soapbox race, while D.W. learns the hard way that her obsession with finding everyone else's safety faults causes her to jeopardize her own safety.
47a	17a	"Francine Redecorates"	Sandra Willard	Stéfanie Gignac	April 14, 1998	45A
Francine and Catherine are both fed up of sharing a room with each other. So Catherine moves out to the family living room, leaving Francine alone with their old room. They both struggle with adjusting to their new environments and later decide to compromise with each other as Catherine moves back.
47b	17b	"Arthur the Loser"	Joe Fallon	Brian Anderson	April 14, 1998	48B
Arthur has a losing streak when he continues to be dominated in the new No Guessing! board game, so he resorts to cheating to win. His friends are annoyed by his sore-winner attitude and tag along with Binky to make Arthur lose. When Arthur sees everyone rooting against him, he has an imaginary conversation with Buster, who is still away with his father, and makes him see the error of his ways.
48a	18a	"Arthur vs. the Very Mean Crossing Guard"	Ken Scarborough	Gerry Capelle & Marisol Gagnon	April 15, 1998	47A
Arthur and the Brain confront a new crossing guard who charges $10 every time someone crosses the street and threatens to send his "goons" after them. They think of ways to avoid him, until they learn that he is a friend of Grandma Thora's and that he was just teasing them, after overhearing how Arthur constantly teases D.W. the same way.
48b	18b	"D.W.'s Very Bad Mood"	Kathy Waugh	Guy Lamoureux & Robert Yap	April 15, 1998	49A
D.W. has been very aggressive for several days straight. Francine and Arthur spy on D.W. and discover that she is enraged over not being invited to a classmate's birthday party. Francine tries to tell D.W. that she cannot have everything that she wants, but when D.W still struggles to manage her anger, Francine consoles her by inviting D.W. to her birthday party.
49a	19a	"D.W.'s Name Game"	Joe Fallon	Robert Yap	April 16, 1998	46A
Arthur and D.W. make fun of each other with different insulting nicknames. After Arthur calls by her full first name, D.W. has a nightmare and learns that calling people names can hurt them.
49b	19b	"Finders Key-pers"	Chris Moore	Stéfanie Gignac	April 16, 1998	49B
Arthur, Binky, and the Brain find a key in the grass while looking for their lost baseball. Arthur theorizes that it is the key to the city, Binky hopes it belongs to a sports car, and the Brain thinks that it opens an upcoming science museum. They fight over who gets to keep the key, despite none of them knowing what it unlocks. It is later revealed to open the sprinkler control system for the school's baseball field.
50a	20a	"How the Cookie Crumbles"	Joe Fallon	Brian Anderson	April 17, 1998	46B
Muffy is having difficulty coming up with a recipe for a strawberry-themed contest. Arthur's friends suggest a cookie recipe, which turns out to taste delicious, and she takes all of the credit, much to her friends' anger and disgust. Muffy learns the hard way about taking credit for someone else's work when she tries to bake the cookies herself, but cannot remember the recipe.
50b	20b	"Sue Ellen's Little Sister"	Peter K. Hirsch	Stéfanie Gignac	April 17, 1998	47B
Sue Ellen feels left out without a brother or sister, so she tries to pretend having her friends as siblings, but they each have their own flaws. During a playdate with D.W., Sue Ellen learns about the dangers of having a younger sibling and gets bullied by D.W. Soon after, Sue Ellen gets a letter from a boy named Tenzin living in Tibet, who becomes her new pen pal.
