= Pogo stick =

Spring-aided device for jumping off the ground in a standing position

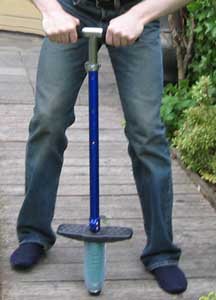
An adult holding a pogo stick

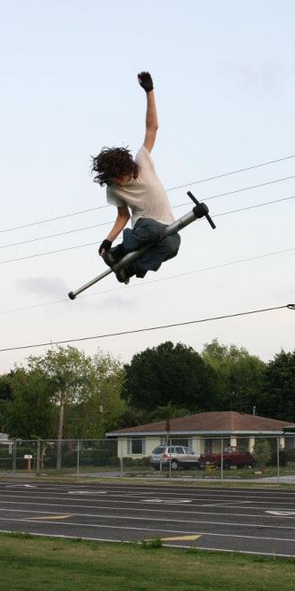
A high-performance pogo stick as used in "Xpogo"

A pogo stick is a device for jumping off the ground in a standing position—through the aid of a spring, or new high performance technologies—often used as a toy, exercise equipment or extreme sports instrument. It led to an extreme sport named extreme pogo or "Xpogo".

It consists of a pole with a handle at the top and footrests near the bottom, and a spring located somewhere along the pole. The spring joins two sections of the pole, which extends below the footpads.

The jumper places their feet on the footpads while balancing on the pole, then jumps up or down with a bending action of the knees to add or subtract energy in the spring. When the spring is at full compression or extension, the jumper is lifted by the recoil of the spring, being launched several inches or feet into the air. This process is repeated to maintain a periodic bounce.

The pogo stick can be steered by shifting one's weight off the centerline of the spring in the desired horizontal direction thus producing horizontal locomotion.

== Inventors ==
A spring stilt utilizing compression springs on each foot was patented in 1881 by George H. Herrington of Wichita, Kansas, "for leaping great distances and heights". This was an antecedent of the pogo stick as well as today's spring stilts.

The modern eponymously named pogo stick was invented by Max Pohlig and Ernst Gottschall, from Germany. A German patent was registered in Hanover in March 1920 for a device they called a "spring end hopping stilt". It is thought that the beginning two letters in these men's last names is where the word "pogo" comes from.

The two-handle pogo stick design was patented by George B. Hansburg in 1957. Hansburg described the origins of the Pogo name colloquially in a story of a young Burmese girl with the aforementioned name whose father had created a crude version of the device so that the daughter could travel to the local temple for prayers. An earlier design with a single upright vertical handle patented in 1955 posed something of a risk to the user's chin. Later improvements to the pogo stick have been made, including the Vurtego, Flybar, and the BowGo, which allow operators to jump much higher than with a simple coil spring pogo stick. Back flips and other tricks are now possible on some of these newer sticks, which has contributed to the growth of the new sport of Extreme Pogo ("Xpogo").

Whatever improvements or different types are made, the basic design idea of a person riding on a spring remains the same.

Patent Drawings

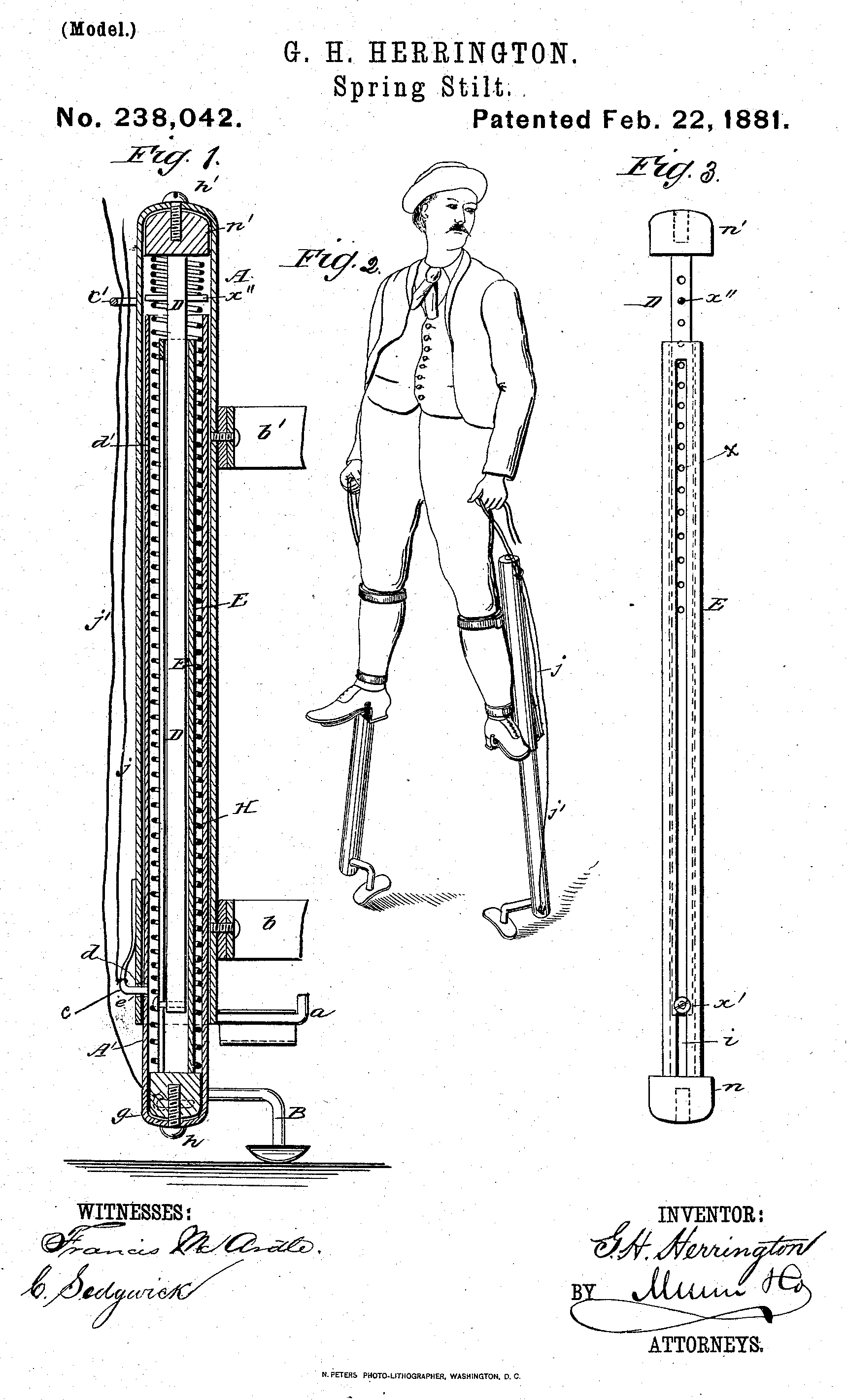
US238042, granted 1881

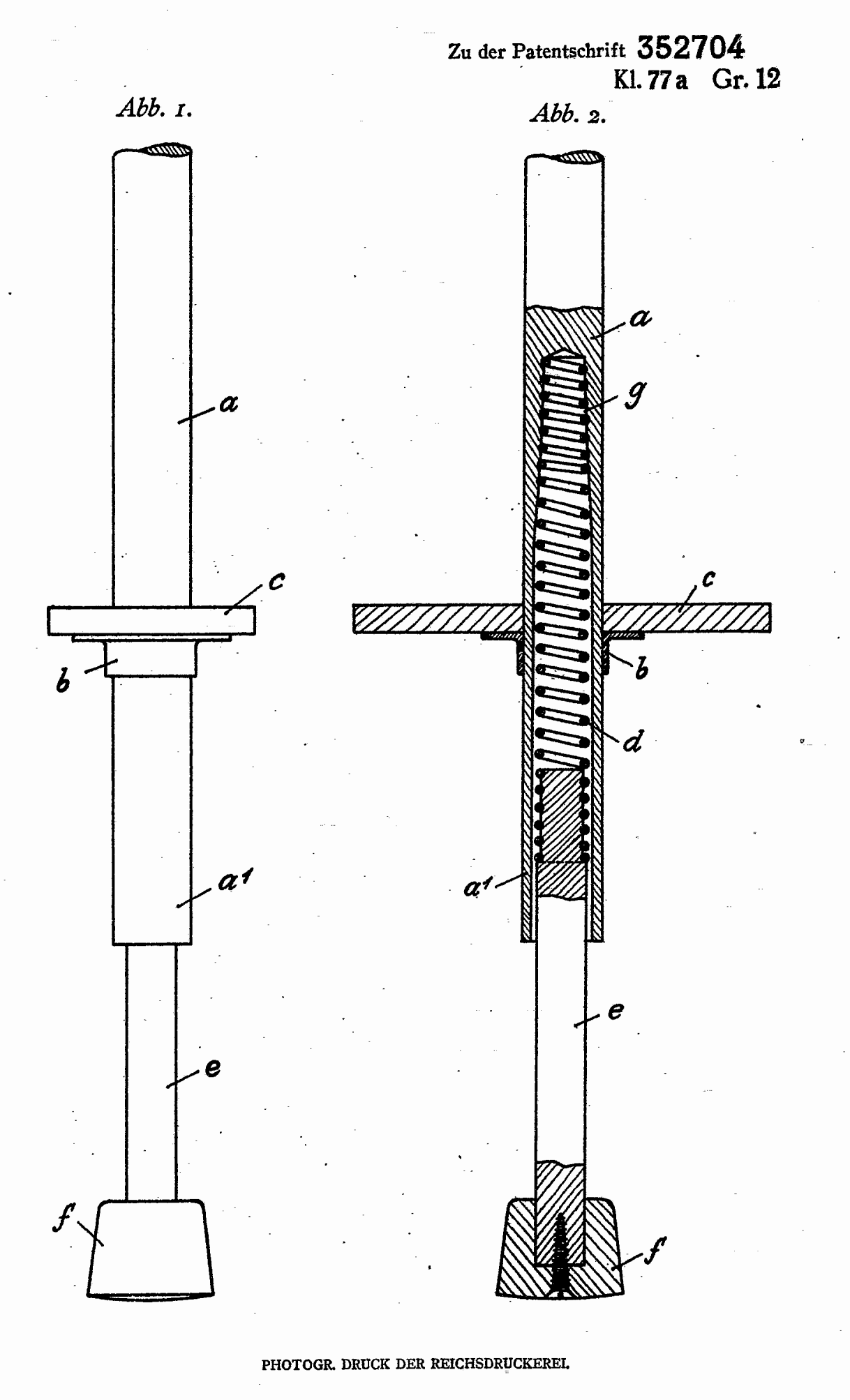
DE352704A, granted 1920

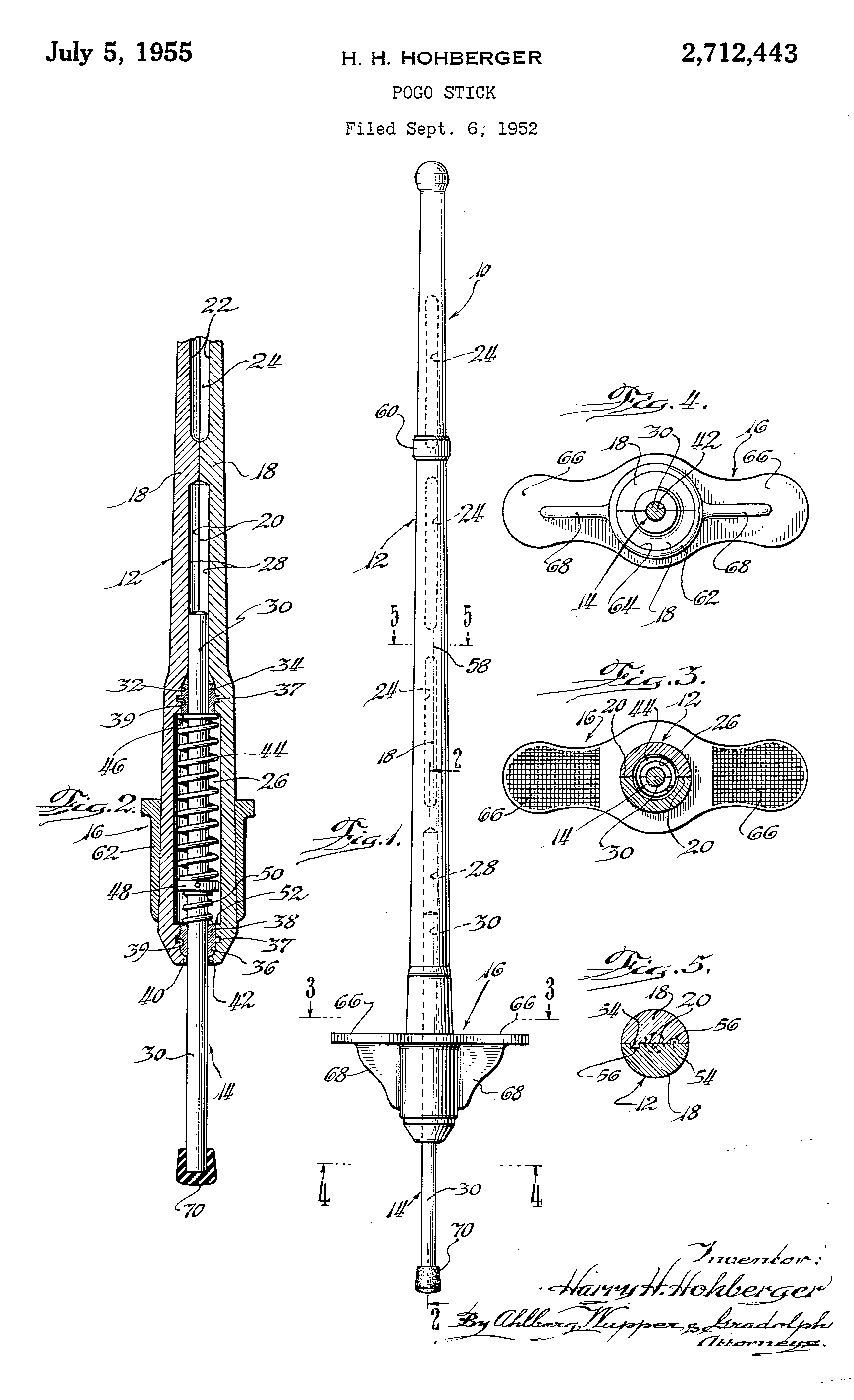
US2712443, filled 1952

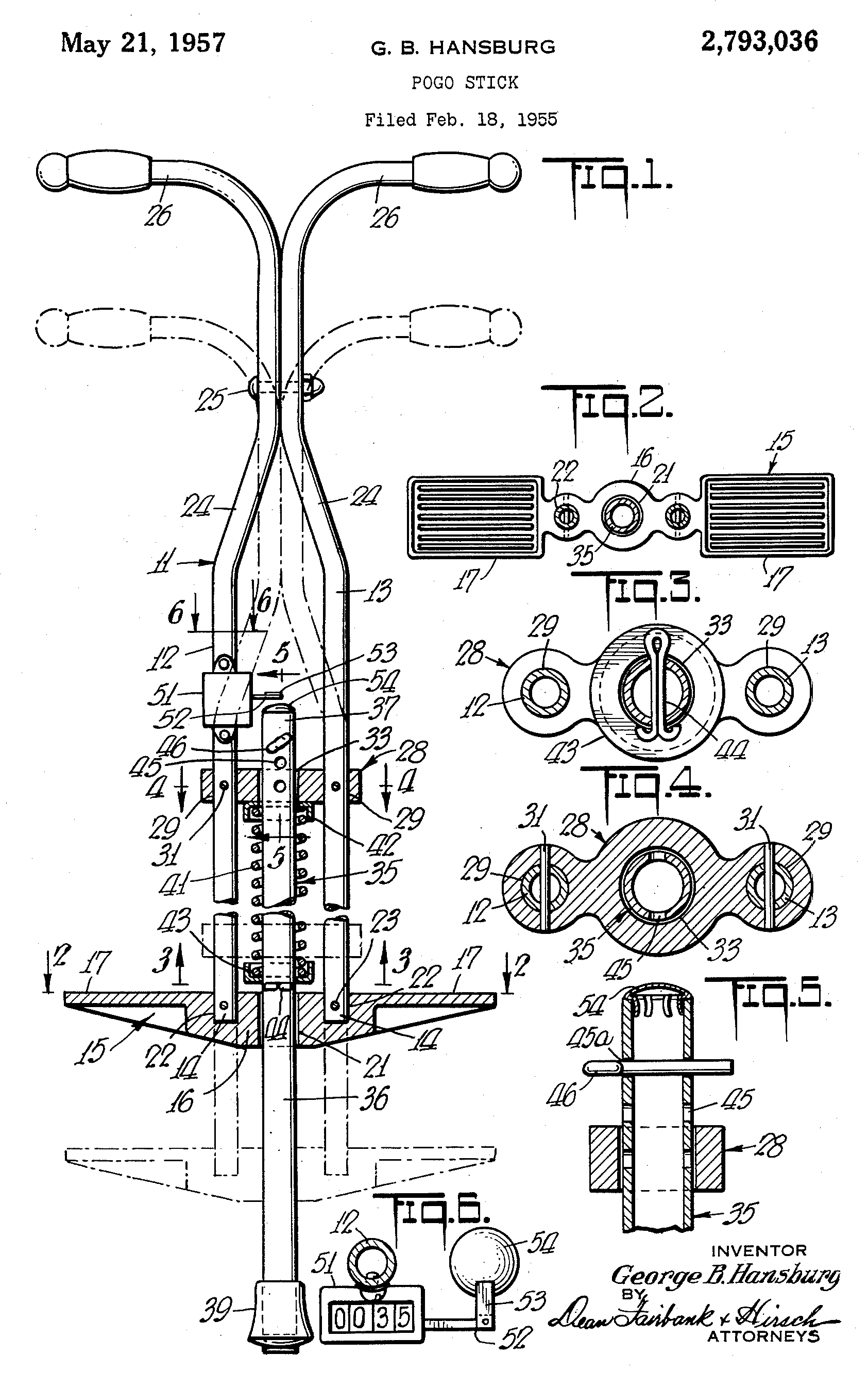
US2793036, filled 1955

== Popularity and records ==
There have been shows performed with pogo sticks, marriages performed on them, jumping contests held, and world records set and reset numerous times. The record for continuous pogoing currently stands at 20 hours and 13 minutes with 206,864 bounces, set by James Roumeliotis.

In 2012, the pogo stick was gaining in popularity through the invention of extreme pogo sticks and the emerging sport of Xpogo.

== Xpogo ==
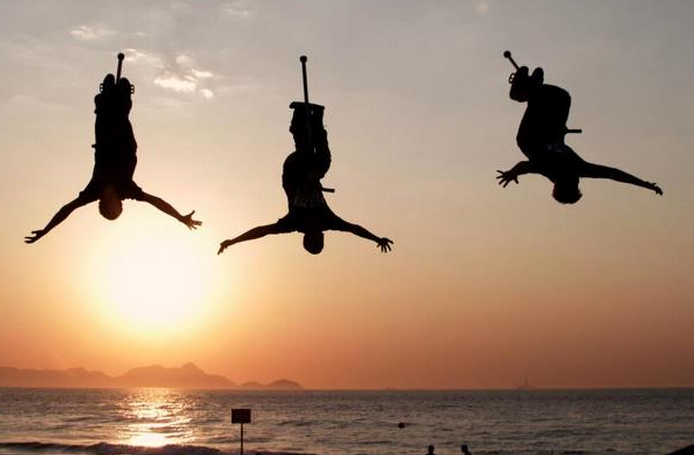
No-Handed Backflips on extreme pogo sticks in Rio de Janeiro, Brazil

Animation of how a pogo stick moves

Extreme Pogo, or Xpogo, is an action sport which involves riding and performing tricks on extreme pogo sticks, defined as such by their durability and potential for height. Today's Xpogo sticks have the potential for over 10 ft (3 m) of height (measured from the ground to the bottom of the tip). Extreme pogo is a relatively new extreme sport and is currently emerging into popular culture as evidenced by the growing number of Xpogo athletes around the globe, growing sales from extreme pogo companies, the popularity of Xpogo athlete exhibition teams, positive feedback and continued interest in Xpogo content on sites such as YouTube, and the expanding scope of the annual World Championships of Xpogo, Pogopalooza.

== See also ==
- Pogo (dance)
- Pogo oscillation, a dangerous oscillation produced by rocket engines
- Pogo pin, a spring loaded electrical contact
- Powerbocking
- Space hopper, another kind of bouncing toy
