= Arthur season 1 =

Arthur
- Season 1
- UK DVD cover
- No. of episodes: 30 (60 segments)

Release
- Original network: PBS
- Original release: October 7 – November 15, 1996

Season chronology
- Next → Season 2

The first season of the television series Arthur was originally broadcast on PBS in the United States from October 7 to November 15, 1996, and contains 30 episodes with each episode containing two 11-minute segments, making it the longest season of the show.

== Production ==
According to an October 14, 1997 New York Daily News article, each episode this season reportedly cost around $400,000 to make (or $12 million for the entire season).

Funding for Arthur's first season was provided by the Corporation for Public Broadcasting, PBS viewers, the National Endowment for Children's Educational Television, the Arthur Vining Davis Foundations, and corporate sponsor Libby's Juicy Juice.

== Episodes ==
No. overall	No. in season	Title	Written by	Storyboard by	Original release date	Prod. code
1a	1a	"Arthur's Eyes"	Joe Fallon	Gerry Capelle	October 7, 1996	1A
In the middle of the night, 8-year-old aardvark Arthur Read and his 4-year-old sister, Dora Winifred "D.W." Read, peek into a photo album and see pictures of a younger Arthur without glasses. Not recognizing Arthur without them, D.W. thinks that she and Arthur had another brother at one point. Arthur, however, clears this up by telling her that he got them during the second grade (when D.W. was two years old) and why he started wearing glasses. In a flashback, Arthur is shown having trouble with his eyesight, so he later gets glasses. When Arthur's schoolmates begin calling him "four eyes" for wearing the glasses, he finds ways to avoid wearing them, with disastrous results. But after discovering that Wilbur Rabbit, the actor who plays his favorite hero, Bionic Bunny, wears glasses like him, Arthur becomes more confident about his own glasses, and the teasing soon stops.
1b	1b	"Francine's Bad Hair Day"	Kathy Waugh	Jean Sarô	October 7, 1996	2A
With school picture day coming up, Mary "Muffy" Crosswire decides to make her best friend, Francine Frensky, beautiful by giving her a dress and taking her to a beauty salon for a new hairstyle. Francine is mortified with her new hairstyle, getting teased at school for it, and is disallowed by Muffy to play in a kickball game to ensure she looks nice for her school pictures. Eventually, having enough, Francine participates in the kickball game and wins for her team, getting incredibly dirty afterward. Despite still being filthy when taking her school photo, Francine likes it and even trades photos with Arthur, much to Muffy's chagrin.
2a	2a	"Arthur and the Real Mr. Ratburn" "Arthur's Teacher Trouble"	Joe Fallon	John Pagan & Norm Roen	October 8, 1996	3B
It's a new school year at Lakewood Elementary School, and Mr. Haney, the principal, assigns every student their new classroom instructor. Arthur and his friends are horrified when they learn that their third-grade teacher will be the infamous Mr. Nigel Ratburn, who is rumored to be the toughest teacher in the entire school. Worse, one of the students, Prunella Deegan, tells the gang false facts about Mr. Ratburn, such as that he eats nails for breakfast (without milk) and sends children to death row if they get an answer wrong, making the kids even more afraid of Mr. Ratburn. After overhearing Mr. Ratburn ordering "boy's heads," Arthur and Buster think their teacher is trying to harm them, so they spy on him (along with Francine) to see if he does anything out of the ordinary. It eventually turns out that Mr. Ratburn is actually performing a puppet show, with the boy's head being the head of the puppet. Arthur and Buster are relieved that Mr. Ratburn has a soft side, but they are still concerned about his strict teaching and heavy homework loads.
2b	2b	"Arthur's Spelling Trubble"	Joe Fallon	Jean Lajeunesse	October 8, 1996	6B
Mr. Ratburn announces that Lakewood Elementary School is having a spelling bee, and all the students have their own strategies to prepare for it, except for Arthur, who only practices one word (aardvark) from a rap song. Fortunately for Arthur, "aardvark" happens to be the word that Mr. Ratburn asks him to spell, which he does correctly, being the only classmate, other than Alan "The Brain" Powers, to pass and advance to the school's Spellathon. In order to do better, Arthur does a lot more studying to improve his spelling, missing out on fun activities with his friends. On the day of the Spellathon, the Brain is eliminated from the competition after spelling the word "fear" incorrectly. Prunella, who won the Spellathon last year, is also eliminated after spelling "preparation" incorrectly. Arthur, however, manages to spell the aforementioned word correctly and win the Spellathon.
3a	3a	"D.W. All Wet"	Kathy Waugh	Sylvain Proteau	October 9, 1996	7B
D.W. develops a fear of octopuses while on a field trip to the aquarium with her class. At home, to tease D.W. for her fear, Arthur plays a cruel prank on her during her bath time and is subsequently sent to his room. The next day, the Reads and Arthur's best friend, Buster Baxter, go to the lakeshore, but D.W., assuming that there might be octopuses in the lake, is too scared to swim, and Arthur and Buster are forced to play with her on the sand, much to their embarrassment. However, after Arthur teases her by pretending to be under attack by an octopus, D.W. overcomes her fear and learns from the beach's lifeguard that octopuses are never found in lakes. At the end of the day, Mrs. Read promises that they will go back to the beach soon.
3b	3b	"Buster's Dino Dilemma"	Matt Steinglass	Raymond Lebrun	October 9, 1996	17B
On a class trip to a state park, Buster, with Arthur's help, finds a fossilized dinosaur footprint, but the former is dismayed at the rule that all fossils should be given to the museum and not be kept for the one who found it, so he hides the fossil to keep it, to Arthur's dismay. While trying to keep the fossil a secret from everyone, Buster realizes that the guilt of stealing is ruining his life and decides to give it to the museum. The museum curator suggests that the dinosaur that made the footprint may have been a baby Daspletosaurus or an adult Coelosaurus, and Buster and Arthur are given credit for finding it.
4a	4a	"D.W.'s Imaginary Friend"	Ken Scarborough	Sylvain Proteau	October 10, 1996	1B
Arthur is irritated when D.W. creates a new imaginary friend named Nadine. When the Reads and Buster take a trip to Wonder World, where a new ride called the "Hurl-a-Whirl" has opened, D.W. plans to take Nadine to the park, worrying Arthur and Buster, fearing that D.W. will embarrass them. They try to find ways to prevent D.W. from coming, but fail completely. While at the park, Arthur tries to ignore D.W. and Nadine, but D.W. says that Nadine wants to give him extra tickets for rides because she wants to be his friend, touching him and accepting her imaginary friend.
4b	4b	"Arthur's Lost Library Book"	Joe Fallon	Jean Lajeunesse	October 10, 1996	22B
Arthur is the first to borrow the new Scare-Your-Pants-Off book, The Mysterious Hand, from the Elwood City Library, but accidentally drops it on his way home. Suspecting his friends of having stolen the book, Arthur recruits Lakewood Elementary's class bully, Binky Barnes, who doesn't seem to enjoy reading, to help interrogate the possible suspects, including Sue Ellen Armstrong, Francine, and Buster. When it turns out that no one has the book, Arthur is forced to pay for the missing book. However, it is discovered that Binky found it, initially unaware of who it belonged to, until it is revealed that nobody else had Arthur's copy. After Arthur discovers that Binky likes reading books after all, the latter warns him not to tell anyone about it, as he is embarrassed to admit it.
5a	5a	"Arthur's Pet Business"	Joe Fallon	Jean Lajeunesse	October 11, 1996	3A
Arthur starts his own pet-sitting business to prove he is responsible enough to get a dog of his own. He ends up getting many more pets to take care of than he bargained for, including his neighbor, Mrs. Wood's unfriendly dog, Perky. When Perky goes missing on the day Mrs. Wood is supposed to pick her up, Arthur fears that he is not a good pet owner after all, but he soon finds that Perky has given birth to a litter of puppies (which indirectly explains why Perky was acting so aggressively). As a reward for taking care of Perky, Arthur is allowed by Mrs. Wood to adopt one of her newborn puppies and pays D.W. the $10 he was given after he had promised to pay her for helping him.
5b	5b	"D.W. the Copycat"	Joe Fallon	Stéfanie Gignac	October 11, 1996	23A
After Arthur wishes D.W. would be more like him, D.W. decides to dress like Arthur, follow him around, and do what he likes. While Arthur likes this at first, he is soon fed up, especially when his friends start excluding him because they do not want D.W. around. After D.W.'s own friends refuse to play with her due to her changed attitude, Arthur allows her to change back to her old self, though D.W. hints that it was all a set-up.
6a	6a	"Locked in the Library!"	Kathy Waugh	John Flagg	October 14, 1996	10A
Francine is mad at Arthur for a joke he made at her expense, which becomes more of a problem when Mr. Ratburn assigns the two to work together on a weekend project. The next day, they go to the library together to do research on their project but lose track of time, getting locked inside during closing time. Realizing that the library will not be open again until Monday, Arthur and Francine try to find ways to escape separately. Arthur eventually becomes aggressively concerned about Francine's safety and tries to save her, which touches Francine when she finds out, and they make up. Later, the Reads and the Frenskys soon come to pick them up, and the duo does a report about acts of heroism at school the next day, impressing Mr. Ratburn.
6b	6b	"Arthur Accused!"	James Greenberg	Jean Sarô	October 14, 1996	9B
Arthur is in charge of assisting Lakewood's cafeteria lady, Mrs. Leah MacGrady, with a fundraiser, but when he tries to give the money he raised to her, she is distracted by a phone conversation, so Arthur leaves the money in the kitchen. However, when the money mysteriously vanishes, Arthur is falsely accused of stealing it, which prevents him from going to a school picnic as his punishment if the missing money is not recovered. Buster, acting as a detective, tries to prove Arthur's innocence before the day of the picnic. When he seemingly fails to find any clues, Buster eventually deduces that Mrs. MacGrady had unknowingly put the quarters into brownie mix by mistake, clearing Arthur's name and allowing him to attend the picnic.
7a	7a	"Arthur Goes to Camp"	Rowby Goren	Sylvain Proteau	October 15, 1996	4A
Arthur and his friends attend a summer sleep-away program at Camp Meadowcroak, where everything is a competition between girls and boys. When Meadowcroak's rival camp, Horsewater, plays a spooky prank on them, Arthur convinces everybody to work together in Meadowcroak's annual scavenger hunt, and they manage to win.
7b	7b	"Buster Makes the Grade"	Peter K. Hirsch	Nadja Cozic	October 15, 1996	18A
Buster falls behind with his schoolwork and is threatened with repeating third grade if he does not improve. Arthur, Muffy, and Francine tutor him, but he struggles to pay attention.
8a	8a	"Arthur's New Puppy"	Joe Fallon	Hana Kukal	October 16, 1996	5A
Following the events of "Arthur's Pet Business," Arthur tries to train his new puppy, Pal, to behave, but Pal ends up making huge messes and causing disturbances around the house.
8b	8b	"Arthur Bounces Back"	Tom Hertz	John Flagg	October 16, 1996	12A
Arthur wants Moon Boots and tries to get money to buy them. While Arthur is cleaning the garage, his neighbor, Mrs. Tibble, comes by and, mistaking it for a yard sale, offers to buy a necklace for the amount of money he needs for his Moon Boots. Arthur regrets this decision when he learns that the necklace is a present for Mrs. Read’s birthday, so he tries to earn it back.
9a	9a	"Arthur Babysits"	Joe Fallon	Gerry Capelle	October 17, 1996	7A
Arthur thinks that babysitting is an easy job until D.W. volunteers him to babysit Mrs. Tibble's identical twin grandsons, Tommy and Timmy Tibble, who have a bad reputation for being destructive. After some initial struggles, Arthur gets the twins to behave by telling them a scary story.
9b	9b	"Arthur's Cousin Catastrophe"	Terence Taylor	Jean Charles Fink	October 17, 1996	16A
The Reads are hosting their annual family reunion. Arthur spends most of the party hiding from his cousin, Mo, who has bullied him during past reunions, while his parents deal with their eccentric relatives. When a thunderstorm forces the Reads to spend the rest of the party indoors, Arthur learns that Mo has been looking for him to ask if he could give her a piano lesson.
10a	10a	"Arthur's Birthday"	Joe Fallon	Stéfanie Gignac	October 18, 1996	11A
Arthur and Muffy have their birthday parties on the same day, and neither party can postpone. While everyone is frozen with indecision over whose party to attend, Arthur and Francine work together to merge the two parties into one everyone can enjoy.
10b	10b	"Francine Frensky, Superstar"	Joe Fallon	Darren Brereton	October 18, 1996	18B
Feeling sorry for Francine getting the challenging roles in all of Lakewood's class plays, the entire class vouches for her to star as Thomas Edison in the next one. However, they regret their decision when Francine tries to take charge and acts very bossy, leading to heated conflicts between her and the whole cast.
11a	11a	"Arthur's Baby"	Joe Fallon	Gerry Capelle	October 21, 1996	19B
On baby Kate Read's first birthday, Arthur and D.W. reminisce on what happened before Kate was born. In a flashback, Arthur tries to prepare for his baby sister's arrival. Once Kate is finally brought home, Arthur becomes convinced that Kate doesn't like him as she cries hysterically whenever he is near her. However, when D.W. is unsure of what to do when Kate won't stop crying, Arthur manages to burp Kate, earning her respect.
11b	11b	"D.W.'s Baby"	Joe Fallon	Gerry Capelle	October 21, 1996	21A
Following the events of the previous episode, D.W. feels jealous of the attention Kate receives from the rest of the family and tries everything to get rid of her, but nothing works. Discouraged, D.W. attempts to run away to a nearby island, but when her Grandma Thora informs her of how much Kate needs her, D.W. changes her mind and agrees to be Kate's role model. Note: This episode takes place at the same time as "Arthur's Baby" and is shown from D.W.'s point of view.
12a	12a	"Arthur Writes a Story"	Joe Fallon	Gerry Capelle	October 22, 1996	8B
When Arthur is assigned to write a story, he writes about how he got Pal. Afraid that people will find it boring, Arthur begins fictionalizing the events using advice from different people. Once he realizes how strange the story is, he changes it back and learns that the truth is still interesting.
12b	12b	"Arthur's Lost Dog"	Joe Fallon	Sylvian Proteau	October 22, 1996	9A
It is Downtown Day in Elwood City, and the Reads are attending a festival. They pass a clown giving out balloons, and Kate is crying because she wants one. Nobody but Pal understands the crying Kate wants a balloon, so Pal runs off to get one for her, but Arthur thinks he is running away from him.
13a	13a	"So Long, Spanky"	Peter K. Hirsch	Jean Lajeunesse	October 23, 1996	14B
When D.W.'s pet bird, Spanky, dies, she leaves a can of flowers on his grave after his funeral but finds a toad in it. The toad constantly follows D.W., but she is annoyed that it will not leave her alone. But when the toad disappears one morning, D.W. realizes she misses it. Once they reunite, D.W. names the toad "Toady."
13b	13b	"Buster's New Friend"	Matt Steinglass	Jean Lajeunesse	October 23, 1996	19A
Arthur and Buster work on a project together, but Buster does not have the time for the project or Arthur, instead talking about his new friend, Mike. When Buster keeps forgetting about him, Arthur decides to end his friendship with Buster until he learns who Mike really is, and Buster apologizes.
14a	14a	"Arthur the Wrecker"	Joe Fallon	Stéfanie Gignac	October 24, 1996	21B
Arthur borrows a new computer game from the Brain, but Mrs. Read needs to use her computer for tax season. When Buster visits, Arthur shows him the game, but just as Arthur is about to win, he and Buster squabble over the keyboard and accidentally knock it to the floor, causing the monitor to shut down permanently. With the Brain's help, they try to figure out what's wrong with Mrs. Read's computer before she comes home.
14b	14b	"Arthur and the True Francine"	Kathy Waugh	Angus Bungay	October 24, 1996	13B
While playing a game of Truth or Dare with Muffy, Francine recalls when they first met in second grade and became friends. Muffy lies about cheating on a test, causing Francine to be sentenced to detention for a week. When Francine is needed for an important softball game, and Muffy's falsehoods finally catch up to her, she finally comes clean, allowing Francine to return to the game.
15a	15a	"Arthur's Family Vacation"	Thomas LaPierre	François Brisson	October 25, 1996	2B
Arthur is down in the dumps when he misses his second chance to go to Camp Meadowcroak with Buster since he is going on a road trip with the Reads. They face many mishaps, such as their hotel reservation getting canceled, and it always rains until the last day of their trip. When Arthur returns, he is lucky that Buster had an even worse trip than him.
15b	15b	"Grandpa Dave's Old Country Farm"	Matt Steinglass	John Pagan & Norm Roen	October 25, 1996	8A
Arthur and D.W. visit their Grandpa, Dave Read, who lives on an old, rundown farm. Grandpa Dave refuses their help running it, but Arthur and D.W. are concerned by the state of things and try to help him fix up the farm with the help of his friends.
16a	16a	"Arthur and the Crunch Cereal Contest"	Peter K. Hirsch	Jean Lajeunesse	October 28, 1996	11B
Arthur is determined to win a year's supply of his favorite breakfast cereal, Crunch, by composing a jingle, but he cannot come up with any ideas. He hears D.W. singing a song about Nadine and copies it. Arthur feels guilty, so he mails the song with D.W.'s name instead of his, and it wins the contest, much to D.W.'s confusion.
16b	16b	"D.W. Flips"	Peter K. Hirsch	Gerry Capelle	October 28, 1996	23B
D.W. is jealous of a little girl named Emily Leduc, performing in their gymnastics class and is determined to become better than her, which jeopardizes her when she climbs on a high balance beam and nearly injures herself. Afterward, D.W. and Emily apologize to one another and become friends.
17a	17a	"Meek for a Week"	Joe Fallon	Jean Charles Fink	October 29, 1996	20B
Annoyed by Francine's attitude, Muffy bets that she can't be nice for a week. Noticing how straining the bet is on Francine, Arthur, Buster, and the Brain try to get her to lose her temper, but Francine manages to keep it under control until the bet is over.
17b	17b	"Arthur, World's Greatest Gleeper"	Matt Steinglass	Myron Born	October 29, 1996	6A
When Arthur and Buster are forced to eat lunch with Binky's gang, the Tough Customers, they tell Arthur they think he has never "gleeped" anything, but to impress them, he tells them he has, only to find out later that "gleep" is slang for "steal." Rumors spread about Arthur being a thief, while Binky's gang pressures him into their ranks.
18a	18a	"Arthur's Chicken Pox"	Kathy Waugh	Russel Crispin	October 30, 1996	5B
Arthur is looking forward to his family trip to the Elwood City Circus, but he gets a disturbing case of chicken pox and is anxiously skeptical if he will get better in time for the occasion. When his Grandma, Thora Read, visits to take care of Arthur, D.W. gets jealous of the attention he gets and tries to fake that she has chicken pox.
18b	18b	"Sick as a Dog"	Joe Fallon	Jean Charles Fink	October 30, 1996	24A
Arthur is upset when he realizes that Pal has to stay at the vet's office overnight for being sick. He blames D.W. for this, but when the vet informs him that Pal has been eating too much human food, he has to apologize to D.W. and learn what Pal is and isn't supposed to eat.
19a	19a	"D.W. Rides Again"	Joe Fallon	Gerry Capelle	October 31, 1996	14A
D.W. gets a new two-wheel bike for a bike-riding fundraiser after the Tibble twins tease her for her tricycle. She tries to learn to ride it with Arthur's assistance. After several injuries, D.W. gets the hang of riding her bike.
19b	19b	"Arthur Makes the Team"	Tom Hertz	Jean Lajeunesse	October 31, 1996	24B
Arthur and his friends try out for the baseball team, and Arthur struggles with catching the ball while Francine cannot throw accurately. When Francine wishes for her father, Oliver Frensky, to kick Arthur off the team, thinking he is the reason the team is not doing well, he makes Arthur and Francine coach each other to get better.
20a	20a	"Arthur's Almost Boring Day"	Joe Fallon	Stefanie Gignac	November 1, 1996	15B
Arthur and his friends are assigned to write about what they do over the weekend, but the rain ruins their plans. Arthur and D.W. bother each other and are sent to Grandma Thora's, where she shows them old home movies and comic books that give Arthur a great idea for his assignment.
20b	20b	"The Half-Baked Sale"	Ken Scarborough	Jean Lajeunesse	November 1, 1996	26B
Grandma Thora is oblivious to the fact that she is a poor cook, and when she bakes cookies for a school bake sale, Arthur and D.W. try to stop her bad cooking from ruining the bake sale without hurting her feelings.
21a	21a	"Sue Ellen Moves In"	Joe Fallon	Gerry Capelle	November 4, 1996	27B
Rumors circulate about Sue Ellen and her family, who have just moved into the neighborhood. Buster jumps to the false conclusion that they are aliens and tries to expose them, but everyone else learns how Sue Ellen traveled the world and changes their opinions of her.
21b	21b	"The Perfect Brother"	Joe Fallon	Stefanie Gignac	November 4, 1996	25B
The Brain spends the weekend with the Reads while his parents visit an ice cream convention. The Brain is neat as two pins, finishes his homework early, and reads to D.W., making Arthur jealous. When the Brain invites Arthur over to his house, Arthur learns that he is messy and acts polite because he is a guest.
22a	22a	"D.W.'s Snow Mystery"	Joe Fallon	Gerry Capelle	November 5, 1996	15A
D.W. keeps a snowball in the freezer from "the best day of her life," but it disappears the next day, and D.W. is mortified. Buster and Francine investigate, listening to biased accounts of those present the day the snowball went missing. After several arguments and accusations, D.W. lets the incident go as the year's first snowfall appears.
22b	22b	"Team Trouble"	Joe Fallon	Gerry Capelle	November 5, 1996	25A
Arthur, Buster, and Francine are assigned to do a group project on Ancient Rome. They separately work on a comic book, which ends up inconsistent and not working due to disagreements. They learn that they have to work together to make a good project.
23a	23a	"Bully for Binky"	Joe Fallon	Gerry Capelle	November 6, 1996	12B
Binky nefariously teases Sue Ellen, who demands that he apologize. When he does not, she challenges him to a fight to settle it. He is nervous about it, especially when he finds out she knows Tae Kwon Do and tries to beat her in music instead. When Sue Ellen is better than him in that as well, Binky accepts that Sue Ellen is tougher than him.
23b	23b	"Misfortune Teller"	Joe Fallon	Luc Savoie	November 6, 1996	26A
For her half-birthday, Prunella's older sister, Rubella Deegan, gives her a cootie catcher. Rubella claims that it can tell the future and that its answers will come true. Arthur and his friends begin following the advice of the cootie catcher. When the catcher is wrecked, they realize they should not let it maintain their lives.
24a	24a	"Arthur's Tooth"	James Greenberg	Jean Charles Fink	November 7, 1996	13A
Arthur has a loose tooth but is the only one in his class who has not yet lost any of his baby teeth. He tries to pull it out to get Francine to quit teasing him, but nothing works. So Arthur learns that people lose their baby teeth at different ages and tells Francine, only for her to accidentally hit him with a ball and finally knock out his tooth.
24b	24b	"D.W. Gets Lost"	Joe Fallon	Kevin Currie	November 7, 1996	22A
D.W. wants earrings because Emily has them. Mrs. Read then takes her shopping for earrings the next day, and while at the superstore, they run into Muffy's father, Edward "Ed" Crosswire, who needs to speak with Mrs. Read. All fed up, D.W. wanders off and gets lost in the store. While trying to find her way back, she runs into Emily and sees her earrings have turned her ears green. Upon returning to Mrs. Read, D.W. changes her mind about wanting earrings.
25a	25a	"D.W. Thinks Big"	Judy Rothman	Gerry Capelle	November 8, 1996	4B
D.W. wants to help at her aunt Lucy's wedding but is too little to do anything. Arthur is the ring bearer, and their rude cousin, Cora, is the flower girl. During the wedding, Cora distracts Arthur, causing him to accidentally throw Aunt Lucy's ring into the organ pipes. Arthur is too big to crawl into the organ, and Cora does not want to get dirty. D.W. volunteers and successfully retrieves the ring. As a reward, Aunt Lucy allows D.W. to be both the ring bearer and flower girl.
25b	25b	"Arthur Cleans Up"	Matt Steinglass	Jean Charles Fink	November 8, 1996	27A
When Arthur complains about the state of the park, Mr. Read begins a brigade for him and his friends to clean it. Arthur's friends are enraged at him for starting the brigade despite him trying to explain that it was Mr. Read's idea and not his. As a result, Arthur has to do the job himself, with only Oliver instructing him. However, the next day, Arthur stands up to the Tough Customers when they bully him and orders them to help him clean the park. Arthur's friends decide to help him after overhearing what is happening with the Tough Customers.
26a	26a	"My Dad, the Garbage Man"	Kathy Waugh	Jean Sarô	November 11, 1996	20A
Mr. Ratburn's class goes on field trips to several students' parents at work to learn about careers. Francine is embarrassed by Oliver's job as a garbage man and tries to cover it up by informing her friends that he is in a secret organization and only pretends to be a garbage man as a cover. However, Francine eventually admits that Oliver is a garbage man when everyone sees that he built a playground from things he found at the dump.
26b	26b	"Poor Muffy"	Ken Scarborough	Gerry Capelle	November 11, 1996	29B
Muffy is allergic to the new carpet in her house, so she stays with Francine while the carpeting is being extracted. During Muffy's stay, Francine is unable to handle Muffy's spoiled feelings, and Muffy can't deal with the less-than-wealthy condition in which the other Frenskys live.
27a	27a	"D.W.'s Blankie"	Tom Hertz	Stéfanie Gignac	November 12, 1996	17A
D.W. loses her favorite blanket, so she enlists Arthur's help to search for it, retracing her steps over the entire Elwood City. D.W. is upset when none of the businesses have her blanket, but when she struggles to sleep without it, Mrs. Read hands it over to D.W., telling her that she washed it.
27b	27b	"Arthur's Substitute Teacher Trouble"	Joe Fallon	Nadja Cozic	November 12, 1996	28A
When Mr. Ratburn loses his voice, his sister, Ms. Rodentia Ratburn, substitutes for him. She is a kindergarten teacher, and although the class is glad to have some easy work at first, they soon get bored, and they realize they miss Mr. Ratburn's tougher classes, so a cured Mr. Ratburn returns early from his week off.
28a	28a	"I'm a Poet"	Joe Fallon	Kevin Currie	November 13, 1996	28B
Fern Walters, one of Mr. Ratburn's students, is the only one in class to enter a poetry contest to be judged by the famous poet Jack Prelutsky. The others think poetry is uncool and start making fun of her. Fern bets them if they cannot write and submit their own poems, they must join the poetry club for a year. In doing so, Fern's friends find writing poetry fun. Guest star: Jack Prelutsky as himself.
28b	28b	"The Scare-Your-Pants-Off Club!"	Terence Taylor	Angus Bungay	November 13, 1996	10B
When their favorite series of books is banned from the library by a parental organization that believes scary books are mature for children, Arthur and his friends get together a petition to get them back—all except Muffy, that is, as it turns out that Ed and Mrs. Crosswire are the founders of the parental group. Everyone is surprised when the books' author arrives to defend her books, and she happens to be Ed's former teacher.
29a	29a	"My Club Rules"	Joe Fallon	Gerry Capelle	November 14, 1996	30B
Arthur and his friends create a club to exclude D.W., but neither can agree on the rules. Everyone starts creating their own clubs with strange rules, alienating those who want to join.
29b	29b	"Stolen Bike"	Kathy Waugh	Angus Bungay	November 14, 1996	30A
Francine's bike is too small for her, so Oliver finds his old bike, except she is embarrassed by the fact that it is old and rusty. When her friends tease her about the bike, she hides it and pretends it is stolen. The bike gets thrown out, and when Oliver finds it broken, they work together to fix it.
30a	30a	"Arthur's First Sleepover"	Joe Fallon	Jean Lajeunesse	November 15, 1996	16B
Arthur has his first sleepover with Buster and the Brain, even with all the talk of UFOs. D.W. wants to join them so that she can take a picture of a UFO. But the trio won't let her, so D.W. pranks them with a flashlight in retaliation, and payback hits when they shock her with a fake alien, then fooling her into spotting a fake UFO.
30b	30b	"Arthur's New Year's Eve"	Joe Fallon	Darren Brereton	November 15, 1996	29A
Arthur has never stayed up until midnight on New Year's Eve. His friends have different claims about what happens at midnight, so Arthur tries to stay up until New Year's Eve to discover what occurs. He is dismayed when he sleeps through it, although Grandma Thora reassures him that the following year will be exciting.

== Home media ==
In Europe, the season was released in full on a 3-disc set by Delta Leisure Group on April 7, 2008. In the US, select episodes were released on compilation VHS and DVD releases from Random House Home Video.
