= Vurtego =

Pogo stick

Closeup of Vurtego Stick [V1]

Vurtego Pogo Sticks are a variation of traditional pogo sticks that use air as the spring mechanism for jumping, instead of a traditional metal coil spring. These pogo sticks are designed to achieve extreme heights and allow riders to perform a wide variety of tricks.

There are a variety of advantages in using an air-powered pogo stick, ranging from adjustable spring tensions to overall weight to power ratio.

The air spring within a Vurtego pogo stick allows riders to pump the pogo stick up to their preferred air pressure in order to jump. The more air pressure that is pumped into the pogo stick, the stiffer the spring becomes. The same Vurtego pogo stick can be used by a 75 lb kid or a 300 lb fully grown adult, simply by adjusting the air pressure. Due to the air spring that is used in the Vurtego's pogo sticks, there is no maximum weight limit.

An air spring has advantages over other forms of pogo stick propulsion. An air spring weighs just about nothing compared to a traditional coil spring and is capable of far more power in relation to the overall weight of the spring. A metal spring capable of propelling a rider more than five feet in the air would need to weigh more than 30 pounds and is therefore infeasible. Elastomeric bands, which are used in a few pogo sticks available today, tend to degrade or break over time.

Vurtego pogo sticks weigh under 11 pounds (5 kg) and are capable of producing 1500 pounds-force (8,000 newtons) of thrust.

== Models ==
=== V1 ===
In January 2006 Vurtego released its first pogo stick, the V1. The V1 was the first air-powered extreme pogo stick ever sold and was capable of jumping more than seven feet high. The V1 utilized a custom extruded plastic cylinder body, billet aluminum footpegs, a non-rotating stainless steel shaft, and a nylon piston.

=== V2 ===
In 2008 Vurtego released a new version of the Vurtego, the 'V2.' The V2 is similar to the V1, except the shaft is rotated 45 degrees, adding strength. The pegs are larger and curved a bit at the bottom. There is a less expensive version of the V2, known as the 'power pogo', which boasts the same performance as the V2, but is made in China with cheaper material. Another version known as the V2 'Fit' is, as the name suggests, for exercise. The V2 comes in three sizes; Small [riders 5'0"-5'6"], Medium [5'4"-6'0"], and Large [5'10"+].

=== V3 ===
The next edition to the Vurtego series, known as the V3, became available in late 2009. The V3 is similar to a V2 but has an aluminum tube and a new boltless air piston. There were two versions, the standard V3 [grey anodized aluminum] and a black version known as the 'V3 Stealth'. The stealth version features an all black anodized aluminum tube and footpegs with the same performance as the standard V3. The V3 comes in three sizes.

=== V4 ===
In late 2015 Vurtego's latest pogo stick, the V4, was introduced. The V4 was the first major redesign since the V1. The entire design of the V4 was centered around the new Air Piston, which combined the spacer and piston designs from the V1-V3 to increase air volume by 10%. This additional air volume creates a smoother, softer bounce that feels very similar to a trampoline. The V4 jumps higher with less effort than its predecessors. To reduce friction during the bounce a smaller o-ring seal and new bushing were implemented. A much harder, 90a urethane donut with sound dampening nubs was integrated into the design, and four additional breather holes were added to the cylinder to increase the air flow. The stroke was extended by 1" on the V4 and 3" on the V4 Pro, allowing riders to jump higher without bottoming out the stroke. The last major update was a round Grip Tip, which provides the same amount of surface area no matter what angle a rider lands at. The V4 is offered in white, and the V4 Pro is offered in bright green.

==== Sizes ====
All of Vurtego's pogo sticks are offered in three different sizes:

- Small - 4'8" - 5'3" (147 cm - 161 cm) | 10 lbs (4.54 kg)
- Medium - 5'4" - 5'11" (162 cm - 181 cm) | 10.5 lbs (4.76 kg)
- Large - 6' - 6'6" (182 cm - 198 cm) | 11 lbs (5 kg)

==== Slingshot ====
In 2022 Vurtego announced that they were developing their first child-sized pogo stick, which is named the Slingshot. It uses the same adjustable air-powered spring as the V4 and previous models, but it is much smaller in size. Despite the size difference, it is still capable of jumping over 5' high, as well as doing a large variety of Extreme Pogo tricks, including flips. The Vurtego Slingshot launches on May 4, 2023, on indiegogo.

== World Records ==
Vurtego pogo sticks currently hold 8 world records.

=== Highest Jump on a Pogo Stick ===
11 feet 2.25 inches - set by Henry Cabelus on August 20, 2021

=== Highest Front Flip ===
10 feet 2 inches - set by Michael Mena in 2017

=== Most Consecutive Backflips ===
18 - set by Dmitry Arsenyev in 2015

=== Fastest Mile On A Pogo Stick ===
7:40 - set by Drew McQuiston in 2017

=== Most Consecutive Front Flips ===
8 - set by Henry Cabelus in 2016

=== Most Synchronized Backflips ===
15 - set by a bunch of people in 2014

=== Fewest Jumps in a Minute ===
38 - set by Henry Cabelus in 2016

=== Most Jumps in a Minute ===
266 - set by Tone Staubs in 2013

== See also ==
- Stunt Pogo
- Pogo Stick
