= Pogopalooza =

Annual extreme pogo competition

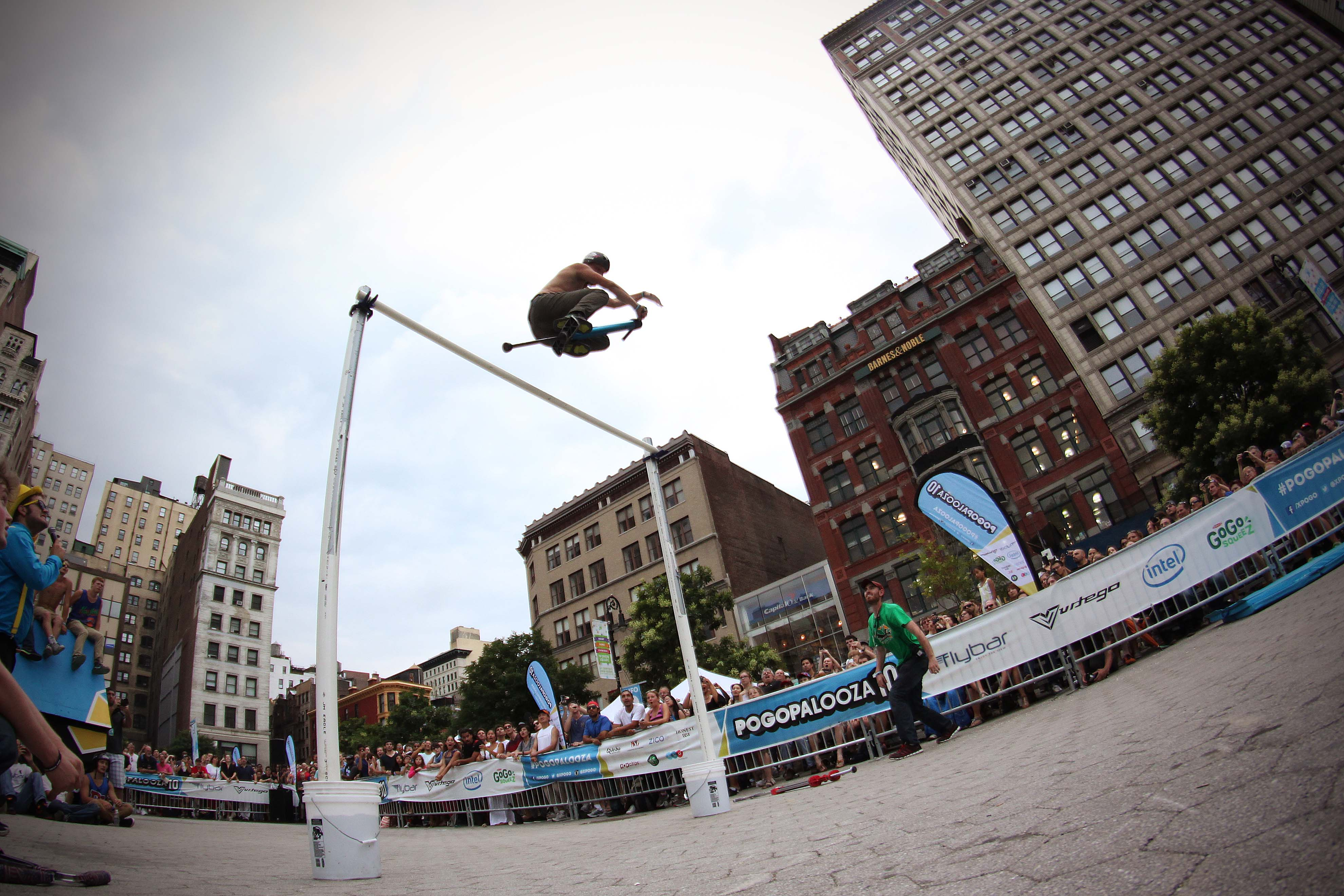
Pogopalooza 10 High Jump Record

Pogopalooza is an annual championship that brings together the world's top extreme pogo athletes for multiple days of competition, exhibition, and world record setting. Along with the competition, Pogopalooza also features the largest exposition of pogo stick companies, a Free Jump area for people of all ages to try out an array of pogo sticks, sponsorship activations, and experiences associated with the event. The organizers of Pogopalooza refer to the event as "the largest pogo stick event on the planet." Started by YouTube personality Pogobat in 2004 in a parking lot in Lincoln, Nebraska, Pogopalooza entered its 20th year for 2024 and has grown to be the largest and most widely attended property associated with the sport of Extreme Pogo.

The event has had many homes, and briefly was established as a global tour, and has been featured on ESPN as a part of its Ocho Day programming. It currently now is based in Xpogo LLC's home of Wilkinsburg, Pennsylvania.

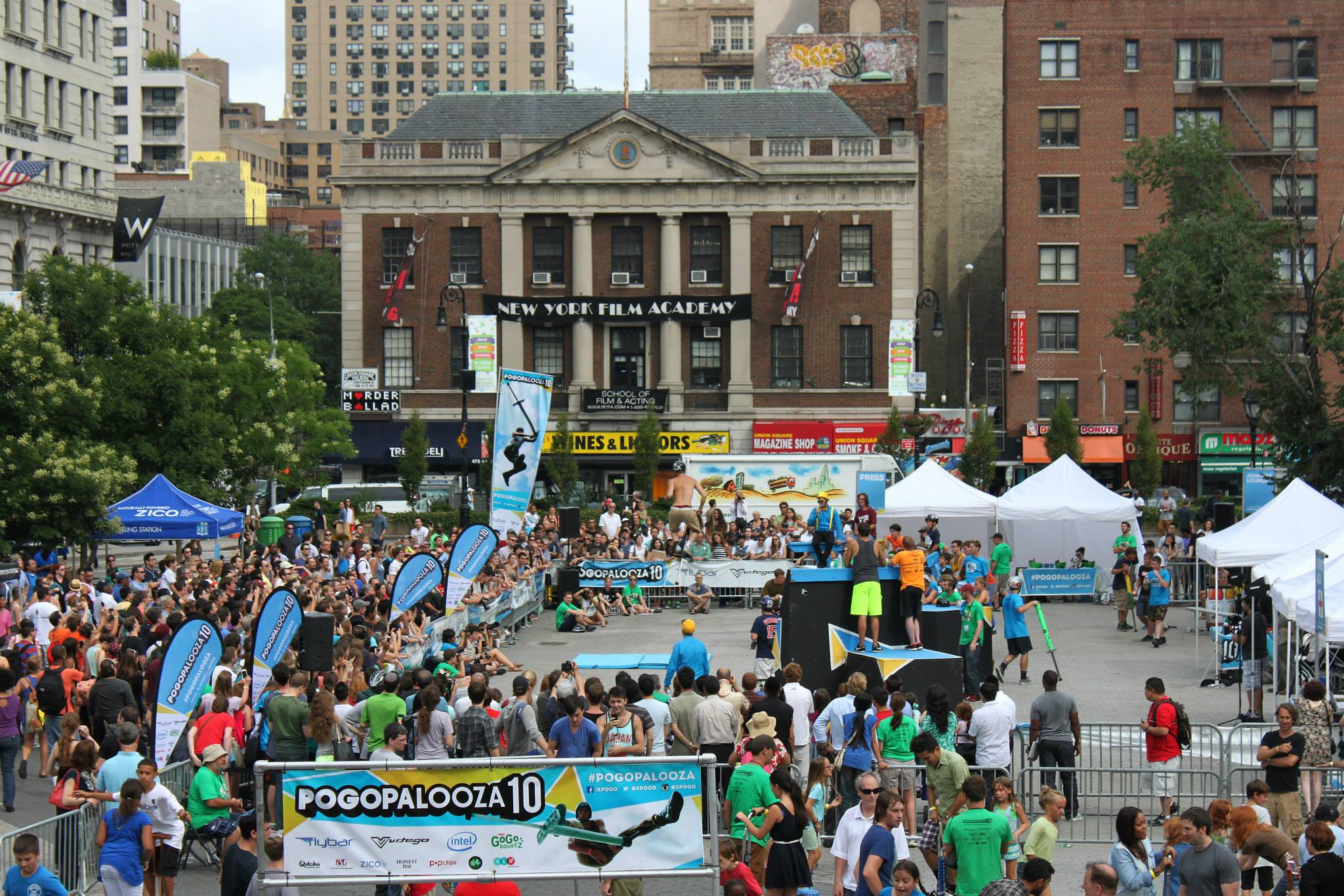
Pogopalooza 10 Crowd Shot

== The sport of Extreme Pogo ==
Extreme Pogo is an action sport which involves riding and performing tricks on extreme pogo sticks, defined as such by their durability and potential for height. It draws from influences of other action sports such as skate, BMX, Parkour and more, integrating the use of obstacles and performance of tricks.

Today's sticks have the potential for over 10 ft. of height (measured from the ground to the bottom of the tip). Extreme pogo is a young extreme sport and is currently emerging into popular culture as evidenced by the growing number of athletes around the globe, growing sales from extreme pogo companies, the popularity of Xpogo athlete exhibition teams, positive feedback and continued interest in Xpogo content.

== History ==
The first Pogopalooza was held in 2004 in a parking lot in Nebraska, organized by Dan Brown, one of the original Xpogo founders. While the event was small in scope and only drew friends and family, it set the precedent to hold an annual event bringing together extreme pogo athletes from around the country, and eventually the world. Each year since Pogopalooza 1, the event grew in scope and design. Gaining more structure, media attention, athlete attendance, Pogopalooza progressed steadily for 5 years. Pogopalooza 6 in 2009, which was held in Pittsburgh, Pennsylvania saw the biggest turnout of athletes yet, over 50+ from across the United States, Canada, and England and involved the whole of the City through four days of events and competition. Post-Pogopalooza 6 national media began to take note of extreme pogo in the biggest manner to date. The Wall Street Journal ran a front-page article on the sport and numerous other countrywide and even international publications began covering athletes, events, and the growth of extreme pogo in general. Pogopalooza 7, 8, and 9 represented steady progress as well, leading up to Pogopalooza 10, which stood as another breakout year. Widely attended and heavily covered, Pogopalooza 10 occurred in New York City across July 26-28th, 2013. After the event, organizers announced that the Pogopalooza competition would be expanded into a multi-city international touring format for 2014. Today, the event is referred to as "Pogopalooza: The World Championships of Pogo" and is based at Xpogo LLC's homebase of Wilkinsburg, Pennsylvania.

In 2022, Xpogo hosted the Pogopalooza Cup on ESPN2, as a part of their The Ocho Day in Rock Hill, South Carolina. This was an auxiliary freestyle competition and was won by Russ Kaus.

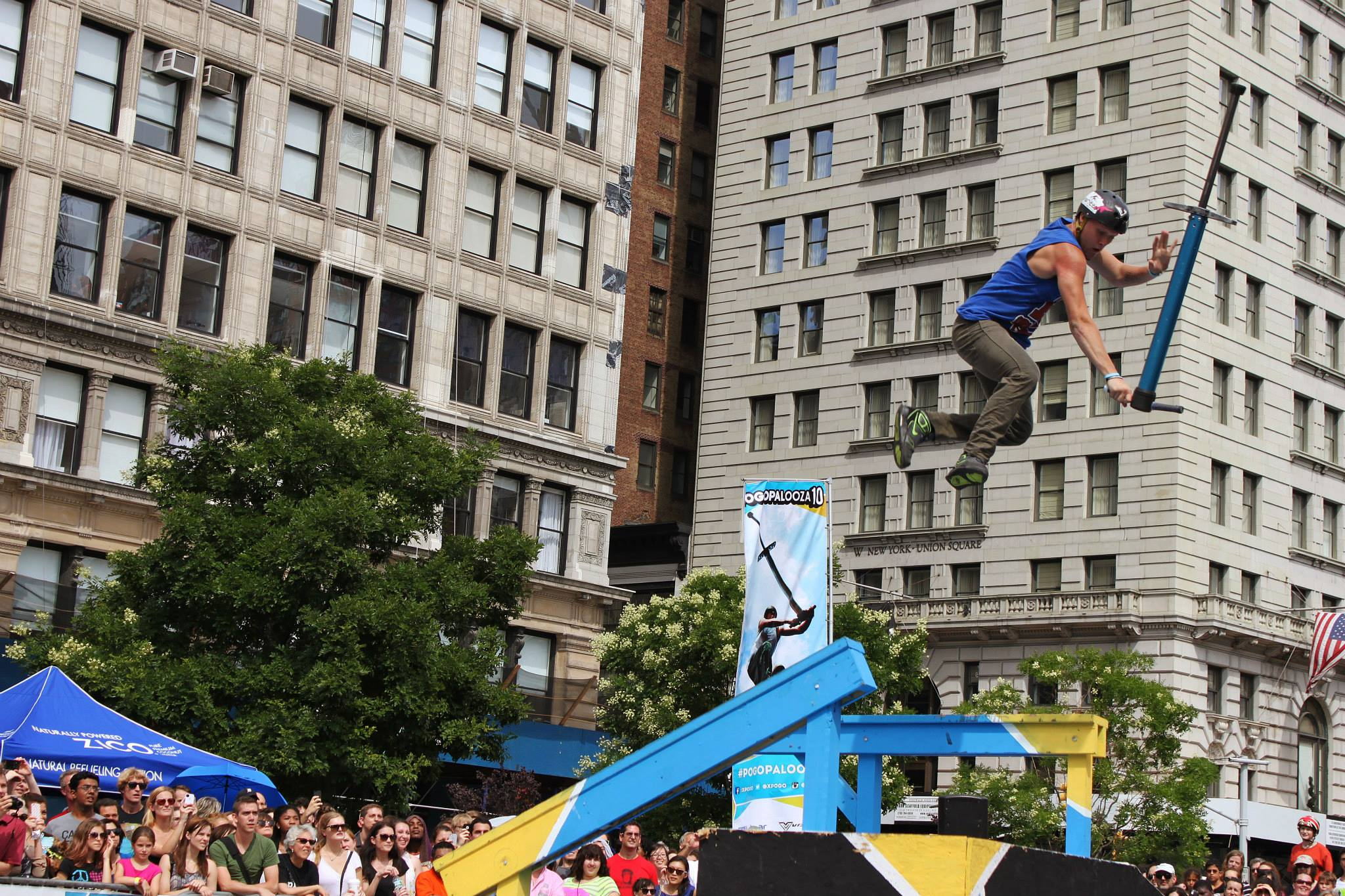
Pogopalooza Biff StickFlip

=== Overview ===
Pogopalooza features the top Xpogo athletes worldwide competing against each other in 4 main categories.

Events

Tech Freestyle is a run based competition where competitors are only permitted to use spring based pogo sticks. Athletes will perform timed runs on a specially designed course of obstacles, and are scored on a mix of their skill and style, with bails (falls) counting against their final score. Runs are scored by 5 judges, with the highest and lowest total scores being dropped.

Big Air Freestyle is a run-based event where competitors are permitted to use Big Air extreme sticks (typically Vurtego Pogo sticks) Athletes will perform timed runs on a specially designed course of obstacles, and are scored on a mix of their skill and style, with bails (falls) counting against their final score. Typically the Big Air Winner is considered the best extreme pogo sticker in the world for that year. Runs are scored by 5 judges, with the highest and lowest total scores being dropped.

High Jump is a competition to see who can clear the highest height over a bar on a pogo stick. Athletes are permitted to use multiple techniques to clear the bar. The current record holder and High Jump champion is Dalton Smith, who uses a stickflip technique, and achieved 12' at Pogopalooza 2022. Henry Cabelus holds the High Jump record for the straight jump method, which was set at Pogopalooza 2024 at 11' 7"

Best Trick is a jam based competition where athletes take turns during a 30-minute jam to land the best trick, as judged by 5 Pogopalooza judges, judges score based on trick difficulty, with an emphasis on tricks that have never been landed before. Participants can be removed by judges from the Jam if their attempted tricks are deemed not to be of winning quality.

15 and Under Kids Bounce Off The final event of Pogopalooza is open to competitors 15 years old and younger. They compete to see who can continually bounce the longest, with challenges such as bouncing no handed, being added after a certain time limit. The winner typically will receive a free pogo stick.

In addition to the competition, a world record day kicks off each Pogopalooza, where athletes attempt to break any one of the 15 Xpogo LLC-recognized Guinness World Records. Additionally, all of the world's top pogo stick manufacturers normally attend each Pogopalooza, exhibiting their products and allowing the public to try all pogo sticks in the Free Jump/Clinic area.

=== Previous Pogopalooza locations ===
Year	Name	Location(s)	Big Air Winner	Best Trick Winner	High Jump Winner Bold = World Record	Tech Winner
2004	Pogopalooza 1	Lincoln, Nebraska				
2005	Pogopalooza 2	Chicago, Illinois				
2006	Pogopalooza 3	Schodack, New York			**Nick McClintock** (7")	
2007	Pogopalooza 4	Huntington Beach, California		Nick McClintock	**Fred Grzybowski** (7'6")	
2008	Pogopalooza 5	Buena Park, California		Nick McClintock		
2009	Pogopalooza 6	Pittsburgh, Pennsylvania	Biff Hutchison	Jake Gartland	**Dan Mahoney** (8'6")	Earl Pote
2010	Pogopalooza 7	Salt Lake City, Utah	Fred Grzybowski	Dan Mahoney	**Dan Mahoney** (9'6")	Earl Pote
2011	Pogopalooza 8	Costa Mesa, California	Jake Gartland	Dan Mahoney	Dan Mahoney (9')	Tone Staubs / Nick Mcclintock*
2012	Pogopalooza 9	Costa Mesa, California	Biff Hutchison	Dan Mahoney	Biff Hutchison (8'6")	
2013	Pogopalooza 10	New York City, New York	Biff Hutchison	Dan Mahoney	**Biff Hutchison** (9'7.5")	N/A
2014	Pogopalooza 2014: FISE	Montpellier, France	Fred Grzybowski	Dmitry Arsenyev	**Dmitry Arsenyev (9'8")**	N/A
2014	Pogopalooza 2014: Pittsburgh	Pittsburgh, USA	Dalton Smith	Biff Hutchison	Dmitry Arsenyev (9")	N/A
2014	Pogopalooza 2014: Finals	Helsingborg, Sweden	Dalton Smith*	N/A	**Biff Hutchison** (9'9")	
2015	Pogopalooza 2015 US Open	US Open: Jacksonville, Florida, USA	Dmitry Arsenyev	Michael Mena	**Biff Hutchison** (10'0.25")	N/A
2015	Pogopalooza 2015 World Finals	World Finals: Philadelphia, Pennsylvania, USA	Dalton Smith	Nic Patino	**Dalton Smith / Biff Hutchison (tie)** (10'6")	N/A
2016	Pogopalooza 2016	Braddock, Pennsylvania	Dalton Smith	Steven Bennett	**Nic Patino** (10'6")	N/A
2017	No Pogopalooza					
2018	Pogopalooza 2018	Wilkinsburg, PA	Dalton Smith	Henry Cabelus	Henry Cabelus (10'6")	Michael Mena
2019	Pogopalooza 2019	WIlkinsburg, PA	Dalton Smith	Flynn Nyman	Michael Mena (10'6")	Tone Staubs
2020	Pogopalooza 2020	Wilkinsburg, PA	Dalton Smith	Russ Kaus	Dalton Smith (10'6")	Tone Staubs
2021	Pogopalooza 2021	Pittsburgh / WIlkinsburgh, PA	Dalton Smith	Steven Bennett	**Dalton Smith (11'8")**	Tone Staubs
2022	Pogopalooza 2022	Pittsburgh / Wilkinsburgh, PA	Konner Kellogg	Konner Kellogg	**Dalton Smith (12')**	Tone Staubs
2022	Pogopalooza Cup	Rock Hill, SC	Russ Kaus	N/A	N/A	N/A
2023	Pogopalooza 2023	Pittsburgh / Wilkinsburgh, PA	Henry Cabelus	Konner Kellogg	Michael Mena (11')	Tone Staubs
2024	Pogopalooza 2024	Pittsburgh / Wilkinsburgh, PA	Henry Cabelus	Duncan Murray	**Henry Cabelus (11'7")**	Earl Pote

*2008 had a Tech Flatland and a Tech Park competition, Tone Staubs won Flatland and Nick McClintock won park

=== Course design and construction ===
Xpogo LLC designs and builds the Pogopalooza courses. These courses consist of a series of boxes, ramps, steps, etc., which the jumpers utilize in their runs. The features of the course are most commonly topped with plywood and the frame made from two by fours. The final products are then painted. A new course is constructed for each Pogopalooza and then dismantled afterwards.

=== Multiple Time Pogopalooza Champions ===
Dalton Smith is considered by many to be the greatest competitor in Pogopalooza history with 11 total gold medals, Dan Mahoney has 7 combined medals, and Biff Hutchison has 8.

Athlete	Big Air Gold Medals	Best Trick Gold Medals	High Jump Gold Medals	Tech Gold Medals
Konnor Kellog	1	2	0	0
Steven Bennet	0	2	0	0
Michael Mena	0	1	2	1
Fred Grzybowski	2	0	0	0
Tone Staubs	0	0	0	5
Dalton Smith	7	0	4	0
Russ Kaus	1	1	0	0
Henry Cabelus	2	1	2	0
Dmitry Arsenyev	0	1	2	0
Biff Hutchison	3	0	5	0
Jake Gartland	1	1	0	0
Dan Mahoney	0	4	3	0
Nick McClintock	0	2	1	1
Nic Patino	0	1	1	0
Earl Pote	0	0	0	3
