= Jumping stilts =

Type of stilts

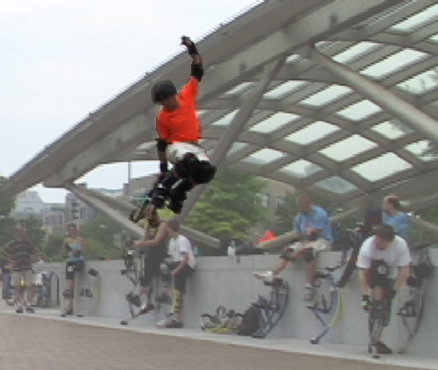
A man performs a grab at the Capital Bocking USA Meetup.

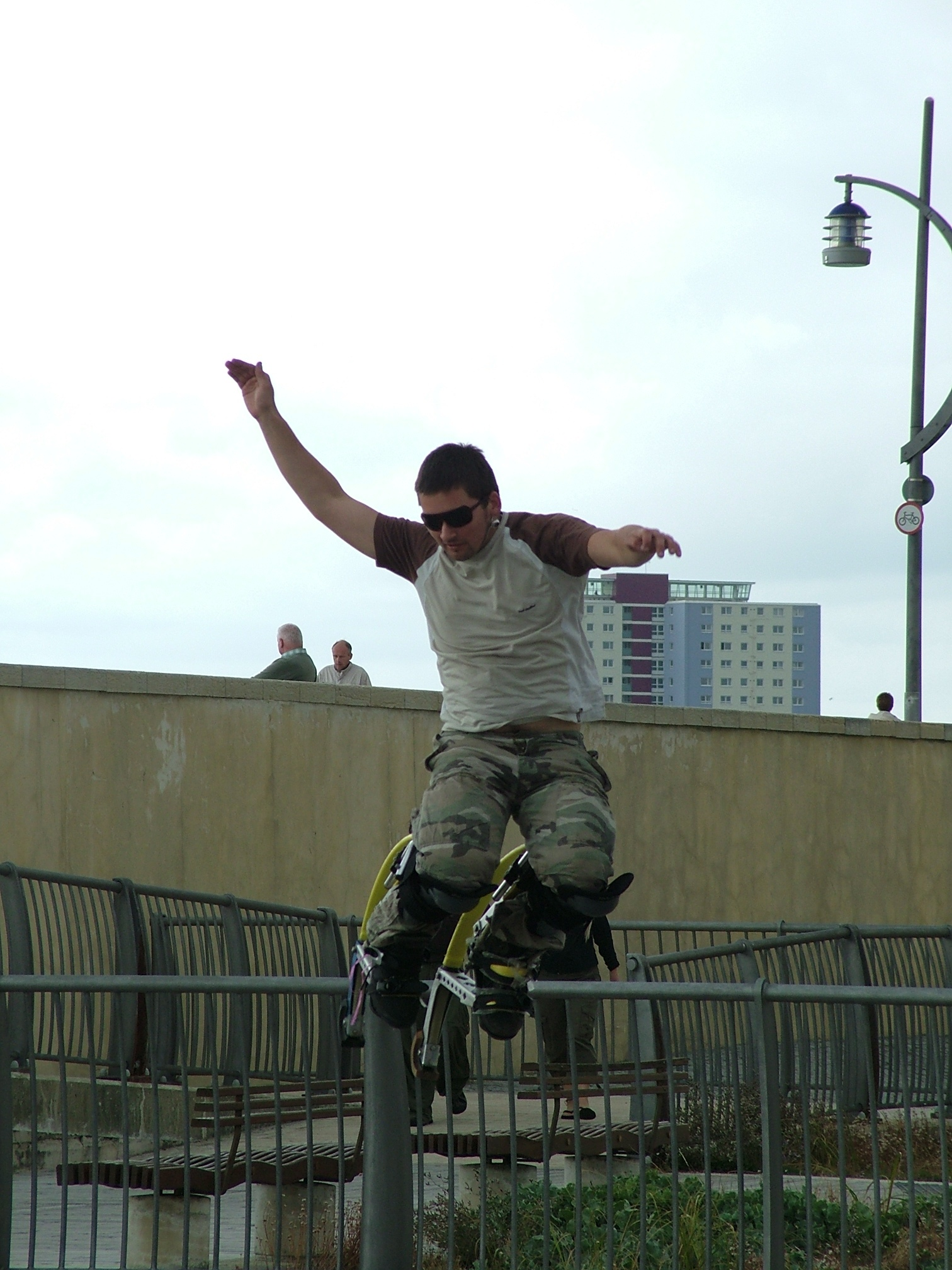
A powerbocker

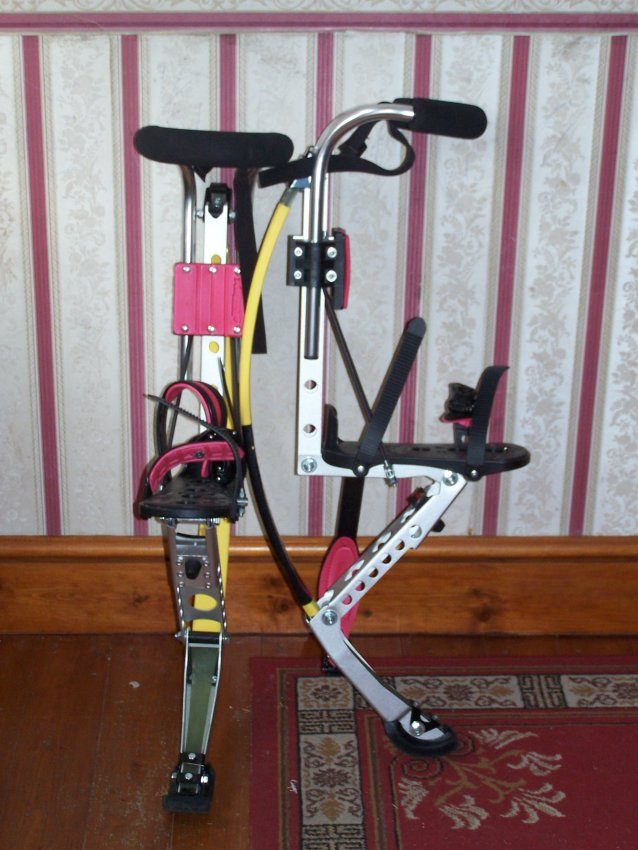
A pair of M60 Powerizers

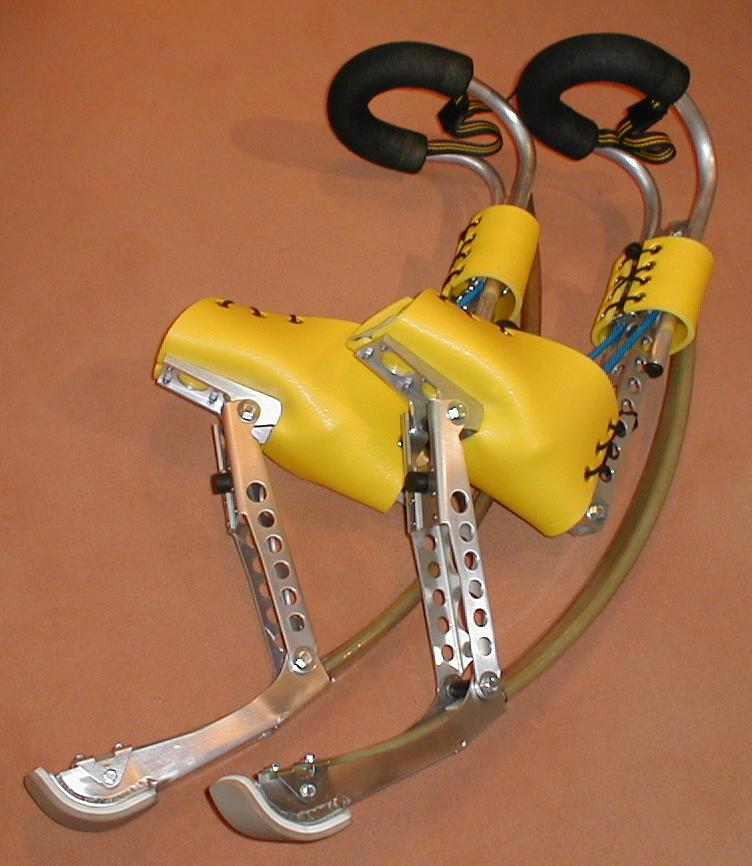
A pair of Powerskips

Jumping stilts, bounce stilts or spring stilts are special stilts that allow the user to run, jump and perform various acrobatics. Spring stilts using fiberglass leaf springs were patented in the United States in 2004 under the trademark "PowerSkip", marketed for recreational and extreme sports use. Spring stilts are often mostly made of aluminium. Using these stilts is also called "bocking" or "powerbocking", derived from Alexander Böck, the stilts' inventor.

== Powerbocking ==
The act of "bocking" or "powerbocking" includes jumping, running, and performing acrobatics with elastic-like spring-loaded stilts. They can be used to jump great distances and allow the user to bounce over people and cars and to perform backflips. For some, it is an extreme sport; for others, it is a form of exercise, artistic expression and a form of entertainment.

The stilts are often referred to generically as bocks or powerbocks; as power stilts, jumping stilts, bounce stilts or spring stilts; or by their brand name.

== Description ==
Each boot consists of a foot-plate with snowboard type locking straps, rubber foot pad which is also commonly called a hoof, and a fibreglass leaf spring. Using only their weight, and few movements, the user is generally able to jump 3–5 ft (1–1.5 metres) off the ground and run up to 20 mph (32 km/h). They also give the ability to take up to 9-foot (2.7 metres) strides.

Jumping stilts were used in the closing ceremony of the 2008 Olympic games in Beijing.

== Brands ==
They were originally patented by Alexander Böck, from Germany (European Patent EP 1 196 220 B1 on 2 July 2003, US Patent No. 6,719,671 B1 on 13 April 2004, both with a priority date of 20 July 1999), as "Powerskip". Many people also use common brand names to refer to them generically. Common brand names are 7 League Boots, Air-Trekkers, Powerizers, Pro-Jump, and Powerskips.

== Accidents ==
On 4 December 2010 Samuel Koch was heavily injured during the show Wetten, dass..? during a stunt where he attempted to jump over multiple moving cars in succession. He failed to clear one of the moving vehicles and was left tetraplegic after suffering severe injuries to his neck and spine.

== Competition ==
Two competitions exist in France: the Nancy Power Days (since 2009) in Nancy and the Riser Winter Cup (since 2015) in Lille.

== Similar devices ==
Though similar in appearance, jumping stilts are not to be confused with the use of prosthetic devices such as those used by paralympic runners Oscar Pistorius or Jonnie Peacock.

Moon shoes and PyonPyon jumpers are earlier attempts at jumping shoes using a different technique. Some are still popular today. There is a Swiss product "Kangoo Jumps", with cantilever springs under the shoes, which is promoted more for fitness than large leaps. Rocket boots were designed in the 1970s for the Russian Army, and use combustion pistons rather than springs for a similar effect.

Similar devices appear in the Portal video game series, allowing the protagonist Chell to survive falls from great height unharmed, though they do not affect her ability to walk or jump.

An English folklore figure spring-heeled Jack has been conjectured by some investigators to have been a prankster using spring-loaded leaping aids as early as 1837.

Spring stilts using steel coil springs, an antecedent of the pogo stick, were attempted in the 19th century.
