= Moon shoes =

Footwear with trampoline-like springs

Moon shoes are shoes for children fitted with trampoline-like springs. They were billed as "mini-trampolines for your feet". They were part of a merchandising effort by Nickelodeon.

== History ==
The original moon shoes were introduced in the 1950s and were metal in construction. They were made to fit over the wearer's regular shoes much in the same way as clamp on roller skates. The Nickelodeon product featured closed sides, plastic construction, and bungee-style springs which can be considered a safety improvement.

Moon shoes can be seen in the 1985 film Back To The Future when the main protagonist Marty McFly is walking to the diner through the town square.

== See also ==
- Powerbocking
