= Extreme pogo =

Action sport played with pogo sticks

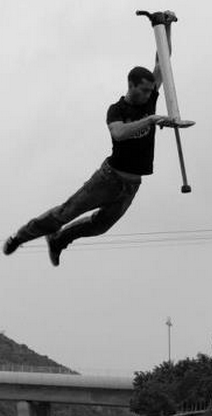
Superman Trick in Hong Kong

Extreme pogo is an action sport which involves riding and performing tricks using a pogo stick. The sport draws inspiration from other action sports such as skateboarding, BMX, and parkour. Athletes will have various focuses in tricks or street style bouncing using urban environments as obstacles. Extreme pogo can be seen in athlete exhibition teams, content on sites such as YouTube, and also the annual Pogopalooza: The World Championship of Pogo, which has been held worldwide, although is currently based in Wilkinsburg, Pennsylvania, home of Xpogo, a business which produces the competition and manages many properties in the world of extreme pogo.

== History ==
=== Beginnings ===
The beginnings of Extreme pogo are contested, but it is acknowledged among the pogo community that Dave Armstrong from Provo, Utah, was likely the first individual in the 20th century to make a conscious and consistent effort to execute tricks on a traditional steel spring pogo stick, beginning in 1999. Dave created a website named Xpogo.com around that time, to share pictures and videos of his bouncing. Shortly after Armstrong, several other individuals began to independently form the idea of creating an extreme sport around pogo. Among these were Nick McClintock, Nick Ryan, Fred Grzybowski, Dan Brown, Rick Gorge, and Matt Malcolm. Each believing they had solely created the sport, the collective founders of extreme pogo eventually connected via Xpogo.com. Together they shared their tricks and associated media, effectively laying the groundwork for the sport. The first extreme pogo stick came out in 2004 that was able to carry the weight of an adult and reach heights of about 6ft.

=== Classic sticks ===
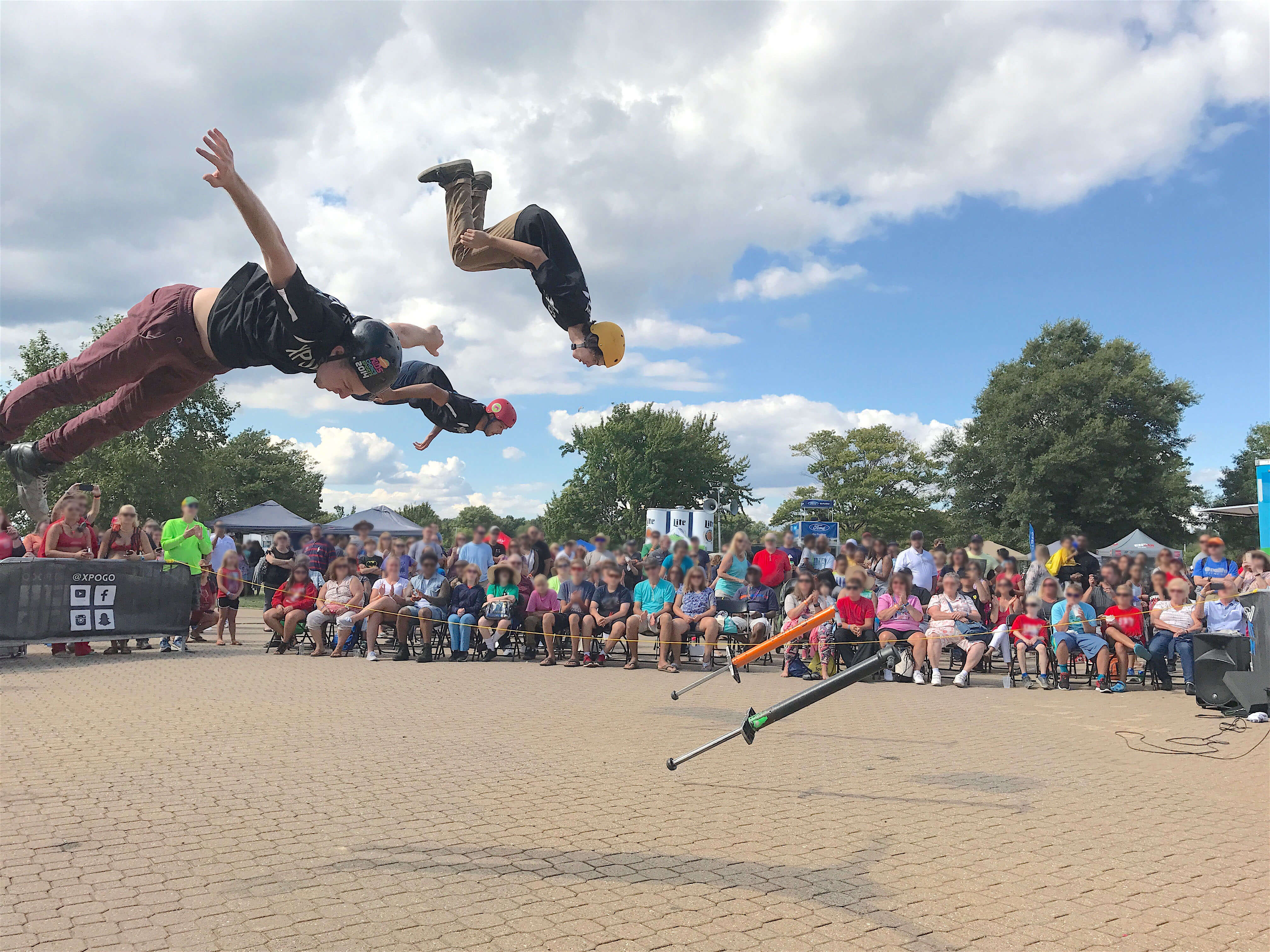
An extreme pogo exhibition in 2017.

From 2000 to 2004, groups of extreme pogo athletes began emerging around the United States and other countries such as the Netherlands, inspired by Xpogo.com. During this time there were no 'extreme' sticks, only traditional steel spring sticks that could be purchased at established retailers. Each group of jumpers took their own names and made associated websites to help differentiate themselves from the larger community. These groups included Team Xpogo, Team Hyper Pogo, Pogo Cult, Rittman Pogo, Grand Theft Pogo, Say No To Park, and The Pogo Squad, from York, PA.

As each of these groups developed and motivated other individuals around the country to begin bouncing as well, a core group of tricks were created that served as the building blocks for all trick innovation to come. A series of grabs, stalls, spins, and wraps utilizing the two foot pegs, two handlebars, and the frame of the pogo stick became the commonly executed tricks. Simple descriptive names such as "One-Foot Peg Grab" or "Under-the-Leg Bar Spin" were used to describe some tricks, while others received more specialized names such as "Malcolm X" (180 no-foot peg grab) and "Candy Bar" (one leg between the handlebars while jumping). Other tricks are related to BMX and skateboarding tricks such as "Can-Can" and "Heel Clicker."

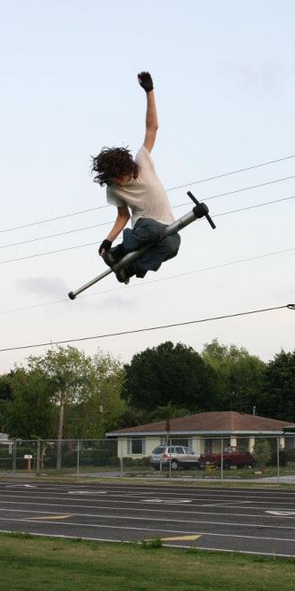
Peg Grab

Prior to the advent of social media sites such as YouTube and Facebook, the majority of the communication and media sharing among extreme pogo enthusiasts occurred on Xpogo forums where, by 2004, there were 50–100 dedicated users and many more casual or "silent" users. Due to the continued growth of the online community and the sport as a whole, member Dan Brown decided to hold an event called Pogopalooza, where some of the top individuals in the sport could come together in person and hold a miniature competition and exhibition of the sport. In the summer of 2004, Dan Brown hosted Pogopalooza 1 in a church parking lot in Nebraska where about seven members of the Xpogo community appeared. While the event was small and only attracted friends and family, it set the precedent to holding an annual event bringing together extreme pogo athletes from around the US (and subsequently from other countries).

=== Extreme sticks ===
2004 was the first year that "extreme" pogo sticks were made available. Defined as being able to support riders of adult weights while carrying a height potential of 6+ feet, the first extreme pogo stick was the Flybar 1200, by S.B.I. Enterprises. Instead of using a traditional steel spring, the Flybar utilized giant rubber "elastomers," creating a bungee-like jumping sensation. The new height potential made possible by the Flybar allowed new tricks, such as the first full backflip on a pogo stick, by Brian "Chewy" Call in 2005.

Shortly after the release of the Flybar, a company emerged in Southern California with the "MotoStik" pogo, which used a dual-spring technology with Moto X–style handlebars designed for cross-training. The next extreme pogo stick, the Vurtego, was launched in 2006. This produced the greatest height of any stick to date along with the greatest durability. The Vurtego uses pneumatic technology, being filled with compressed air and utilizing an air piston, allowing athletes to tailor the resistance of their bounces. In 2008, the BowGo, which had been in development since 2001 at Carnegie Mellon University, became available. Using a giant fiberglass bow on the front end of the pogo stick which flexed outward with downward pressure and snapped back in to produce upward momentum, the BowGo launched riders higher and more consistently than any other stick to date. The TK8 pogo stick was another air compressed design launched in France and Andorra around 2010. The top extreme pogo US athletes worked in parallel with extreme pogo companies to help further development.

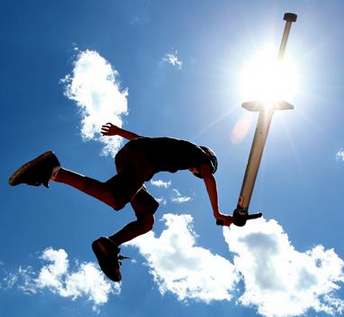
Stickflip in Park City, Utah

The majority of pro extreme pogo athletes currently ride Vurtego V5 pogo sticks. These sticks utilize an air shaft technology allowing for the highest recorded heights on pogo sticks. Guinness records recognizes multiple high jump techniques, which have resulted in multiple high jump records. Dalton Smith has the highest ever jump on a pogo stick, reaching 12 feet 3 inches (3.73 m) using a stick flip technique. Henry Cabelus has completed the highest straight jump, reaching 11 feet 2 inches (3.40 m), and Tyler Phillips has the highest front flip, reaching 10 feet 2 inches (3.10 m).

=== Pogopalooza 6 and beyond ===
By 2009, the extreme pogo community had grown into the hundreds, with hundreds to potentially thousands more followers and fans globally. Pogopalooza had occurred 4 additional times in 2005, 2006, 2007, and 2008, increasing in scope and attendance each year. Pogopalooza 6, which was held in Pittsburgh, Pennsylvania, saw the biggest turnout of athletes yet, over 50+ from across the United States, Canada, and England and involved the entire city through four days of events and competition.

After Pogopalooza 6, national media began taking note of extreme pogo in the biggest manner to date. The Wall Street Journal ran a front-page article on the sport and numerous other countrywide and even international publications began covering athletes, events, and the growth of extreme pogo in general. With the media push, more athletes began to emerge around the country and the globe, pushing trick innovation to new levels.

=== Xpogo LLC ===
In June 2010, three of the sport’s original founders—Nick Ryan, Nick McClintock, and Fred Grzybowski—formed Xpogo LLC, a company dedicated to managing the global operations of extreme pogo. According to the Xpogo LLC mission statement, the company "strives to develop the sport of Xpogo through the management of competitions, strategic partnerships, merchandising and retail, talent, platforms, and content. The company’s ultimate goal is to grow Xpogo into a cultural staple."

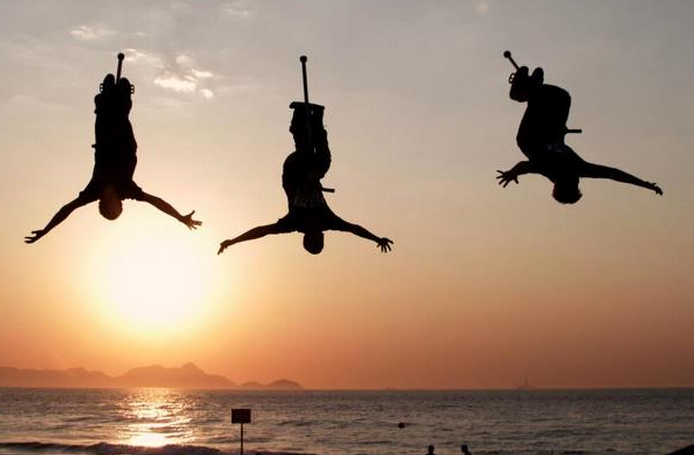
No-Handed Backflips in Rio de Janeiro, Brazil

Following the founding of Xpogo LLC, the infrastructure surrounding the growing sport became more defined. Pogopalooza 7 (Salt Lake City), Pogopalooza 8 (Costa Mesa), Pogopalooza 9 (Costa Mesa), and Pogopalooza 10 (New York City) were of professional grade, drawing tens of thousands of spectators in total and earning hundreds of millions of media impressions. Today, Xpogo LLC acts as the governing body for the sport, representing the top extreme pogo athletes worldwide, releasing and distributing professional content, and producing competitions and clinics.

=== Pogopalooza 2014 and beyond ===
After a widely attended and covered Pogopalooza 10 in New York City in 2013, the Pogopalooza competition expanded into a multi-city international touring format from 2014 – 2016. In 2017 no Pogopalooza event was held. It has since resumed and taken place in Xpogo LLC's home of Wilkinsburg, PA, just outside of Pittsburgh

=== Present-day pogo ===
The expansion of competitions, the recognition of Pro Athletes and Semi-Pro Athletes, many highly viewed commercials, music videos, and media featuring Extreme pogo athletes, A new organization AllPogo, was founded in 2018 which is dedicated to maintaining the pogo community, publishing a "trick list" on their site, which hosts a comprehensive library of pogo tricks, as well as hosting various community events. While not mainstream, the sport has made inroads, being featured on America's Got Talent, ESPN, and featured athlete collaborations with Dude Perfect, Braille Skateboarding, and Athletes like Dalton Smith and Xpogo have built large Instagram followings.

== See also ==
- Extreme sports
