= The Garcias =

2022 American sitcom

- Genre: Sitcom
- Created by: Jeff Valdez and Mickey & Gibby Cevallos
- Developed by: Jeff Valdez
- Starring: Ada Maris; Carlos Lacámara; Alvin Alvarez; Bobby Gonzalez; Nitzia Chama; Maeve Garay; Vaneza Pitynski; Paul Rodriguez Jr.; Oliver Alexander; Jeffrey Licon; Elsha Kim; Trinity Jo-Li Bliss; Ayva Severy
- Composer: Gilde Flores
- Country of origin: United States
- Original language: English
- No. of seasons: 1
- No. of episodes: 10

Production
- Executive producers: Jeff Valdez; Sol Trujilo
- Producer: Luisa Gomez de Silva
- Cinematography: Carlos González; Brandon Mastrippolito
- Editor: Marcelo Sansevieri
- Running time: 24–27 minutes
- Production company: New Cadence Productions

Original release
- Network: HBO Max; Nickelodeon
- Release: April 14 – May 12, 2022

Related
- The Brothers García

The Garcias is an American sitcom developed by Jeff Valdez that premiered on the streaming service HBO Max and Nickelodeon on April 14, 2022. The series is a sequel to The Brothers García. In December 2022, the series was canceled after one season.

== Cast and characters ==
=== Main ===
- Ada Maris as Sonia García
- Carlos Lacámara as Ray García
- Alvin Alvarez as Larry García
- Bobby Gonzalez as George García
- Nitzia Chama as Ana García
- Maeve Garay as Victoria García
- Vaneza Pitynski as Lorena García-Ramirez
- Paul Rodriguez Jr. as Julian Ramirez
- Oliver Alexander as Max García-Ramirez
- Jeffrey Licon as Carlos García
- Elsha Kim as Yunjin Huh García
- Trinity Jo-Li Bliss as Alexa Huh García
- Ayva Severy as Andrea Huh García

=== Special guest stars ===
- Jeremy Ray Valdez as Conner Rascon
- Carmen Carrera as Kim
- Emilio Rivera as Shaman
- Adrian Gonzalez as Pablo
- Jaime Aymerich as Pato
- Omar Leyva as Sol

== Episodes ==
No.	Title	Directed by	Written by	Original release date
1	"Helicopter Dads"	Mickey Cevallos	Jeff Valdez	April 14, 2022
2	"The Compromise"	Mickey Cevallos	Teleplay by : Abraham Alfonso Brown; Story by : Abraham Alfonso Brown and Jeff Valdez	April 14, 2022
3	"Sonia's Secret"	John Quigley	GiGi Rios New	April 14, 2022
4	"Guess Who's Coming to Breakfast, Lunch, and Dinner"	Jeff Valdez	Nick Lopez	April 21, 2022
5	"Just Trying to Help"	Jeff Valdez	Jeff Valdez	April 21, 2022
6	"Hurricane Schmurricane"	Carlos González	Joey Gutierrez	April 28, 2022
7	"Two Peas in a Chultum"	Jeannette Godoy	Nick Lopez	April 28, 2022
8	"Truth Hurts"	Alfredo Ramos	GiGi Rios New	May 5, 2022
9	"Back to the Roots"	Carlos González	Abraham Alfonso Brown	May 5, 2022
10	"Never a Dull Moment"	Jeff Valdez	Teleplay by : Joey Gutierrez; Story by : Joey Gutierrez and Jeff Valdez	May 12, 2022

== Production ==
=== Development ===
On April 30, 2021, HBO Max gave production a series order consists of ten episodes titled as The Garcias, a sequel to The Brothers García. The sequel is developed by Jeff Valdez who is also executive producing it alongside Sol Trujilo. New Cadence Productions is the company involved with producing the series. The series was released on April 14, 2022. In December 2022, the series was canceled, with the rights reverting to the production studio.

=== Casting ===
Upon the series order announcement, it was reported that Carlos Lacámara, Ada Maris, Jeffrey Licon, Bobby Gonzalez, Vaneza Pitynski, and Alvin Alvarez are set to reprise their roles. On July 8, 2021, Oliver Alexander, Nitzia Chama, Maeve Garay, Elsha Kim, Ayva Severy, and Trinity Jo-Li Bliss joined the main cast.

=== Filming ===
Principal photography for the series was scheduled to begin in June 2021 in Puerto Aventuras, Mexico. On July 8, 2021, it was reported that the series is filming in Riviera Maya, Mexico, in and around the town of Puerto Aventuras.

== Reception ==
The review aggregator website Rotten Tomatoes reported a 33% approval rating with an average rating of 4.5/10, based on 6 critic reviews.
