= What a Country! =

American television sitcom

- Genre: Sitcom
- Based on: Mind Your Language
- Developed by: Martin Rips; Joseph Staretski
- Written by: Frank Mula; Martin Rips; Leonard Ripps; Mike Scully; Joseph Staretski
- Directed by: Peter Baldwin; Robert Claver; Linda Day; Dolores Ferraro; Russ Petranto
- Starring: Garrett M. Brown; Yakov Smirnoff; George Murdock; Vijay Amritraj; Harry Waters, Jr. Ada Maris; Julian Reyes; Leila Hee Olsen; Gail Strickland
- Theme music composer: Richard DeBenedictis
- Country of origin: United States
- Original language: English
- No. of seasons: 1
- No. of episodes: 26

Production
- Executive producers: Martin Rips; Joseph Staretski
- Producers: Wendy Blair; Eric Cohen; Leonard Ripps
- Running time: 21 minutes
- Production companies: Ripstar Productions; Primetime Entertainment; Tribune Entertainment; Viacom Enterprises

Original release
- Network: First-run syndication
- Release: September 27, 1986 – May 23, 1987

What a Country! is an American sitcom starring Garrett M. Brown and Yakov Smirnoff that aired in first-run syndication from September 27, 1986, to May 23, 1987. The series is based on the British sitcom Mind Your Language and was intended as a showcase for Ukrainian-American comedian Yakov Smirnoff, whose catchphrase provided the show's title. Five years previously in 1981, an episode of sitcom Diff'rent Strokes titled "Almost American" had served as a backdoor pilot for a US version of Mind Your Language but it was not picked up for a series.

== Synopsis ==
What a Country! is set in a class of recent immigrants to the United States who are trying to pass the citizenship test. Their teacher, Taylor Brown (played by Garrett M. Brown), is a part-time substitute teacher looking for a high school soccer coaching job, while the students are:

1. Nikolai (a Russian-Soviet taxi driver),
2. Laszlo (a retired Hungarian doctor),
3. Ali (a Pakistani),
4. Robert (the son of a deposed African king),
5. Maria (a housekeeper working for a rich Beverly Hills family),
6. Victor (a Hispanic in love with Maria), and
7. Yung Hi (a shy Chinese woman).

Gail Strickland initially played the character of Principal Joan Courtney, though she was replaced by Don Knotts during the series' run.

== Cast ==
- Garrett M. Brown as Taylor Brown
- Yakov Smirnoff as Nikolai Rostopovich
- George Murdock as Laszlo Gabo
- Vijay Amritraj as Ali Nadim
- Harry Waters, Jr. as Robert Muboto
- Ada Maris as Maria Conchita Lopez
- Julian Reyes as Victor Ortega
- Leila Hee Olsen as Yung Hi
- Gail Strickland as Principal Joan Courtney (episodes 1–10)
- Don Knotts as Principal F.J. "Bud" McPherson (episodes 11–26)

== Episodes ==
No.	Title	Directed by	Written by	Original release date
1	"The First Class"	Howard Storm	Martin Rips & Joseph Staretski	September 27, 1986
Mr. Brown is a substitute teacher in a citizenship class at a night school, and has doubts about becoming an instructor.
2	"The Soul Man"	Russ Petranto	Lenny Ripps	October 4, 1986
The class convinces a reluctant Robert to ask a young woman out on a date. Nikolai helps Robert with some tips on how to become 'cool'.
3	"A Busboy Named Desire"	Howard Storm	Frank Mula & Mike Scully	October 11, 1986
Victor asks Maria out on a date to an expensive restaurant, but their dinner doesn't turn out as well as they had hoped.
4	"Don't Leave Home Without It"	Howard Storm	Eric Cohen	October 18, 1986
Nikolai discovers the joys of credit cards, until he experiences the sorrows of being in debt.
5	"My Fair Yung Hi"	Russ Petranto	Stephen Schneck	October 25, 1986
Mr. Brown starts private lessons with Yung Hi to overcome her shyness and improve her English pronunciation and diction, in order for her to feel comfortable participating in a debate in class.
6	"Holiday on Ice"	Linda Day	Frank Mula & Mike Scully	November 1, 1986
When Laszlo is convinced by Mr. Brown to come out of retirement and become a dentist again, he unfortunately finds himself in jail along with Robert, Maria and Nikolai.
7	"The Best Laid Plans"	Bob Claver	Nick Arnold	November 8, 1986
A field trip to Disneyland is planned for the class, until it falls apart when Nikolai is in charge of finances.
8	"Chicken a la Prince"	Unknown	Unknown	November 15, 1986
Bob and Nik are smitten by a Swedish woman who's joined their immigration class.
9	"A Birthday With Class"	Unknown	Unknown	November 22, 1986
The class orchestrates surprise birthday party plans for Taylor.
10	"Ali's Arrangement"	Unknown	Unknown	December 20, 1986
When he was 7 year-old, Ali's marriage was arranged, and now the time has come to fulfill his obligation.
11	"Taylor Loses His Cool"	Russ Petranto	Bernie West	January 10, 1987
Mr. Brown meets new principal Mr. McPherson. Upon learning that the principal does not like the way he teaches the class, Mr. Brown decides to quit.
12	"The Road From Morocco"	Dolores Ferraro	Frank Mula & Mike Scully	January 17, 1987
A new student from Morocco, Rajeeb, joins the class, but quickly finds himself at odds with his new classmates. However, when he faces the risk of deportation, the class comes together to help him out.
13	"Nikolai Speaks"	Russ Petranto	Michael Turner	January 24, 1987
Nikolai and Mr. McPherson become involved in a hit-and-run accident, and become witnesses at a trial in court.
14	"California Dreamin'"	Unknown	Unknown	February 7, 1987
We devolve into fantasy as class members share their dreams.
15	"Moonlighting"	Russ Petranto	Lenny Ripps	February 14, 1987
Maria decides to quit her job as a housekeeper for the Feldmans, but can only find a job as a part-time taxi dancer. She attempts to keep her new job a secret from her classmates. Meanwhile, Ali takes a job as Mr. McPherson's personal assistant.
16	"Play it Again, F"	Delores Ferraro	Norm Chandler Fox	February 21, 1987
Things get awkward for Mr. Brown when he finds out that his own mother and Mr. McPherson were once romantically involved.
17	"Citizen Pain"	Russ Petranto	George Yanok	February 28, 1987
Nikolai becomes increasingly paranoid, convinced that he is being watched and followed by KGB agents.
18	"Educating Inga"	Alan Bergmann	Martin Rips & Joseph Staretski	March 7, 1987
The guys in class become infatuated with a new student in the class, Inga, from Sweden. Nikolai, Robert, Victor and Ali try to teach her English so she can stay in the class.
19	"Victor at an Exhibition"	Russ Petranto	Frank Mula & Mike Scully	March 14, 1987
Maria meets a rich and handsome young man, Charles, who is an art gallery curator in Beverly Hills. However, a rift between her and Victor ensues after she takes on a few 'changes'.
20	"What a Tangled Web We Weave"	Bob Claver	Martin Rips & Joseph Staretski	March 28, 1987
Facing a risk of losing the class, the students aim to perform well on a test being set by Mr. McPherson.
21	"Love Finds Nikolai"	Bob Claver	Jerry Rannow	April 4, 1987
Nikolai reunites with a fellow Russian, Sonya. Although he wishes to date American girls, he realises that he is starting to fall in love with her.
22	"We're in the Muboto's"	Russ Petranto	Frank Mula & Mike Scully	April 11, 1987
Robert discovers that he will be inheriting millions of dollars from his family's wealth, but only if a certain condition is met.
23	"What Are Friends For?"	Russ Petranto	Lenny Ripps	May 2, 1987
Maria is selected to become a television spokesperson. However, her dreams of stardom collapse when she drinks too much of Yung Hi's grandmother's tea to overcome her cold.
24	"The Candidate"	Russ Petranto	Frank Mula & Mike Scully	May 9, 1987
The class volunteers to help out at a campaign of a local city council candidate, Alex Hernandez. Maria and Alex fall in love with each other, but Maria learns a harsh lesson about politics.
25	"The Apartment"	Tony Singletary	Martin Rips & Joseph Staretski	May 16, 1987
When Ali is refused an apartment even though it is listed as vacant, Mr. Brown and the students investigate why.
26	"Old World Charmer"	Howard Storm	Eric Cohen	May 23, 1987
Laszlo accompanies Miss Courtney to a social formal event. Meanwhile, the guys have poker night at Nikolai's apartment.
