= Jessica Caban =

American fashion model and actress (born 1982)

- Born: New York City, U.S.
- Occupations: Model; actress; fashion designer
- Partner: Derek Luh (2026-)
- Modeling information
- Height: 5 ft 4 in (1.63 m)
- Hair color: Brown
- Eye color: Brown

Jessica Caban is an American model, actress, and fashion designer. She was a contestant on Model Latina, where she was crowned the first ever Model Latina champion.

== Career ==
She began her career in 2002, after being chosen to represent Jennifer Lopez's line "J-LO" as a runner-up in a nationwide search. She was later featured in many commercials and magazines and landed the main role in Proyecto Uno's music video "Holla".

In 2009, Caban auditioned for Sí TV's new reality competition show, Model Latina, in which aspiring models compete against each other in fashion and cultural challenges; it was filmed in Los Angeles. Caban and Darlenis Duran competed in the season finale, where Caban has crowned Sí TV's first Model Latina. She was awarded a $10,000 contract with Q Management and was featured in spreads of magazines.

== Personal life ==
Caban began dating singer Bruno Mars in 2011. The couple lived in a mansion in the Hollywood Hills with a Rottweiler named Geronimo and she attended three Grammy Award ceremonies with him.

In summer 2026, Caban had announced her engagement to actor Derek Luh. She celebrated her bridal shower on November 1st, 2026. They officially married on November 13th, 2026.

== Filmography ==
Film
Year	Film	Role	Notes
2010	Are You for Great Sex?	Thea Gala Larson	Film debut
Television
Year	Title	Role	Notes
2008-2011	Model Latina	Herself	Season 1 winner
2016-2017	Jane the Virgin	Sonia	4 episodes

== Awards ==
Year	Group	Award	Result	Film/Show
2010	Boston International Film Festival	Best Acting Performance in a Feature Film	Won	Are You for Great Sex?
2010	Hoboken International Film Festival	Festival Award for Best Actress	Won	Are You for Great Sex?

First	Model Latina winner Cycle 1 (2008)	Succeeded by Codie Cabral
