= Franco Lacosta =

Puerto Rican television personality, producer and fashion designer

Franco Lacosta born in New York City, New York is a Puerto Rican television personality, writer, content creator, producer and fashion designer. He has worked with networks such as ABC, NBC, CWTV, Bravo, and NuvoTV. He is best known for his on-camera appearances for TV shows including America's Next Top Model, Model Latina, The Bachelor, and The Bachelorette. Lacosta's menswear designs are presented by New York Mercedes-Benz Fashion Week.

== Television ==
Franco's first on-camera appearance was WE's Style Me with model Rachel Hunter; a reality show where he competed as a stylist for the chance to win a contract and style Hunter for a red carpet event.

=== Model Latina ===
Franco was approached yet again, this time to create Model Latina, a reality TV completion, the format similar to America's Next Top Model. Franco was a content creator, as well as judge and photographer for the competition. Franco was a judge for all 5 seasons, and was regarded as one of Model Latina's most popular judges.

=== America's Next Top Model ===
Franco was hired by Tyra Banks for seasons 20 and 21 as a content creator and photographer. Franco was tasked with creating various challenges as well as photoshoot concepts and directing the commercial challenge portions.

=== The Bachelor Franchise ===
Franco served as a creative director, as well as the on-camera photographer for three seasons of The Bachelor. Franco's unique style and energy on camera led to various articles and social media posts written about him, including one very infamous romper. He has also appeared in two seasons of The Bachelorette.

== Fashion design ==
In 2013, Franco launched his namesake line, Franco Lacosta New York. His collections have been featured in various magazines and editorials such as W, GQ, Russian Vogue, Schon!, Playhous, Risbel, Male Model Scene, Desnudo, and others. He has made bespoke suits for several Broadway stars, including Tommy Tune and Adam Lambert. In 2017, he was named one of Elle's "10 Designers to Watch" during New York Fashion Week.

In addition to fashion design, Franco creates his own textiles. He is currently developing a line for home interiors, that includes wall coverings, rugs, and furniture.
