= Carlos Lacámara =

American actor

- Born: November 11, 1958 (age 67); Havana, Cuba
- Occupations: Actor, playwright
- Years active: 1982–present
- Height: 5 ft 9 in (175 cm)
- Spouse: Carol Barbee
- Children: 2

Carlos Lacámara (born November 11, 1958) is a Cuban-born American actor and playwright who has had a long career on American television, making his first appearance in 1983 on the sitcom Family Ties and mostly played in roles as Paco Ortíz on the sitcom Nurses, and as Ray García, the family patriarch on The Brothers García.

== Early life ==
Is of Euro-Indigenous Cuban descent. Lacámara was born in Havana, Cuba but moved to Washington, D.C. in 1960 because of the Cuban Revolution. After that, he moved to Puerto Rico, and then to California, where he resides now. He attended UCLA.

== Career ==
His recent guest roles have shifted from the early trend to cast him as a waiter, valet, or other entry level worker.

Although characters from Nurses occasionally appeared on Empty Nest, from which their show had originated, Lacámara's only appearance on Empty Nest was in an unrelated role in 1995, after Nurses had ended its run. Lacámara's role in The Brothers García reunited him with former Nurses co-star Ada Maris.

In 2006, Lacámara's play Nowhere on the Border won first place of Repertorio Español's, a theatre company in New York, MetLife Nuestras Voces National Playwriting Competition. The play was produced at Repertorio Español in the fall of 2007. His second play Havana Bourgeois won Reverie Productions' Next Generations Playwriting Contest, and was produced by Reverie at 59E59 Theaters in New York in 2007, and later played in Los Angeles, California and Coral Gables, FL.

Lacámara wrote the book and additional lyrics for the musical "Cuba Libre", which is first produced by Artists Repertory Theatre in Portland, Oregon in October 2015. This Broadway-scale, contemporary musical features the internationally acclaimed, three-time Grammy nominated band Tiempo Libre with a company of 21 actors, dancers and musicians.

== Filmography ==
Year	Title	Role	Notes
1982	Zapped!	Older Barney	
1983	Family Ties	Petey	Episode: "Stage Fright"
1987	Summer School	Beach Cop	
1988	License to Drive	Second Cop	
1990	Faith	Julio	
1991	Talkin' Dirty After Dark	Hispanic Worker	
1991	Ricochet	Luis	
1991-1994	Nurses	Paco Ortis	68 episodes
1995	Star Trek: Deep Space Nine	assassin Retaya	Episode: "Improbable Cause"
1996	Independence Day	Radar Operator	
1997	The Apocalypse	Captain Bryant	
1997	Beyond Belief: Fact or Fiction	Clergyman	Episode: Secret of the Family Tomb
1997 - 1998	Connect With English	Ramon Mendoza	Main character
1998	Friends	The A.D.	Episode: "The One with Joey's Dirty Day"
1999	10 Things I Hate About You	Bartender	
2000-2004	The Brothers García	Ray Garcia	45 episodes
2001	The Mexican	Mexican Car Rental Rep	
2005	The World's Fastest Indian	Cabbie	
2006-2007	Close to Home	Medical Examiner Schmidt	7 episodes
2007	National Lampoon's Bag Boy	Julio	
2009	Lie To Me	Inspector Mike Adams	Episode: "Unchained"
2009	Waiting for Ophelia	Union Honcho #2	
2010	Chuck	Juan Diego Arnaldo	Episode: "Chuck Versus the Honeymooners"
2013-2015	Mighty Med	Horace	34 episodes
2016	Major Crimes	Martin Borja	3 episodes
2017	Suits	Oscar Reyes	3 episodes
2020	Four Good Days	Dr. Ortiz	
2020	Holidate	Carly's Dad	
2022	The Garcias	Ray Garcia	Main Role; HBO Max series
2022	Barry	Mr. Coleman	Episode: "Crazytimesh*tshow"
2023	The Villains of Valley View	Sergio	Episode: "Vases, Volcanoes & the Green-Eyed Monster"
