= I Married Dora =

1987 American TV sitcom

- Genre: Sitcom
- Created by: Michael J. Leeson
- Written by: Chris Cluess; Stu Kreisman; Michael J. Leeson
- Directed by: Lee Shallat-Chemel; Peter H. Hunt
- Starring: Daniel Hugh Kelly; Elizabeth Peña; Juliette Lewis; Jason Horst
- Theme music composer: Glenn Jordan
- Country of origin: United States
- Original language: English
- No. of seasons: 1
- No. of episodes: 13

Production
- Executive producers: Michael J. Leeson; Coleman Mitchell
- Producers: Wendy Blair; Jace Richdale; Vic Rauseo; Linda Morris
- Running time: 22 mins.
- Production companies: Reeves Entertainment Group; Welladay Inc.

Original release
- Network: ABC
- Release: September 22, 1987 – January 8, 1988

I Married Dora is an American sitcom that aired on ABC from September 22, 1987, to January 8, 1988. It was created by Michael J. Leeson.

== Synopsis ==
Los Angeles architect and single father, Peter Farrell, was dependent upon his housekeeper, Dora Calderon. However, she was an illegal immigrant from El Salvador and the United States government's Immigration and Naturalization Service was about to deport her. To prevent her from being arrested upon her return home, and to be able to continue to employ her services as a housekeeper, the two married. As marriages under false pretenses were (and still are) violations of federal law, the first episode included a disclaimer notifying viewers of this fact and adding, "You should not try this in your own home."

Two important aspects of the stories were the threat of their sham marriage: being discovered by authorities and the possibility that they might fall in love, normalizing and legitimizing their marriage. Farrell's children were 13-year-old Kate and 11-year-old Will.

The opening titles and closing credits were filmed, but the episodes themselves were shot on videotape.

=== Series finale ===
The show had low ratings and was canceled halfway into its only season. The final episode ended with a scene breaking the fourth wall, that ranked number 49 on TVLand's list of The 100 Most Unexpected TV Moments. Peter received a two-year job offer in Bahrain and the final scene featured him boarding a plane headed overseas, leaving Dora and his children behind despite their pleas. A few moments later, Peter reappeared:

Peter: Hold on, hold on. Calm down here.

Dora (surprised): Mr. Peter?
Peter (looking at the airline ticket in his hand): It's been canceled.
Dora: The flight?

Peter (throwing the ticket over his shoulder): No, our series!

The cameras pulled back to show the entire stage as the cast and crew waved goodbye and performed curtain calls.

== Cast ==
- Daniel Hugh Kelly as Peter Farrell
- Elizabeth Peña as Dora Calderon
- Juliette Lewis as Kate Farrell
- Jason Horst as Will Farrell
- Sanford Jensen as Dolf Menninger
- Evelyn Guerrero as Marisol Calderon
- Henry Jones as Hughes Whitney Lennox

== Episode list ==
No.	Title	Original release date
1	"I Married Dora"	September 22, 1987
2	"My Parents Are Coming"	September 25, 1987
3	"Where There's a Will, There's No Way"	October 2, 1987
4	"Our Little Girl's Growing Up"	October 9, 1987
5	"God's Waiting Room"	October 16, 1987
6	"Happy, Happy Birthday, Dora"	October 30, 1987
7	"A Matter of Moulding"	November 6, 1987
8	"Club Montez"	November 13, 1987
9	"Dora Steps Out"	November 20, 1987
10	"West Coast Story"	November 27, 1987
11	"The Thirty-Five Year Itch"	December 11, 1987
12	"Guess Who's Coming to Dinner Forever?"	December 18, 1987
13	"The Millionaire's Club"	January 8, 1988

== Award nominations ==
Year	Award	Result	Category	Recipient
1988	Young Artist Award	Nominated	Best Young Actress Starring in a New Television Comedy Series	Juliette Lewis
1988	Young Artist Award	Nominated	Best Young Actor Starring in a New Television Comedy Series	Jason Horst
