= Christine Juarbe =

American actress

- Born: Christine Ann Juarbe; 1986 (age 39–40)
- Modeling information
- Height: 5 ft 7 in (1.70 m)
- Hair color: Black
- Eye color: Brown
- Agency: Q Management
- Website: Christine Juarbe on Myspace

Christine Ann Juarbe (born 1986) is an American fashion model, dancer and actress. She was the runner up on the 2nd cycle of Model Latina.

== Career ==
=== Modeling ===
In 2009, Juarbe auditioned for Sí TV's reality competition show, Model Latina: Miami, in which aspiring models compete against each other in fashion and cultural challenges. It was filmed in Miami, Florida. Juarbe and Codie Cabral competed in the season finale, where Juarbe was eliminated from the competition, finishing second overall.

Juarbe continued to model and signed with Q Management in Los Angeles. She has modeled for several ad campaigns as well as commercials for G-Unit, Pantene, Dove and MTV Tr3s.

In January 2010, Juarbe appeared in COED Magazine.
