= Model Latina =

Television series

- Presented by: Ellie Rodriguez (2008–2010); Jazmín López (2011); Jocelyn Pierce (2012)
- Judges: Jeffrey Kolsrud (2008–2012); Jorge Ramon (2008–2010); Franco Lacosta (2008–2012); Katrina Campins (2008); Jai Rodriguez (2009); Jennifer Gimenez (2009); Annette Rosario (2010); Alex Cambert (2011); Tomiko Fraser Hines (2011); Carlos Ponce (2012); Inés Rivero (2012)
- Country of origin: United States
- No. of seasons: 5
- No. of episodes: 62

Production
- Running time: 30 minutes (2012); 60 minutes (2008–2011)

Original release
- Network: NuvoTV
- Release: July 27, 2008 – July 23, 2012

Model Latina is an American reality competition show in which aspiring models compete against one another in fashion and cultural challenges. They are judged by a panel of fashion experts and celebrities from the American Latino entertainment industry. Model Latina is the first modeling competition of its kind to feature Latinas from all over the United States. The show airs on the cable network NuvoTV.

== Format ==
Each season of Model Latina has 10–13 episodes and begins with 10–20 contestants. Contestants are judged weekly on their overall appearance, participation in challenges, runway work and best shot from that week's photo shoot. In each episode, one contestant is eliminated from the competition, and in rare cases, a double elimination occurs.

NuvoTV has aired 5 installments of the Model Latina franchise, beginning with Model Latina, season 1 (or Model Latina: LA) in 2008. Each season has been filmed in a different location within the United States.

== Hosts and judges ==
The series employs a panel of judges who critique contestants' progress throughout the competition. Throughout its broadcast, the program has employed three different hosts and eleven different judges. Ellie Rodriguez was the show's host for seasons 1–3, and was replaced by Jazmín López for season 4 and by Jocelyn Pierce for season 5. The original judging panel consisted of Franco Lacosta, Jeffrey Kolsrud and Katrina Campins. For season 2, the original panel returned as guest judges with Jorge Ramon, Jai Rodriguez and Jennifer Gimenez as the main judges. Lacosta and Annette Rosario replaced Rodriguez and Gimenez for season 3 and Kolsrud served as the only guest judge. Tomiko Fraser Hines and Alex Cambert replaced Rosario and Ramon for season 4. For season 5, Carlos Ponce and Inés Rivero replaced Hines and Cambert.

Judge/Mentor	Season (Cycle) (Year)				
Judge/Mentor	1	2	3	4	5
Hosts
Ellie Rodriguez	Host	Host	Host		
Jazmín López				Host	
Jocelyn Pierce					Host
Judging Panelists
Franco Lacosta	Main	Guest	Main	Main	Main
Carlos Ponce					Main
Inés Rivero					Main
Tomiko Fraser Hines				Main	
Alex Cambert				Main	
Annette Rosario			Main		
Jorge Ramon		Main	Main		
Jai Rodriguez		Main			
Jennifer Gimenez		Main			
Jeffrey Kolsrud	Main	Guest	Guest	Guest	Guest
Katrina Campins	Main	Guest			

== Series overview ==
Season (Cycle)	Premiere date	Winner	Runner(s)-up	Other contestants in order of elimination	Number of contestants
1	27 July 2008	Jessica Caban	Darlenis Duran	Lulu Ramos, Leyicet Peralta, Sasha Cabrera, Belkys Galvez, Mishell Livio & Victoria Ortiz, Karina Florez, Linda Moreno	10
2	2 August 2009	Codie Cabral	Christine Juarbe	Yimarie Herrera & Sonia Miranda & Lisa Morales, Rebecca Hernandez, Jessica Rodriguez, Yanez Perez, Amanda Rodrigues & Carolina Arellano, Jocelyn Cruz, Leticia Castro, Emeraude Toubia, Melissa Gutierrez, Zuleyka Silver	15
3	2 August 2010	Elora Pérez	Jessica Santiago; Nashlly Sokoli	Carla Soto & Patricia Rosales, Paulina Malta, Victoria Sotelo (quit), Christina Giuseppe, Heidy Arizala, Yamile Mufdi, Jessica Ledon, Sally Ferreira, Erica Santos, Amanda David, Natalie Vértiz	15
4	15 August 2011	Erika Cavazos	Stephanie Pagan	Anisa Brooks & Olissa Brooks (quit), Jennifer Brea, Yolanda Robinson, Cecilia Howard, Ivet Fortun, Madeline Delgado, Natasha Pestano & Sacha García, Martii Figueroa, Lornalitz Báez, Sarah Lopez, Elizabeth Robaina, Mafe Quintero, Muriel Paton	17
5	28 May 2012	Muriel Villera	Marlene Cruz; Oneisys Amador	Brittany Peralta & Jillian Pacheco, Cindy Salaues & Maytee Martinez, Jacqueline Reyes & Maybelline Canela, Rachell Martell (disqualified)	10

== Model Latina: LA ==
Model Latina, season 1 (or Model Latina: LA) was the first season of Model Latina. It originally aired on NuvoTV from 27 July to 12 October 2008, and was hosted by Ellie Rodriguez. The judging panel consisted of photographer Franco Lacosta, Q Management's CEO Jeffrey Kolsrud and reality star Katrina Campins. The season was filmed in Los Angeles, California. The cycle's catchphrase was “Beauty is only the beginning.”

The winner of the competition was 25-year-old Jessica Caban from The Bronx, New York, emerging as Sí TV's (now NuvoTV) first ever Model Latina, with Darlenis Duran placing as runner-up. Caban's prizes were a modeling contract with Q Management, an editorial spreads in Latina magazine, an opportunity to be a Sí TV host, clothing from the Anna Fong Collection and a cash prize of US$10,000.

=== Contestants ===
Contestant	Age (Note: Ages stated are at the time of the contest.)	Height	Ethnicity	Hometown	Outcome	Place
Luissette "Lulu" Ramos	20	1.70 m (5 ft 7 in)	(Puerto Rico)	Miami, Florida	Episode 4	10
Leyicet Peralta	22	1.70 m (5 ft 7 in)	(Cuba) / (Peru)	Miami, Florida	Episode 5	9
Sasha Cabrera	19	1.68 m (5 ft 6 in)	(Puerto Rico) / (Peru)	Miami, Florida	Episode 6	8
Belkys Galvez	20	1.66 m (5 ft 5 1/2 in)	(Honduras)	Miami, Florida	Episode 7	7
Mishell Livio	20	1.73 m (5 ft 8 in)	(Italy) / (Spain) / (Mexico)	Tucson, Arizona	Episode 8	6-5
Victoria Ortiz	25	1.70 m (5 ft 7 in)	(Mexico)	New York City, New York	Episode 8	6-5
Karina Florez	26	1.76 m (5 ft 9 1/2 in)	(Colombia)	Miami, Florida	Episode 9	4
Linda Moreno	25	1.69 m (5 ft 6 1/2 in)	(Mexico)	Baldwin Park, California	Episode 10	3
Darlenis Duran	19	1.63 m (5 ft 4 in)	(Dominican Republic)	Brooklyn, New York	Episode 13	2
Jessica Caban	25	1.65 m (5 ft 5 in)	(Puerto Rico)	The Bronx, New York	Episode 13	1

=== Episodes ===
No. overall	No. in season	Title	Original release date
1	1	"On Call NYC"	July 27, 2008
2	2	"On Call Miami"	July 27, 2008
3	3	"On Call L.A."	August 3, 2008
4	4	"Ugly Beauty"	August 13, 2008
5	5	"Jessy's Girl"	August 13, 2008
6	6	"Frugal Fashionista"	August 24, 2008
7	7	"Booty Boutique"	August 31, 2008
8	8	"Kitchen Goddess"	September 7, 2008
9	9	"Mi Gente"	September 21, 2008
10	10	"Viva Latina"	September 28, 2008
11	11	"A Model Recap"	September 28, 2008
12	12	"Battle on the Catwalk"	October 5, 2008
13	13	"Curtain Call"	October 12, 2008

=== Results ===
Place	Model	Episodes								
Place	Model	3	4	5	6	7	8	9	10	13
1	Jessica	SAFE	SAFE	WIN	SAFE	LOW	SAFE	LOW	WIN	Winner
2	Darlenis	SAFE	SAFE	SAFE	LOW	SAFE	WIN	WIN	LOW	OUT
3	Linda	SAFE	SAFE	SAFE	SAFE	WIN	SAFE	SAFE	OUT	
4	Karina	SAFE	SAFE	SAFE	WIN	SAFE	SAFE	OUT		
6-5	Victoria	SAFE	LOW	SAFE	SAFE	SAFE	OUT			
6-5	Mishell	SAFE	WIN	LOW	SAFE	SAFE	OUT			
7	Belkys	SAFE	SAFE	LOW	SAFE	OUT				
8	Sasha	SAFE	LOW	SAFE	OUT					
9	Leyicet	SAFE	SAFE	OUT						
10	Lulu	SAFE	OUT							

The contestant won photo of the week
The contestant was in danger of elimination
The contestant was eliminated
The contestant won the competition

- Episodes 1, 2 and 3 were casting episodes. In episode 3, the pool of 20 semi-finalists was reduced to the 10 models who moved on to the main competition.
- In episode 8, Mishell and Victoria were called together as the bottom two and both were eliminated.
- Episode 11 was a recap episode.
- Episode 12 ended with a cliffhanger and continued in the following episode.

=== Challenges ===
- Episode 3 photo shoot: Natural posing (casting)
- Episode 4 photo shoots: Swimsuit; Make-under look
- Episode 5 music video: "Cover Girl" - Veze Skante
- Episode 6 photo shoot: Personal style for Payless
- Episode 7 photo shoot: Paige Premium Denim print campaign
- Episode 8 photo shoot: Candid photographs for restaurant advertisements
- Episode 9 commercial: Public service announcement for Voto Latino
- Episode 10 photo shoot: Magazine layouts for Latina
- Episode 13 fashion show: Fashion shows for Eduardo Lucero and Susana Mercedes (self-directed)

== Model Latina: Miami ==
Model Latina, season 2 (or Model Latina: Miami) was the second season of Model Latina. It originally aired on NuvoTV from 2 August to 18 October 2009, and was hosted by Ellie Rodriguez. The judging panel consisted of Jai Rodriguez, Jennifer Gimenez and Jorge Ramon. The season was filmed in Miami, Florida. The cycle's catchphrase was “Passion. Style. Sophistication.”

The winner of the competition was 21-year-old Codie Cabral from Murrieta, California, with Christine Juarbe placing as runner-up. Cabral's prizes were a modeling contract with Q Management and a cash prize of US$10,000.

=== Contestants ===
Contestant	Age (Note: Ages stated are at the time of the contest.)	Height	Ethnicity	Hometown	Outcome	Place
Sonia Miranda	22	1.75 m (5 ft 9 in)	(Nicaragua)	Miami, Florida	Episode 1	15-13
Lisa Morales	23	1.63 m (5 ft 4 in)	(Cuba)	Miami, Florida	Episode 1	15-13
Yimarie Herrera	25	1.65 m (5 ft 5 in)	(Puerto Rico)	Tampa, Florida	Episode 1	15-13
Rebecca Hernandez	20	1.65 m (5 ft 5 in)	(Mexico) / (Cuba)	Los Angeles, California	Episode 2	12
Jessica Rodriguez	21	1.68 m (5 ft 6 in)	(Cuba) / (Puerto Rico)	Miami, Florida	Episode 3	11
Yanez Perez	21	1.78 m (5 ft 10 in)	(Puerto Rico)	Philadelphia, Pennsylvania	Episode 4	10
Amanda Smith	22	1.68 m (5 ft 6 in)	(Brazil) / (Jamaica) / (Cricket West Indies) / (Cuba)	Baltimore, Maryland	Episode 5	9-8
Carolina Arellano	25	1.63 m (5 ft 4 in)	(Ecuador)	New York City, New York	Episode 5	9-8
Jocelyn Cruz	22	1.63 m (5 ft 4 in)	(Puerto Rico) / (Jamaica) / (Germany) / (Sweden)	Los Angeles, California	Episode 6	7
Leticia Castro	20	1.60 m (5 ft 3 in)	(Mexico)	Las Vegas, Nevada	Episode 7	6
Emeraude Toubia	20	1.65 m (5 ft 5 in)	(Mexico) / (Lebanon)	Brownsville, Texas	Episode 8	5
Melissa Gutierrez	22	1.73 m (5 ft 8 in)	(Basque Country (autonomous community)) / (Mexico)	San Diego, California	Episode 9	4
Zuleyka Silver	18	1.65 m (5 ft 5 in)	(Brazil) / (Puerto Rico) / (Mexico) / (Israel)	Los Angeles, California	Episode 10	3
Christine Juarbe	23	1.68 m (5 ft 6 in)	(Puerto Rico)	Queens, New York	Episode 13	2
Codie Cabral	21	1.75 m (5 ft 9 in)	(Mexico) / (Portugal)	Murrieta, California	Episode 13	1

=== Episodes ===
No. overall	No. in season	Title	Original release date
14	1	"Making the Cut"	August 2, 2009
15	2	"Sexy Swimsuits"	August 2, 2009
16	3	"Au Nauturel"	August 9, 2009
17	4	"Mama's Girl"	August 16, 2009
18	5	"Passion Play"	August 29, 2009
19	6	"Epic Models"	August 30, 2009
20	7	"Model Exposure"	September 6, 2009
21	8	"Seaside Strut"	September 13, 2009
22	9	"Viral Vixens"	September 20, 2009
23	10	"Brand Me"	September 27, 2009
24	11	"Be Kind, Rewind"	October 4, 2009
25	12	"Rock the Runway - Part I"	October 11, 2009
26	13	"Rock the Runway - Part II"	October 18, 2009

=== Results ===
Place	Model	Episodes										
Place	Model	1	2	3	4	5	6	7	8	9	10	13
1	Codie	SAFE	SAFE	WIN	SAFE	SAFE	SAFE	LOW	WIN	LOW	LOW	Winner
2	Christine	SAFE	WIN	SAFE	SAFE	LOW	LOW	WIN	LOW	WIN	WIN	OUT
3	Zuleyka	SAFE	SAFE	SAFE	WIN	WIN	LOW	SAFE	SAFE	LOW	OUT	
4	Melissa	SAFE	SAFE	SAFE	LOW	SAFE	SAFE	LOW	SAFE	OUT		
5	Emeraude	SAFE	SAFE	SAFE	SAFE	SAFE	SAFE	WIN	OUT			
6	Leticia	SAFE	SAFE	SAFE	SAFE	SAFE	WIN	OUT				
7	Jocelyn	SAFE	SAFE	SAFE	SAFE	SAFE	OUT					
9-8	Carolina	SAFE	SAFE	SAFE	SAFE	OUT						
9-8	Amanda	SAFE	SAFE	LOW	SAFE	OUT						
10	Yanez	SAFE	SAFE	LOW	OUT							
11	Jessica	SAFE	LOW	OUT								
12	Rebecca	SAFE	OUT									
15-13	Yimarie	OUT										
15-13	Lisa	OUT										
15-13	Sonia	OUT										

The contestant won photo of the week
The contestant was in danger of elimination
The contestant was eliminated
The contestant won the competition

- In episode 1, after their first photoshoot, the models were secretly judged by guest judge Jeffrey Kolsrud from Q Management. As a result, when they arrived to the model's house, Ellie announced that Yimarie, Lisa and Sonia have been eliminated.
- Episode 11 was a recap episode.
- Episode 12 ended with a cliffhanger and continued in the following episode.

=== Challenges ===
- Episode 1 photo shoot: Promo shoot
- Episode 2 photo shoot: Nicolita swimsuits in the pool
- Episode 3 photo shoot: Jungle runway
- Episode 4 photo shoot: Mirror image of their mothers
- Episode 5 photo shoot: Telenovelas emotions with Alfonso de Anda
- Episode 6 photo shoot: Epic Hotel's brochure
- Episode 7 photo shoot: Verizon Wireless billboard advertisement in pairs
- Episode 8 photo shoot: Runway island girl for Liza + Tara
- Episode 9 commercial: Orbit Mist hydrating gum
- Episode 10 photo shoot: Compcard
- Episode 13 fashion show: Fashion show for Anel Verna (self-directed)

== Model Latina: NYC ==
Model Latina, season 3 (or Model Latina: NYC) was the third season of Model Latina. It originally aired on NuvoTV from 2 August to 25 October 2010, and was hosted by Ellie Rodriguez. The judging panel consisted of Jorge Ramon, Franco Lacosta and new judge Annette Rosario. Online castings took place on March 15, 2010. The season was filmed in New York City, New York. The cycle's catchphrase was “Competition Beyond the Runway.”

The winner of the competition was 20-year-old Elora Pérez from Queens, New York, with Jessica Santiago and Nashlly Sokoli both placing as runners-up. Pérez's prizes were a modeling contract with Q Management, an opportunity to be a Sí TV host and a cash prize of US$25,000.

=== Contestants ===
Contestant	Age (Note: Ages stated are at the time of the contest)	Height	Ethnicity	Hometown	Outcome	Place
Carla Soto	23	1.70 m (5 ft 7 in)	(Mexico)	Perrysburg, Ohio	Episode 1	15-14
Patricia Rosales	24	1.75 m (5 ft 9 in)	(Cuba)	Miami, Florida	Episode 1	15-14
Paulina Malta	22	1.65 m (5 ft 5 in)	(Mexico)	Van Nuys, California	Episode 2	13
Victoria Sotelo	22	1.75 m (5 ft 9 in)	(Mexico) / (Spain) / (Hungary) / (Austria)	Whittier, California	Episode 3	12 (quit)
Christina Giuseppe	26	1.70 m (5 ft 7 in)	(Ecuador) / (Mexico) / (Italy) / (France)	Los Angeles, California	Episode 3	11
Heidy Arizala	21	1.75 m (5 ft 9 in)	(Colombia)	Orlando, Florida	Episode 4	10
Yamile "Yami" Mufdi	24	1.78 m (5 ft 10 in)	(Dominican Republic) / (Palestine)	Miami, Florida	Episode 5	9
Jessica Ledon	19	1.68 m (5 ft 6 in)	(Cuba)	Miami, Florida	Episode 6	8
Sally Ferreira	25	1.65 m (5 ft 5 in)	(Dominican Republic)	Queens, New York	Episode 7	7
Erica Santos	21	1.80 m (5 ft 11 in)	(Puerto Rico)	Manchester, Connecticut	Episode 8	6
Amanda David	20	1.70 m (5 ft 7 in)	(Puerto Rico)	Waterbury, Connecticut	Episode 9	5
Natalie Vértiz	18	1.83 m (6 ft 0 in)	(Peru)	Pompano Beach, Florida	Episode 10	4
Jessica Santiago	20	1.78 m (5 ft 10 in)	(Puerto Rico)	Tampa, Florida	Episode 13	3-2
Nashlly Sokoli	20	1.70 m (5 ft 7 in)	(Ecuador) / (Lebanon)	Newark, New Jersey	Episode 13	3-2
Elora Pérez	20	1.75 m (5 ft 9 in)	(Dominican Republic) / (Puerto Rico) / (Panama)	Queens, New York	Episode 13	1

=== Episodes ===
No. overall	No. in season	Title	Original release date
27	1	"Model Mayhem"	August 2, 2010
28	2	"Flesh & the City"	August 9, 2010
29	3	"Concrete Jungle"	August 16, 2010
30	4	"Mobile Vixens"	August 23, 2010
31	5	"Catwalk Chaos"	August 30, 2010
32	6	"Down 'n Dirty"	September 6, 2010
33	7	"Eye Candy"	September 13, 2010
34	8	"Urban Elegance"	September 20, 2010
35	9	"Two to Tango"	September 27, 2010
36	10	"Final 4 Fiesta"	October 4, 2010
37	11	"Model Retake"	October 11, 2010
38	12	"Fab Fuerza Girls"	October 18, 2010
39	13	"Runway Showdown"	October 25, 2010

=== Results ===
Place	Model	Episodes											
Place	Model	1	2	3	4	5	6	7	8	9	10	12	13
1	Elora	SAFE	SAFE	SAFE	LOW	SAFE	SAFE	SAFE	SAFE	WIN	LOW	WIN	Winner
3-2	Jessica S.	SAFE	SAFE	SAFE	WIN	SAFE	SAFE	LOW	SAFE	SAFE	LOW	LOW	OUT
3-2	Nashlly	SAFE	SAFE	WIN	LOW	SAFE	LOW	WIN	LOW	SAFE	WIN	OUT	OUT
4	Natalie	SAFE	SAFE	LOW	SAFE	WIN	SAFE	SAFE	WIN	LOW	OUT		
5	Amanda	SAFE	WIN	SAFE	SAFE	LOW	WIN	SAFE	SAFE	OUT			
6	Erica	SAFE	SAFE	LOW	SAFE	WIN	SAFE	LOW	OUT				
7	Sally	SAFE	SAFE	SAFE	SAFE	LOW	LOW	OUT					
8	Jessica L.	SAFE	SAFE	SAFE	SAFE	SAFE	OUT						
9	Yami	OUT		SAFE	SAFE	OUT							
10	Heidy	SAFE	SAFE	SAFE	OUT								
11	Christina	SAFE	LOW	OUT									
12	Victoria	SAFE	LOW	QUIT									
13	Paulina	SAFE	OUT										
15-14	Patricia	OUT											
15-14	Carla	OUT											

The contestant won photo of the week
The contestant was in danger of elimination
The contestant was eliminated
The contestant was originally eliminated, but was saved
The contestant quit the competition
The contestant won the competition

- In episode 1, after their first and second photoshoot, the models were secretly judged by guest judge Jeffrey Kolsrud from Q Management. As a result, when they arrived to the model's house, Ellie announced that Carla, Yami and Patricia have been eliminated.
- In episode 3, Victoria quit the competition. As a result, Yami, who was eliminated in episode 1, was chosen to return to the competition.
- Episode 11 was a recap episode.

=== Challenges ===
- Episode 1 photo shoot: Promo shoot
- Episode 2 photo shoot: Nicolita bikini on a bus
- Episode 3 photo shoot: Concrete jungle warrior in Harlem
- Episode 4 commercial: Verizon in groups
- Episode 5 photo shoot: Bloomingdale's fashion show
- Episode 6 photo shoot: Orbit's street cleanup
- Episode 7 commercial: Nationwide in close-up
- Episode 8 photo shoot: High fashion at the Brooklyn Bridge
- Episode 9 photo shoot: Dance genres with male dancer
- Episode 10 photo shoot: Alter-ego for Ford Fiesta
- Episode 12 photo shoot: Fuerza Bruta
- Episode 13 photo shoot & fashion show: Mother and daughter; Fashion show for Hernan Lander

== Model Latina: Las Vegas ==
Model Latina, season 4 (or Model Latina: Las Vegas) was the fourth season of Model Latina. It originally aired on NuvoTV from 15 August to 24 October 2011, and was hosted by Jazmín López (replacing Ellie Rodriguez). The judging panel consisted of Franco Lacosta and 2 new judges Alex Cambert and Tomiko Fraser Hines. The season was filmed in Las Vegas, Nevada. The cycle's catchphrase was “Bigger. Brighter. Bolder.”

The winner of the competition was 25-year-old Erika Marie Cavazos from Weslaco, Texas, with Stephanie Pagan placing as runner-up. Cavazos's prizes were a modeling contract with Q Management, an opportunity to be a NuvoTV host and a cash prize of US$20,000.

=== Contestants ===
Contestant	Age (Note: Ages stated are at the time of the contest.)	Height	Ethnicity	Hometown	Outcome	Place
Anisa Brooks	28	1.65 m (5 ft 5 in)	(Paraguay)	Los Angeles, California	Episode 1	17-16 (quit)
Olissa Brooks	28	1.65 m (5 ft 5 in)	(Paraguay)	Los Angeles, California	Episode 1	17-16 (quit)
Jennifer Brea	23	1.73 m (5 ft 8 in)	(Dominican Republic)	Allentown, Pennsylvania	Episode 1	15
Yolanda Robinson	23	1.73 m (5 ft 8 in)	(Mexico)	Dallas, Texas	Episode 2	14
Cecilia "Ceci" Howard	27	1.58 m (5 ft 2 in)	(Uruguay)	Las Vegas, Nevada	Episode 3	13
Ivet Fortun	28	1.70 m (5 ft 7 in)	(Cuba)	Los Angeles, California	Episode 4	12
Madeline Delgado	24	1.78 m (5 ft 10 in)	(Puerto Rico)	San Juan, Puerto Rico	Episode 5	11
Natasha Pestano	24	1.70 m (5 ft 7 in)	(Portugal) / (Republic of Ireland) / (India)	Miami, Florida	Episode 6	10-9
Sacha García	28	1.78 m (5 ft 10 in)	(Puerto Rico)	San Juan, Puerto Rico	Episode 6	10-9
Martii Figueroa	26	1.63 m (5 ft 4 in)	(Mexico)	Burbank, California	Episode 7	8
Lorna "Lornalitz" Báez	28	1.75 m (5 ft 9 in)	(Puerto Rico)	Astoria, New York	Episode 9	7
Sarah Lopez	22	1.65 m (5 ft 5 in)	(Mexico)	Las Vegas, Nevada	Episode 10	6
Elizabeth Robaina	22	1.60 m (5 ft 3 in)	(Cuba)	Los Angeles, California	Episode 11	5
Maria "Mafe" Quintero	24	1.73 m (5 ft 8 in)	(Colombia)	Miami, Florida	Episode 12	4
Muriel Paton	23	1.73 m (5 ft 8 in)	(Dominican Republic) / (Brazil)	Jersey City, New Jersey	Episode 13	3
Stephanie Pagan	22	1.70 m (5 ft 7 in)	(Puerto Rico) / (Italy) / (France) / (Germany)	San Juan, Puerto Rico	Episode 13	2
Erika Cavazos	25	1.75 m (5 ft 9 in)	(Mexico)	Weslaco, Texas	Episode 13	1

=== Episodes ===
No. overall	No. in season	Title	Original release date
40	1	"Luck Be a Lady"	August 15, 2011
41	2	"Skin City"	August 15, 2011
42	3	"Red Hot Pin Up"	August 22, 2011
43	4	"Vegas Strip"	August 29, 2011
44	5	"Knockout Hottie"	September 5, 2011
45	6	"Pole Dance Off"	September 12, 2011
46	7	"Sexy Cirque Girl"	September 19, 2011
47	8	"Chew on This"	September 26, 2011
48	9	"Seven Sinful Latinas"	October 3, 2011
49	10	"Up, Up & Away"	October 10, 2011
50	11	"Sin City Thrills"	October 17, 2011
51	12	"Groovy, Baby!"	October 24, 2011
52	13	"The Winner Is..."	October 24, 2011

=== Results ===
Place	Model	Episodes													
Place	Model	1	2	3	4	5	6	7	8	9	10	11	12	13	
1	Erika	SAFE	SAFE	SAFE	SAFE	LOW	SAFE	SAFE	SAFE	SAFE	LOW	WIN	LOW	LOW	Winner
2	Stephanie	SAFE	SAFE	SAFE	SAFE	SAFE	SAFE	WIN	SAFE	SAFE	SAFE	LOW	WIN	SAFE	OUT
3	Muriel	SAFE	SAFE	LOW	SAFE	SAFE	SAFE	WIN	WIN	LOW	WIN	SAFE	LOW	OUT	
4	Mafe	SAFE	SAFE	SAFE	SAFE	SAFE	SAFE	LOW	LOW	WIN	SAFE	SAFE	OUT		
5	Elizabeth	SAFE	SAFE	WIN	SAFE	SAFE	WIN	SAFE	LOW	SAFE	LOW	OUT			
6	Sarah	SAFE	WIN	SAFE	WIN	SAFE	LOW	SAFE	SAFE	SAFE	OUT				
7	Lornalitz	SAFE	SAFE	SAFE	LOW	SAFE	SAFE	LOW	OUT	OUT					
8	Martii	SAFE	SAFE	SAFE	SAFE	WIN	SAFE	OUT							
10-9	Natasha	SAFE	LOW	SAFE	SAFE	LOW	OUT								
10-9	Sacha	SAFE	SAFE	SAFE	SAFE	SAFE	OUT								
11	Madeline	SAFE	SAFE	SAFE	LOW	OUT									
12	Ivet	SAFE	LOW	LOW	OUT										
13	Ceci	LOW	SAFE	OUT											
14	Yolanda	LOW	OUT												
15	Jennifer	OUT													
17-16	Anissa	QUIT													
17-16	Olissa	QUIT													

The contestant won photo of the week
The contestant was in danger of elimination
The contestant was eliminated
The contestant was originally eliminated, but was saved
The contestant won the competition

=== Challenges ===
- Episode 1 photo shoot: Burlesque at the pool
- Episode 2 photo shoot: Nude beauty shots with shadows
- Episode 3 photo shoot: 1940's inspired Pin-ups
- Episode 4 photo shoot: Snakes & Tigers
- Episode 5 photo shoot: Ring Girls
- Episode 6 photo shoot: Same-sex newlyweds for Beautiful Bride magazine
- Episode 7 photo shoot: Zumanity showgirls
- Episode 8 photo shoot & commercial: Posing on a white dress with recycled accessories from Orbitz
- Episode 9 photo shoot: 7 Deadly Sins on the desert
- Episode 10 photo shoot: Editorial at the Grand Canyon
- Episode 11 photo shoot: Glamour woman at The Strat for Verizon
- Episode 12 photo shoot: 1970's retro shoot for Latina magazine
- Episode 13 photo shoot, commercial & fashion show: Showgirls of Moulin Rouge; InStyler Rotating Iron commercial; Fashion show for Roberto de Villacis

== Model Latina: South Beach ==
Model Latina, season 5 (or Model Latina: South Beach) was the fifth season of Model Latina. It originally aired on NuvoTV from 28 May to 23 July 2012, and was hosted by Jocelyn Pierce (replacing Jazmín López). The judging panel consisted of Franco Lacosta and new judges Carlos Ponce and Inés Rivero. The season was filmed in Miami Beach, Florida. This was the first season of Model Latina to include only 10 contestants and air fewer than 13 episodes. The season's 10 episodes were broadcast over a nine-week span. Each episode was shortened from the previous 60 minutes to 30.

The winner of the competition was 21-year-old Muriel Villera from Hialeah, Florida, with Marlene Cruz and Oneisys Amador placing as runners-up. Villera's prizes were a modeling contract with Q Management and a cash prize of US$25,000.

=== Contestants ===
Contestant	Age (Note: Ages stated are at the time of the contest.)	Height	Ethnicity	Hometown	Outcome	Place
Jillian Pacheco	18	1.73 m (5 ft 8 in)	(Puerto Rico)	New York City, New York	Episode 3	10-9
Brittany Peralta	22	1.68 m (5 ft 6 in)	(Mexico)	Las Cruces, New Mexico	Episode 3	10-9
Maytee Martinez	20	1.80 m (5 ft 11 in)	(Cuba)	Pembroke Pines, Florida	Episode 5	8-7
Cindy Salaues	23	1.73 m (5 ft 8 in)	(Guatemala) / (Bolivia)	Canyon Country, California	Episode 5	8-7
Maybelline Canela	21	1.75 m (5 ft 9 in)	(Dominican Republic)	The Bronx, New York	Episode 6	6-5
Jacqueline Reyes	25	1.78 m (5 ft 10 in)	(Dominican Republic)	Queens, New York	Episode 6	6-5
Rachell Martell	20	1.78 m (5 ft 10 in)	(Cuba) / (Italy)	Miami, Florida	Episode 9	4 (DQ)
Marlene García	21	1.70 m (5 ft 7 in)	(Puerto Rico)	Patillas, Puerto Rico	Episode 10	3-2
Oneisys Amador	26	1.73 m (5 ft 8 in)	(Cuba)	Miami, Florida	Episode 10	3-2
Muriel Villera	21	1.73 m (5 ft 8 in)	(Colombia)	Hialeah, Florida	Episode 10	1

=== Episodes ===
No. overall	No. in season	Title	Original release date
53	1	"Stripped"	May 28, 2012
54	2	"Wet and Wild"	May 28, 2012
55	3	"Badass Latinas"	June 4, 2012
56	4	"Lusty Lingerie"	June 11, 2012
57	5	"Deep Sea Drama"	June 18, 2012
58	6	"Vintage Vixens"	June 25, 2012
59	7	"Models Gone Wild"	July 2, 2012
60	8	"Girl II Goddess"	July 9, 2012
61	9	"Beach Beauty"	July 16, 2012
62	10	"Wild Style"	July 23, 2012

=== Results ===
Place	Model	Episodes									
Place	Model	1	2	3	4	5	6	7	8	9	10
1	Muriel	WIN	SAFE	LOW	SAFE	WIN	SAFE	SAFE	WIN	SAFE	Winner
3-2	Marlene	SAFE	SAFE	SAFE	WIN	SAFE	SAFE	WIN	SAFE	WIN	OUT
3-2	Oneisys	SAFE	LOW	SAFE	WIN	SAFE	WIN	SAFE	OUT	LOW	OUT
4	Rachell	LOW	WIN	WIN	SAFE	SAFE	SAFE	SAFE	LOW	DQ	
6-5	Jacqueline	SAFE	SAFE	SAFE	LOW	LOW	OUT				
6-5	Maybelline	SAFE	LOW	WIN	LOW	SAFE	OUT				
8-7	Cindy	SAFE	SAFE	SAFE	SAFE	OUT					
8-7	Maytee	OUT	SAFE	LOW	OUT	OUT					
10-9	Brittany	SAFE	SAFE	OUT							
10-9	Jillian	SAFE	SAFE	OUT							

The contestant won photo of the week
The contestant was in danger of elimination
The contestant was disqualified from the competition
The contestant was eliminated
The contestant was originally eliminated, but was saved
The contestant won the competition

- Episode 8 ended with a cliffhanger and continued in the following episode.
- Episode 9 ended with a cliffhanger and continued in the following episode. On the beginning of episode 10, Rachell was disqualified for not followed the requirement to terminate all prior modelling contracts before competing on the show.

=== Challenges ===
- Episode 1 fashion show: Self-styled runway
- Episode 2 photo shoot: Underwater swimsuit with dolphins
- Episode 3 photo shoot: Action-packed shoot in pairs
- Episode 4 photo shoot: Lingerie
- Episode 5 photo shoot: Luxury in the yacht with Carlos Ponce
- Episode 6 photo shoot: High-fashion sophisticated woman in Vizcaya villa
- Episode 7 commercial: Nissan Zero Emission car in one-take
- Episode 8 photo shoot: Goddesses of Speed for Verizon
- Episode 9 photo shoot: Jewelry at the beach
- Episode 10 fashion show: Fashion show for Juan Colón

== Sponsors ==
For season 1, Hewlett-Packard and Southwest Airlines were the commercial sponsors. Verizon Wireless, Fuze and Wrigley were series sponsors for season 2. The series sponsors for season 3 were Verizon Wireless, Bloomingdale's and Orbitz. For season 4, Verizon Wireless and Orbit provided sponsorship. Verizon Wireless and Revlon were series sponsors for season 5.
