= Vaneza Pitynski =

American actress

- Born: Whittier, California, U.S.
- Occupations: Actress, singer, voice actress, fashion blogger, digital manager
- Years active: 1998–present
- Website: instagram.com/vaneza

Vaneza Pitynski (born in Whittier, California, USA) is an American actress, singer, voice actress, fashion blogger, and digital manager. She has played the role of Lorena Garcia in Nickelodeon's The Brothers Garcia and Skye in Fatherhood.

== Life and career ==
In 2001, Pitynski released her only album, Mr. Guapo through DDP Music when she was twelve years old and was also met with positive reviews from critics. Pitynski reprised her role as Lorena Garcia one last time in The Brothers Garcia: Mysteries of the Maya. She released a CD single in 2003 for All I Wanna Do is Dance. She took a break acting in 2005 having begun professionally in 1998. She graduated from high school in 2006 and then attended college at the University of Southern California from 2006 to 2010, majoring in theater. She is a former fashion blogger and digital manager.

In 2021, Pitynski returned to acting in the spin off of The Brothers Garcia titled The Garcias. The series aired on HBO Max. The Garcias will be produced by series writer Jeff Valdez. The Garcias premiered on April 14, 2022.

== Filmography ==
- True Friends (1998) – Young Angela
- The Brothers Garcia (2000 - 2004) – Lorena Garcia
- Megiddo: The Omega Code 2 (2001) – Girl in the church
- The Brothers Garcia: Mysteries of the Maya (2003) - Lorena Garcia
- Fatherhood (2004) – Skye (voice)
- Rodney (2005) – Valerie
- The Garcias (2022) - Lorena Garcia Ramirez

== Albums ==
- "Mr. Guapo" (August 3, 2001)

== CD singles ==
- "Friends Forever" featured in The Brothers Garcia: Mysteries of the Maya (2003)
- "All I Wanna Do is Dance" (2003)
