= Tomiko Fraser =

American fashion model and actress

Tomiko Fraser Hines
- Born: Tomiko Fraser; May 2, 1968 (age 58); Bronx, New York, United States
- Spouse: Christopher Hines (m. 2006)
- Children: 2
- Modeling information
- Height: 5 ft 9 in (1.75 m)
- Hair color: Brown
- Eye color: Brown
- Agency: Cathy Quinn Models New York, Models 1 London
- Website: www.tomikofraserhines.com

Tomiko Fraser Hines (née Fraser, born May 2, 1968) is an American fashion model and actress. She has done runway, print, and commercial modelling. Fraser is best known for being the first African-American face of Maybelline, which she was from 2001 to 2007. She starred in the 2001 movie Head over Heels. She is an advocate for lupus erythematosus awareness.

== Early life ==
Fraser was born and raised in Bronx, New York. Fraser attended Cardinal Spellman High School. Fraser aspired to be a school teacher because of her love of learning. Her parents divorced when she was a child. She is 1 of seven children: she has 3 maternal siblings and 4 paternal siblings.

Her brother Terrell Fraser is a DJ. Her sister Shneequa died of brain Lupus. Her aunt died of scleroderma, a rare autoimmune disease.

== Career ==
=== Modeling ===
Fraser started modeling at a later age than is typical of most fashion models. She was discovered by a modeling scout at 25 while working as a waitress at Flatiron District restaurant Lola. She stayed with the small agency for six months and her first modeling job was for Seventeen Magazine. She later signed to Ford Models and she walked the Chanel runway in Paris. Since then, she has appeared in numerous commercial and print campaigns including Essence (magazine),Target, Gain, Honey Nut Cheerios, Gemey. Her fashion campaigns include Alfani shoes, Gap, Tommy Hilfiger, J.Crew, Talbots, Liz Claiborne, Old Navy maternity.

Fraser is most known for being the face of Maybelline cosmetics. She was the first African-American model to represent the brand.

Fraser has worked Chloe, Chanel, Vera Wang, John Galliano, Nicole Miller, Vivienne Westwood and Emmanuel Ungaro runway shows. Photographer Mario Testino has photographed Fraser for US Vogue. She has also appeared on the cover of Flare in 1999.

In 2012, while pregnant, she modeled for Old Navy. and Stork magazine She spent a majority of her career with Ford Models; but is currently represented by Cathy Quinn Models in New York.

=== Acting ===
After years of modeling, Fraser turned her focus to acting. She is represented by Innovative Artists, and currently resides in Los Angeles with her husband.

Fraser's first role was in Head over Heels with Freddie Prinze Jr. in which she portrayed a fashion model. Since then, she has appeared on CSI: Crime Scene Investigation, Soul Food, The Game, and the feature film Monster-in-Law.

In 2011, Fraser became a judge on Model Latina: Las Vegas.

== Personal life ==
On July 3, 2006, Fraser married Christopher Hines. After years of fertility struggles, the couple used donor eggs and in vitro to conceive. In January 2013, Fraser gave birth to twins Kaden James Hines and Bryce Harrison Hines.

== Philanthropy ==
Fraser is also known as a Lupus Activist. The cause is near and dear to her heart as her sister Shneequa suffered from the disease. Fraser is a member of the Lupus Foundation of America (LFA) National Board of Directors.
