= Yakov Smirnoff =

Ukrainian-American comedian (born 1951)

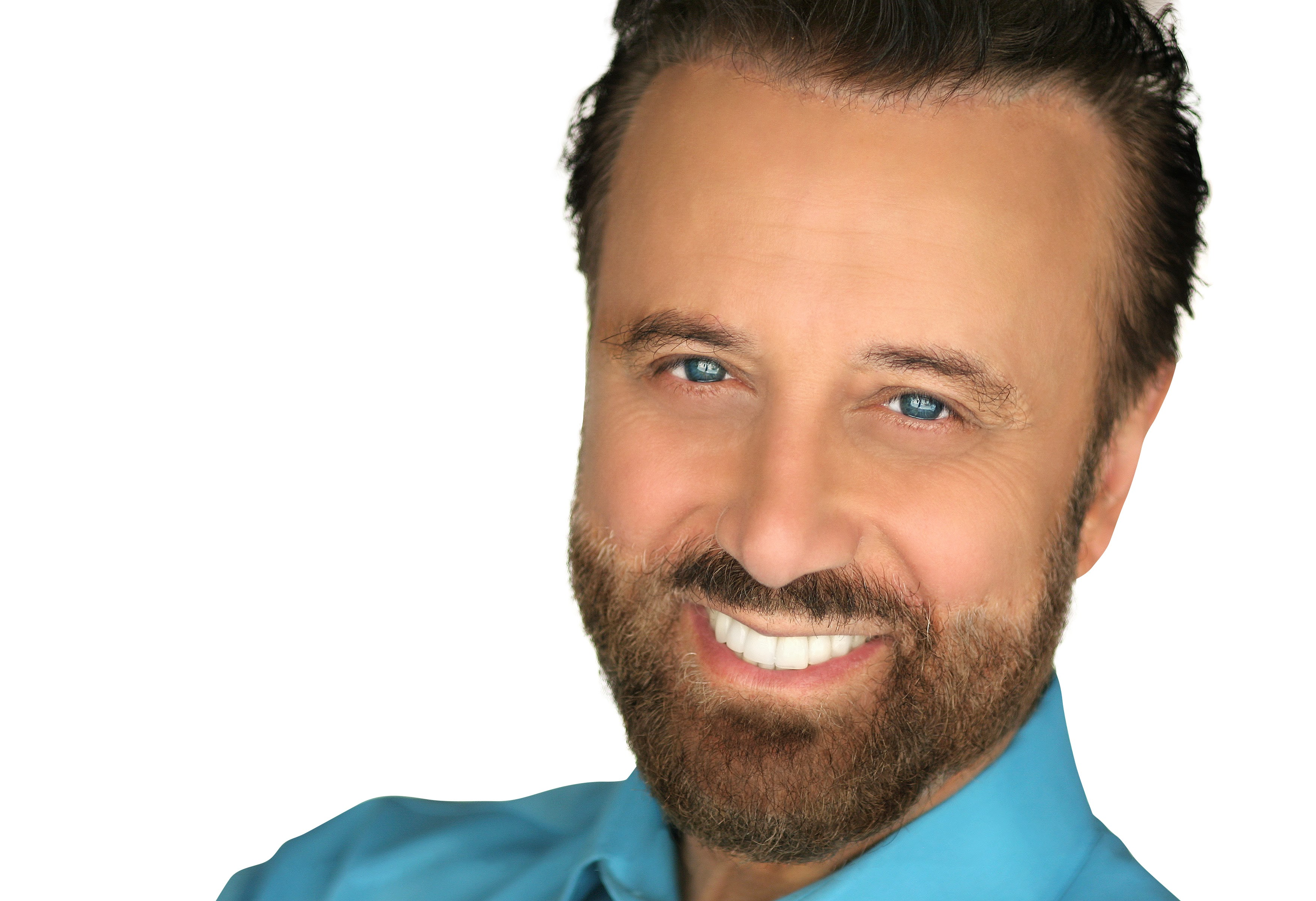
- Smirnoff in a promotional image
- Born: Yakov Naumovich Pokhis; 24 January 1951 (age 75); Odesa, Ukrainian SSR, Soviet Union
- Education: University of Pennsylvania, (MA); Pepperdine University, (PsyD)
- Notable work: Yakov on Night Court; Nikolai on What a Country!; Shatov in The Money Pit
- Spouses: Linda Dreeszen (m. 1989; div. 2001); Olivia Kosarieva (m. 2019)
- Children: 3

Comedy career
- Years active: 1983–present
- Medium: Stand-up; television; art; books
- Genres: Relationship humor; irony; word play; transpositional pun
- Subjects: Psychology; Russian-American culture; race relations; relationships; immigration; Communism in the Soviet Union
- Website: yakov.com

Yakov Naumovich Pokhis (Russian: Яков Наумович Похис; born 24 January 1951), better known as Yakov Smirnoff (Russian: Яков Смирнов; /ˈsmɪərnɒf/), is an American comedian, actor and writer. He began his career as a stand-up comedian in the Soviet Union, then immigrated to the United States in 1977 in order to pursue an American show business career, not yet knowing any English.

He reached his biggest success in the mid-to-late 1980s, appearing in several films which include Moscow on the Hudson with Robin Williams, The Money Pit with Tom Hanks, Heartburn with Jack Nicholson and Meryl Streep, and Brewster's Millions with Richard Pryor. He was a star of the television series What a Country! and was a recurring guest star on NBC's hit television series Night Court playing the part of Yakov Korolenko. His comic persona was of a naive immigrant from the Soviet Union who was perpetually confused and delighted by life in the United States. His humor combined a mockery of both life in the Soviet Union and its satellites, and of capitalist consumerism in the United States, as well as word play caused by misunderstanding of American phrases and culture, all punctuated by the catchphrase, "And I thought, 'What a country!'"

Following the dissolution of the Soviet Union in 1991, he continued to perform. In 1993, he began performing year round at his own theater in Branson, Missouri. As of 2024, he occasionally still performs limited dates at his theater in Branson while touring worldwide. Smirnoff earned a master's degree in psychology from the University of Pennsylvania in 2006 and a doctorate in psychology and global leadership from Pepperdine University in 2019. He has also taught a course titled "The Business of Laughter" at Missouri State University and at Drury University.

== Early life ==
The son of Naum Pokhis and Klara Pokhis, Smirnoff was born in Odesa in the Ukrainian SSR of the Soviet Union. His family was Jewish, and lived in an apartment with eight other families. Smirnoff eventually became an art teacher in Odesa, and after two years of mandatory military service became a cruise ship comedian on the Black Sea, where he interacted with Americans who described life in the United States, inspiring him to leave the Soviet Union.

In the 1970s, when the Soviet Union marginally relaxed emigration policies, he was eligible to apply for an exit visa. After two years attempting to leave, he came to the United States with his parents in 1977, arriving in New York City with $50 in savings. He has jokingly described that his family was allowed to come to America because of "an agreement between the USSR and America to exchange wheat for Soviet citizens who wished to defect". At the time, neither he nor his parents spoke any English. On arrival to the United States, he was almost sent back to the USSR when his interpreter mistranslated his occupation—comedian—as "party organizer", which immigration authorities thought meant that he was an organizer for the Communist Party of the Soviet Union.

Smirnoff spent a portion of his early days in the United States working as a busboy and bartender at Grossingers Hotel in the Catskill Mountains of New York and living in the employee dormitory.

== Career ==
=== Stand-up comedy ===
Smirnoff began performing stand-up comedy in the US in the late 1970s. After trying to think of a stage name that Americans would recognize, he chose the last name "Smirnoff" after a brand of vodka he was familiar with from his bartending days. At this time, he traveled to Los Angeles to perform at an open mic night at the Comedy Store, where he would eventually become a regular. In the early 1980s, he moved to Los Angeles to further pursue his stand-up comedy career. While living there, he was roommates with aspiring comedians Andrew Dice Clay and Thomas F. Wilson.

=== Film and television ===
After achieving some level of fame, Smirnoff received his first break with a small role in the 1984 film Moscow on the Hudson, where he also helped star Robin Williams with his Russian dialogue on the set. He made many appearances on the sitcom Night Court as Russian immigrant Yakov Korolenko. He subsequently appeared in several other motion pictures, including Buckaroo Banzai (1984), Brewster's Millions (1985) and The Money Pit (1986).

In November 1985, he made his debut on The Tonight Show Starring Johnny Carson and soon became a regular guest on the show. That same year, he appeared in an ad for Miller Lite beer.

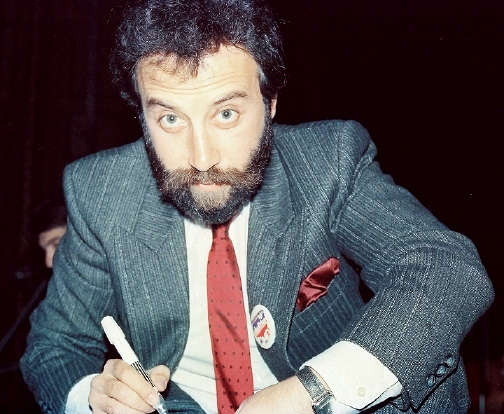
Smirnoff at a Hands Across America promotional event in 1986

In 1986, he garnered a starring role in the television sitcom What a Country!, a show devised specifically for him which lasted for one season. In the late 1980s, Smirnoff was commissioned by ABC to provide educational bumper segments called "Fun Facts" to be aired during Saturday morning cartoons, which would feature a joke about a cultural misunderstanding followed by an obscure fact. He also appeared in commercials for hotel chain Best Western.

=== Politics ===
In 1987, Smirnoff was invited to a party hosted by Washington Times editor-in-chief Arnaud de Borchgrave, which featured President Ronald Reagan as the guest of honor. Reagan and Smirnoff immediately hit it off due to Reagan's love of jokes about life in the Soviet Union, which he would tell in speeches, and Smirnoff became one of his sources for new material. An example of a joke Reagan later told that originated from Smirnoff was "In Russia, if you say, 'Take my wife—please', you come home and she is gone."

Smirnoff was enlisted by Dana Rohrabacher, who was then a speechwriter for Reagan, to help with material for Reagan's speeches, including a speech given in front of Soviet leader Mikhail Gorbachev when Reagan visited the Soviet Union during the Moscow Summit in 1988. Rohrabacher later stated that Smirnoff became "one of the inner circle" of speechwriting advisers during Reagan's final years in office, due to the quality of Smirnoff's suggestions. In 1988, Smirnoff headlined at the annual White House Correspondents' Dinner.

=== Later ventures ===
Since 1993, Smirnoff has been performing at his own 2,000 seat, state of the art theater, and over the years has entertained more than five million people in a live setting. His 31st consecutive season was commemorated in Branson, Missouri in 2024. In the late 1990s he retooled his stand-up act to focus on the differences between men and women, and on solving problems within relationships.

In 2002, Smirnoff appeared in an episode of King of the Hill, "The Bluegrass Is Always Greener". The following year, he appeared on Broadway in a one-man show, As Long As We Both Shall Laugh, deemed by Lawrence Van Gelder of The New York Times as "warmhearted", "delightful" and "splendidly funny". Smirnoff was also a featured writer for AARP: The Magazine and gave readers advice in his column, "Happily Ever Laughter".

=== Education ===
In 2006, Smirnoff received a master's degree in positive psychology from the University of Pennsylvania. He has taught psychology classes at Drury University and Missouri State University and gives seminars and self-help workshops on the topic of improving relationships. In 2016, Smirnoff produced and starred in a comedy special for PBS, Happily Ever Laughter: The Neuroscience of Romantic Relationships. In May 2019, Smirnoff earned a doctorate in psychology and global leadership from Pepperdine University.

== Comedy style ==
=== "America: What a country!" ===
Some of Smirnoff's jokes involved word play based on a limited understanding of American idioms and culture:

- "I saw something that told me this was the place for me. It was a large billboard and it had my name on it: 'Smirnoff...America loves Smirnoff!'"
- "One day the [bar] owner changed my hours and told me I'd be working the graveyard shift. I thought to myself, 'Wow, a bar in a cemetery. What a country! Talk about your last call!' During Happy Hour the place must be dead!"
- "On my first shopping trip, I saw powdered milk...you just add water, and you get milk. Then I saw powdered orange juice...you just add water, and you get orange juice. And then I saw baby powder...I thought to myself, 'What a country!' I'm making my family tonight!"
- "I was recently in a supermarket and I saw something called New Freedom. Freedom in a box! I said to myself, 'What a country!'"
- At Denny's: "When I went in to be seated, the hostess asked me, 'How many in your party?' I said, 'Two million.' She gave me a corner booth."
- While holding a hot dog: "In Russia, we don't eat this part of the dog."
- "Like all foreigners, when you start to learn the language, you will begin by speaking pigeon English. You won't mind, because old ladies will feed you bread crumbs. (The really hard part is learning how to crap on windshields.)"

Other jokes involved comparisons between the U.S. and the U.S.S.R.:

- "Thanksgiving is my favorite American holiday. I really like parades without missiles. (I'll take Bullwinkle over a tank any day!)"
- "I only make fun of Cleveland because all Americans do. Every country has one city that everybody makes fun of. For example, in Russia we used to make fun of Cleveland."
- "They don't play baseball in the Soviet Union because there, no one is safe."
- "There aren't any such things as credit cards in the Soviet Union, not even American Express. They do, however, have Russian Express—'Don't leave home!'"
- "America has many wonderful things we never had in Russia...like warning shots."

=== Russian reversal ===
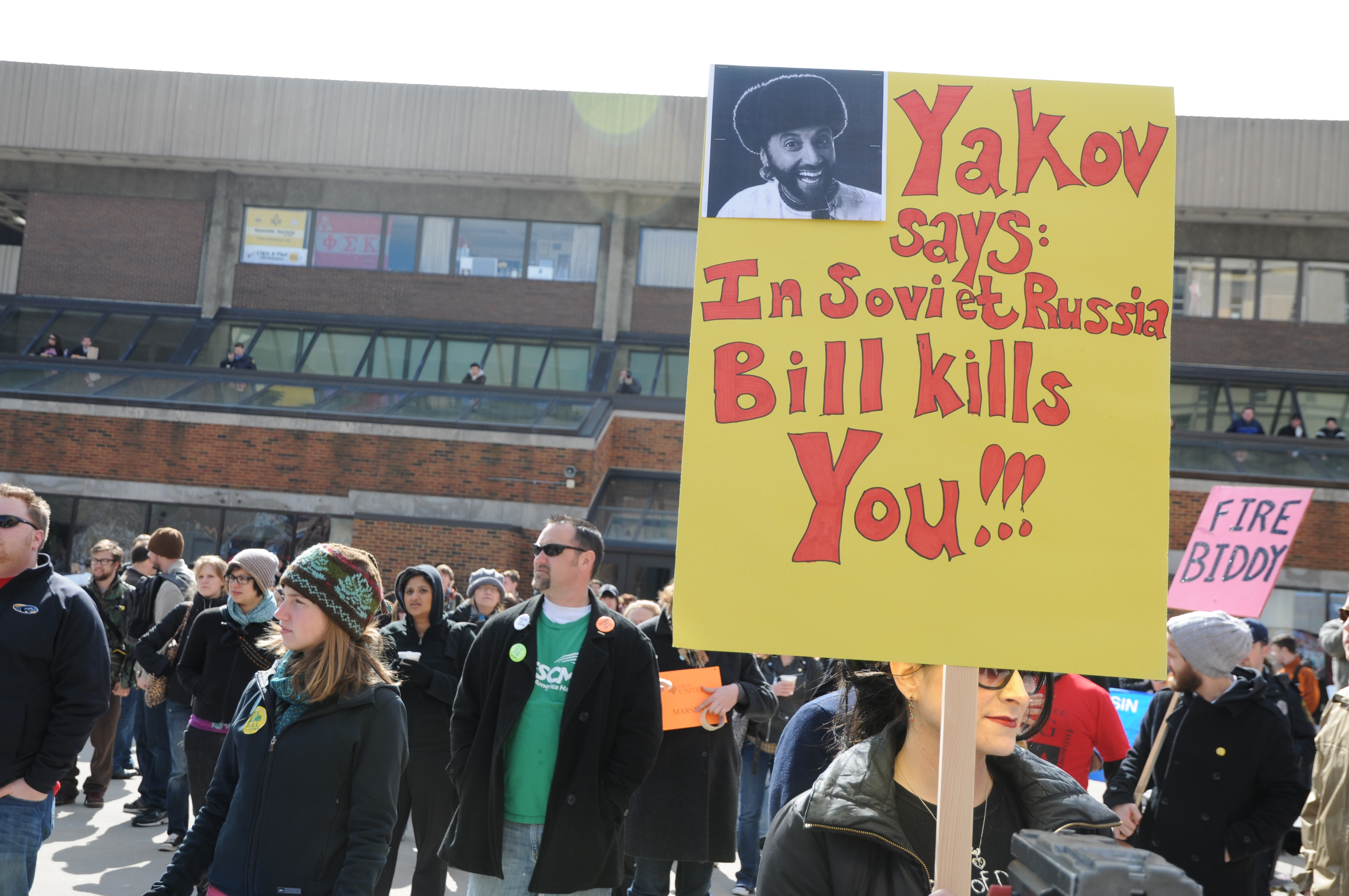
2011 demonstration in Wisconsin, crediting Yakov (Smirnoff) with an example Russian reversal

Smirnoff is often credited with inventing or popularizing the type of joke known as the "Russian reversal", in which life "in Soviet Russia" or "in Russia" is described through an unexpected flip of a sentence's subject and object. An example occurs in one of Smirnoff's Miller Lite commercials from the 1980s, in which he states, "In Russia, party always finds you!" Another can be found in his 1987 book America on Six Rubles a Day: "Show business in America is different from what I was used to. Here you have to find an agent. In Russia, the agent always finds you." Despite Smirnoff rarely using the joke format himself, he has often been directly associated with it throughout pop culture, including episodes of both Family Guy and The Simpsons.

Time magazine observed that the earliest example of the joke can be found in Cole Porter's 1938 musical Leave It to Me! and furthermore credited Bob Hope for first introducing the format to a wide audience while hosting the 30th Academy Awards in 1958.

== Painting ==
Smirnoff is also a painter and has frequently featured the Statue of Liberty in his art since receiving his U.S. citizenship. On the night of the September 11, 2001, terrorist attacks, he started a painting inspired by his feelings about the event, based on an image of the Statue of Liberty. Just prior to the first anniversary of the attacks, he paid US$100,000 for his painting to be transformed into a large mural. Its dimensions were 200 feet by 135 feet (61 m by 41 m). The mural, titled America's Heart, is a pointillist-style piece, with one brush-stroke for each victim of the attacks. Sixty volunteers from the Sheet Metal Workers Union erected the mural on a damaged skyscraper overlooking the ruins of the World Trade Center.

The only stipulation he put on the hanging of the mural was that his name not be listed as the painter. He signed it: "The human spirit is not measured by the size of the act, but by the size of the heart."

The mural remained there until November 2003, when it was removed due to storm damage. Following its removal, Smirnoff had it cut into pieces and would sell them to history enthusiasts.

== Personal life ==
Smirnoff became an American citizen on 4 July 1986.

In 1989, Smirnoff married Linda Dreeszen; they divorced in 2001. They have two children: a daughter, Natasha, born in 1990; and a son, Alexander, born in 1992. In 2019, Smirnoff married Olivia Kosarieva. By January 24, 2026, Smirnoff's 75th birthday, he and Olivia had welcomed the birth of their first child, a son.

== Filmography ==
Among his film credits, Smirnoff has co-starred in movies with Robin Williams (Moscow on the Hudson, 1984), Tom Hanks (The Money Pit, 1986), and Jack Nicholson and Meryl Streep (Heartburn, 1986), in addition to single episodes of several TV series.

- Moscow on the Hudson (1984) as Lev
- The Adventures of Buckaroo Banzai Across the 8th Dimension (1984) as National Security Advisor
- Brewster's Millions (1985) as Vladimir
- The Money Pit (1986) as Shatov
- Heartburn (1986) as Contractor Laszlo
- What a Country! (1986–1987, TV Series) as Nikolai Rostapovich
- Up Your Alley (1989) as Russian Man
- Night Court (1984-1990, TV Series) as Yakov Korolenko; appeared in five episodes
- King of the Hill (1997-2009, TV Series) as Himself; appeared in one episode
- Weekend Warriors (TBA)
