= Alvin Alvarez =

Actor

- Born: November 5, 1989 (age 35)
- Occupation: Actor

Alvin Alvarez (born November 5, 1989) is an actor who is best known for his role as Larry Garcia on the show, The Brothers Garcia.

== Family ==
Alvarez has one sister who is two years older than him, named Amy Alvarez. The character of Larry Garcia is the youngest of 3 siblings on the show, The Brothers Garcia, and back in 2000, Alvarez disclosed to the publication company, Variety, that he relates to him on many different levels. He stated: “Larry is pretty much like me, I have an older sister. My mom is very protective, and he’s the youngest of the family, just like me. I can just be myself, because that’s what it’s about. I don’t need to act much.”

== Career ==
Alvarez is most widely known for his role as Larry Garcia on The Brothers Garcia. Prior to that, he made appearances on other television shows such as ER, The Bernie Mac Show, and Beverly Hills, 90210.

== Television and movies ==
Year	Title	Role	Notes
1999	Profiler	Marta’s Son	Episode: “Las Brisas”
1999	Beverly Hills, 90210	Arturo Alvarez	Episode: The Loo-Ouch
2000	ER	Daniel	Episode: May Day
2001	Norm	Hector	Episode: Norm vs. Cuba
2002	The Bernie Mac Show	Unknown	Episode: Handle Your Business
2003	Hunting of a Man	Young Simon	Movie
2000-2004	The Brothers Garcia	Larry Garcia	Main cast
2022	The Garcias	Larry Garcia	Main cast

== Awards and nominations ==
Year	Award	Category	Work	Result
2001	ALMA Awards	Outstanding Actor in New Television Series	The Brothers Garcia	Nominated
2001	Young Artist Awards	Best Ensemble in a TV Series (Drama or Comedy)	The Brothers Garcia Shared with: Bobby Gonzalez, Jeffrey Licon, Veneza Leza Pitynski	Nominated
2001	Young Artist Awards	Best Performance in a TV series (Comedy or Drama) – Young Actor Age 10 or Under	The Brothers Garcia	Won
2002	Young Artists Awards	Best Ensemble in a TV Series (Drama or Comedy)	The Brothers Garcia Shared with: Bobby Gonzalez, Jeffrey Licon, Veneza Leza Pitynski	Nominated
