= Head over Heels (2001 film) =

2001 American romantic comedy film by Mark Waters

- Theatrical release poster
- Directed by: Mark Waters
- Screenplay by: David Kidd; Ron Burch
- Story by: John J. Strauss; Ed Decter; David Kidd; Ron Burch
- Produced by: Robert Simonds
- Starring: Monica Potter; Freddie Prinze Jr.; Sarah O'Hare; Shalom Harlow
- Cinematography: Mark Plummer
- Edited by: Cara Silverman
- Music by: Randy Edelman; Steve Porcaro
- Production company: Robert Simonds Productions
- Distributed by: Universal Pictures
- Release date: February 2, 2001
- Running time: 86 minutes
- Country: United States
- Languages: English; Russian
- Budget: $14 million
- Box office: $13.1 million

Head over Heels is a 2001 American romantic comedy-thriller film directed by Mark Waters. Starring Monica Potter, Freddie Prinze Jr., Sarah O'Hare, Shalom Harlow, Ivana Miličević, Tomiko Fraser, China Chow and Timothy Olyphant. The film was panned by critics and failed to recover its modest $14 million budget.

== Plot ==
Amanda Pierce, a New York paintings conservator at the Metropolitan Museum of Art, has bad judgment in men, which becomes apparent when she finds her boyfriend cheating on her with a supermodel. She looks for a new apartment, and finds one with four struggling models: Jade, Roxana, Candi, and Holly.

When Amanda discovers that Jim Winston, a guy she likes, lives in the apartment across from hers, she starts spying on him to try to find his flaw. One night she sees him kill a woman, Megan O'Brien. However, she is the only witness; and when the police arrive, they find no evidence of the crime.

Annoyed by the police's lack of effort, Amanda and her new friends investigate Jim on their own. When Amanda confronts him, he turns out to be an undercover FBI agent, Bob Smoot, who was trying to gain a suspect's trust by staging his partner Megan's death. Amanda learns that Jim is investigating a Russian named Strukov, who, under the alias of Halloran, has been smuggling money. He is also the client for whom Amanda has been privately restoring a painting.

Strukov captures Jim, Amanda and her roommates; but they escape when Roxana seduces their Russian guard. They discover Strukov is actually smuggling diamonds. They go to a fashion runway, take down Strukov, and receive special commendations from the FBI.

Jim asks Amanda if they can start over, but she refuses and he leaves. However, Amanda and Jim, going by his real name, Bob, "meet" again. He takes her up to his new apartment, from where they can see Amanda's model friends, who are obviously happy that things turned out so well for her.

== Cast ==
- Freddie Prinze Jr. as Jim Winston / FBI Special Agent Bob Smoot
- Monica Potter as Amanda Pierce
- Ivana Miličević as Roxana Milla Slasnakova
- Shalom Harlow as Jade
- Sarah O'Hare as Candi
- Tomiko Fraser as Holly Payton
- China Chow as Lisa
- Timothy Olyphant as Michael
- Tanja Reichert as Megan O'Brien
- Tanner as Hamlet the Great Dane
- Jay Brazeau as Mr. Halloran / Vadiim Strukov
- Stanley DeSantis as Alfredo
- Betty Linde as Polly
- Norma MacMillan as Gladys
- Bethoe Shirkoff as Noreen
- Tom Shorthouse as Mr. Rankin
- Joe Pascual as Officer Rodriguez
- J.B. Bivens as Mitch

== Production ==
Claire Danes was originally cast in the film. Director Waters admitted to later "disavowing" the film, saying "I’ve acted like it’s not mine ... I had a very aggressive producer who essentially kicked me out of the editing room during my director’s cut.

== Reception ==
The film opened on February 2, 2001, to largely negative reviews, receiving a 10% "Rotten" rating at review aggregator Rotten Tomatoes with an average score of 3.4/10, based on 89 reviews. The website's critics consensus reads: "Head over Heels is being blasted by critics as a huge mess. The plot and jokes are idiotic, while the toilet humor is gratuitous and more gross than funny." The movie has received a Metacritic aggregate rating of 27 out of 100 reviews, denoting "generally unfavorable" reviews based on 25 reviews. Analyzing the individual performances in the film, Robert K. Elder of the Chicago Tribune wrote: "With her Julia Roberts-like vulnerability and kewpie-doll eyes, Potter certainly outshines Prinze, who doesn't deviate much from his past teen dream roles—though he's winsome just the same.

The film was financially unsuccessful. Released on February 2, 2001, the film opened at #7 in 2,338 theaters and grossed $4,804,595 in the opening weekend at the North American box office. The final domestic grossing was $10.4 million while the foreign market grossed $2.7 million for a worldwide total of $13,127,022. Against its $14 million budget, the film was a flop.
