= Nowhere on the Border =

2005 one-act play by Carlos Lacamara

Nowhere on the Border is a one-act play written by American playwright Carlos Lacamara in response to the Immigration conflict. It was first performed in 2005.

== Plot synopsis ==
The play begins with a border vigilante called Gary Dobbs, who finds the body of a Hispanic man. The Border Patrol guard believes that the man is dead, although as he calls the Border Patrol the "dead" man wakes up sharply, startling the guard. He finds out that the man's name is Roberto Castillo and that he is looking for his 22-year-old daughter Pilar who walked into the Arizona Desert from Mexico hoping to join her husband in the United States. Dobbs suspects that Castillo is a drug smuggler and decides to wait with him for the Border Patrol to come and check if his visa is real. Castillo explains that he isn't moving from that particular spot because he found a mutilated corpse and knew that if his daughter was found dead by someone, he would want someone to look after the body until someone came. He is sure that the body isn't his daughter because the man that smuggled her in said that if she died on the trip, he would put a blue cloth over her face, which the corpse lacks. During the time that they are waiting, they talk about their families and their culture, and form a unique bond between each other. At the end, Dobbs sees a blue cloth under a rock next to the body, indicating that the body is in fact Pilar; together they both bury the body.

The other story-line of the play concerns Pilar's journey through the desert. In the Repertorio Español production, these scenes were performed in Spanish. She pays a coyote (a people smuggler) named Don Rey to take her across the Sonoran Desert to join her husband. She walks through the desert with Montoya (the guide) and Jesus Ortiz (another man being smuggled across the border). They encounter hardships along the way and Montoya frequently sniffs cocaine, offering some to Pilar when she is tired. Pilar becomes dehydrated and Jesus pressurizes Montoya to go get help. Montoya sets off to find help and isn't seen again. Jesus places a blue cloth over her face and leaves to find help as well. Pilar's last words are "Kooka-roo", referring to a chicken character with whom her father used to annoy her.

== Production history ==
Nowehere on the Border was first performed at the Hayworth Theater in Wilshire, Los Angeles, California in 2005. Lacamara played Robert and Patrick Rowe played Gary in the production. The cast also included Sergio Arras, Robert Bruzio, Annie Henk, Joe Diaz and Kervin Peralta. The play received a rehearsed reading as part of the MetLife Repertorio Espanol competition in New York in 2006. The reading was directed by Jason Ramirez.
