= The Brothers García =

2000-2004 American teen sitcom

- Genre: Teen sitcom
- Created by: Jeff Valdez; Mike Cevallos; Gibby Cevallos
- Starring: Carlos Lacámara; Ada Maris; Jeffrey Licon; Bobby Gonzalez; Vaneza Pitynski; Alvin Alvarez
- Narrated by: John Leguizamo
- Theme music composer: Rick Kocor
- Composers: Diego De Pietri; Rick Kocor
- Country of origin: United States
- Original language: English
- No. of seasons: 4
- No. of episodes: 52 (TV film included)

Production
- Executive producer: Jeff Valdez
- Producer: Debra Spidell
- Cinematography: Carlos González
- Editor: Jeffrey Scott Runyan
- Camera setup: Single-camera
- Running time: 22 minutes
- Production companies: Si TV; Nickelodeon Productions

Original release
- Network: Nickelodeon
- Release: July 23, 2000 – August 8, 2004

Related
- The Garcias

The Brothers García is an American teen sitcom created by Jeff Valdez, Mike Cevallos, and Gibby Cevallos. It was among the first projects of Sí TV, an effort to produce programming featuring Latino characters that are aimed at a diverse audience. The series was billed as the first English-language sitcom to have an all-Latino cast and creative team. It aired on Nickelodeon from July 23, 2000, to August 8, 2004. After the show, Sí TV launched its own cable-television network.

In 2021, co-creator Jeff Valdez announced that he had obtained the rights to make a sequel series. The reboot, titled The Garcias, was ordered by HBO Max and is controlled entirely by Valdez's company, New Cadence Productions.

== Plot ==
The series follows the life of the Mexican American García family, as narrated by the adult version of one of the family's sons, Larry. Larry recounts his life alongside George, Carlos, and Lorena (his two brothers and fraternal twin sister, respectively), and the way they deal with everyday problems such as school, work, growing up, and all living in one house in San Antonio, Texas.

The series is about boys being boys, with Larry, George and Carlos Garcia putting brotherly love to the test. The Brothers García makes television history as the first English language sitcom with an all Latino cast, directors, and producers. From his funny, now adult perspective, Larry Garcia recalls his quest as an 11-year-old to fit in with his older brothers (13-year-old athletic Carlos and George, a 12-year-old walking encyclopedia) and to express his individuality, despite the attention-getting behavior of his fraternal twin sister Lorena. Ray is a proud father who works as a history professor and his wife Sonia works as a strict hairdresser from an in-house salon who always attempts to make her kids the best they can be. The show is narrated by John Leguizamo as the voice of Adult Larry.

== Cast ==
=== Main ===
- Carlos Lacámara as Ray García
- Ada Maris as Sonia García
- Jeffrey Licon as Carlos García
- Bobby Gonzalez as George García
- Vaneza Pitynski as Lorena García
- Alvin Alvarez as Larry García
- John Leguizamo as Adult Larry García (voice)

=== Recurring ===
- Lupe Ontiveros as Abuelita (4 episodes)
- James Santigo as CJ
- Jerry Messing as Tiny
- Kay Panabaker as Carrie Bauer
- Camille Guaty as Alex (3 episodes)
- Penn Badgley as Eddie Bauer (2 episodes)
- Natalie Amenula as Christina Contreras (2 episodes)
- George Lopez as Mr. Fender (2 episodes)

== Episodes ==
| Season | Episodes | Originally released | |
| Season | Episodes | First released | Last released |
|---|---|---|---|
| 1 | 7 | July 23, 2000 | October 8, 2000 |
| 2 | 13 | April 21, 2001 | August 4, 2001 |
| 3 | 15 | March 3, 2002 | June 9, 2002 |
| 4 | 17 | June 21, 2003 | August 8, 2004 |

=== Season 1 (2000) ===
| No. overall | No. in season | Title | Directed by | Written by | Original release date |
|---|---|---|---|---|---|
| 1 | 1 | "Best Laid Plans" | Mike & Gibby Cevallos | Story by : Jeff Valdez and Mike & Gibby Cevallos; Teleplay by : Jeff Valdez | July 23, 2000 |
| 2 | 2 | "Love Me Tender" | Georg Stanford Brown | Story by : Jeff Valdez and Luisa Leschin; Teleplay by : Jeff Valdez and Luisa Leschin | July 30, 2000 |
| 3 | 3 | "The Right Stuff" | Virgil Fabian | Story by : Jeff Valdez; Teleplay by : Jeff Valdez | July 30, 2000 |
| 4 | 4 | "No Hablo Espanol" | Mike & Gibby Cevallos | Story by : Jeff Valdez and Luisa Leschin; Teleplay by : Jose Rivera and Jeff Valdez | August 6, 2000 |
| 5 | 5 | "A Hunting We Will Go" | Mike & Gibby Cevallos | Jeff Valdez | August 27, 2000 |
| 6 | 6 | "A Day in the Life" | Linda Mendoza | Story by : Jeff Valdez and Ruben Gonzales; Teleplay by : Jose Rivera | September 3, 2000 |
| 7 | 7 | "Bad Hair Day" | Joe Menendez | Luisa Leschin and Jeff Valdez | October 8, 2000 |

=== Season 2 (2001) ===
| No. overall | No. in season | Title | Directed by | Written by | Original release date |
|---|---|---|---|---|---|
| 8 | 1 | "Love is Very... Confusing" | Jeff Valdez | Jose Rivera | April 21, 2001 |
| 9 | 2 | "Meal Ticket" | Mike & Gibby Cevallos | Shelly Landau | April 28, 2001 |
| 10 | 3 | "Lotto Bucks" | Linda Mendoza Kahle | Luis Santeiro | May 12, 2001 |
| 11 | 4 | "Big Winner" | Ted Lange | Luisa Leschin | May 12, 2001 |
| 12 | 5 | "But Football is a Religion" | Joe Menendez | Abraham Alfonso Brown | May 19, 2001 |
| 13 | 6 | "You Go Girl" | Mike & Gibby Cevallos | Shelly Landau | June 2, 2001 |
| 14 | 7 | "Larry's Curse" | Matt Casado | Josefina Lopez | June 9, 2001 |
| 15 | 8 | "Over Extended Family" | Joe Menendez | Luisa Leschin | June 16, 2001 |
| 16 | 9 | "Cold Turkey" | Isabelle Mejias fox | Jose Rivera | June 23, 2001 |
| 17 | 10 | "The Student Buddy" | Jeff Valdez | Gary Rosenkranz | July 7, 2001 |
| 18 | 11 | "The Sub" | Matt Casado | Story by : Jeff Valdez; Teleplay by : Abraham Alfonso Brown | July 14, 2001 |
| 19 | 12 | "The Crib" | Virgil Fabian | Jeff Valdez | July 28, 2001 |
| 20 | 13 | "Band on the Run" | Virgil Fabian | Silvia Cardenas | August 4, 2001 |

=== Season 3 (2002) ===
| No. overall | No. in season | Title | Directed by | Written by | Original release date |
|---|---|---|---|---|---|
| 21 | 1 | "Piece of My Heart" | Unknown | Unknown | February 10, 2002 |
| 22 | 2 | "School Daze" | Joe Menendez | Silvia Cardenas | March 3, 2002 |
| 23 | 3 | "Tamale Follies" | Virgil Fabian | Luisa Leschin | March 10, 2002 |
| 24 | 4 | "West Side Stories" | Carlos LaCamara | Abraham Alfonso Brown | March 17, 2002 |
| 25 | 5 | "Brother's Keeper" | Mike & Gibby Cevallos | Gary Wilson | March 24, 2002 |
| 26 | 6 | "Maybe Baby" | Henry Chan | Shelly Landau | March 31, 2002 |
| 27 | 7 | "Don't Give Up Your Day Job" | Salvador Carrasco | Ed Evans | April 7, 2002 |
| 28 | 8 | "Space Race" | Virgil Fabian | Gary Wilson | April 14, 2002 |
| 29 | 9 | "Hot Today, Chili Tomorrow" | Mike & Gibby Cevallos | Abraham Alfonso Brown | April 21, 2002 |
| 30 | 10 | "Guess Who's Coming to Dinner?" | Mike & Gibby Cevallos | Gary Rosenkranz | April 28, 2002 |
| 31 | 11 | "When the Cat's Away" | Carlos Gonzalez | Michael Ajakwe | May 5, 2002 |
| 32 | 12 | "Don't Judge a Book By its Cover" | Tony Plana | Jeff Valdez & Shelly Landau | May 19, 2002 |
| 33 | 13 | "When the Time Comes" | Unknown | Unknown | May 26, 2002 |
| 34 | 14 | "Mama's Friend" | Unknown | Unknown | June 2, 2002 |
| 35 | 15 | "Use Your Head" | Unknown | Unknown | June 9, 2002 |

=== Season 4 (2003–04) ===
| No. overall | No. in season | Title | Directed by | Written by | Original release date |
|---|---|---|---|---|---|
| 36 37 38 | 1 2 3 | "Mysteries of the Maya" | Jeff Valdez | Jeff Valdez | June 21, 2003 |
| 39 | 4 | "New Man on Campus... Sorta" | Mike & Gibby Cevallos | Silvia Cardenas | June 29, 2003 |
| 40 | 5 | "New Tunes" | Joe Menendez | Shelly Landau | July 6, 2003 |
| 41 | 6 | "Novelathon" | Tony Plana | Luisa Leschin | July 13, 2003 |
| 42 | 7 | "Right Place, Right Time" | Mike & Gibby Cevallos | Abraham Alfonso Brown | July 20, 2003 |
| 43 | 8 | "Big Break" | Joe Menendez | Cary Okmin | July 27, 2003 |
| 44 45 | 9 10 | "Sisters Garcia" | Mike & Gibby Cevallos | Sylvia Cardenas, Shelly Landau | September 7, 2003 |
| 46 | 11 | "Models, Inc." | Carlos Lacamara | Gary Rosenkranz | September 21, 2003 |
| 47 | 12 | "It Was Fun While It Lasted" | Elizabeth Pena | Abraham Alfonso Brown | October 5, 2003 |
| 48 | 13 | "Two Left Feet" | Carlos Gonzalez | Gigi New | October 12, 2003 |
| 49 | 14 | "Drive Me Crazy" | Jose Luis Valenzuela | Abraham Alfonso Brown | October 19, 2003 |
| 50 | 15 | "The Spin Zone" | Tony Plana | Story by : Jeff Valdez; Teleplay by : Abraham Alfonso Brown | November 2, 2003 |
| 51 | 16 | "Moving On Up" | Alfonso Riberio | Cary Okmin | November 16, 2003 |
| 52 | 17 | "Carmen De Lovely" | Unknown | Unknown | August 8, 2004 |

== Broadcast ==
Reruns aired on "Nick on CBS" from March 13 to September 11, 2004. Reruns on The N ran from April 7 until May 23, 2008.

== Sequel ==
A sequel series to The Brothers García, consisting of ten episodes and titled The Garcias, aired on April 14, 2022. The original six main cast members reprise their roles in the sequel.

== Awards and nominations ==
| Year | Award | Category | Nominee(s) | Result |
|---|---|---|---|---|
| 2001 | Young Artist Award | Best Family TV Comedy Series | The Brothers García | Won |
| 2001 | Young Artist Award | Best Performance in a TV Series: Young Actor Age Ten or Under | Alvin Alvarez | Won |
| 2001 | Young Artist Award | Best Ensemble in a TV Series | Alvin Alvarez, Bobby Gonzalez, Jeffrey Licon, and Vaneza Pitynski | Nominated |
| 2001 | ALMA Award | Outstanding Director of a Comedy Series | Joe Menendez | Won |
| 2001 | ALMA Award | Outstanding Actor in a New Television Series | Alvin Alvarez | Nominated |
| 2001 | ALMA Award | Outstanding Actress in a New Television Series | Ada Maris | Nominated |
| 2001 | ALMA Award | Outstanding Director of a Comedy Series | Mike Cevallos and Gibby Cevallos | Nominated |
| 2001 | ALMA Award | Outstanding Director of a Comedy Series | Virgil L. Fabian | Nominated |
| 2001 | ALMA Award | Outstanding Director of a Comedy Series | Linda Mendoza | Nominated |
| 2001 | ALMA Award | Outstanding Television Series | The Brothers García | Nominated |
| 2002 | Humanitas Prize | Children's Live-Action | Gary Rosenkranz | Nominated |
| 2002 | Young Artist Award | Best Ensemble in a TV Series | Alvin Alvarez, Bobby Gonzalez, Jeffrey Licon, and Vaneza Pitynski | Nominated |
| 2002 | ALMA Award | Outstanding Supporting Actress in a Television Series | Maria Canals-Barrera | Won |
| 2002 | ALMA Award | Excellence in Make-Up in Television and Film | Mark Sanchez | Nominated |
| 2002 | ALMA Award | Outstanding Children's Television Programming | The Brothers Garcia | Nominated |
| 2003 | Imagen Awards | Best Children's Non-Animated Programming | The Brothers Garcia | Won |
| 2004 | Imagen Awards | Best Children's Non-Animated Programming | The Brothers Garcia | Won |
