= Ada Maris =

American actress (born 1957)

- Born: Ada Marentes; June 13, 1957 (age 69); East Los Angeles, California, US
- Occupation: Actress
- Years active: 1983-present
- Known for: Nurses; The Brothers Garcia
- Spouse: Tony Plana (m. 1988)
- Children: 2

Ada Maris (born Ada Marentes, June 13, 1957) is an American actress known for her starring roles in the sitcoms Nurses and The Brothers Garcia.

Maris was born in East Los Angeles and grew up there. She attended Boston University and UCLA.

In 1986–1987, Maris portrayed Maria Conchita Lopez in the syndicated television comedy What a Country!. From 1991 to 1994, she became well known for her role in the NBC sitcom Nurses. Maris was proud of the development of her character, Gina, because she said that Gina "evolved into a real person." She has also appeared in many other shows including The Cosby Show, Hill Street Blues, Hunter, Home Improvement, and The District. Maris has also acted on stage.

From 2000 to 2004, Maris starred in the Nickelodeon show The Brothers Garcia. In 2004–2005, she appeared as Starfleet Captain Erika Hernandez on several episodes of Star Trek: Enterprise. Maris was in the NBC series, Deception in 2013. Maris has also been in the cast of many theater performances.

== Filmography ==
=== Film ===
| Year | Title | Role | Notes |
|---|---|---|---|
| 1986 | About Last Night | Carmen | Film debut |
| 1989 | Out Cold | Customer #1 | |
| 1993 | Miracle on Interstate 880 | Petra Beruman | |
| 1996 | 2 Days in the Valley | Detective Carla Valenzuela | |
| 2000 | The Egg Plant Lady | Laura Vecino | |

=== Television ===
| Year | Title | Role | Notes |
|---|---|---|---|
| 1983 | Hardcastle and McCormick | Desk clerk | 1 episode: "Flying Down to Rio" |
| 1984 | a.k.a Pablo | | 1 episode: "The Woman Who Came to Dinner" |
| 1985 | The Cosby Show | Selena Cruz | 1 episode: "Mr. Quiet" |
| 1985 | Hill Street Blues | Purnell | 1 episode: "Oh, You Kid" |
| 1985 | Hunter | Angie Chavira | 1 episode: "Waiting for Mr. Wrong" |
| 1986 | Knight Rider | Anna-Lucia Cortez / Lieutenant Estrallita Ramirez | 1 episode: "Knight of a Thousand Devils" |
| 1986-1987 | What a Country! | Maria Conchita Lopez | Main role |
| 1988 | CBS Summer Playhouse | Princess Isaine | 1 episode: "Further Adventures" |
| 1988 | Juarez | Marielena Juarez | TV movie |
| 1989 | Superboy | Natasha | 1 episode: "Black Flamingo" |
| 1990 | Broken Badges | Tina Cardenas | TV mini series 1 episode: "Pilot" |
| 1990 | Wiseguy | Celia Burns | 2 episodes |
| 1991-1994 | Nurses | Gina Cuevas | Main role |
| 1996 | Home Improvement | Mary Ellen | 1 episode: "Workshop 'Til You Drop" |
| 1997 | Nash Bridges | Denise Sanchez | 1 episode: "Inside Out" |
| 1999 | My Little Assassin | Celia Sánchez Manduley | TV movie |
| 1999 | Walker, Texas Ranger | Theresa Estrella | 1 episode: "Lost Boys" |
| 2000 | Resurrection Blvd. | Therese Santiago | 1 episode: "Pilot: Part 1" |
| 2000 | The Princess & the Barrio Boy | Sirena's Mother | TV movie |
| 2000-2004 | The Brothers Garcia | Sonia Garcia | Main role |
| 2002-2010 | One Life to Live | Aurelia River | Recurring role |
| 2003 | The Brothers Garcia: Mysteries of the Maya | Sonia Garcia | TV movie Main role |
| 2004 | The District | Sonya Ruberio-Bukantz | 1 episode: "On Guard" |
| 2004-2005 | Star Trek: Enterprise | Capt. Erika Hernandez | Recurring role - 52nd most important character within the Star Trek science fiction universe |
| 2005 | Mystery Woman | Melinda | TV film series "Mystery Woman: Game time" |
| 2013 | Deception | Sue Rodriguez | 1 episode: "Tell Me" |
| 2018-2021 | Mayans M.C. | Dita Galindo | Recurring seasons 1–2; guest season 3 |
| 2022 | The Garcias | Sonia Garcia | Main Role; HBO Max series |
