= Jeff Valdez =

American producer

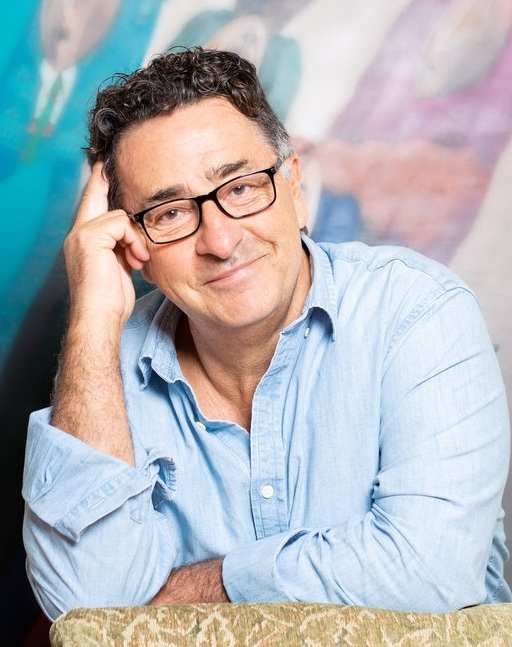
- Born: January 31, 1956 (age 70)

Jeff Valdez (born January 31, 1956) is an American producer, writer, and studio executive in shaping Latino programming in English-language media. Considered a leading figure in the early development of this genre, Valdez helped bring Latino stories and voices to a broader American audience.

He co-founded SiTV (now known as Fuse), the first national cable network in the U.S. that was both owned and operated by Latinos. Among his notable creative achievements, Valdez is credited as writer, director, and creator of the hit family comedy The Brothers García, which aired from 2000 to 2004. He is the creator of the Latino Laugh Festival in 1997, a platform that showcased stand-up comedy by Latino performers.

In 2003, Valdez launched Sí TV, a new nationwide English-language cable channel targeting Latino audiences. A few years later, in 2007, he joined the board of Maya Entertainment, a company focused on producing Latino-themed films primarily in English. Valdez later founded New Cadence Productions, a company that continues to focus on Latino storytelling, and has produced the HA Comedy Festival in 2020 and The Brothers Garcia reboot, The Garcias, in 2022.

== Career ==
Valdez moved to Los Angeles in 1993, where he launched the television show "Comedy Compadres" for KTLA, channel 5. Over the years, he became involved in multiple projects, writing, producing, and directing pilots for several major networks, including Disney (Play Ball), Showtime (Latino Laugh Festival), NBC (Valdez and Hacienda Heights), Galavisión (Cafe Ole, Funny is Funny), and Nickelodeon (The Brothers Garcia).

Recognizing the growing demand for content that reflects the experiences of English-speaking Latinos, Valdez partnered with Bruce Barshop a venture capitalist and founded Sí TV, the first Latino national channel for English-speaking Latino in the United States. Under Valdez's leadership as CEO for the first two years, Si TV rapidly grew, reaching 22 million homes within the first three years and becoming a key platform for Latino-centered English-language programming.

In 2007, Valdez was named Chairman of Quepasa Corp./Quepasa.com (NASDAQ-QPSA), a bilingual social network platform targeting both US and Latin American markets. During his time there, Valdez played a pivotal role in rebranding and revitalizing the social network with a creative vision. His contributions led to the development of a digital feature called "Papacito," which expanded the reach of Quepasa's network.

That same year, Valdez joined Maya Entertainment as a co-chairman, at the invitation of producer Moctesuma Esparza. From 2007 to 2011, Maya operated as the only Latino Global Film Distribution Company, producing content that appeals to diverse American Latino and multicultural audiences, distributing content for theatrical release and syndication.

In early 2018, Valdez and Sol Trujillo co-founded New Cadence Productions, a U.S. television and film content creation studio dedicated to elevating Latino voices and promoting their role in the media. New Cadence Production has since partnered with Warner Media. The studio's first project was the 2020 HA Comedy Festival, resulting in a 1-hour comedy special streaming on HBO Max. The festival was green lit for a second year in the 2021 HA Comedy Special, released on HBO Max, alongside the premiere of “Comedy Chingonas,” an all-female comedy special. The following year, in 2022, Valdez revisited one of his earlier successes with a 10-episode reboot of The Brother Garcia, titled The Garcias, which was filmed in Mexico's Riviera Maya. The series debuted on HBO Max.

Through the HA Comedy Festival, Valdez continues to elevate Latino talent in media, serving as writer, producer, and director for both the 2020 and 2021 editions of the festival. These efforts brought Latino comedy to a broader audience via HBO Max.

== Awards and recognitions ==
- "Top 50 People Who Matter" by CNN
- "Top 50 Minorities in Cable" by Multichannel News
- "50 People to Watch" by Los Angeles Times
- "Top 10 Players in the U.S. Hispanic Media Market" by Ad Age
- "Top 50 Marketers in America" by Advertising Age
- Quasar Award, for his groundbreaking Sí TV
- Racial Harmony Award, from the Center for Ethnic Understanding
- NHMC Impact Award (2001)
- ALMA Award, from National Council of La Raza

Valdez was appointed by US President Bill Clinton to the Advisory Committee on the Arts of the Kennedy Center (Washington DC, 1996–2000.) He has been a member of the Museum of the Moving Image Board of Directors (New York, 2000–2006), and of The Los Angeles School For The Performing Arts Board of Advisers (2006-2008.)

== Filmography ==
- HA Comedy Festival: The Art of Comedy 2020 and 2021
- Without Men || Feature Film || Executive producer || 2010
- Unacceptable Behavior || TV series || Executive producer || 2006
- Urban Jungle 2 || TV series || Executive producer, Writer || 2005
- Breakfast, Lunch, and Dinner || TV series || Executive producer || 2004
- Across the Hall || TV series || Executive producer || 2004
- The Drop || TV series || Executive producer || 2004
- The Rub || TV series || Executive producer || 2004
- Latino Laugh Festival: The Show || TV series || Executive producer || 2004
- Urban Jungle || TV series || Writer, executive producer || 2004
- The Brothers García: Mysteries of the Maya || TV movie || Writer, director || 2003
- The Brothers García || TV series || Co-Creator, Executive Producer, Writer, Director || 2000-2004
- Café Ole' with Giselle Fernandez || TV series || Writer, producer || 1997
- Latino Laugh Festival || TV special || Producer || 1997, 1998, 1999
- Funny is Funny || TV series || Writer, Executive producer || 1997
- Comedy Compadres || TV series || Writer, executive producer || 1994
- Almost Live From The Comedy Corner || TV Comedy Show || Writer, producer, Director || 1992
- Perry Mason: The Case of the Ruthless Reporter || TV movie || Actor || 1991
