= Jeffrey Licon =

American actor

- Born: August 29, 1985 (age 40); Los Angeles, California, U.S.
- Occupation: Actor
- Years active: 1992—present

Jeffrey Licon (born August 29, 1985) is an American actor most notable for his role as Carlos Garcia on the Nickelodeon show, The Brothers García. He portrayed Eric Preston, a supporting character in the 2004 movie Mysterious Skin. He had a leading role in Alien Raiders, and smaller roles in the television series Joan of Arcadia, NYPD Blue, Cold Case, Walker, Texas Ranger, Second Noah, Lincoln Heights, The Mentalist, and The Closer (Season 4 Episode 12).
