= Carlos González (cinematographer) =

American cinematographer and film producer

- Born: Maturín, Venezuela
- Citizenship: Venezuela; United States; Spain
- Education: University of Miami (B.Arch.); AFI Conservatory (MFA)
- Occupations: Cinematographer; Director
- Years active: 1991–present
- Organizations: Society of Venezuelan Cinematographers

Carlos González, VSC, is a Venezuelan cinematographer and director based in Los Angeles, California.

== Career ==
As a cinematographer, some of his film credits include Raw Justice (1994), Original Gangstas (1996), Joseph's Gift (1998), The Breaks (1999), Wishmaster 2: Evil Never Dies (1999) and The Omega Code (1999).

In television, González served as a cinematographer on the series The New Normal, Switched At Birth and From Dusk Till Dawn: The Series, among others. In 2000, he became a cinematographer on the Nickelodeon series The Brothers García, he made his directorial debut on that series in 2002. His other directing credits include Unfabulous, Big Time Rush, 100 Things To Do Before High School, Switched At Birth, Stuck In The Middle, and the three-hour miniseries Lost In The West. As a film director, he directed the documentaries Children of the Clouds (2007) and Robbed of Truth (2011).

González was born in Maturín, Venezuela. He has a Bachelor of Architecture from the University of Miami and a Masters in Cinematography from the American Film Institute. He holds triple nationality, U.S., E.U. (Spain) and Venezuela. He is a member of the Directors Guild of America, the Venezuelan Society of Cinematography (SVC) and the International Cinematographers Guild.
