= Wendy Blair =

Wendy Blair (September 15, 1938, Flushing, New York – April 14, 2009, North Hollywood, California) was an American television producer.

She was the first female junior executive at CBS. She worked as an associate producer and producer on various television series, including, most notably, Three's Company and its spinoffs, The Ropers and Three's A Crowd. She worked for with the Smothers Brothers as their manager of business operations for many years until the beginning of 2009, shortly before she died. She also worked with Dick Clark Productions and Sid and Marty Krofft Enterprises.

== Death ==
Wendy Blair died from cancer in 2009, aged 70. She was survived by a son, a daughter, a granddaughter, and a sister.
