= NuvoTV =

American cable television network (2004–2015)

- Final logo used until shutdown in 2015.
- Country: United States
- Broadcast area: Nationwide
- Headquarters: Glendale, California

Programming
- Language: English

Ownership
- Parent: Fuse Networks, LLC.

History
- Launched: February 25, 2004 (21 years ago)
- Closed: September 30, 2015 (10 years ago)
- Replaced by: FM, Fuse
- Former names: Sí TV (2004–11)

NuvoTV (formerly known as Sí TV) was an American cable television network. It was launched on February 25, 2004, and offered to the Latino community with exclusively English-language programming. It ended operations on September 30, 2015, when its programming merged with Fuse; the channel space was replaced with the new music video channel concept, FM.

== History ==
=== Beginnings as a production company (1997–2003) ===
Founded by US-based entrepreneurs Jeff Valdez and Bruce Barshop, Sí TV was established in 1997 as a production company to develop, produce and distribute original English-language entertainment aimed primarily at a Latino audience. In 1998, the company produced two half-hour bilingual programs – the talk show Cafe Ole with Giselle Fernandez and the comedy series Funny Is Funny – for the Spanish-language cable channel Galavisión. The two series, which dealt primarily with Latino culture in the United States, helped boost Galavisión's audience share on weekends in the 18–34 Latino demographic by 83%. When Sí TV and Galavisión parted ways in August of that year, Valdez sold the shows into national syndication in 52 markets, drawing solid ratings in New York City, Miami, Houston, and San Antonio.

On March 10, 1999, Sí TV announced plans to launch the first English-language cable network aimed at young Latinos. Valdez expressed interest in debuting the channel during the first quarter of 2000. George A. Greenberg of Newberger Greenberg & Associates, a media advisory firm that helped develop the Sci-Fi Channel prior to its August 1992 launch, said the network was expected to initially be available to approximately 6 million American homes. Greenberg estimated that it would cost about $30 million to get Sí TV "up and running" and another $70 million to operate it for its first three years. According to Los Angeles Times columnist Kevin Baxter, although Latinos make up 11% of the population of the United States, and "their numbers are growing six times faster than the population at large", there have been few attempts to develop programming of "relevance to the acculturated segment of that community". Esther Renteria, chairwoman of the National Hispanic Media Coalition, stated that: "I think there's a need for Sí TV, but whether it's too soon or not, I don't know".

Sí TV's production of the Viacom-owned Nickelodeon sitcom The Brothers García (which ran from 2000 to 2004), made television history as the first English-language sitcom with a cast and creative team of writers, directors and producers made entirely of Latinos. In January 2003, it was announced that Sí TV would be launched nationally on satellite provider Dish Network at the beginning of that summer. Valdez stated that: "For years, people have ignored the young demographic that doesn't speak Spanish but needs a voice and wants a place to call home".

=== Launch as a cable television network (2004–10) ===
Sí TV logo used from 2004 to 2008.

Sí TV was launched as a cable network on February 25, 2004, becoming the first exclusively English-language cable channel catering to the Latino community. It became a bicultural alternative to Spanish-language networks such as Univision and Telemundo. According to Sean O'Neal of The A.V. Club, the channel is marketed toward audiences who "enjoy a Spanish flavor without all the actual Spanish". Sí TV's target audience of young adults aged 18–34 are "presumably those who have long since assimilated into American convention", and who "don't necessarily have any particular fealty to the sort of programming that goes to great lengths to remind them of their heritage – unlike their first-generation parents or grandparents". Within three months of its launch, Sí TV had seven million subscribers nationwide.

In April 2004, Sí TV announced that it had secured more than $60 million in financing from a large group that includes "major pay" television distributors and several private equity investors, including Time Warner, EchoStar Communications and DND Equity Partners. That August, Sí TV hired Rori Peters (who began her career in commercial banking, was previously a vice president at Comedy Central, worked for Court TV and served as a 2002 national chairperson for Women in Cable) as its vice president of affiliate relations. In this role, she was responsible for developing the department and increasing the network's subscriber base. In August 2005, the network appointed Michael Schwimmer (a former top lieutenant at EchoStar Communications) as its CEO. In April 2006, Valdez stepped down as head of programming of Sí TV. Edward R. Leon, the network's senior vice president of production, assumed the additional role of acting head of programming.

Sí TV logo used from 2008 to 2011.

During the 2008 presidential election, Sí TV teamed up with voter registration organization, Voto Latino, to mount a "Crash the Parties" contest to pick two Latino "political junkies" to serve as reporters for the channel at the Democratic and Republican National Conventions. Video entries were judged by the public and a panel, including CNN anchor Rick Sanchez, Afro-Latina actress Rosario Dawson, Craigslist's Craig Newmark, former Texas congressman Henry Bonilla, YouTube's Steve Grove and Republican National Hispanic Assembly chairman Danny Vargas. The contest awarded Sí TV national impact. Sí TV and Voto Latino also hosted a series of registration events in Chicago, Phoenix, Sacramento, San Jose and San Diego. According to SNL Kagan, in 2009, the network was estimated to have earned more than $15 million in net ad sales revenue.

=== Relaunch as NUVOtv (2011–13) ===
Sí TV was confusing. People would ask if that was 'sea' like the ocean or 'see' like you can see television. You can imagine what's it's been like dealing with that sort of confusion. We also did some proprietary research and realized that it also conveyed a sense of exclusivity. The bicultural Latino audience is much broader than that. It's second-generation, fourth-generation Latino. They don't see themselves watching a television network that has a Spanish-language name

— Schwimmer on the network's name change

On January 18, 2011, Telemundo's ad sales veteran Craig Geller was named Sí TV's senior vice president of advertising sales. Of his move, Geller stated that: "It's the right time in the right market and Sí TV is the right network. The marketplace is poised for explosive growth and the 2010 Census will validate the fact that bicultural Latinos are absolutely the fastest-growing demo in the U.S." He further stated that the job "was an opportunity he couldn’t pass up". He commented: "Having been a student of the marketplace for as many years as I have, I recognized that the network is ready to take a huge leap forward. At the same time, our audience is growing tremendously. The time has come for advertisers to embrace these consumers, in a culturally relevant way, and the place to do that is Sí TV".

In March 2011, the channel reached approximately 25 to 27 million households, according to its senior vice president of marketing Rafael Oller. The network expected to reach 30 million households by the end of 2011; a milestone that would make it eligible to be rated by Nielsen and would therefore be of more interest to advertisers.

On July 4, 2011, the network underwent a rebrand and changed its name to NUVOtv ("nuvo" being a portmanteau of "NUevo" and "VOice", reflecting "the dual cultural pillars of today's American Bi-Cultural Latinos"), in a "bid to better pursue bicultural Latino audiences". The name change was their part of an effort to tackle the power of the America's growing Latino population. Oller stated that: "Most everyone is focused on total U.S. Hispanics, but the real story is the bicultural Latino. Three out of four speak English well or very well. These bicultural Latinos self-identify as Latino and American and are looking for culturally relevant programming". In August 2012, nuvoTV announced that they had raised $40 million from current investors, Columbia Capital LLC and Rho Capital Partners Inc., and new investors, Veronis Suhler Stevenson LLC and Tennenbaum Capital Partners LLC.

NUVOtv logo used from 2011 to 2013.

On September 11, NUVOtv announced a premier partnership with entertainer/entrepreneur Jennifer Lopez, which would focus on appealing the network's programming to a modern, Latino audience that is "growing rapidly and in need of new, high-quality content". Lopez would work on the creative side of the network, managing marketing and programming production with her production company, Nuyorican Productions, as well as periodically appearing on programs featured on the network's programming. According to The Huffington Post, with a growing Latino audience, "there is more demand for television programming around that audience. Until now, there have only been a few networks focused on this demographic, and really none focused on providing Latino cultural content in English". Lopez told USA Today that when she was growing up there was very little programming that appealed to her heritage, stating that: "Growing up in the Bronx as a little Puerto Rican girl watching TV and not having a lot to identify with. West Side Story was really my favorite thing because it had Puerto Ricans in it". Lopez stated that her partnership with nuvoTV marked a natural step in her career. "I'm in this business and I do know this business on many different levels – in music, in television, in film production, and as an actress, and in so many different ways, even in fashion. It's kind of right up my alley," she said. Lopez was named as chief creative officer of the network on May 16, 2013.

=== Fuse Media (2014–15) ===
On April 4, 2014, SiTV Media announced that it would acquire cable music network Fuse for $226 million, in a deal which resulted in its former owner, The Madison Square Garden Company, also acquiring a 15% stake in SiTV. Prior to the official announcement, Benny Medina (Jennifer Lopez's manager and the network's chief creative officer) stated that if SiTV were to acquire Fuse, there were no immediate plans to make any major changes to the network's programming, emphasizing that Fuse and NuvoTV would be "two different companies with two different identities, audiences and goals."

In 2015, it was announced that NuvoTV would fold into Fuse, as the latter network expands its programming to target an audience called "New Young Americans". After that, NuvoTV continued to premiere new programming. Nuvo TV merged with Fuse TV on September 30, 2015.
