= List of programs broadcast by Fuse =

This is a list of programs that are currently airing, or have aired in the past, on Fuse.

== Current programming ==
These programs are seen regularly, or infrequently, as of August 2026.

=== Reruns of ended series ===
- Curvy Girls
- Hip-Hop Houdini
- Hype Up
- Kickasso
- Like, Share, Dimelo
- Made From Scratch
- Model Latina (Note: NuvoTV Original)
- Sex Sells
- Shine True
- Struggle Gourmet
- Sugar and Toys
- That White People Shit
- T-Pain's School of Business
- True Dating Stories
- Unbreakable
- Upcycle Nation
- We Need to Talk About America

=== Acquired ===
- TallBoyz

== Former programming ==
These programs are no longer airing on the channel.

=== Original/first-run series ===
- Big Boy’s Neighborhood
- Big Freedia: Queen of Bounce
- Billy on the Street
- Complex X Fuse
- Crusty's Dirt Demons (2004–07)
- Daily Download (2004–06)
- The Daily Noise
- Ex-Wives of Rock (2012-14)
- Hoppus on Music
- The Hustle
- The Hustle After Party
- IMX (Interactive Music Exchange) (2003–04)
- Insane Clown Posse Theater
- Kung Faux (2003–05)
- Ming’s Dynasty
- Metal Asylum (2005–06)
- Munchies (2005–06)
- My Dad Rocks (2011)
- No. 1 Countdown
- NOFX: Backstage Passport (2008)
- Pants-Off Dance-Off (2005–07)
- Pitbull: Beyond Worldwide
- Rad Girls (2007–08)
- The Read with Kid Fury and Crissle West
- Rock and Roll Acid Test (2008–09)
- Rock and Roll Hall of Fame Induction Ceremony
- The Sauce (2007–08)
- Sessions@AOL (2003–04)
- SKEE TV
- Slave to the Metal (2005–07)
- Steven's Untitled Rock Show (2004–09)
- Talking Metal On Fuse (2007–09)
- Transcendent
- Uranium (2003–05)
- Victory TV
- Video on Trial
- Warped Roadies
- White Guy Talk Show
- The Whitest Kids U' Know (2008; moved to IFC)

=== Acquired/syndicated programming ===
- Beef
- Buffy the Vampire Slayer
- Cock'd Gunns
- Electric Circus (2003–04)
- Empire Square (2005–06)
- Ergo Proxy (2006–07)
- Everybody Hates Chris (2014-2020)
- Kim's Convenience
- The L.A. Complex (2014-2017)
- LFL Football Night
- Malcolm & Eddie (2016-2021)
- Malcolm in the Middle (2018-2025)
- Miami Ink
- Ming's Dynasty (2021)
- The Mindy Project (2017-2020)
- Moesha (2016-2022)
- My Wife and Kids (2018-2026)
- The Parkers (2018-2022)
- The PJs (2010-2013)
- Sabrina the Teenage Witch (2020-2024)
- Scrubs (2009-2012)
- Sister, Sister (2016-2020)
- Tenjho Tenge (2007–08)
- V.I.P. (2007-2013)
- WTF Baron Davis
- Xbox E3 Briefing (2017-2019)
