= Brad Tiemann =

American filmmaker

Brad Tiemann is an American filmmaker who produces, directs, and writes feature films, short films, episodic television, and music videos. He is known as the executive producer of the Freeform series Movie Night With Karlie Kloss, MTV's Dare to Live, executive producer /director of the MTV series The Buried Life and MTV's animated comedy Greatest Party Story Ever.

== Early life and education ==
Born in Alton, Illinois, Brad Tiemann graduated Alton High School in 1989 and went on to graduate with an Economics degree from University of Illinois at Urbana–Champaign in 1993. He was a stockbroker in Chicago from 1993 to 1998 and then opened his own firm in St. Louis from 1998 until 2001. During his brokerage years, Tiemann made a comedic film about a nuclear holocaust, Golden Years, which was taste enough for him to uproot from Illinois and move to Los Angeles to begin his career in the film industry.

He attended film school at UCLA and HF.

== Career ==
Tiemann's directorial debut was a controversial short film about AIDS and euthanasia called Sunset. Tiemann wrote, directed, and produced the film, birthing his unique surreal, epic film style. It won the Audience Choice Award at the Damah Film Festival, in addition to securing a distribution deal which launched his writing and directing career.

After a bout of screenwriting, Tiemann's feature film Circle was greenlit. Tiemann wrote and produced the film and directed second unit while collaborating with Michael Watkins. Circle, a dark thriller featuring Silas Weir Mitchell, Gail O'Grady, and America Olivo, premiered on Showtime, receiving both domestic and foreign distribution deals during the Cannes Film Festival.

Immediately following Circle, Tiemann helped create, direct, and produce the feature-length documentary The Buried Life, a story of four twenty-something men on a road trip to complete life changing events from their own "bucket lists." It caught national attention and was acquired by MTV to be made into a television series. Tiemann directed two seasons of the groundbreaking documentary series, which resulted in a front-page article in The New York Times and an episode of the Oprah Winfrey Show.

In 2012, Tiemann was hired as director of photography for Bravo's Gallery Girls, a docu-drama that followed the lives of six young, twenty-something women working in New York City's hippest art galleries. Tiemann then went on to produce Married to the Army: Alaska, for 44 Blue Productions and the Oprah Winfrey Network (OWN). Married to the Army: Alaska took a deeper look into the lives of seven families and their sacrifices of deployment in Afghanistan. Married to the Army: Alaska was nominated and won a Gracie Award for Outstanding Reality Show. It was also nominated and won the Reality Wanted Award for Most Heartfelt Moment, and won the Hollywood Health and Society Award for Outstanding Reality Series.

In 2013, Tiemann continued on as supervising producer for Philly Throttle for Discovery, and produced four seasons of Bad Girls Club for the Emmy Award-winning Bunim/Murray Productions and Oxygen.

Tiemann went on to produce A&E's highly-profiled Mark Wahlberg reality series Breaking Boston. The series showcases the real women of Boston, featuring the day-to-day life of four tough, hard-as-nails women who juggle family, work, and relationships, all while remaining true to their way of life. Tiemann then went on to produce MTV's The Challenge. In 2014 Tiemann produced another inspirational feature documentary, Drop In, that followed paraplegic Jeremy McGhee on dangerous and exciting adventures teaching us that nothing should stop anyone from realizing their goals.

In 2015 and 2016 he helped create, produce, and direct the animated comedy Greatest Party Story Ever. He also created and executive produced Fuse's award-winning transgender series, Transcendent.

In 2016 Tiemann went to A&E backed Propagate Content, as Head of Production. Tiemann, along with its founder and former president of National Geographic Network, Howard T Owens, helped with the inception of the company in addition to building its development slate.

In 2017 he was hired as president and COO of THEOS, known for MTV's Dare to Live and Freeform's Movie Night With Karlie Kloss. Tiemann, along with founder and CEO Dave Lingwood, former star of MTV's The Buried Life, aim to create demographic-specific content, targeted at the Gen-Z and Millennial generations.

His most notable music video Is It Over by Thievery Corporation, starred Jason Thompson, Julie Marie Berman, and Lil Buck.

His short film, Owl Farm, about the alter ego of Hunter S. Thompson, was accepted to the Cannes Film Festival and New York International Film Festival.

Tiemann has produced and directed hundreds of episodes for A&E (TV channel), Bravo (U.S. TV network), Discovery Channel, MTV, Oxygen (TV channel), Oprah Winfrey Network, TruTV, Red Bull TV, and Sony Pictures.

== Awards and accomplishments ==
In 2013, Married to The Army: Alaska is nominated and wins the Gracie Award for Outstanding Reality Show, and is nominated and wins for the Reality Wanted Awards for Most Heartfelt Moment.

In 2013, Bad Girls Club is nominated at the Reality Wanted Awards for the Guilty Pleasure category.

In 2012, The Buried Life's book titled "What Do You Want To Do Before You Die?" became a New York Times #1 Best Seller and remained on the list for 4 weeks.

In 2011, The Buried Life again earned a nomination for the Do Something TV Show Award from the VH1 Do Something Awards.

In February 2011, The Buried Life was nominated for the 15th Annual Prism Awards. The PRISM Awards honor powerfully entertaining productions that realistically show substance abuse and addiction, as well as mental health issues.

In October 2010, The Buried Life helped make a $100,000 donation to the World Food Programme (Fighting Hunger World Wide).

In October 2010, The Buried Life set the record for the largest roulette spin in Vegas history placing a bet of $250,000 on black at The Golden Gate Casino. The previous record was set at $135,000 by radio personality Howard Stern.

In 2010, The Buried Life earned a nomination for the Do Something TV Show Award from the VH1 Do Something Awards. The Buried Life received a nomination for its efforts to encourage people to pursue their life goals.

In 2010, Tiemann joined The Buried Life as they appeared on The Oprah Winfrey Show where they helped a young girl conquer her fear of heights.
