= Juliya Chernetsky =

Television personality

Juliya Chernetsky Denning
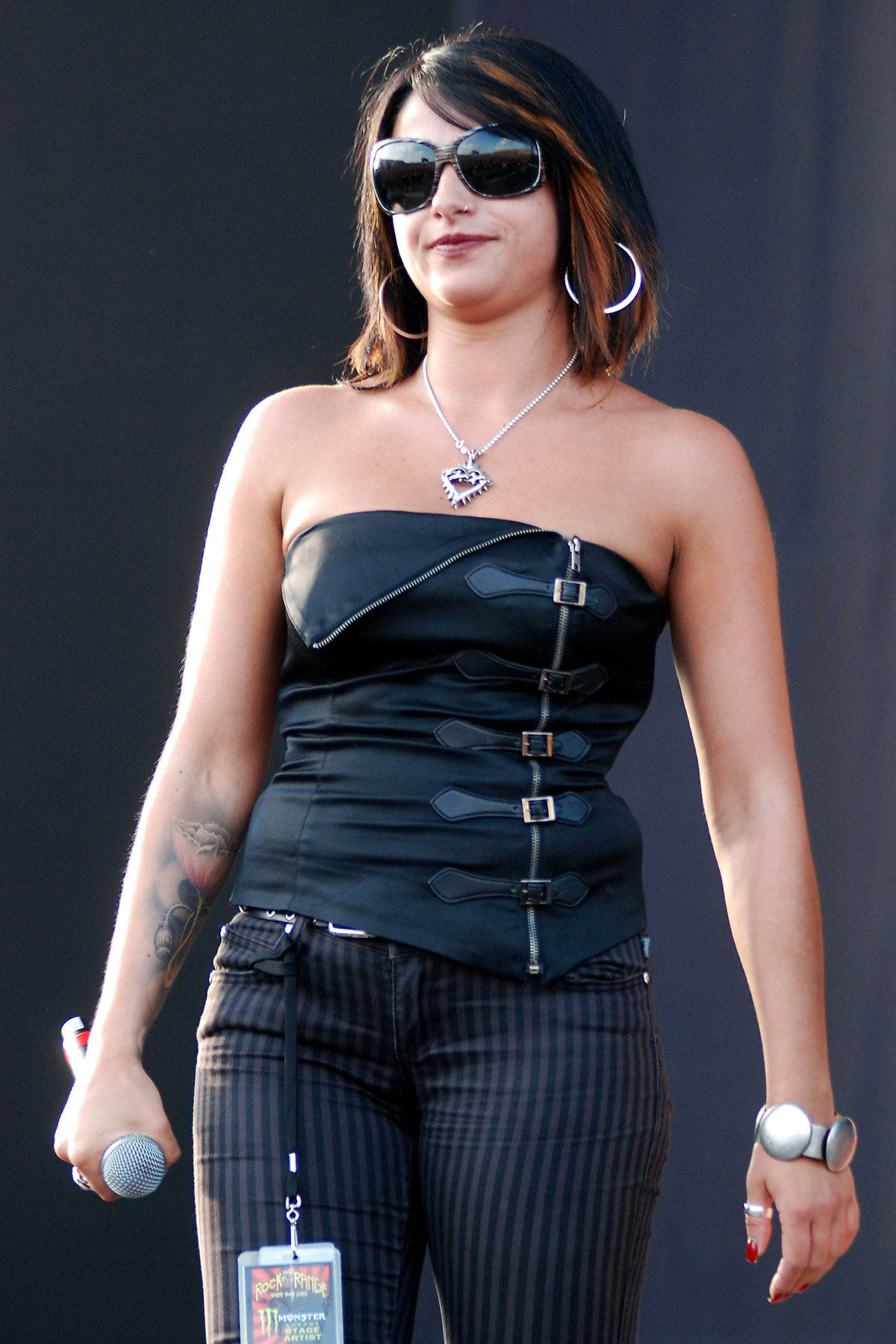
- Born: Juliya Chernetsky; July 10, 1982 (age 44); Kharkiv, Ukrainian SSR, Soviet Union
- Other names: Mistress Juliya; Juliya C. Juliya Denning

Juliya Chernetsky Denning (Ukrainian: Юлія Чернецька, Yulia Chernetska; born July 10, 1982), is a television personality best known for her stage name Mistress Juliya and the popularity on the music-themed network Fuse.

She also hosted the heavy metal-themed program Uranium and a call-in and email advice program called Slave to the Metal. She formerly hosted Fuse Top 20 Countdown along with several online programs that she self-promotes.

== Early life and career ==
Chernetsky was born in Ukraine and raised in Brooklyn, New York. She attended Fort Hamilton High School and Hunter College. She was a big fan of MMUSA and a frequent poster on their bulletin boards.

She was chosen to make her broadcast debut on the show Tastemakers. Her brashness made her an instant favorite, and after a year on Tastemakers, she moved on to host Uranium in June 2002.

Uranium would offer one of the few televised outlets for heavy metal music and become one of MMUSA's (which changed its name to Fuse TV in 2003) most popular programs.

Chernetsky's popularity led to the debut of a spin-off entitled Metal Asylum which followed a similar format and lasted over 100 episodes. Around this same time, she began hosting the music-themed advice show Slave to the Metal.

These programs allowed Chernetsky to interview many of the biggest names in heavy metal as well as her personal idols. Within these few years, she established herself as a fixture of music journalism and the metal community, gaining exposure for new bands and exclusive access to events such as the Ozzfest 10th anniversary. Chernetsky would also sporadically join the multi-hosted team on IMX which ran from 2003 to 2004.

On April 14, 2010, she announced over Twitter the death of Type O Negative frontman Peter Steele on her Twitter account, saying "Peter Steele passed today. I loved my friend...our idol...my heart is with his band and family..."

In 2011, Mistress Juliya hosted Welcome to Rockville in Jacksonville, Florida. She was also the host/MC of Rock on the Range 2011 in Columbus, Ohio, on May 22 and 23, introducing each band on the main stage. In July 2011, Juliya worked as tour correspondent for RockStar Mayhem Tour.

== Fuse ==
After over two years of being absent from Fuse, Juliya announced via Myspace her return to Fuse to do a weekly hard rock/metal countdown show. She also appeared on The Weekly Riff, a panel show hosted by Steven Smith. On September 22, 2008, she replaced Sami Jarroush as the host of No. 1 Countdown Rock.

Juliya is currently the co-host of Fuse Top 20 Countdown along with Allison Hagendorf. Fuse Top 20 Countdown is a countdown show of the 20 most popular rock, pop, hip-hop and R&B videos of the week that also features interviews with the artists behind the hits and the most popular celebrities of today.

== Filmography ==
Year	Film	Credit	Notes
2003	Uranium	Host	
2004	Electile Dysfunction	Host	
2005	Metal Asylum	Host	
2005	Ultimate Fuse Gig: The VJ Search	Host	
2009	Gothkill	Demonatrix	
2008	"#1 Countdown Rock"	Host	
2009	"Let It Rock"	Host	
2009	"Live from Voodoo Experience"	Host	
2010	"Fuse Top 20 Countdown"	Host	
2010	"Live from Lollapalooza"	Host	
