= The Buried Life =

Television series

- Genre: Reality television
- Directed by: Brad Tiemann
- Starring: Ben Nemtin; Dave Lingwood; Duncan Penn; Jonnie Penn
- Narrated by: Ben Nemtin (Season 1); Various (Season 2)
- Opening theme: "Ooh, Ahh (My Life Be Like)" by GRITS (feat. TobyMac) (Liquid Beats Remix) "Fix You" by Coldplay
- Country of origin: Canada
- Original language: English
- No. of seasons: 2
- No. of episodes: 18

Production
- Running time: approx. 22–24 minutes
- Production company: Reveille Productions

Original release
- Network: MTV
- Release: January 18 – November 29, 2010

The Buried Life is a reality documentary series on MTV. The series features Duncan Penn, Jonnie Penn, Ben Nemtin, and Dave Lingwood attempting to complete a list of "100 things to do before you die." The pilot episode aired on January 18, 2010, and the show was renewed for a second season in 2010. On October 25, 2011, The Buried Life announced they wouldn't be doing any more episodes of the show. Shortly after their show's cancellation, the creators said they were working on a "new and improved" show for the network based on the premise of the original series. No new details on a new series have since been released.

Penn, Lingwood, Penn and Nemtin released their first book as The Buried Life, "What Do You Want to Do Before You Die?" on March 27, 2012. On the week of April 15, 2012, the book climbed to #1 on The New York Times Best Seller List.

== Premise ==
The series focuses on four friends (Ben, Duncan, Jonnie and Dave) as they travel across North America in a purple transit bus named "Penelope" to complete a list of "100 things to do before you die." For every item they try to complete on their list, they help a stranger achieve one of their dreams and encourage others to go after their own lists. The series centered around the question: "What do you want to do before you die?" They have crossed off most of the numbers on their list. Episodes included completing tasks ranging from asking a girl out to surviving on a desert island.

== Background ==
The Buried Life is a company formed by four university students from Canada. The four grew up in Victoria, British Columbia located on Vancouver Island. The idea for the name originated from an 1852 Matthew Arnold poem entitled "The Buried Life".

The project filmed its first full feature documentary in the summer months of 2006 (August) and 2007 (August to October). The documentary is titled The Buried Life: What Do You Want To Do Before You Die? It tells the story of four friends who make a list of 100 things to do before they die and their journey across North America to accomplish it. The film was shot in locales throughout Canada and the United States including: British Columbia, California, Idaho, Nevada, Oregon, Texas and Washington, D.C.

In 2007 The Buried Life was offered a television show in Canada but ultimately turned it down citing they were not willing to give up creative control of the project.

On April 18, 2009, an article in The New York Times announced that a serial television version of their documentary titled The Buried Life was chosen by MTV for development. The show was selected as a flagship reality program that would usher in MTV's shift away from the superficial content currently dominating the network's programming, toward the production of more socially conscious media, something the Times dubbed "MTV for the era of Obama."

In an interview with Shave Magazine, Dave Lingwood revealed that MTV first found the boys on YouTube and later reached an agreement with them whereby they would film, edit and cut all the material themselves and send MTV "the finished product and they just air it."

== Reception ==
The Buried Life has been cited as an inspiration by some of the world's biggest social media stars and YouTube Influencers, including David Dobrock, The Yes Theory, Logan Paul, Jake Paul, The Nelk Boys, and Shawn Mendes. All have mentioned The Buried Life as an early influence. In 2011 Shawn Mendes entered The Buried Life's 5th Member contest.

=== Awards and nominations ===
In 2012 The Buried Life's book titled "What Do You Want To Do Before You Die?" became a NYT #1 Best Seller, it remained on the list for 4 weeks.

In May 2012, after making a bet with their fans, they sent a copy of their book titled "What Do You Want To Do Before You Die?" into space.

In April 2012 The Buried Life organized and set the Guinness Book World Record for the biggest speed dating event in history.

In 2010, The Buried Life earned a nomination for the Do Something TV Show Award from the VH1 Do Something Awards. The Buried Life received a nomination for its efforts to encourage people to pursue their life goals.

After originally failing in their attempts to play basketball against the President, in the spring of 2010 The Buried Life finally crossed off Playing Basketball with Obama during a visit to the White House.

In 2010 The Buried Life appeared on The Oprah Winfrey Show where they helped a young girl conquer her fear of heights.

In 2011, The Buried Life again earned a nomination for the Do Something TV Show Award from the VH1 Do Something Awards.

In October 2010 The Buried Life helped make a $100,000 donation to the World Food Programme (Fighting Hunger World Wide).

In October 2010 The Buried Life set the record for the largest roulette spin in Vegas history making a bet of $250,000 on black at The Golden Gate Casino. The previous record was set at $135,000 by radio personality Howard Stern.

In February 2011 The Buried Life were Nominated for the 15th annual Prism Awards. The PRISM Awards honor productions that are not only powerfully entertaining, but realistically show substance abuse and addiction, as well as mental health issues.

In July 2011, The Buried Life helped to make a $300,000 donation to The Keep America Beautiful foundation.

== Cast ==
- David Lingwood is a competitive break-dancer with a lust for life and adventure. He also briefly pursued a degree in sociology at Concordia University in Montreal. He was briefly married in Las Vegas, NV, crossing #91 off his bucket list: Get Married in Vegas. The marriage was later annulled.
- Ben Nemtin grew up playing sports and continued with athleticism throughout high school. After graduating, he was selected as a member of the Canadian National Rugby Team, and also earned academic and athletic scholarships to attend the University of Victoria, where he attended as a science major who then made a switch to major in business.
- Duncan Penn attended University of Victoria and later the John Molson School of Business, where he graduated with honors. After college he helped found a charity, OA Projects, which builds soccer programs for youth affected by war, and has made a positive impact on communities in Ecuador, Rwanda and Uganda.
- Jonnie Penn is enrolled at McGill University in Montreal, with a double major in History and English Literature. He is currently attending Cambridge University. Jonnie was a winner at the Sacramento Film Festival by the age of eighteen. In addition, he was also selected to represent the country of Canada at the Oxford University Debate Championships.

== Episodes ==
=== Season 1 (2010) ===
No. overall	No. in season	Title	Original release date	Off the list
1	1	"#6: Crash a Party at the Playboy Mansion"	January 18, 2010	check
The guys attempt to sneak into the Playboy Mansion as uninvited guests. Meanwhile, they help a group of underprivileged kids by providing their classroom with a new computer.
2	2	"#41: Make a Toast at a Stranger's Wedding"	January 25, 2010	check
The boys try to make a toast at a local wedding. Meanwhile, they help an artist get in touch with a son he hasn't seen in 17 years.
3	3	"#59: Ask Out the Girl of Your Dreams"	February 1, 2010	X mark
The boys try to crash the Transformers 2 red carpet and get Ben a date with Megan Fox. Meanwhile, they help a young girl get over her fear of rollercoasters. Appearances by Fox, Kendra Wilkinson, Jon Voight, Peter Cullen, Michael Bay and Isabel Lucas. Note: While they didn't get it off the list in this episode, they did get the item off the list in season 2, asking out Taylor Swift.
4	4	"#74: Help Deliver a Baby"	February 8, 2010	check
The boys try to find a woman that will allow them to help deliver her baby. Meanwhile, they help a young woman travel to Denver to see her mom's grave site for the first time.
5	5	"#33: Compete in a Krump Competition"	February 15, 2010	check
The boys try to learn how to krump and enter a contest. Meanwhile, they try to help a young man get one of his songs on the radio.
6	6	"#95: Play Ball with Obama"	February 22, 2010	X mark
The boys try to get a game of basketball going with President Obama. Meanwhile, they help get a group of old friends together to bring back old memories. Appearances by Sens. Claire McCaskill (D-Mo.) and Frank Lautenberg (D-N.J., face blurred), Reps. Baron Hill (D-Ind.) and Mike Quigley (D-Ill.), and Transportation Secretary Ray LaHood. Note: While they didn't play ball with him in this episode, Obama accepted their offer and played a game of basketball with the boys later that April.
7	7	"#18: Tell a Joke on Late Night Television"	March 1, 2010	check
The boys try to sneak onto a late night television show to tell a joke. Meanwhile, they try to help a man who was blinded by a motorcycle accident re-live his favorite childhood pastime.
8	8	"#85: Throw the Most Badass Party Ever"	March 8, 2010	check
The boys find themselves in San Luis Obispo, CA and try to throw the most badass party with a guest appearance by Naughty by Nature. Meanwhile, they try to reunite an adopted man with his birth father.

=== Season 2 (2010) ===
No. overall	No. in season	Title	Original release date	Off the list
9	1	"#50: Streak a Stadium and Get Away With It"	September 27, 2010	X mark
The guys attempt to run naked across a soccer stadium. Meanwhile, Dave and Jonnie help a girl build a ramp in a local skate park in honor of her dead best friend. This is in Douglas, WY. Note: While not crossing this one off the list, they unintentionally crossed off another list item (Spend a Night in Jail).
10	2	"#59: Ask Out The Girl of Your Dreams (Part II)"	October 4, 2010	check
In a continuation of the first season episode, Duncan attempts to ask out Taylor Swift. Meanwhile, Jonnie is back home in Victoria, BC to help fulfill a man's dream of finding his long lost love.
11	3	"#91: Get Married in Vegas"	October 11, 2010	check
The guys are looking for love when Dave falls for a girl and decides to ask her to marry him in Las Vegas. Meanwhile, Jonnie and Duncan help a homeless man reunite with his daughter.
12	4	"#25: Capture a Fugitive"	October 18, 2010	check
The guys put their lives in danger when they try to cross another item off the list: capture a fugitive. Meanwhile, Duncan and Ben help a band get signed onto a record label.
13	5	"#48: Accept a Dare (Steal a Lock of Robert Pattinson's Hair)"	October 25, 2010	check
Trying to cross another item off their list, the guys follow Robert Pattinson around Hollywood and try to steal a lock of his hair. Meanwhile, Ben travels to Minnesota to help a girl create a rally to discuss the subject of depression.
14	6	"#88: Escape From A Deserted Island"	November 1, 2010	check
There is no civilization on the islands of Aitutaki in the South Pacific. Once dropped there, the boys have to make their way to civilization without any possessions other than the sole item each is authorized to bring. They will face several serious challenges, including feeding themselves, maintaining their sanity, and avoiding natural dangers along the way.
15	7	"#97: Get In A Fight"	November 8, 2010	check
Dave competes in an MMA fight in Los Angeles. Meanwhile, one of the boys partners with a girl from Florida in riding motorcycles up the Floridian coast in honor of her late father, whose ashes are sent into the ocean at a beach upon the end of the ride.
16	8	"#2: Crash a Parade"	November 15, 2010	check
The guys head to Des Moines to crash the Iowa State Fair Parade, where they'll perform a Ferris Bueller-inspired song-and-dance routine. Meanwhile, Jonnie helps an environmental activist orchestrate a protest in Canada.
17	9	"#75: Make a Million Dollars (Part I)"	November 29, 2010	X mark
The boys all split up with $25,000 in hand in attempts to make a million dollars. Meanwhile, Jonnie helps a boy they had met in a previous speaking engagement find a home for his father.
18	10	"#75: Make a Million Dollars (Part II)"	November 29, 2010	X mark
After the boys' individual efforts prove to not work, they head off to Vegas in hopes of accomplishing their goal of making a million dollars. Meanwhile, they surprise a girl with the funds to help her make a difference in her native country. The guys end the episode with donating all money earned to The World Food Program in an effort to help end hunger in Nicaragua.

== The book ==
What Do You Want to Do Before You Die? by The Buried Life, Jonnie Penn, Dave Lingwood, Duncan Penn and Ben Nemtin was published and released by Artisan Books on March 27, 2012. The illustrated paperback chronicles The Buried Life's ongoing journey to complete their list of 100 things and to inspire others to make their own list. "Our goal was to give people the feeling that you can do anything," said Jonnie Penn. "We started with that. We scribbled down the ones that moved us ... Some are sad, some are hilarious, some are scandalous. We wanted to get that balance.". The premise of the book surrounds list items sent to them by viewers. A select few were chosen and incorporated into the book as depicted by an artist. The book also contains personal accounts from Ben, Jonnie, Duncan and Dave, each explaining personal stories leading to the creation of the group. The book became a #1 New York Times Bestseller shortly after its release, crossing off number 19 on their list.

== The original list ==
- 1.) ~~Open the six o'clock news~~
- 2.) ~~Lead a parade~~
- 3.) ~~Get a tattoo~~
- 4.) ~~Start a dance in a public place~~
- 5.) ~~Go down a mountain on a long board~~
- 6.) ~~Crash a party at the Playboy Mansion~~
- 7.) ~~Plant a tree~~
- 8.) ~~Ride a bull~~
- 9.) ~~Destroy a computer~~
- 10.) ~~Learn to fly~~
- 11.) ~~Get a college degree~~
- 12.) ~~Kick a field goal~~
- 13.) ~~Help someone build a house~~
- 14.) ~~Grow a mustache~~
- 15.) Get on the cover of Rolling Stone
- 16.) ~~Drive across North America~~
- 17.) ~~Start a huge wave~~
- 18.) ~~Tell a joke on Late Night Television~~
- 19.) ~~Write a bestselling book~~
- 20.) ~~Get a song we've written on the radio~~
- 21.) ~~Become a licensed minister~~
- 22.) ~~Approach the most beautiful girl you've ever seen and kiss her~~
- 23.) ~~Learn how to play an instrument~~
- 24.) ~~Go to a rock concert in all leather~~
- 25.) ~~Solve a crime or capture a fugitive~~
- 26.) Tell a judge: "You want the truth? You can't handle the truth!"
- 27.) ~~Give a stranger a $100 bill~~
- 28.) ~~Send a message in a bottle~~
- 29.) ~~Scream at the top of your lungs~~
- 30.) ~~Make a big donation to charity~~
- 31.) ~~Cut a ribbon at a major opening~~
- 32.) ~~Get something named after you~~
- 33.) ~~Compete in a Krump Competition~~
- 34.) ~~Pay for someone's groceries~~
- 35.) ~~Sing the National Anthem to a packed stadium~~
- 36.) ~~Throw the first pitch at a major league baseball game~~
- 37.) ~~Win and yell "Bingo!" at a Bingo hall~~
- 38.) ~~Kiss the Stanley Cup~~
- 39.) ~~Stand under a plane while it lands~~
- 40.) ~~Make the front page of a newspaper~~
- 41.) ~~Make a toast at a stranger's wedding~~
- 42.) ~~Spend a night in jail~~
- 43.) ~~Become a knight for a day~~
- 44.) ~~Catch something and eat it~~
- 45.) ~~Sleep in a haunted house~~
- 46.) ~~Do a sketch with Will Ferrell~~
- 47.) ~~Get in the Guinness Book of World Records~~
- 48.) ~~Accept a dare~~
- 49.) ~~Take a stranger out to dinner~~
- 50.) ~~Streak a field~~ and get away with it
- 51.) ~~Climb a large mountain~~
- 52.) ~~Go on a blind date~~
- 53.) ~~Make television show~~
- 54.) ~~Donate blood~~
- 55.) Kiss Rachel McAdams
- 56.) ~~Write an article for a major publication~~
- 57.) ~~Spend a week in silence~~
- 58.) ~~See a dead body~~
- 59.) ~~Ask out the girl of your dreams~~
- 60.) ~~Go paragliding~~
- 61.) ~~Draw a mural~~
- 62.) ~~Protest something~~
- 63.) ~~Run a successful business~~
- 64.) ~~Visit Folsom Prison~~
- 65.) ~~Learn how to sail~~
- 66.) ~~Walk the red carpet~~
- 67.) ~~Make an important speech~~
- 68.) ~~Swim with sharks~~
- 69.) ~~Smash a guitar on stage~~
- 70.) ~~Compete in a soap-box derby~~
- 71.) ~~Take a kid on a shopping spree~~
- 72.) ~~Throw a surprise party~~
- 73.) ~~Make a music video~~
- 74.) ~~Help deliver a baby~~
- 75.) ~~Make a million bucks~~
- 76.) ~~Go dog sledding~~
- 77.) ~~Go to Burning Man~~
- 78.) ~~Fall in love~~
- 79.) Dance with Ellen DeGeneres
- 80.) ~~Meet the Lonely Island dudes~~
- 81.) ~~Tour with a major band~~
- 82.) ~~Win an award~~
- 83.) ~~Street perform and make $100~~
- 84.) ~~Run a marathon~~
- 85.) ~~Throw the most bad-ass party ever~~
- 86.) ~~Teach an elementary school class~~
- 87.) Pay off our parents' mortgage
- 88.) ~~Escape from a deserted island~~
- 89.) Experience zero gravity
- 90.) ~~Ride a roller coaster~~
- 91.) Get married ~~(in Las Vegas)~~
- 92.) ~~Learn how to surf~~
- 93.) ~~Ride through the desert in a dune-buggy~~
- 94.) ~~Party with a rock star~~
- 95.) ~~Play ball with President Barack Obama~~
- 96.) ~~Host a lemonade stand~~
- 97.) ~~Be in a fight~~
- 98.) ~~Race horses~~
- 99.) Host Saturday Night Live
- 100.) Go to space
