= Metal Asylum =

American television program

- Genre: Music
- Presented by: Mistress Juliya
- Opening theme: "What if I Lost it" by Bloodsimple
- Country of origin: United States
- Original language: English

Production
- Producer: Jason Haitkin
- Production locations: New York, other locations
- Running time: 30 minutes

Original release
- Network: Fuse
- Release: May 1, 2005 – 2006

Related
- Uranium

Metal Asylum is an American television program about heavy metal on Fuse. Hosted by Mistress Juliya, it served as a slightly subtler incarnation of the popular Uranium and even coexisted with it under the same host. Metal Asylum traditionally ran a half-hour, typically on a nightly basis at 11pm ET, and deemphasized band interviews in favor of simply playing music videos, largely of the heavy metal genre. The show's production ended in 2006 due to Chernetsky's departure from Fuse TV.

== Overview ==
In contrast to Uranium, interviews were rare. A typical episode of Metal Asylum would have Chernetsky standing solo in a shady lit studio, briefly discussing bands before playing their videos. As opposed to Uranium where Chernetsky could fly off the cuff most of the time, on Metal Asylum she read off a script on a teleprompter. The scripts were written by legendary metal TV producer Jason Haitkin (who also had a hand in Uranium and Headbangers Ball and also directed videos for bands). The show's opening title sequence featured Chernetsky pushing through twisted black graphics, and the intro guitar to Bloodsimple's "What if I Lost it" served as its theme music.

Metal Asylum did include exclusive videos and helped break out some underground bands like Municipal Waste and The Red Chord. Phil Demmel from Machine Head confessed that he first found out about Municipal Waste from watching Metal Asylum. The program also interviewed veteran musicians like Geezer Butler and Pedro Howse of GZR.

In September 2005, the show was guest hosted on two occasions while Chernetsky was on vacation. Mark Hunter of Chimaira and Howard Jones of Killswitch Engage each hosted two shows. Jones also interviewed Throwdown on one episodes.

== Special episodes ==
On August 16, 2005, Fuse TV announced its selection to become the exclusive cable television broadcast partner for the 10th anniversary of Ozzfest. As such, Metal Asylum would feature the "Ozzfest Video of the Day" on a nightly basis during the tour. On August 19 at 9pm ET, Fuse also premiered Ozzfest 2005: Uranium Invasion followed by Ozzfest 2005: Fuse's Metal Mayhem at 9:30pm ET, which provided coverage of second stage acts. Bands interviewed included Mastodon, Black Label Society, In Flames, and As I Lay Dying.

On November 14, 2005, the 100th episode featured interviews with Strapping Young Lad, Suffocation, and the first North American television interview of Decapitated. It also featured their live performance of "Spheres of Madness" at B. B. King's in New York City. It is one of the only available American television interviews with Vitek from Decapitated before he died in a van accident in 2007.

A Christmas episode, known as the "lost episode," was filmed but never aired. This edition featured mostly Satanic videos such as Deicide's "Scars of the Crucifix." It never aired due to a miscommunication about being pre-empted for Christmas.

== Cancellation ==
In February 2006, Metal Asylum disappeared from the air without any explanation from the network or Chernetsky herself. In early March 2006, the Fuse TV website was redesigned and Chernetsky along with fellow Fuse VJ Adonis Thompson were not on the list. Broadcasts of the F-List were played in Metal Asylum's timeslot during the month of February, and on the Fuse message board, it was stated that her contract had not been renewed which irked many loyal viewers. Previous rumors had stated that Chernetsky's absence was due to her recovering from surgery; however, Chernetsky confirmed her exit from Fuse via her MySpace page and details the fact Fuse wanted to become more family-friendly and none of her programs exhibited that quality, and she was then removed.

Despite legal conflicts between Chernetsky and Fuse, she later rejoined the network and went on to host the Rock edition of No. 1 Countdown.

== See also ==
- Headbangers Ball
