= The Next: Fame Is at Your Doorstep =

- Genre: Reality
- Presented by: Allison Hagendorf
- Starring: Gloria Estefan; Joe Jonas; John Rich; Nelly
- Country of origin: United States
- Original language: English
- No. of seasons: 1
- No. of episodes: 10

Production
- Producers: Dave Broome; Queen Latifah; Shakim Compere
- Production companies: 25/7 Productions; Flavor Unit Entertainment; Warner Horizon Television; Raquel Productions

Original release
- Network: The CW
- Release: August 16 – October 4, 2012

The Next: Fame Is at Your Doorstep is an American hour-long reality series on The CW television network that consists of a music competition to find new talent, the winner of the competition will receive a recording contract with Atlantic Records. The show is produced by CBS's Raquel Productions in association with 25/7 Productions, LLC and Flavor Unit Entertainment, Inc, and it is produced by Dave Broome (The Biggest Loser), Shakim Compere, and Queen Latifah. The series premiered on August 16, 2012.

== Format ==
In each episode of The Next, four mentors drop in on the lives of four up-and-coming local musicians. When the session is up, the four newly groomed artists go head-to-head at a well-known local venue. with the audience consisting of friends and family, as well as local music fans. The winner moves on to represent their city in the semi-finals.

== Mentors ==
The mentors of The Next

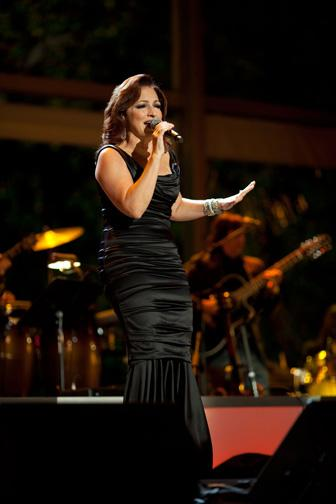
Gloria Estefan

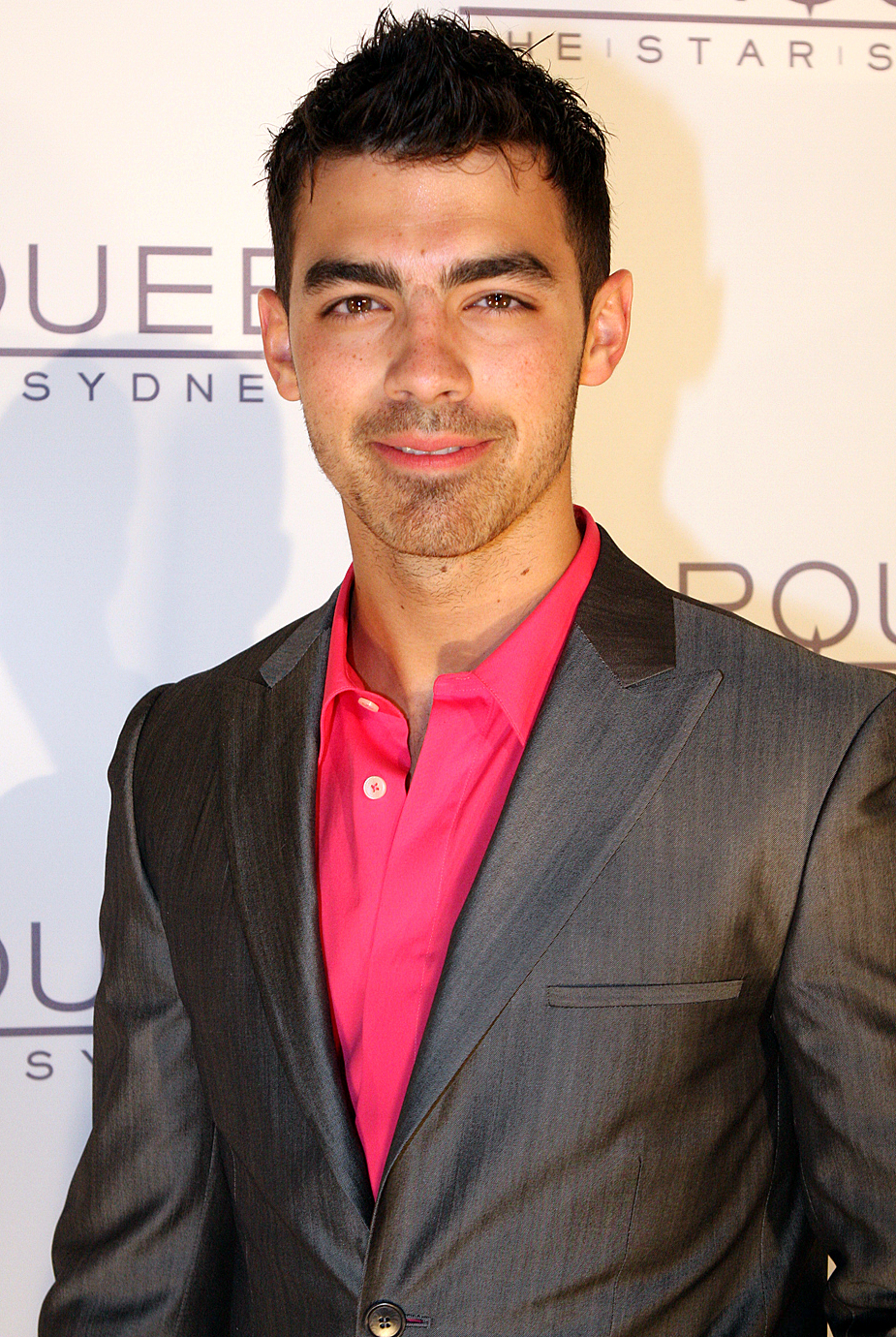
Joe Jonas

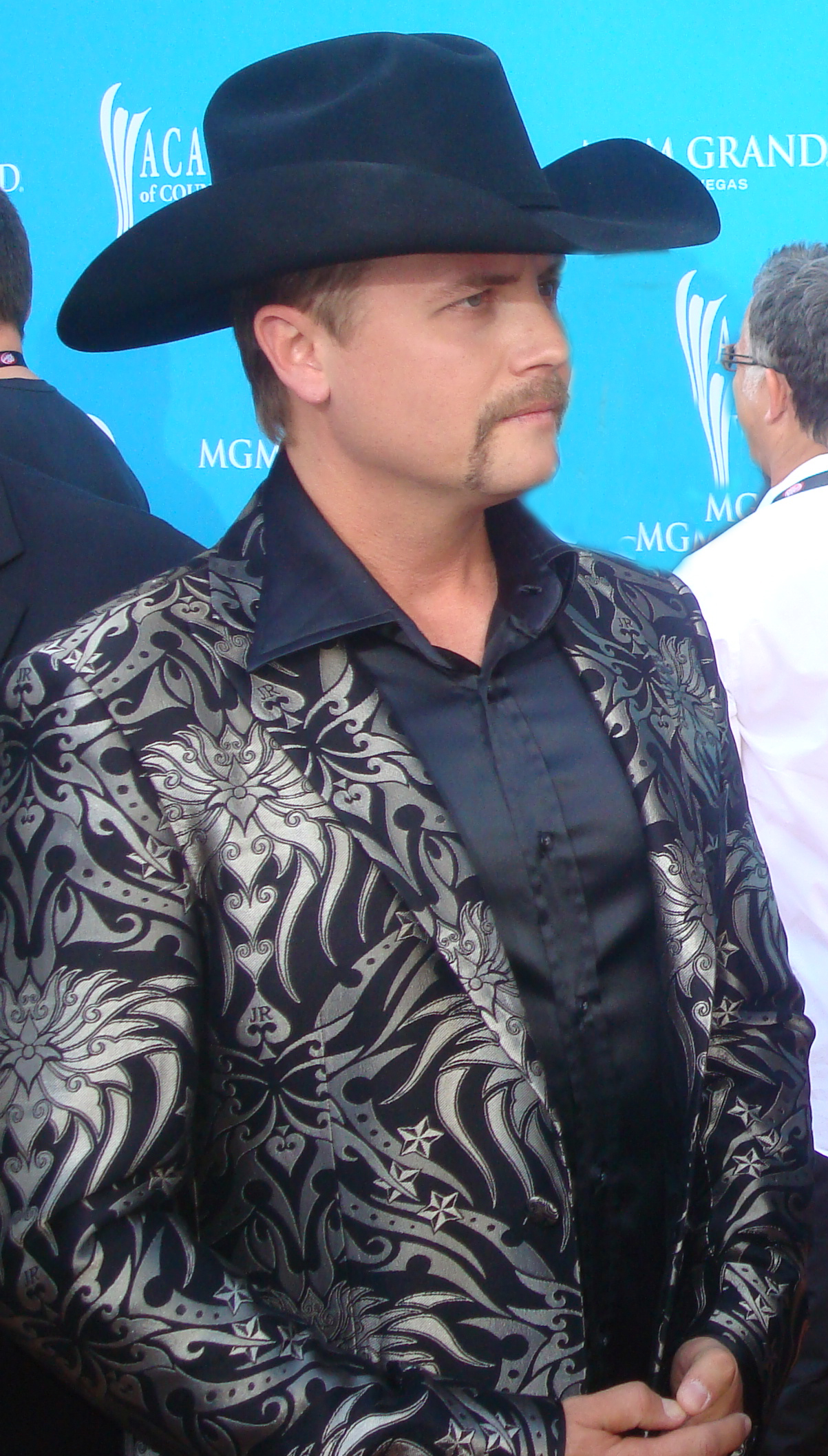
John Rich

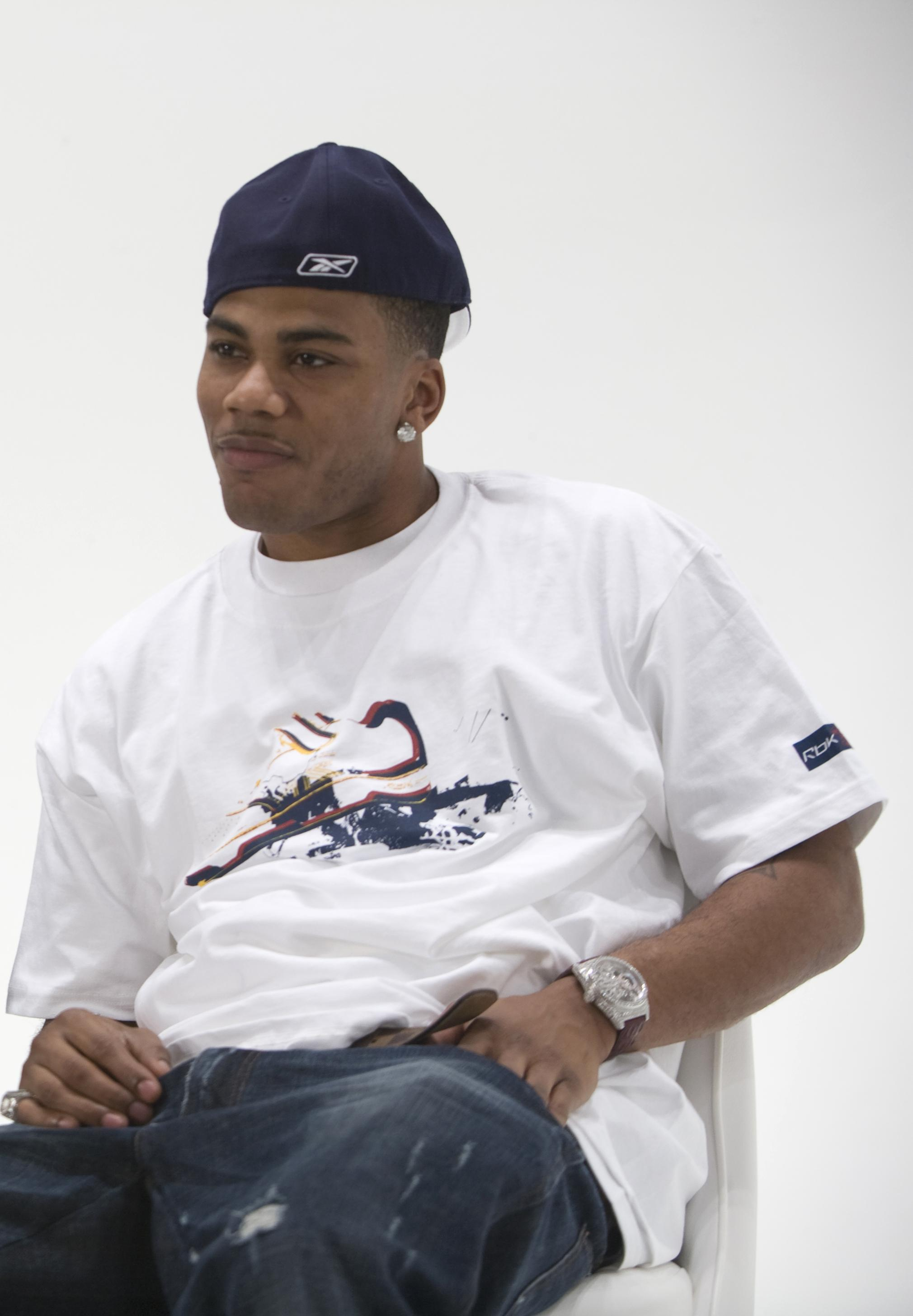
Nelly

Gloria Estefan was invited to form part of the main cast, liking the idea mainly because she would not judge, but help the contestant make a good presentation onstage.

Though Joe Jonas was about to say no to the project, mostly due to a busy schedule, the producers were persistent. After arranging a meeting with him, they gave Jonas a spiel of the show, raising the interest for the program, due to the way it would be directed and for giving the opportunity to new artists the chances they deserved.

Rapper Nelly was invited personally by producer Dave Broome to the show, and though he wasn't sure at the beginning, it was the original direction different from other music competition shows which made him accept the mentoring role.

John Rich, an accomplished country music singer/songwriter, producer, and one half of the duo Big & Rich, provided most of the personality for the show. Known for being offbeat, Rich's mentorship was often the highlight of each episode. In the end, it would be a performer mentored by Rich who would end up winning the competition. Rich also performed the most of any of the mentors, being featured 3 of the 5 times. These performances displayed Rich's talents in a variety of formats as he sang and played lead guitar with Nelly on a powerful rendition of "American Woman", then did "Superstition" with Gloria Estefan, and in the final episode performed the inspiring "That's Why I Pray" with Big & Rich partner Kenny Alphin.

== Auditions ==
The following table contains all the contestants of the season and the song they performed. The participants highlighted in green were chosen by the public in each city to continue to the next round. The participant highlighted in blue was chosen by the public as a wildcard to continue to the next round.

Mentors	Cities					
Mentors	Orlando	Baltimore	New York	Chicago	Dallas	Los Angeles
Gloria Estefan	Cori Yarckin "The Edge of Glory"	Shannon Ramsey "What Doesn't Kill You (Stronger)"	Ali Brustofski "When I Look At You"	Iliana Incandela "Set Fire to the Rain"	Remington "Stutter"	Angela Mukul "You and I"
Joe Jonas	Tayler Buono "Secrets"	Jordan Baird "Not Over You"	Frankie Z "In My Head"	Julian Bell "Waiting on the World to Change"	Jordana "So What"	Jeremy Crooks "DJ Got Us Fallin' in Love"
John Rich	Michael Ray "Springsteen"	Jenny Leigh "Gunpowder and Lead"	A-Wall "Sexy Love"	Janelle Kroll "Together Again"	Erica Perry "Redneck Woman"	Tilky Jones "Fine By Me"
Nelly	Itzy Rodríguez "Firework"	Chris Bivins "More"	Baiyu "Big Girls Don't Cry"	Jabari "Grenade"	Ashley Kimbrae "Price Tag"	Krystle Cruz "Mamma Knows Best"

== Semifinals ==
The first round of the semifinals were broadcast live on The CW from the Orpheum Theater in Los Angeles on September 27. Jordan Baird, Ali Brustofski, Krystle Cruz, Iliana, Ashley Kimbrae, Michael Ray were selected from their respective cities to compete.

Mentor	Artist	Song
Joe Jonas	Jordan Baird	"This Love"
Gloria Estefan	Ali Brustofski	"Breakeven"
Nelly	Krystle Cruz	"Born This Way"
Gloria Estefan	Iliana Incandela	"King of Anything"
Nelly	Ashley Kimbrae	"Wide Awake"
John Rich	Michael Ray	"Drunk On You"
Gloria Estefan	Cori Yarckin	"Want U Back"

== Finals ==
Semifinalist Michael Ray, mentored by John Rich, was already voted to perform at the final night, that same night Iliana, mentored by Gloria Estefan was voted as the second semifinalist for the final round. Performances for the third candidates were made, getting Jordan Baird mentored by Joe Jonas, the most public votes to make it to the finale.

Michael, who had John Rich as his mentor, sang Barefoot Blue Jean Night by Jake Owen. He sounded just like he should have an album out already. Iliana decided to choose an older song. She came out to sing Will You Still Love Me Tomorrow. The mentors thought it was a gamble, but they loved it. Jordan impressed Joe with a Ne-Yo song, and he even got the girls in the audience screaming.

Before the winner was announced, some bloopers were shown from the previous few weeks, and the seven contestants came back on stage together to sing Good Life. The mentors also showed off their talent by singing Tell Me Something Good.

After the votes were counted, the winner of The Next was Michael Ray. Michael will be getting that record contract with Atlantic Records.

Mentor	Artist	Song	Result
Joe Jonas	Jordan Baird	"When I Get You Alone"	Public's vote
Gloria Estefan	Ali Brustofski	"Give Your Heart a Break"	Eliminated
Nelly	Krystle Cruz	"Since U Been Gone"	Eliminated
Nelly	Ashley Kimbrae	"Rolling In The Deep"	Eliminated
Gloria Estefan	Cori Yarckin	"Poker Face"	Wildcard / Eliminated

== Performances by guests/coaches ==
No.	Episode	Performer(s)	Title	Hot 100 reaction	Hot Digital Songs reaction	Performance type
1	Baltimore	Gloria Estefan & Joe Jonas	"Every Little Thing She Does Is Magic"	Not released	Not released	Live performance
2	New York	Nelly & John Rich	"American Woman"	Not released	Not released	Live performance
3	Chicago	Gloria Estefan & John Rich	"Superstition"	Not released	Not released	Live performance
4	Dallas	Nelly & Joe Jonas	"Every Little Step"	Not released	Not released	Live performance
5	Los Angeles	Big & Rich	"That's Why I Pray"	#82	Not charted	Live performance

== Ratings ==
No.	Title	Original air date	Rating/Share (18–49)	U.S. viewers (millions)
1	"Orlando"	August 16, 2012	0.3/1	0.85
2	"Baltimore"	August 23, 2012	0.3/1	0.81
3	"New York"	August 30, 2012	0.3/1	0.77
4	"Chicago"	September 6, 2012	0.3/1	0.63
5	"Dallas"	September 13, 2012	0.2/1	0.66
6	"Los Angeles"	September 20, 2012	0.3/1	0.78
7	"Semifinals, Round 1"	September 27, 2012	0.3/1	0.69
8	"Semifinals, Round 2"	October 2, 2012	0.3/1	0.63
9/10	"Finale"	October 4, 2012	0.2/1	0.64

== Media sponsorship ==
Cricket Wireless is the main presenter of the music competition. The Next interacts with Cricket smartphones, using Muve Music and prepares them for the competition by exploring music playlists for inspiration or by selecting songs to perform. Muve Music will be featured prominently in the reality series.
