= Fuse Top 20 Countdown =

Fuse Top 20 Countdown was a weekly music countdown show on American TV network Fuse. It is hosted by Allison Hagendorf and Juliya Chernetsky and brings viewers the latest music news, videos and musician and celebrity interviews.

== List of #1s ==
2010:

Issue date	Song	Artist
April 2	"Imma Be"	The Black Eyed Peas
April 9	"Telephone"	Lady Gaga featuring Beyoncé
April 16	"Telephone"	Lady Gaga featuring Beyoncé
April 23	"Rude Boy"	Rihanna
April 30	"Nothin' on You	B.o.B
May 7	"OMG"	Usher featuring will.i.am
May 14	"OMG"	Usher featuring will.i.am
May 21	"OMG"	Usher featuring will.i.am
May 28	no show	
June 4	"OMG"	Usher featuring will.i.am
June 11	"Young Forever"	Jay-Z featuring Mr. Hudson
June 18	no show	
June 25	no show	
July 2	no regular countdown	
July 9	"California Gurls"	Katy Perry featuring Snoop Dogg
July 16	"California Gurls"	Katy Perry featuring Snoop Dogg
July 23	"California Gurls"	Katy Perry featuring Snoop Dogg
July 30	"California Gurls"	Katy Perry featuring Snoop Dogg
August 6	"California Gurls"	Katy Perry featuring Snoop Dogg
August 13	"Love The Way You Lie"	Eminem featuring Rihanna
August 20	"Love The Way You Lie"	Eminem featuring Rihanna
August 27	no regular countdown	
September 3	"Dynamite"	Taio Cruz
September 10	"Teenage Dream"	Katy Perry
September 17	no regular countdown	
September 24	"Teenage Dream"	Katy Perry
October 1	"Just The Way You Are"	Bruno Mars
October 8	"Just The Way You Are"	Bruno Mars
October 15	"Like A G6"	Far East Movement featuring The Cataracs and Dev
October 22	"Just A Dream"	Nelly
October 29	"Like A G6"	Far East Movement featuring The Cataracs and Dev
November 5	"Like A G6"	Far East Movement featuring The Cataracs and Dev
November 12	"Like A G6"	Far East Movement featuring The Cataracs and Dev
November 19	"Like A G6"	Far East Movement featuring The Cataracs and Dev
November 26	no show	
December 3	Firework"	Katy Perry
December 10	Firework"	Katy Perry
December 17
December 24
December 31

2011:

Issue date	Song	Artist
January 4	no countdown	
January 11	no countdown	
January 18	no countdown	
January 25	no countdown	
February 1	no countdown	
February 8	"Grenade"	Bruno Mars
February 15	no regular countdown	
February 22	"Fuckin' Perfect	P!nk
March 1	"S&M"	Rihanna
March 8	"S&M"	Rihanna
March 15	"S&M"	Rihanna
March 22	"S&M"	Rihanna
March 29	"S&M"	Rihanna
April 5		
April 12
April 19

2012:

Issue date	Song	Artist
January 3	"Sexy And I Know It"	LMFAO
January 10	"We Found Love"	Rihanna
January 24	"Good Feeling	Flo Rida
January 31	"Set Fire To The Rain"	Adele
