= Hoppus on Music =

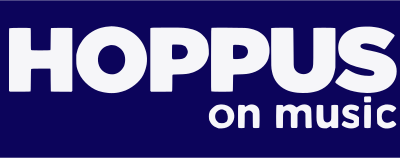
- Starring: Mark Hoppus; Amy Schumer
- Country of origin: United States
- Original language: English
- No. of seasons: 5
- No. of episodes: 56

Production
- Running time: 1 hour

Original release
- Network: Fuse
- Release: September 16, 2010 – May 17, 2012

Hoppus On Music, previously titled A Different Spin with Mark Hoppus, is a talk show hosted by Blink-182 and +44 singer/bassist Mark Hoppus. The show premiered on September 16, 2010, on Fuse, and lasted until May 17, 2012. The show formerly featured comedian Amy Schumer as the co-host.

== Background ==
The show focused on music news, humorous panel discussions and special reports from the show's correspondents. The show also featured musical performances by both mainstream and emerging bands. On January 18, 2011, Mark Hoppus announced via Twitter, that the show was renamed to, Hoppus On Music.

The show’s first press release was on June 22, 2010. Mark Hoppus stated "I am stoked to join the Fuse family and have a show where I can talk about a topic that I'm passionate about, music. More importantly, I'm excited to force millions of people to watch me on a weekly basis on national television." According to Fuse senior vice president of programming and development Sal LoCurto, "A Different Spin with Mark Hoppus was developed to complement the wide variety of music programming on Fuse - including live concerts, festival coverage and in-depth interview series with the biggest names in music."

On August 5, 2010, Hoppus revealed the co-host of the show would be comedian Amy Schumer. There is often a regular panel, where they discuss hot topics on music, with such guests as Andrew WK regularly talking on it. On December 11, 2011, Hoppus welcomed bandmate Tom DeLonge's band Angels & Airwaves, on which Mark joked he "cheats" on him with.

The show's last episode aired on May 17, 2012, with Hoppus announcing the show's cancellation in December 2012, stating that the show had become too expensive for Fuse to produce.

== List of episodes ==
Episode	Premiere date	Guest	Performance
101	September 16, 2010	John Mayer	Neon Trees
102	September 23, 2010	Linkin Park	The National
103	September 30, 2010	N.E.R.D.	Trey Songz
104	October 7, 2010	Phil Collins	Travie McCoy
105	October 14, 2010	Thomas Mars	Jimmy Eat World
106	October 21, 2010	Black Cards and Alex Gaskarth	Bruno Mars
107	October 28, 2010	Nelly and Atomic Tom	Far East Movement
108	November 4, 2010	Slash and Tom Green	Hey Monday
109	November 11, 2010	Cee Lo Green and Good Charlotte	Cee Lo Green
110	November 18, 2010	Kid Cudi and Mumford and Sons	Motion City Soundtrack
111	December 2, 2010	Ben Folds	My Chemical Romance
112	December 9, 2010	Ozzy Osbourne and The Damned Things	The Gaslight Anthem
113	December 16, 2010	Flo Rida	Bruno Mars (via video backing), Travie McCoy, and Mark Hoppus with Ben Folds
201	February 18, 2011	Buckcherry	The Damned Things
202	February 25, 2011	Davey Havok	Fitz and the Tantrums
203	March 4, 2011	Topher Grace	Ra Ra Riot
204	March 11, 2011	Taylor Momsen	The Get Up Kids
205	March 18, 2011	Alice Cooper and Rob Zombie	A Day To Remember
206	March 25, 2011	Butch Trucks and Steve Martin	Steve Martin and the Steep Canyon Rangers
207	April 1, 2011	Snoop Dogg w/ appearance by Travis Barker	Wiz Khalifa
208	April 8, 2011	Mike Posner and 2AM Club	Airborne Toxic Event
209	April 15, 2011	Foo Fighters	The Pretty Reckless
210	May 6, 2011	Fabolous and Yellowcard	Runner Runner
211	May 13, 2011	Taking Back Sunday and The Ready Set	The Ready Set
301	June 10, 2011	Tinie Tempah	Death Cab For Cutie
302	June 17, 2011	Jack Osbourne	All Time Low
303	June 24, 2011	Simple Plan	Awolnation
304	July 8, 2011	Beady Eye	We the Kings
305	July 15, 2011	Kid Rock and Carney	Tinie Tempah
306	July 22, 2011	Chad Smith and Flea	Theophilus London
307	July 29, 2011	They Might Be Giants	They Might Be Giants
308	August 5, 2011	Matthew Morrison	3 Doors Down
309	August 12, 2011	Corey Taylor	The Antlers
310	August 19, 2011	Jeremih	Manchester Orchestra
311	August 26, 2011	My Chemical Romance	My Chemical Romance
401	October 28, 2011	J. Cole	J. Cole
402	November 4, 2011	Gym Class Heroes w/ appearance by Andrew WK	The Naked and Famous
403	November 11, 2011	Yelawolf w/ appearance by Deadmau5	Yelawolf
404	November 18, 2011	Noel Gallagher	The Joy Formidable
405	December 2, 2011	Patrick Stump	Patrick Stump
406	December 9, 2011	Angels & Airwaves	(no performance)
407	December 16, 2011	Matt & Kim	Childish Gambino
501	February 16, 2012	Young the Giant	Young the Giant
502	February 23, 2012	Billy Eichner and Dia Frampton	(no performance)
503	March 1, 2012	Damian Kulash from OK Go	Good Old War
504	March 8, 2012	Neon Hitch	(no performance)
505	March 15, 2012		Imagine Dragons
506	March 22, 2012	Ricky Wilson and Simon Rix from Kaiser Chiefs	(no performance)
507	March 29, 2012	Machine Gun Kelly	Melanie Fiona
508	April 5, 2012	Bert McCracken and Quinn Allman from The Used	(no performance)
509	April 12, 2012	The Temper Trap	Of Monsters and Men
510	April 19, 2012	Gavin Rossdale	(no performance)
511	April 26, 2012	Neon Trees	Neon Trees
512	May 3, 2012	Tom Hiddleston	(no performance)
513	May 10, 2012	B.o.B	B.o.B
514	May 17, 2012	Santigold	Oberhofer

== See also ==
- List of Fuse shows
