= Fuse Media =

American national television network

Fuse Media, LLC
- Type: Private
- Industry: Media; Entertainment
- Headquarters: New York City, New York, United States
- Key people: Miguel Roggero (chairman and CEO)
- Brands: Fuse; FM; Fuse+; Billboard Español TV; Complex TV; El Rey Rebel; Fluffy TV; LOL! Network; OUTflix Movies; Shades of Black; Somos Novelas
- Website: www.fusemedia.com

Fuse Media, LLC is a Latino-owned entertainment company based in New York City.

The company's portfolio includes its namesake cable channel and its spin-off, FM (Fuse Music); a streaming division, including SVOD Fuse+ and various FAST Channels; Fuse Studios; Ignition Studios; as well as a branded content and live events business.

In April 2019, Fuse Media, filed for Chapter 11 bankruptcy protection, citing its lost coverage on Comcast and Verizon systems, as well as defaulting on a loan.

== Units ==
=== Television ===
Fuse produces original documentaries, films, and unscripted series for multicultural young adults (including Big Freedia Means Business, Sex Sells, and Like A Girl). Its spin-off channel, FM, primarily airs music-related programming and reruns of Fuse original series.

=== Streaming ===
Since March 2021, Fuse Media has maintained a streaming division, which includes Fuse's website, social media, digital video outlets; and branded free ad-supported streaming television (FAST) channels. In June, the company launched Fuse+, a subscription video on demand (SVOD) service focused on diverse storytelling.

In November 2022, Fuse Media partnered with the Canada-based, LGBT+-oriented, television and streaming network OUTtv to launch a branded FAST channel called OUTtv Proud. The channel would initially launch domestically on Pluto TV in June of 2023, before being distributed in the United States on Pluto, Freevee, Xumo, and Plex among others.

By 2024, Fuse Media would partner with El Rey Network to launch the El Rey Rebel FAST channel; which would air the network's original content, and carry combat sports programming as part Fuse's partnerships with Golden Boy Promotions and Combate Global. In June 2024, El Rey Rebel would begin distribution on DirecTV.

==== FAST channels ====
This is a list of Fuse-branded FAST channels available on the Fuse website and third-party streaming platforms.

===== Current =====
- Backstage – Features documentaries focusing on musicians and entertainers. Launched on March 25, 2021.
- El Rey Rebel – An El Rey Network-branded, "Latino-infused" channel that showcases a wide range of iconic feature films and TV series; including genre, cult classics, action, and horror.
- Latino Vibes – Features English-language Hispanic programming. Launched on December 1, 2022.
- OUTtv Proud – Original and acquired LGBTQ+ programming from the Canadian-based OUTtv.
- Shades of Black – Primarily features entertainment and lifestyle programming targeted towards an African American audience. Launched on May 11, 2021, as Fuse Beat, the channel was relaunched under its current name in September 2022.
- Somos Novelas – The only Spanish-language channel featuring novelas from around the world. (Not affiliated with Somos Group or its affiliates)

===== Former =====
- Camptastic – Focused on "campy" movies and exercise videos from the 1980s and 1990s. Launched on March 25, 2021, as Fuse Sweat, the channel rebranded as "Camptastic" in December 2022 and ceased operations on March 9, 2024.

=== Studios ===
Fuse Studios is Fuse's in-house production company that creates, develops, and produces the majority of Fuse's original series.

In 2023, Fuse Media launched Ignition Studios, a separate production division that assists in concept development, production, distribution, and consulting.
