= Ali Brustofski =

American singer-songwriter

- Born: Allison Brustofski; October 4, 1993 (age 32); United States
- Genres: Pop
- Occupation: Singer-songwriter
- Years active: 2003–present
- Labels: Independent, Atlantic Records & WEA International Inc. for "The Next"
- Website: www.alibrustofski.com

Allison "Ali" Brustofski (born October 4, 1993) is an American singer-songwriter from Oakland, New Jersey. She was a finalist on The CW television network's singing show, The Next: Fame Is at Your Doorstep in 2012, and the 2011 winner of New York's Z100 radio station's "Hometown Hero" competition, in which around 400 up-and-coming musicians participated. As a songwriter, Brustofski won the 2009 NYC Songwriters Circle's "Young Songwriter Award". On television, her original song "Rewind" was featured in two episodes of NBC's The Voice.

Brustofski is a successful YouTuber who performs cover versions of well-known artists like Katy Perry and David Guetta. As of October 2015, her YouTube channel had nearly 100 million total video views and more than a half a million subscribers. She released her first original EP Dream Big independently in 2013.

== Music career ==
=== YouTube ===
After spending several years performing in musical theater and recording voiceovers, Brustofski uploaded her 1st video to YouTube in December 2008. Up to June 2014, she has uploaded over 180 videos, including over 120 music videos.

=== Competitions and awards ===
==== NY Songwriters Circle ====
In November 2009, Brustofski won the NY Songwriters Circle "Young Songwriter Award" for her original song "Rewind" over 4,000 other entries.

==== MSG Varsity Talent Show ====
In April 2011, Brustofski was chosen to be a contestant on the MSG Varsity Talent Show from hundreds of submissions. The show was broadcast on Cablevision's MSG Varsity Network, and she reached the semi-finals.

==== Z100/State Farm Hometown Hero ====
In December 2011, Brustofski won the Z100/State Farm Hometown Hero Competition. She was voted into the top 25 artists, and selected to be a top 5 finalist by a music industry A-List panel of judges. Brustofski performed at the 2011 Z100 Jingle Ball Coca-Cola All-Access Lounge in the Hammerstein Ballroom on September 12, 2011 along with The Script, Gym Class Heroes, Hot Chelle Rae, and Karmin.

==== The Next: Fame Is At Your Doorstep ====
In August 2012, Brustofski was selected to appear on The Next: Fame Is at Your Doorstep, a nationally broadcast TV singing competition show which aired on The CW Network. She was mentored by Gloria Estefan, performed at The Paramount Theater, and won the New York episode of the show. Brustofski then worked with all four of the shows mentors: Gloria Estefan, Joe Jonas, Nelly and John Rich to prepare to perform in the semi-finals and finals episodes, broadcast from The Orpheum Theatre in Los Angeles.

== Recordings ==
=== Cover songs ===
Brustofski has recorded over 80 individual cover songs independently, which have been distributed by MudHutDigital.com, Keep Your Soul Records, and more. They include collaborations with Sabrina Carpenter, Katherine Hughes, Peter Hollens and Savannah Outen. Brustofski has also released two full albums of her cover songs: Cover to Cover, Vol. 1 and Cover to Cover, Vol. 2.

=== The Next: Performance ===
Brustofski recorded five studio versions of the cover songs she performed on the television show The Next: Fame Is at Your Doorstep, all of which were released by Atlantic Records in 2012.

=== Original songs ===
==== Singles ====
On January 1, 2009, Brustofski released her first original single, "Up, Up, Up!" which reached No. 2 on the Tween Pop Radio Top 40. Her second single, "Rewind" was released on April 4, 2011. Brustofski's recent single "Boys Like U" was made with the band "Like The Movies".

==== Dream Big EP ====
Brustofski's first EP, Dream Big, was realized through a successful Crowdfunding campaign on RocketHub. The EP was released on July 10, 2013. The first single was "Green Light" produced by David Veslocki and the music video for it premiered on Z100.com. "You Are", co-written with Jessica Vaughn produced by David Veslocki, the second single from the EP received its music video premiere on RyanSeacrest.com on January 17, 2014. "Goodbye To The Rain" is the final single from the Dream Big EP. It also premiered on Z100.com.

== Acting career ==
=== Theater ===
Brustofski began performing at the age of three, with the first of many competition dance programs. She then acted in several New Jersey musical theater productions, including "Annie" at the Darress Theatre in Boonton, NJ. At 10 years old, Brustofski performed as "Brigitta" in her first professional musical, The Sound of Music, at New Jersey's Paper Mill Playhouse.) Brustofski also performed Off-Broadway in the role of Nicki in "Dear Maudie" at the 78th St. Theatre.

=== Voiceover acting ===
In 2003, Brustofski was hired by Nickelodeon to be the voice for Piper O'Possum, the mascot of Nick Jr., from 2004 through 2007. She has continued to do voiceover work.

== Discography ==
=== Albums and EPs ===
EP and Album Information
Dream Big – EP
- Released: July 10, 2013
- Label: Independent
- Album Type: EP
- Song Type: Original Songs
- Track listing:
  - 1. Green Light
  - 2. Forever Young
  - 3. Goodbye to the Rain
  - 4. So Far
  - 5. Loveblind
  - 6. You Are
- Note: Online download and streaming only.
Cover to Cover, Vol. 1
- Released: November 19, 2013
- Label: Independent
- Album Type: Album
- Song Type: Cover Songs
- Track listing:
  - 1. Somewhere
  - 2. I Want To Hold Your Hand
  - 3. Got Dynamite
  - 4. Keep Holding On
  - 5. Need You Now (feat. Matthew Jordan)
  - 6. E.T.
  - 7. Who Says
  - 8. The Edge of Glory
  - 9. Skyscraper (Acoustic)
  - 10. Without You
  - 11. Wish You Were Here (feat. Chloe Temtchine)
  - 12. It Will Rain (Live Acoustic)
  - 13. Princess of China (feat. Connor Brustofski)
- Note: Online download and streaming only.
Cover to Cover, Vol. 2
- Released: November 20, 2013
- Label: Independent
- Album Type: Album
- Song Type: Cover Songs
- Track listing:
  - 1. Brokenhearted
  - 2. Part of Me
  - 3. Eyes Open
  - 4. Titanium
  - 5. Wide Awake
  - 6. As Long As You Love Me
  - 7. Good Time
  - 8. Dark Side (feat. Katherine Hughes)
  - 9. She Wolf
  - 10. Diamonds
  - 11. This Kiss
  - 12. Little Things (feat. Runaground) [Acoustic]
  - 13. Everything Has Changed (feat. Tom Andrews)
- Note: Online download and streaming only.
