= Jonnie Penn =

Canadian author and researcher

- Born: January 2, 1987 (age 39); Vancouver, British Columbia
- Education: University of Cambridge; Harvard University; McGill University
- Website: jonniepenn.com

Jonnie Penn (born January 2, 1987) is a bestselling Canadian non-fiction author and artificial intelligence researcher.

Jonnie is the creator of the MTV documentary series The Buried Life and co-author of the book What Do You Want To Do Before You Die?, which became a No. 1 New York Times Best Seller.

== The Buried Life ==
After the death of a friend, Jonnie dropped out of university to start The Buried Life with his friends Ben Nemtin, Dave Lingwood and brother Duncan Penn. The Buried Life asks, "What do you want to do before you die?"

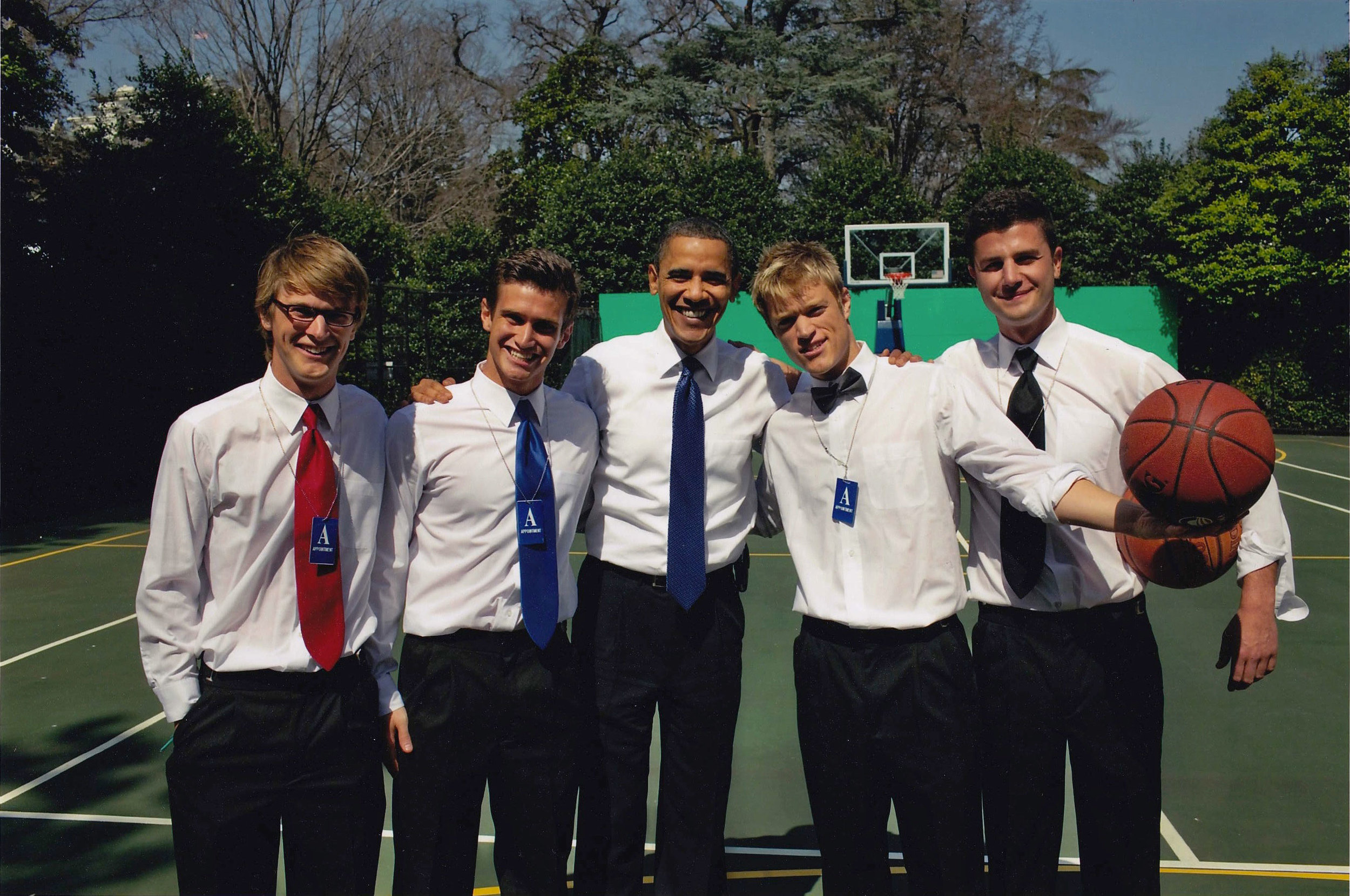
Barack Obama and the creators of The Buried Life.

Penn appeared on The Oprah Winfrey Show on April 9, 2010, to announce a new season of The Buried Life documentary series and to discuss crossing off #95: Play Ball with President Obama. He was recorded by the Guinness World Records for the largest roulette spin in Las Vegas history with all benefits going to World Food Programme. He also helped organize the biggest speed dating event in history with the University of South Florida. In July 2011, the cast helped make a $300,000 donation to The Keep America Beautiful foundation.

== Research career ==
In high school, Jonnie was selected to represent Canada at the Oxford University Debate Championships. He enrolled at McGill University in Montreal, with a double major in History and English. He then studied Philosophy of Physics and Logic at the University of Cambridge.

He is currently a Rausing, Williamson and Lipton trust and Leverhulme Centre for the Future of Intelligence PhD researcher in the History and Philosophy of Science Department at the University of Cambridge. His research explores the social implications of artificial intelligence over centuries. In 2018, he joined the Harvard Berkman Klein Center as an affiliate and the MIT Media Lab as an Assembly Fellow and served as a Google Technology Policy Fellow with the European Youth Forum. He has spoken at the United Nations about the future of work and at the 2019 World Economic Forum at Davos about data centralization.
