= Uranium (TV series) =

American television program about heavy metal

- Genre: Music
- Narrated by: Juliya Chernetsky (host)
- Country of origin: United States
- Original language: English

Production
- Executive producer: Emma Pollack
- Producers: Jason Haitkin; Denise Korycki
- Production locations: New York, other locations
- Running time: 30 minutes

Original release
- Network: MMUSA/Fuse TV
- Release: June 2002 – January 2005

Related
- Metal Asylum

Uranium is an American television program about heavy metal that aired on Fuse TV (MMUSA when the program debuted) in the early 2000s. After establishing herself as the host of MMUSA's Tastemakers program, Juliya Chernetsky, along with network producers, created Uranium as an outlet for the broad range of heavy metal subgenres. Debuting in 2002 and hosted by a 19-year-old Chernetsky, it served as Fuse TV's equivalent to MTV's Headbangers Ball, a long-canceled series that was revived shortly after Uranium's debut. With new episodes premiering Friday nights at 9pm ET, the program traditionally ran a half-hour featuring an interview with a band and music videos.

Uranium ended in 2006 due to Juliya's departure from Fuse TV, but reruns still occasionally air late at night. Current airings often consist entirely of video blocks without interview segments. Over the years, Fuse TV has introduced various new programs in place of Uranium, and Chernetsky has continued her career in heavy metal journalism.

== Format and style ==
Although basic camera equipment was used on Uranium, Juliya was always equipped with her digital camcorder throughout the show. This gave the effect of a video diary appropriately known as Juliya's Diary. As she interviewed bands, talked to fans, and attended live concerts, the view would switch back and forth from the conventional camera to the black & white view of Juliya's camcorder. Perhaps due to the annoyance it presented, band members would often tease Juliya about her camcorder and occasionally take it away from her during interview segments.

One of the first (if not the first) episodes of the program featured Juliya simply asking heavy metal fans what bands they think have been the most influential in the past ten years. The episode featured music videos by Metallica and Linkin Park as well as other mainstream groups of the general metal genre, in contrast to the show's more underground approach it would eventually lean toward. Throughout its time on the air, the show featured a black & orange color scheme and a stylized devil horn hand gesture as its official logo.

== Music videos ==
A wide variety of heavy metal music videos aired on Uranium, including those by bands of the underground scene. Some videos, such as Cradle of Filth's bondage themed "Babalon AD (So Glad For The Madness)" and the brutally violent "D.O.A." by The Haunted, were virtually exclusive to the show due to the stricter censorship regulations of MTV. Although more mainstream styles of music were not commonly featured on Uranium, occasionally, bands like Audioslave and Velvet Revolver managed to find exposure on the program.

== Notable interviews ==
Throughout its time on the air, Uranium had its share of memorable interviews. Just prior to their official reuniting, New York City band Life of Agony accepted an interview by Juliya with lead vocalist Mina Caputo being interviewed separately from the rest of the group. The band had a profound impact on Juliya, and toward the end of the interview, which was held in a restroom, Juliya became misty eyed and cracked up, receiving hugs from the band members.

Serj Tankian and Daron Malakian of the alternative metal band System of a Down were interviewed on their tour bus in 2002. The interview was notable for the sarcastic answers of the two members much to Juliya's dissatisfaction. Serj Tankian actually commented on her interview: Wow. Much time you got. In one of the final Uranium episodes in 2005, all members of System of a Down would be interviewed. They would prove even more indifferent to the second interview – so much that, during the end credits, production crew members began disputing with them over their lack of conformity.

During Marilyn Manson's promotion of the album The Golden Age of Grotesque, he agreed to an interview with Juliya. The record dealt heavily with a 1930s German burlesque theme, and not long into the interview, Manson took the camcorder from Juliya, pointing at her cleavage and then attempting to aim it up her skirt. Despite Juliya's sultry on-camera persona, this proved too much for her, and she immediately pushed the camcorder away with a bashful grin.

Possibly the most hyped interview for the program was that with Metallica which premiered October 24, 2003. This offered a rather rare TV interview with the group post St. Anger, and considering the traditionalist metal fan base of Uranium, Juliya made sure to ask the trying questions on many fans' minds in regards to Metallica's new musical approach. Unlike the typical format, this particular edition of Uranium gave total devotion to the interview and featured no music videos whatsoever. The original airing was followed by an edition of Uranium Classics consisting entirely of Metallica videos.

Chernetsky has cited Dimebag Darrell & Vinnie Paul of Damageplan and Dave Mustaine of Megadeth as some of her favorite interviews. System of a Down, Korn's David Silveria & Fieldy, and David Draiman of Disturbed have been regarded as some of her worst; although, she noted that misinterpretations caused problems in the latter interview and were later resolved between parties.

On August 16, 2005, Fuse TV announced its selection to become the exclusive cable television broadcast partner for the 10th anniversary of Ozzfest. As such, on August 19 at 9pm ET, Fuse premiered Ozzfest 2005: Uranium Invasion followed by Ozzfest 2005: Fuse's Metal Mayhem at 9:30pm ET, which provided coverage of second stage acts. This circumstance allowed for rare moments, including an emotional Chernetsky sitting in on a backstage impromptu jam session between Zakk Wylde and Jason Newsted.

== Spin-offs and aftermath ==
For the early part of the 2000s (decade), Uranium offered one of the only TV programs for heavy metal fans. Even after the revival of Headbangers Ball on May 10, 2003, Uranium continued to thrive as one of the most popular shows on Fuse TV. In 2003, it created a spin-off, Uranium Classics, a solid block of heavy metal and hard rock music videos from the 1970s, 1980s, and 1990s. This program commonly followed immediately after an episode of Uranium.

As Uranium became less of a priority on Fuse TV, Juliya began hosting a new show entitled Metal Asylum. This short-lived program largely consisted of music videos but rarely featured interviews. By 2006, the status of Uranium was in question, and Juliya finally publicized her departure from Fuse, making certain the show's fate. She would go on to host another interview program, Thrash Talk, for Dovetail TV.

In November 2007, Fuse TV aired an episode of Talking Metal On Fuse, allegedly the #1 metal podcast on iTunes. The program returned in February 2008 as a regular program on Fridays at midnight ET. Hosted by Mark Strigl and John Ostronomy, it features exclusive interviews and field packages in the podcast’s signature style.

While Uranium remains canceled, Chernetsky has returned to Fuse TV. She appeared on The Weekly Riff and, as of September 22, 2008, began hosting the Rock edition of No. 1 Countdown.

== Impact ==
Uranium certainly helped launch the career of Juliya Chernetsky, as it was her first major television role. The show's popularity, in a time where few TV programs featured in-depth heavy metal coverage, may also be considered highly influential if not directly responsible for MTV2's need to revive the long-ceased Headbangers Ball over eight years after its initial cancellation. At one point, rumors even surfaced that Juliya would "jump ship" to host Headbangers Ball. These allegations were finally acknowledged and denied by Juliya herself on an episode of IMX.

The program was also responsible for gaining several bands their first significant TV exposure through their interviews and music videos. This includes Hatebreed, Shadows Fall, and Lacuna Coil among others.

== See also ==
- Metal Asylum
- Headbangers Ball
