= Transcendent (TV series) =

- Genre: Reality television
- Starring: Bionka; Nya; L.A. Xristina; Bambiana
- Country of origin: United States
- Original language: English
- No. of seasons: 2
- No. of episodes: 13

Production
- Executive producers: Fenton Bailey; Randy Barbato; Tom Campbell; Nikki Calabrese; Larry Hashbarger; Chris Shifflett; Brad Tiemann; Cameron Kadison
- Camera setup: multi-camera
- Running time: approx. 23 minutes
- Production company: World of Wonder

Original release
- Network: Fuse
- Release: September 30, 2015 – present

Transcendent is an American reality television series that premiered on September 30, 2015 on Fuse. It focuses on the personal and professional relationships of a group of transgender women who perform at AsiaSF, a San Francisco nightclub.

== Broadcast ==
In 2015, Fuse announced a plan to expand from their core music programming. Transcendent was first announced as one of several new fall 2015 shows. The show is produced by World of Wonder, which produces a series about Big Freedia for Fuse. They gave a sneak peek at the Television Critics Association.

== Reception ==
The series originally aired on September 30, 2015. "Fuse, which targets Millennials ages 18-34 and recently re-launched, had the top original series premieres in its history for that group with Transcendent."

When the trailer came out, one reviewer said "It looks to be equal parts I Am Cait-style heartwarming drama about the lives and struggles of trans women, and trashy ensemble reality show in the style of The Real Housewives." Another said "The show is funny, personal and highlights the joys and struggles of being transgender."

== Characters ==
- Bionka
- Nya
- L.A.
- Xristina
- Bambiana

== Episodes ==
1. The girls are introduced. L.A. decides to take hormones, and Nya takes her to the doctor for a prescription. They rehearse for the show, and Xristina is late. We meet the guy Nya is dating, but they break up later.
2. Bionka and Xristina go to get hair removal. L.A. decides to audition to perform at the club. Nya gets promoted to manager of the other girls. Bambiana gets stood up on a date, so she invites her friends to join her.
3. They hold additions for male dancers, but Nya gets mad because Bioka says some inappropriate things. Bambiana decides to have surgery. Bionka has a huge birthday party. Later, Bionka and Bambiana meet in the park to fix their argument at the club.
4. Nya has a date. Xristina and her friend Rico are more than friends, and they seem to be romantically involved. Xristina wants to be a police office and talk to a police officer named Brody who is a transgender man. Nya tells L.A.her audition did not go well. Bambiana gets lip injections, and we meet her mother.
5. Bambiana also works at a salon, and she talks about her medical expenses. Her mother also has medical expenses, and Bambiana does not have enough money for everything. Nya has another date with her new boyfriend and they all meet at an art gallery. Bambiana gets fat freezing. Xristina is late again, and after Bionka calls her out, they meet at Xristina's apartment. Rico comes out in a towel, which surprises Bionka. Xristina says they are not dating. Bambiana goes to a therapist to talk about surgery.
