= IMX (TV series) =

American music TV program

- Genre: Music
- Presented by: Juliya Chernetsky; Marianela Pereyra; Steven Smith; Dennis L.A. White
- Country of origin: United States
- Original language: English

Production
- Production locations: Penn Plaza, New York City
- Running time: 60 min. (with commercials)

Original release
- Network: MMUSA/Fuse TV
- Release: January 20, 2003 – June 1, 2004

IMX (Interactive Music Exchange) is an American music television program that aired daily from 2002 to 2004 on MMUSA (renamed Fuse TV in May 2003). Described as a "fully converged music industry simulation game" and "part TV show, part Internet game," the program asked viewers to register at the network's website and buy ownership interests in popular artists, songs, and albums. In dealing the "shares", traders used the fake cash to enter network-sponsored contests. A rebranded successor, "Daily Download", was terminated in July 2006.

== Format ==
IMX was in development for nearly a year prior to its January 2003 debut. In a 2002 press release, network president Marc Juris discussed the inspiration behind the program:

"MuchMusic USA's mission is to provide its viewers with a real voice. What better way for a viewer's voice to be heard than by investing in an artist he or she loves? Our success and growth over the last year has occurred because we recognize that viewers want ownership and control of what they listen to and watch. We have developed technology that empowers our audience to create their own videos, select our video rotation, and even to host the shows we broadcast. Both the IMX program and game is the next step in this endeavor, by encompassing the technological advances of the web, the popularity of online games, and the potential of live television."

IMX featured three VJ hosts, each representing different music genres, as well as a guest from the music industry. It debuted on January 20, 2003, at 6pm EST and would air live Monday through Friday with various encores throughout the week. The IMX studio, located in Penn Plaza, was street level and therefore fans that couldn't get tickets were able to view from outside and would be visible through the window during filming.

In attempt to "extol the fun of the stock market," players would sign up online and be given a set amount of "IMX dollars" in order to buy stocks in artists, albums, videos, and TV offerings, which could be traded and sold short or for profit online. With such profits, players could win prizes like video game consoles, vacations, surfboards, or lithographs, all brought to them by Virgin Records. Stock values would be influenced largely by Billboard charts, concert sales, and other measures of commercial success.

Fixed to the bottom of the screen would be a market style ticker, updating viewers on how each artist, album, or song fared during the day's trading. Users could voice their opinions on the online bulletin boards, and their messages would frequently be shown live on air. Through the website, they would also be provided with music video previews, music downloads, and a wide range of market research tools for the individual portfolios of game participants, including airplay stats and sales charts. The one-hour program would help recap the day's trading, the value of each featured artist and song, and speculate on the future of the market.

IMX utilized the interactive investment technology of Hollywood Stock Exchange to allow web users to invest in real time. Marc Juris elaborated on the technological potential of the innovative format:

"IMX is like fantasy football, but with rock stars. The applications it can embrace are infinitely broad - from broadband and the digital set-top box to wireless devices and e-commerce. It's a new kind of entertainment experience that will captivate our tech-centric young viewers, and also cable operators who are eager to drive the demand for digital set-top boxes and high-speed services."

== Hosts and guests ==
The show was hosted by Juliya Chernetsky of Uranium; Marianela Pereyra, who previously hosted Latin television's MHz HOT; and Steven Smith, formerly a VH1 personality. Dennis Da Menace (a.k.a. Dennis L.A. White) also frequently took up hosting duties in one's absence, usually Juliya's. Each host reflected different musical tastes with Juliya representing heavy metal, Marianela representing R&B, Steven representing indie/alternative rock, and Dennis representing hip hop. This allowed for frequent debate and friendly argument amongst the differing hosts. It was also during IMX that Juliya was confronted by her fellow hosts about false rumors that she might jump ship to MTV2 to host its revived Headbangers Ball.

Joining the diverse trio each day would be a variety of music industry insiders, ranging from current popular musicians to record company executives to music journalists. The program would also feature live in-studio performances following an interview with the given band. One particularly memorable episode saw Amy Lee and Ben Moody of Evanescence perform an acoustic rendition of "Going Under". Partly through the song, a string broke on Moody's guitar and caused the song to end prematurely.

== Daily Download ==
Daily Download
- Presented by: Dylan Lane; Marianela Pereyra; Steven Smith
- Country of origin: United States
- Original language: English

Production
- Production locations: Penn Plaza, New York City
- Running time: 60 min. (with commercials)

Original release
- Network: Fuse TV
- Release: June 1, 2004 – July 1, 2006

In June 2004, IMX was rebranded Daily Download with an altered format. This series took place in the same studio and maintained the same schedule with Marianela, Steven, and Dylan Lane as hosts; however, the stock exchange aspect of IMX was removed in favor of a simpler interactive format. Daily Download served as a "live countdown show for the next generation," featuring the 10 most-downloaded songs in the country. It also offered free downloads of each song provided by f.y.e. as well as game cheats and movie trailers. The videos aired would include "Fuse Clues" that related to online puzzles of music and pop culture at the network's website, fuse.tv. Using a mobile phone or the Web, fans could solve the puzzles and be eligible to win prizes. Viewers also had the opportunity to talk to guest musicians appearing on the program.

Daily Download ran for about two years before ending in late July 2006. Marianela appeared on Get Malled Tour before ultimately leaving Fuse TV that year, and Dylan became the new host of GSN's Chain Reaction on August 1. Steven, however, would remain with Fuse TV and host other programs including Steven's Untitled Rock Show.
