= Married to the Army: Alaska =

- Genre: Documentary
- Country of origin: United States
- Original language: English
- No. of seasons: 1
- No. of episodes: 8

Production
- Executive producer: Stephanie Drachkovitch
- Running time: 42 minutes
- Production company: 44 Blue Productions

Original release
- Network: Oprah Winfrey Network
- Release: November 18 – December 29, 2012

Married to the Army: Alaska is an American reality television series that follows the lives of seven military wives living in Alaska. The series premiered on Oprah Winfrey Network on Sunday November 18, 2012 at 10/9c.

== Premise ==
OWN describes the concept behind the series: "Alaska is home to more than 10,000 active-duty soldiers, about 7,000 of whom were deployed to Afghanistan over the past two years. The war in Iraq may be over, but it continues in Afghanistan and for those families whose loved ones are still gone, life during deployment is challenging, especially in Alaska, an assignment the military considers as demanding as an overseas post. For the men and women whose spouses serve in the U.S. Army, deployment is not just an abstract word heard on the evening news.

It's real, it’s tough and it turns their world upside down. Military wives find themselves in a unique sisterhood. The tightest of bonds are formed over fears of deployment, realities of Army life and the emotional roller coaster of homecomings – all set against the backdrop of the rugged, demanding and extreme conditions of Alaska."

== Cast ==
- Yolanda Goins
- Blair Flanagan
- Lindsey Bergeron:
- Rynn Randall
- Salina Tillman
- Sara Dunlap
- Traci Moran

== Episodes ==
No.	Title	Original release date	U.S. viewers (millions)
1	"The Hooters Comment Was Offensive"	November 18, 2012	0.431
2	"You Ever Been in a Turkish Prison?"	November 19, 2012	0.162
3	"Knock at the Door"	November 25, 2012	0.232
4	"Attack on FOB Salerno"	December 7, 2012	N/A
5	"The Rules of Engagement"	December 7, 2012	N/A
6	"A Proper Army Wife"	December 29, 2012	N/A
7	"We Gotta Get Out of the Army"	December 29, 2012	N/A
8	"I'm an Army Wife"	December 29, 2012	N/A
