= Allison Hagendorf =

Television Host/Music Journalist

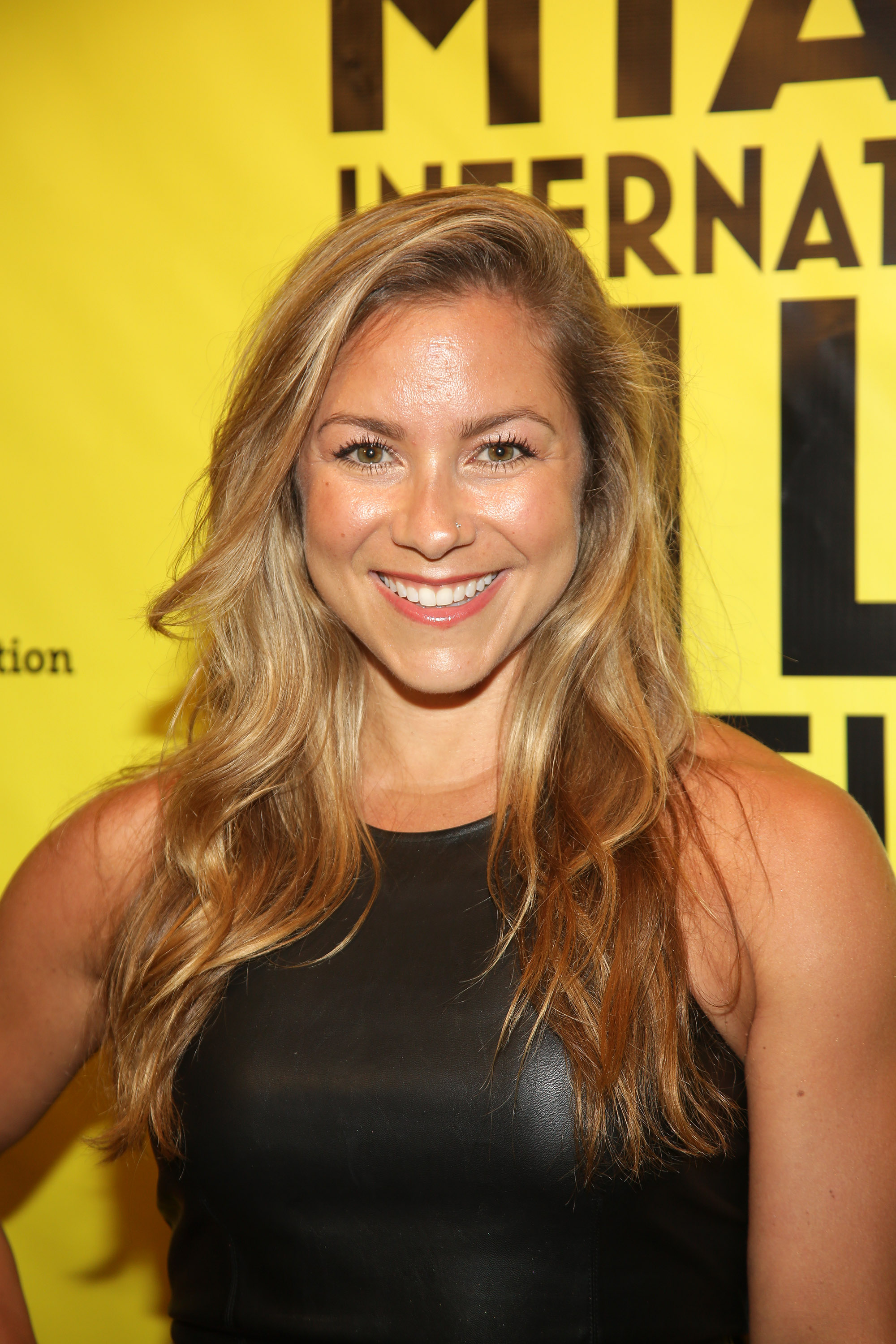
- Born: November 14, 1979; Rockland County, New York, U.S.
- Education: Clarkstown High School South
- Occupations: Television personality, music journalist
- Years active: 2006–present
- Known for: The Allison Hagendorf Show, Global Head of Rock at Spotify, The Next: Fame Is at Your Doorstep

Allison Hagendorf is an American music journalist and television personality. She hosted the New Year's Eve broadcast from Times Square from 2012 to 2019 and was the Global Head of Rock for Spotify.

Hagendorf is the host of The Allison Hagendorf Show and is a member of the Rock & Roll Hall of Fame Nominating Committee.

== Early life and education ==
Allison Hagendorf was born on November 14, 1979, in Rockland County, New York. She has completed her schooling from Clarkstown High School South, West Nyack, New York. After graduating from college, Allison Hagendorf gave some thought to pursuing a career in medicine; however, her passion for music ultimately prevailed.

== Career ==
Allison Hagendorf started her career as an A&R executive at SonyBMG for both Columbia and Epic Records, before transitioning to a TV host and music journalist, interviewing artists and covering music news for Fuse (TV channel). She hosted Fuse Top 20 Countdown. She has hosted The CW's music-competition show The Next: Fame Is at Your Doorstep, alongside celebrity judges Gloria Estefan, Joe Jonas, Nelly, and John Rich.

Starting in 2012, Allison became the Official Host of Times Square New Year's Eve for over one million revelers and over one billion global livestream viewers. She has also covered the Lollapalooza, South by Southwest, and Bonnaroo Music Festival.

Allison has served as the live announcer for the MTV Video Music Awards and MTV Movie Awards.

She hosted The X Games on ABC and ESPN, The CrossFit Games on ESPN, An Evening with Bon Jovi on AXS, and in 2023, the televised pre-show for the final KISS concert LIVE from Madison Square Garden.

In 2016, Allison hosted MTV's Video Music Awards. Hagendorf was named global head of rock for Spotify in January 2016. Prior to this, she was the Executive Producer and Host of the Spotify Original Series Rock This with Allison Hagendorf. On the show, she hosted artists like Queen, Miley Cyrus, Foo Fighters, blink-182, and Machine Gun Kelly.

Allison appeared in Asics x Runner's World Commercial in 2018.

In December 2023, she conducted the final KISS interview ever and hosted the pre/post show of the final KISS show Live from Madison Square Garden.

=== The Allison Hagendorf Show ===
In 2023, she launched 'The Allison Hagendorf Show' a weekly video-first show featuring interviews with musicians, actors, and personalities including Ringo Starr, DPR Ian, Keanu Reeves, Mötley Crüe, Lainey Wilson, Willow Smith, Sheryl Crow, Joan Jett, Nile Rodgers, G-Eazy, Jax, Paul Stanley, Tom Morello, Maynard James Keenan, Billy Corgan, Richie Sambora, Jimmy Jam, Corey Taylor, Duran Duran, Kelly Osbourne, Nandi Bushell, Paris Jackson, The Warning & Yungblud.

== Television & Shows ==
- Fuse Top 20 Countdown (2011)
- The Next: Fame Is at Your Doorstep (2012)
- Winter X Games XX (2016)
- The Allison Hagendorf Show (2023)
