= Fuse (TV channel) =

American national television network

- Country: United States; Canada (from 1994 to present)
- Broadcast area: Nationwide; Worldwide
- Headquarters: Glendale, California, U.S. (from 2014 to present); New York City, U.S. (from 1994 to 2014); Toronto, Ontario, Canada (from 1994 to 2003)

Programming
- Language: English
- Picture format: NTSC; HDTV 1080i (HD feed downgraded to letterboxed 480i for SD feed)

Ownership
- Owner: Fuse Media, LLC (Branding licensed from CHUM Limited as MuchMusic USA, and MMUSA from 1994 to 2003)
- Key people: Miguel Roggero (Chairman and CEO)
- Sister channels: FM; MuchMusic (1994–2003); Citytv (1994–2003)

History
- Launched: July 1, 1994; 32 years ago
- Replaced: NuvoTV (merged into Fuse on September 30, 2015)
- Former names: MuchMusic USA (1994–2001); MMUSA (2001–2003)

Links
- Website: www.fuse.tv

Availability

Streaming media
- DirecTV Stream: Internet Protocol television
- Fubo TV: Internet Protocol television
- Sling TV: Internet Protocol television

Fuse is an American television channel owned by Fuse Media, LLC.

The channel was originally launched in 1994 as MuchMusic USA, a localized version of the Canadian cable channel MuchMusic, and was dedicated to music-based programming; the channel relaunched under its current branding in 2003. Fuse was acquired by SiTV Media in 2014 and, after merging with the Latino-oriented NuvoTV in 2015, would shift its focus to general entertainment and lifestyle programming targeting multicultural young adults.

By February 2015, Fuse was available to approximately 71,491,000 pay television households (61.4% of households with television) in the United States. With a number of cable operators discontinuing their carriage in the years since, the channel currently has an availability of around 34 million pay television households as of 2022.

== History ==
=== As MuchMusic USA ===
The channel originally launched on July 1, 1994, as MuchMusic USA; it was founded as a joint venture between Rainbow Media (currently known as AMC Networks), a division of New York–based Cablevision and Toronto-based CHUM Limited. CHUM would later sell its 50% stake in the network to Cablevision in 2000, but allowed the continued use of the "MuchMusic" name under a brand licensing agreement.

The channel suffered from a lack of carriage; outside of Cablevision's own systems and others (such as the now-defunct PrimeStar), not many providers carried the network. Beginning in 1996, Rainbow began an effort to add American-produced original programming and music video blocks to the network. Certain Cablevision systems in major markets also experimented with locally oriented music countdown shows, typically produced in cooperation with a local radio station (such as Cablevision's Boston system producing the MuchMusic Boston Countdown together with radio station WFNX).

In 1998, the network also began to be included in a sub-unit of Rainbow focused upon live pay-per-view events taking place at New York's world-famous Radio City Music Hall and Madison Square Garden (both also owned by Cablevision's founding Dolan family), Radio City Networks.

Logo for MMUSA

By 2001, MuchMusic USA began to diverge from its Canadian parent; it introduced a new logo identifying itself as MMUSA, and began to air its own original programming and music video blocks, often featuring user-submitted videos; the network's new direction centered around viewer interactivity via the Internet, with the "mmusa.tv" website being the focal point of the interaction. Carriage of the network began to expand with the rise of digital cable, with Time Warner Cable and Comcast beginning to carry the channel around this time.

=== As Fuse ===
==== 2003–2013 ====
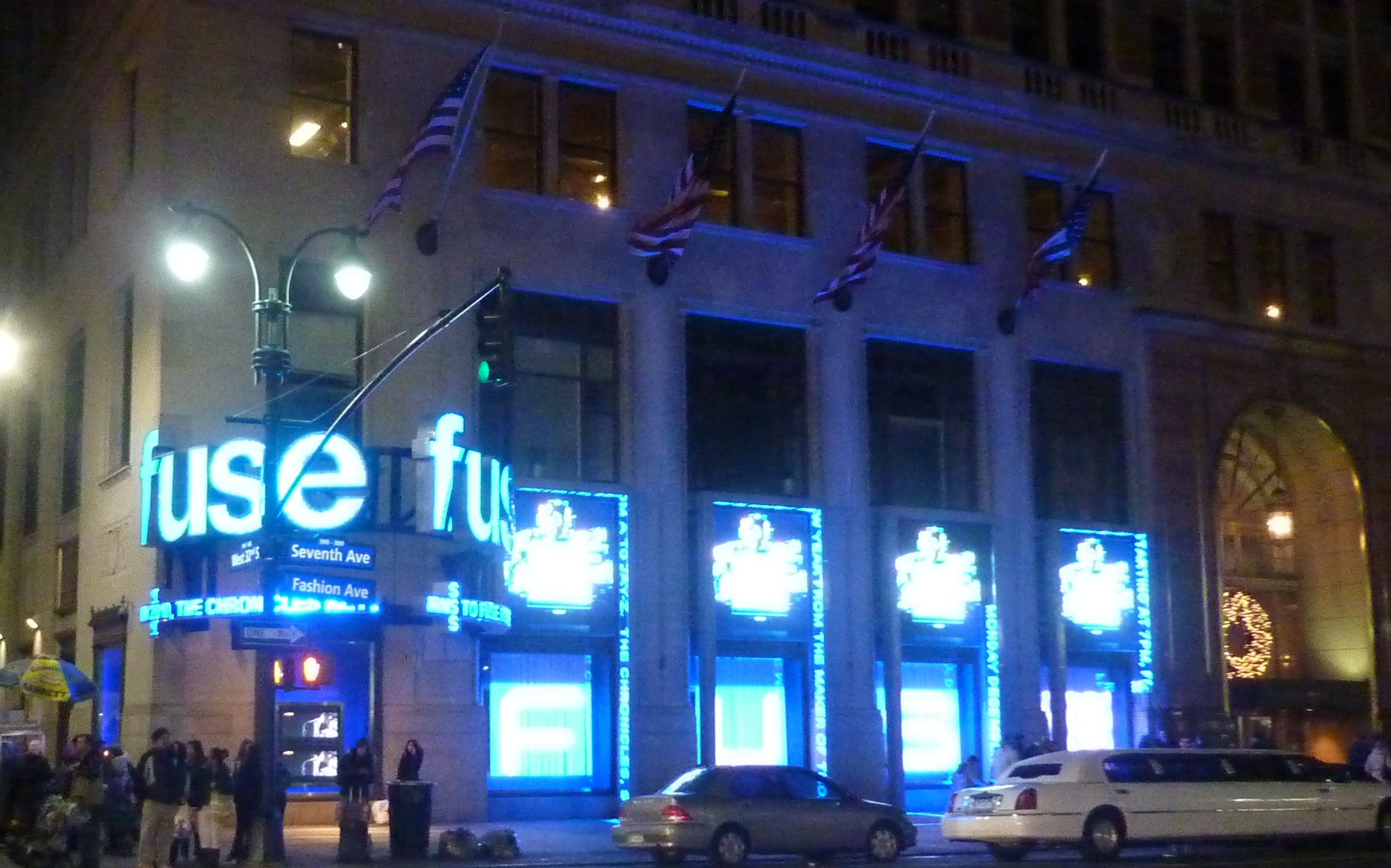
Fuse's former studios on Seventh Avenue across from Madison Square Garden.

After CHUM revoked its licensing agreement for the American channel to use the MuchMusic brand, Cablevision and Time Warner announced that it would relaunch MMUSA as Fuse in 2003; Fuse would officially relaunch on May 19, 2003, featuring more music centric shows like the IMX (TV series), the Uranium (TV series), and Kung Faux.

Fuse's advertising during this launch period, by New York–based Amalgamated, indirectly bashed the Paramount-owned MTV with a slogan touting Fuse as the channel "where the music went" generating controversy both through its criticism of MTV, and through its parodies, particularly that of the iPod ad campaign and Viacom, the corporate owner of MTV and, for a short while, the former owner of many of Fuse's current sister properties, protested when a Fuse billboard appeared across from its headquarters featuring Sally Struthers' plea to "save the music video".

In 2008, Fuse became the exclusive television partner for some major music events, including signing a three-year deal to air the Rock and Roll Hall of Fame Induction Ceremony and the Bonnaroo Music and Arts Festival.

In April 2010, Cablevision's MSG unit, including Fuse, was spun off as a separate publicly traded company, The Madison Square Garden Company.

On June 20, 2010, Fuse simulcast the 2010 MuchMusic Video Awards, marking its first broadcast of MuchMusic programming since its relaunch. Other MuchMusic programming would return in 2011, including The Wedge and Video on Trial (which would also gain an American version).

Blink-182 and former +44 singer/bassist Mark Hoppus began hosting his own weekly television series on Fuse that year, titled Hoppus on Music.

On June 28, 2011, Vevo and Fuse entered into a video syndication and content partnership. As part of the partnership, Fuse.tv syndicates Vevo's music video and entertainment programming, including exclusive music video premieres, live music events, and originally produced series.

In the fall of 2012, Fuse refocused itself with a new on-air branding campaign created by design agency LoyalKaspar, with its website now featuring trending music news stories. That winter, Fuse launched a mobile app for Android and iOS devices. In November 2012, Fuse announced the launch of Fuse News, a daily news update program which debuted in February 2013.

==== 2013–2019 ====
In March 2013, anonymous sources leaked news that MSG was planning to sell all or part of Fuse, as the network had been struggling, and was facing growing competition from digital outlets.

On April 4, 2014, MSG and SiTV Media, the parent company of the Latino-oriented entertainment network NuvoTV, announced that SiTV would acquire Fuse for $226 million. SiTV outbid rival network Revolt, which had made a $200 million offer to acquire Fuse. As part of the deal, the Madison Square Garden Company would take a 15% stake in SiTV. Prior to the official announcement, Benny Medina (manager of Jennifer Lopez, the network's chief creative officer) stated that if SiTV were to acquire Fuse, there were no immediate plans to make any major changes to the network's programming, emphasizing that Fuse and NuvoTV would be "two different companies with two different identities, audiences and goals". However, on May 1, Fuse News was cancelled with immediate effect, with the entire staff let go, along with other cuts throughout the network.

The acquisition was completed on July 1, 2014.

In March 2015, Fuse announced it would expand beyond music programming and merge with NuvoTV. A new programming slate was announced, including White Guy Talk Show, a late-night talk show hosted by Grace Parra and Saurin Choksi, which debuted on March 2, 2015; and, debuting on April 9, Skee TV, hosted by DJ Skee, featuring interviews and live performances. In addition, the newly rebranded parent company, Fuse Media, announced the launch of a new music channel focusing on "up-and-coming, young, diverse talent". The new channel, FM, would later launch on September 30, 2015, replacing NuvoTV.

In April 2015, Fuse became the exclusive broadcaster of Legends Football League games in the United States. On July 31, 2015, Fuse announced they would relaunch with a new logo and branding on September 30, 2015. In addition to new series such as Transcendent, which documents the lives of transgender women at AsiaSF Cabaret & Restaurant in San Francisco, and Revealed, which features music videos, interviews, and behind-the-scenes footage of artists at work, Fuse announced a multi-year partnership with comedian Gabriel Iglesias for additional new programming and comedy specials.

In November 2017, a partnership between Complex and Fuse was announced in which Fuse will air a block of Complex digital series under the Complex x Fuse banner. The block premiered on November 10, 2017.

Towards the end of 2018, both Comcast and Verizon announced that Fuse and FM would be dropped from Xfinity and Fios on January 1, 2019, reasoning that the networks' lack of viewership and Fuse's channel drift towards a sitcom and film repeat-heavy lineup did not justify continued carriage of the networks. Then-Fuse Media CEO Michael Schwimmer made the claim the networks were being dropped as Comcast's Department of Justice consent decree for their acquisition was relaxed regarding channel diversity and a commitment to independent channel operators, giving them an out from carrying the network. In reality, the decree remains in full effect and Fuse's de facto replacement, TV One sister network Cleo TV, launched broadly on Comcast systems on January 19 under the same decree.

In April 2019, Fuse's parent company, Fuse Media, filed for Chapter 11 bankruptcy protection, citing its lost coverage on Comcast and Verizon systems, as well as defaulting on a loan.

On September 3, 2019, a Fuse-branded channel was launched on Pluto TV.

==== Since 2020 ====
On November 19, 2020, current Fuse Media CEO Miguel Roggero and a "Latino-led management group" announced that they have acquired majority interest in the company.

In March 2021, Fuse Media announced the launch of a new streaming division, merging the network's website, social media, and digital video outlets with new branded free ad-supported television (FAST) channels. That summer, Fuse Media launched a subscription video on demand (SVOD) service, "Fuse+", in beta.

In December 2021, Comcast reached a renewed carriage agreement with Fuse Media, bringing Fuse and FM back to its cable service after 3 years, and also extending distribution of Fuse+ to its X1 and Flex set-top boxes.

In 2024, Fuse became the exclusive English language outlet for American-Hispanic MMA promotion Combate Global. In addition, Combate Global's library content would begin streaming on the company's El Rey Rebel FAST channel. Fuse's Pacific time zone feed is expected to close on August 25, 2025.

== Programming ==
Original programming that's currently produced by Fuse consists of lifestyle series, reality shows, and documentaries. After merging with NuvoTV and launching FM in September 2015, Fuse would slowly scale down its music-based programming.

Through its Fuse Presents series, the network has previously hosted live concerts from various venues, primarily from those owned by MSG.

== Former on-air staff ==
=== Music blocks ===
- Esteban Serrano – host of Top 20 Countdown
- Katie van Buren – host of Top 20 Countdown
- Timothy Dunn – host of Got Ur #
- Yasmine Richard – host of Top 20 Countdown and Trending 10

=== Entertainment and music shows ===
- Trending 10, hosted by Dan Brown and Zuri Hall
- Fuse Top 20 Countdown, hosted by Juliya Chernetsky and Allison Hagendorf
- Cee Lo Green * Talking to Strangers
- Hoppus on Music, hosted by Mark Hoppus
- Hip Hop Shop and On the Record, hosted by Touré

=== Fuse News ===
- Matte Babel – host of Fuse News
- Alexa Chung – host of Fuse News
- Georgie Okell – host of Fuse News
- Elaine Moran – host of Fuse News and Trending 10
- Jack Osbourne – host of Fuse News

== Related services ==
- Fuse+ – a subscription video on demand (SVOD) service. Launched in June 2021.

=== FM ===
FM
- Country: United States
- Headquarters: Glendale, California

Programming
- Language: English
- Picture format: 1080i (HDTV) (HD feed downgraded to letterboxed 480i for SDTVs)

Ownership
- Owner: Fuse Media, LLC
- Sister channels: Fuse

History
- Launched: September 30, 2015
- Replaced: NuvoTV

Links
- Website: www.fm.tv

Availability

Streaming media
- DirecTV Stream: Internet Protocol television

FM (an initialism for Fuse Music) is an American digital cable television network that launched on September 30, 2015. The network replaced NuvoTV, which was merged into Fuse on the same day. The channel currently airs a mix of music documentaries, unrelated general interest programming, and reruns of past Fuse and NuvoTV programming.

On July 9, 2018, Fuse Media announced a partnership with iHeartMedia to air a television version of syndicated radio program Big Boy’s Neighborhood on FM beginning July 30.
